= 2023 South American U-20 Championship squads =

The 2023 South American U-20 Championship will be an international football tournament to be held in Colombia from 19 January to 12 February 2023. The ten national teams involved in the tournament were required to register a squad of a minimum of 19 and a maximum of 23 players, including at least three goalkeepers (Regulations Article 49). Only players in these squads are eligible to take part in the tournament. The tournament exclusively requires players to be born between 1 January 2003 and 31 December 2007 to be eligible, that is, they must be a maximum of 20 years old and at least 16 years old (Regulations Article 46).

Each national team had to register its list of up to 23 players in the COMET system and then submit it to CONMEBOL by 5 January 2023, 18:00 PYST (UTC−3) (Regulations Articles 49 and 50). Teams are only permitted to make player replacements in cases of serious injuries up to 48 hours before the start of the tournament (Regulations Article 57). Teams are also permitted to replace an injured goalkeeper with another at any time during the tournament (Regulations Article 58). In addition, any player with positive PCR tests for SARS-CoV-2 may be replaced at any moment before and during the tournament (Regulations Article 60). All the substitutions must have the approval of the CONMEBOL Medical Commission.

The age listed for each player is as of 19 January 2023, the first day of the tournament. A flag is included for coaches who are of a different nationality than their own national team. Players name marked in bold have been capped at full international level.

== Group A ==
=== Colombia ===
Colombia announced their squad of 23 players on 4 January 2023.

Head coach: Héctor Cárdenas

No.	Pos.	Player	Date of birth (age)	Club
1	GK	Luis Marquinez	10 April 2003 (aged 19)	(Colombian Football Federation) Atlético Nacional
2	DF	Daniel Pedrozo	19 March 2004 (aged 18)	(Colombian Football Federation) Real Cartagena
3	DF	Édier Ocampo	3 October 2003 (aged 19)	(Colombian Football Federation) Atlético Nacional
4	DF	Fernando Álvarez	24 October 2003 (aged 19)	(Mexican Football Federation) Pachuca
5	DF	Kevin Mantilla	22 May 2003 (aged 19)	(Colombian Football Federation) Independiente Santa Fe
6	MF	Jhon Vélez	25 July 2003 (aged 19)	(Colombian Football Federation) Barranquilla
7	FW	Juanda Fuentes	19 May 2003 (aged 19)	(Royal Spanish Football Federation) Barcelona Atlètic
8	MF	**Gustavo Puerta** (captain)	23 July 2003 (aged 19)	(Colombian Football Federation) Bogotá
9	FW	**Jhon Durán**	13 December 2004 (aged 18)	(The Football Association) Aston Villa
10	MF	Alexis Manyoma	3 January 2003 (aged 20)	(Colombian Football Federation) Cortuluá
11	FW	Ricardo Caraballo	9 February 2004 (aged 18)	(Colombian Football Federation) Barranquilla
12	GK	Cristian Santander	20 August 2003 (aged 19)	(Colombian Football Federation) Barranquilla
13	MF	Juan Castilla	27 July 2004 (aged 18)	(United States Soccer Federation) Houston Dynamo FC
14	FW	Isaac Zuleta	10 August 2003 (aged 19)	(Royal Spanish Football Federation) Getafe B
15	DF	Juan José Mina	27 July 2004 (aged 18)	(Colombian Football Federation) Deportivo Cali
16	MF	**Óscar Cortés**	3 December 2003 (aged 19)	(Colombian Football Federation) Millonarios
17	DF	**Andrés Salazar**	15 January 2003 (aged 20)	(Colombian Football Federation) Atlético Nacional
18	MF	Johan Torres	7 September 2004 (aged 18)	(Colombian Football Federation) Independiente Santa Fe
19	MF	Miguel Monsalve	27 February 2004 (aged 18)	(Colombian Football Federation) Independiente Medellín
20	MF	Daniel Luna	7 May 2003 (aged 19)	(Colombian Football Federation) Deportivo Cali
21	DF	Julián Palacios	7 August 2003 (aged 19)	(Colombian Football Federation) Envigado
22	GK	Alexei Rojas	28 September 2005 (aged 17)	(The Football Association) Arsenal
23	FW	Jorge Cabezas Hurtado	6 September 2003 (aged 19)	(Colombian Football Federation) Independiente Medellín

=== Argentina ===
Argentina announced their squad of 23 players on 6 January 2023.

Head coach: Javier Mascherano

No.	Pos.	Player	Date of birth (age)	Club
1	GK	Federico Gomes Gerth	5 March 2004 (aged 18)	(Argentine Football Association) Tigre
2	DF	Lautaro Di Lollo	10 March 2004 (aged 18)	(Argentine Football Association) Boca Juniors
3	DF	Julián Aude	24 March 2003 (aged 19)	(Argentine Football Association) Lanús
4	DF	**Agustín Giay**	16 January 2004 (aged 19)	(Argentine Football Association) San Lorenzo
5	MF	Maxi González	4 May 2004 (aged 18)	(Argentine Football Association) Lanús
6	MF	**Máximo Perrone**	7 January 2003 (aged 20)	(Argentine Football Association) Vélez Sarsfield
7	FW	Julián Fernández	30 January 2004 (aged 18)	(Argentine Football Association) Vélez Sarsfield
8	MF	Gino Infantino	19 May 2003 (aged 19)	(Argentine Football Association) Rosario Central
9	FW	Alejo Véliz	19 September 2003 (aged 19)	(Argentine Football Association) Rosario Central
10	MF	**Facundo Buonanotte**	23 December 2004 (aged 18)	(The Football Association) Brighton & Hove Albion
11	FW	Brian Aguirre	6 January 2003 (aged 20)	(Argentine Football Association) Newell's Old Boys
12	GK	Franco Herrera	19 September 2003 (aged 19)	(Argentine Football Association) Newell's Old Boys
13	DF	Valentín Gómez	26 June 2003 (aged 19)	(Argentine Football Association) Vélez Sarsfield
14	DF	Nahuel Génez	18 June 2004 (aged 18)	(Argentine Football Association) Boca Juniors
15	MF	Axel Encinas	24 May 2004 (aged 18)	(Argentine Football Association) River Plate
16	DF	Brian Aguilar	13 April 2003 (aged 19)	(Argentine Football Association) Lanús
17	DF	Ulises Ciccioli	2 July 2003 (aged 19)	(Argentine Football Association) Rosario Central
18	DF	Francisco Marco	27 June 2003 (aged 19)	(Argentine Football Association) Defensa y Justicia
19	FW	Nicolás Vallejo	3 January 2004 (aged 19)	(Argentine Football Association) Independiente
20	MF	**Nico Paz**	8 September 2004 (aged 18)	(Royal Spanish Football Federation) Real Madrid Castilla
21	FW	Santiago Castro	18 September 2004 (aged 18)	(Argentine Football Association) Vélez Sarsfield
22	FW	Ignacio Maestro Puch	3 August 2003 (aged 19)	(Argentine Football Association) Atlético Tucumán
23	GK	Francisco Gómez	6 April 2004 (aged 18)	(Argentine Football Association) Racing

=== Brazil ===
Brazil announced a first squad of 22 players on 8 December 2022, however, this list had to be modified because several clubs did not release their players who were called up. On 5 January 2022, Brazil announced their new squad of 23 players, with the following players being removed from the first 22-man list: defender Lucas Beraldo from São Paulo, midfielders Matheus França and Victor Hugo (both from Flamengo) and forwards Endrick and Giovani (both from Palmeiras), Marcos Leonardo and Ângelo (both from Santos) and Matheus Martins from Fluminense. On 11 January 2023, defender Michel was ruled out due to an injury, and was replaced by Jean Pedroso.

Head coach: Ramon Menezes

No.	Pos.	Player	Date of birth (age)	Club
1	GK	Mycael	12 March 2004 (aged 18)	(Brazilian Football Confederation) Athletico Paranaense
2	DF	**Arthur**	17 March 2003 (aged 19)	(Brazilian Football Confederation) America Mineiro
3	DF	Douglas Mendes	13 June 2004 (aged 18)	(Brazilian Football Confederation) Red Bull Bragantino
4	DF	Robert Renan	11 October 2003 (aged 19)	(Brazilian Football Confederation) Corinthians
5	MF	**Andrey Santos** (captain)	3 May 2004 (aged 18)	(Brazilian Football Confederation) Vasco da Gama
6	DF	Patryck Lanza	18 January 2003 (aged 20)	(Brazilian Football Confederation) São Paulo
7	FW	Stênio	5 April 2003 (aged 19)	(Brazilian Football Confederation) Cruzeiro
8	MF	Marlon Gomes	14 December 2003 (aged 19)	(Brazilian Football Confederation) Vasco da Gama
9	FW	**Vitor Roque**	28 February 2005 (aged 17)	(Brazilian Football Confederation) Athletico Paranaense
10	FW	**Sávio**	10 April 2004 (aged 18)	(Royal Dutch Football Association) PSV Eindhoven
11	MF	Guilherme Biro	20 April 2004 (aged 18)	(Brazilian Football Confederation) Corinthians
12	GK	Kaique	16 April 2003 (aged 19)	(Brazilian Football Confederation) Palmeiras
13	DF	André Dhominique	7 October 2003 (aged 19)	(Brazilian Football Confederation) Bahia
14	DF	Weverton	17 February 2003 (aged 19)	(Brazilian Football Confederation) Cruzeiro
15	DF	Jean Pedroso	28 January 2004 (aged 18)	(Brazilian Football Confederation) Coritiba
16	DF	**Kaiki**	8 March 2003 (aged 19)	(Brazilian Football Confederation) Cruzeiro
17	MF	Ronald	11 February 2003 (aged 19)	(Brazilian Football Confederation) Grêmio
18	MF	Alexsander	8 October 2003 (aged 19)	(Brazilian Football Confederation) Fluminense
19	FW	Renan Viana	31 January 2003 (aged 19)	(Brazilian Football Confederation) Athletico Paranaense
20	FW	Pedro	5 February 2006 (aged 16)	(Brazilian Football Confederation) Corinthians
21	FW	Luis Guilherme	9 February 2006 (aged 16)	(Brazilian Football Confederation) Palmeiras
22	GK	Kauã Santos	11 April 2003 (aged 19)	(Brazilian Football Confederation) Flamengo
23	FW	Giovane	24 November 2003 (aged 19)	(Brazilian Football Confederation) Corinthians

=== Paraguay ===
Paraguay announced their squad of 23 players on 5 January 2023.

Head coach: Aldo Bobadilla

No.	Pos.	Player	Date of birth (age)	Club
1	GK	Ángel González	4 February 2003 (aged 19)	(Paraguayan Football Association) Libertad
2	DF	Alan Núñez	1 October 2004 (aged 18)	(Paraguayan Football Association) Cerro Porteño
3	DF	Gilberto Flores	1 April 2003 (aged 19)	(Paraguayan Football Association) Libertad
4	DF	Alexis Cantero	5 February 2003 (aged 19)	(Paraguayan Football Association) Guaraní
5	DF	Thiago Servín (2nd captain)	5 June 2003 (aged 19)	(Paraguayan Football Association) Guaraní
6	MF	Víctor Quintana	6 March 2003 (aged 19)	(Paraguayan Football Association) Olimpia
7	FW	**Diego González**	7 January 2003 (aged 20)	(Mexican Football Federation) Celaya
8	MF	**Diego Gómez** (captain)	27 March 2003 (aged 19)	(Paraguayan Football Association) Libertad
9	FW	Allan Wlk	1 March 2003 (aged 19)	(Paraguayan Football Association) Olimpia
10	MF	Matías Segovia	4 January 2003 (aged 20)	(Paraguayan Football Association) Guaraní
11	FW	Leonardo Rolón	16 May 2003 (aged 19)	(Paraguayan Football Association) Guaraní
12	GK	Rodrigo Frutos	6 January 2003 (aged 20)	(Paraguayan Football Association) Olimpia
13	DF	Abel Brítez	14 December 2003 (aged 19)	(Paraguayan Football Association) Cerro Porteño
14	MF	Nelson Gauto	14 July 2003 (aged 19)	(Paraguayan Football Association) Guaraní
15	DF	Axel Alfonzo	7 May 2004 (aged 18)	(Paraguayan Football Association) Olimpia
16	MF	Ariel Gamarra	25 February 2003 (aged 19)	(Argentine Football Association) Argentinos Juniors
17	FW	Kevin Pereira	15 January 2004 (aged 19)	(Argentine Football Association) Talleres
18	MF	César Olmedo	28 February 2003 (aged 19)	(Paraguayan Football Association) Olimpia
19	DF	Alexis Fretes	25 September 2005 (aged 17)	(Paraguayan Football Association) Libertad
20	MF	Tobías Sanabria	1 January 2004 (aged 19)	(Paraguayan Football Association) Olimpia
21	DF	Víctor Cabañas	13 February 2003 (aged 19)	(Paraguayan Football Association) Cerro Porteño
22	GK	Javier Talavera	12 August 2003 (aged 19)	(Paraguayan Football Association) Cerro Porteño
23	DF	Luis Rolón	27 February 2003 (aged 19)	(Paraguayan Football Association) Olimpia

=== Peru ===
Peru announced their squad of 23 players on 13 January 2023.

Head coach: Jaime Serna

No.	Pos.	Player	Date of birth (age)	Club
1	GK	Denzel Caña	22 February 2003 (aged 19)	(Peruvian Football Federation) Cienciano
2	DF	Anderson Villacorta	25 July 2005 (aged 17)	(Peruvian Football Federation) Universidad César Vallejo
3	DF	Arón Sánchez	4 May 2003 (aged 19)	(Peruvian Football Federation) Cantolao
4	DF	**Matías Lazo** (captain)	16 January 2004 (aged 19)	(Peruvian Football Federation) Melgar
5	MF	Gonzalo Aguirre	6 May 2003 (aged 19)	(Argentine Football Association) Nueva Chicago
6	MF	Catriel Cabellos	18 August 2004 (aged 18)	(Argentine Football Association) Racing
7	FW	**Juan Pablo Goicochea**	12 January 2005 (aged 18)	(Peruvian Football Federation) Alianza Lima
8	MF	Jack Carhuallanqui	9 May 2004 (aged 18)	(Peruvian Football Federation) Universitario
9	FW	Sébastien Pineau	20 January 2003 (aged 19)	(Peruvian Football Federation) Alianza Lima
10	MF	Valentino Sandoval	6 August 2003 (aged 19)	(Peruvian Football Federation) Universidad San Martín
11	MF	Álvaro Rojas	12 March 2005 (aged 17)	(Peruvian Football Federation) Universitario
12	GK	Sebastián Amasifuen	6 June 2004 (aged 18)	(Peruvian Football Federation) Alianza Lima
13	DF	Álex Custodio	31 January 2004 (aged 18)	(Venezuelan Football Federation) Zulia
14	FW	Diego Otoya	13 September 2004 (aged 18)	(Peruvian Football Federation) Sporting Cristal
15	DF	Nicolás Amasifuen	5 July 2005 (aged 17)	(Peruvian Football Federation) Alianza Lima
16	FW	**Kenji Cabrera**	27 January 2003 (aged 19)	(Peruvian Football Federation) Melgar
17	FW	Diether Vásquez	6 July 2003 (aged 19)	(Peruvian Football Federation) Universidad César Vallejo
18	DF	**Sebastián Aranda**	7 October 2003 (aged 19)	(Peruvian Football Federation) Alianza Lima
19	FW	Bruno Portugal	28 June 2003 (aged 19)	(Peruvian Football Federation) Melgar
20	MF	André Vásquez	30 January 2003 (aged 19)	(Peruvian Football Federation) Melgar
21	GK	Josué Vargas	28 March 2003 (aged 19)	(Peruvian Football Federation) Universidad César Vallejo
22	DF	Kluiverth Aguilar	5 May 2003 (aged 19)	(Royal Belgian Football Association) Lommel
23	DF	Gilmar Paredes	8 January 2003 (aged 20)	(Peruvian Football Federation) Sporting Cristal

== Group B ==
=== Ecuador ===
Ecuador announced their squad of 23 players on 5 January 2023.

Head coach: Jimmy Bran

No.	Pos.	Player	Date of birth (age)	Club
1	GK	Ethan Minda	4 July 2004 (aged 18)	(Ecuadorian Football Federation) LDU Quito
2	DF	Davis Bautista	16 February 2005 (aged 17)	(Ecuadorian Football Federation) Aucas
3	DF	Luis Córdova	17 January 2003 (aged 20)	(Ecuadorian Football Federation) Deportivo Cuenca
4	DF	Garis Mina (captain)	20 August 2003 (aged 19)	(Ecuadorian Football Federation) Independiente del Valle
5	MF	**Denil Castillo**	24 March 2004 (aged 18)	(Ecuadorian Football Federation) LDU Quito
6	DF	Yeltzin Erique	27 March 2003 (aged 19)	(Ecuadorian Football Federation) LDU Quito
7	MF	Emerson Pata	11 July 2004 (aged 18)	(Ecuadorian Football Federation) Independiente del Valle
8	MF	**Patrik Mercado**	31 July 2003 (aged 19)	(Ecuadorian Football Federation) Independiente del Valle
9	FW	Justin Cuero	18 March 2004 (aged 18)	(Ecuadorian Football Federation) Independiente del Valle
10	MF	Patrickson Delgado	17 October 2003 (aged 19)	(Royal Dutch Football Association) Jong Ajax
11	MF	**Alan Minda**	14 May 2003 (aged 19)	(Ecuadorian Football Federation) Independiente del Valle
12	GK	Gilmar Napa	5 January 2003 (aged 20)	(Ecuadorian Football Federation) Emelec
13	DF	Daniel de la Cruz	6 March 2004 (aged 18)	(Ecuadorian Football Federation) LDU Quito
14	DF	Orlando Herrera	23 January 2003 (aged 19)	(Ecuadorian Football Federation) Independiente del Valle
15	MF	Juan Sánchez	7 February 2003 (aged 19)	(Peruvian Football Federation) Sporting Cristal
16	FW	José Klinger	10 March 2005 (aged 17)	(Ecuadorian Football Federation) Independiente del Valle
17	MF	**Yaimar Medina**	5 November 2004 (aged 18)	(Ecuadorian Football Federation) Independiente del Valle
18	MF	Óscar Zambrano	20 April 2004 (aged 18)	(Ecuadorian Football Federation) LDU Quito
19	FW	Cristhoper Zambrano	5 July 2004 (aged 18)	(Ecuadorian Football Federation) Aucas
20	FW	Óscar Sosa	1 May 2003 (aged 19)	(Ecuadorian Football Federation) LDU Quito
21	MF	Sebastián González	6 June 2003 (aged 19)	(Ecuadorian Football Federation) LDU Quito
22	GK	Tony Jiménez	10 October 2003 (aged 19)	(Ecuadorian Football Federation) Guayaquil City
23	DF	Byron Carabalí	22 April 2003 (aged 19)	(Ecuadorian Football Federation) Aucas

=== Uruguay ===
Uruguay announced their squad of 23 players on 3 January 2023. On 15 January 2023, defender Ignacio Rodríguez was withdrawn from the squad due to an injury and was replaced by Valentín Gauthier.

Head coach: Marcelo Broli

No.	Pos.	Player	Date of birth (age)	Club
1	GK	Facundo Machado	19 January 2004 (aged 19)	(Uruguayan Football Association) Nacional
2	DF	Sebastián Boselli	4 December 2003 (aged 19)	(Uruguayan Football Association) Defensor Sporting
3	DF	Mateo Antoni	22 April 2003 (aged 19)	(Uruguayan Football Association) Nacional
4	DF	Mateo Ponte	24 May 2003 (aged 19)	(Uruguayan Football Association) Danubio
5	MF	Fabricio Díaz (captain)	3 February 2003 (aged 19)	(Uruguayan Football Association) Liverpool
6	DF	Mathías De Ritis	31 January 2003 (aged 19)	(Uruguayan Football Association) Peñarol
7	MF	Renzo Sánchez	17 February 2004 (aged 18)	(Uruguayan Football Association) Nacional
8	MF	Rodrigo Chagas	20 August 2003 (aged 19)	(Uruguayan Football Association) Nacional
9	FW	Álvaro Rodríguez	14 July 2004 (aged 18)	(Royal Spanish Football Federation) Real Madrid Castilla
10	MF	Franco González	22 June 2004 (aged 18)	(Uruguayan Football Association) Danubio
11	MF	Juan Cruz de los Santos	22 February 2003 (aged 19)	(Uruguayan Football Association) River Plate
12	GK	Randall Rodríguez	29 November 2003 (aged 19)	(Uruguayan Football Association) Peñarol
13	FW	Emiliano Rodríguez	16 July 2003 (aged 19)	(Uruguayan Football Association) Boston River
14	MF	Damián García	15 July 2003 (aged 19)	(Uruguayan Football Association) Peñarol
15	MF	Ignacio Sosa (2nd captain)	31 August 2003 (aged 19)	(Uruguayan Football Association) Fénix
16	DF	Facundo González	6 July 2003 (aged 19)	(Royal Spanish Football Federation) Valencia
17	MF	Matías Abaldo	2 April 2004 (aged 18)	(Uruguayan Football Association) Defensor Sporting
18	DF	Valentín Gauthier	8 August 2003 (aged 19)	(Uruguayan Football Association) Juventud de Las Piedras
19	FW	**Luciano Rodríguez**	16 July 2003 (aged 19)	(Uruguayan Football Association) Liverpool
20	FW	Nicolás Siri	17 April 2004 (aged 18)	(Uruguayan Football Association) Montevideo City Torque
21	FW	Anderson Duarte	23 March 2004 (aged 18)	(Uruguayan Football Association) Defensor Sporting
22	DF	Rodrigo Cabrera	7 August 2004 (aged 18)	(Uruguayan Football Association) Defensor Sporting
23	GK	José Arbío	21 January 2003 (aged 19)	(Uruguayan Football Association) River Plate

=== Venezuela ===
Venezuela announced their squad of 23 players on 17 January 2023.

Head coach: (Argentina) Fabricio Coloccini

No.	Pos.	Player	Date of birth (age)	Club
1	GK	Samuel Rodríguez	5 May 2003 (aged 19)	(Royal Spanish Football Federation) Atlético Madrid B
2	DF	Rafael Uzcátegui	4 October 2004 (aged 18)	(Venezuelan Football Federation) Mineros de Guayana
3	DF	Renne Rivas	21 March 2003 (aged 19)	(Venezuelan Football Federation) Caracas
4	DF	Santiago Gómez	18 May 2003 (aged 19)	(Venezuelan Football Federation) Academia Puerto Cabello
5	MF	**Telasco Segovia**	2 April 2003 (aged 19)	(Italian Football Federation) Sampdoria
6	DF	Carlos Rojas	23 January 2004 (aged 18)	(Venezuelan Football Federation) Deportivo La Guaira
7	FW	José Riasco	2 February 2004 (aged 18)	(United States Soccer Federation) Philadelphia Union II
8	MF	Emerson Ruíz	1 March 2003 (aged 19)	(Venezuelan Football Federation) Mineros de Guayana
9	FW	**Kevin Kelsy**	27 July 2004 (aged 18)	(Uruguayan Football Association) Boston River
10	MF	**Wikelman Carmona**	24 February 2003 (aged 19)	(United States Soccer Federation) New York Red Bulls
11	FW	**David Martínez**	7 February 2006 (aged 16)	(Venezuelan Football Federation) Monagas
12	GK	Frankarlos Benítez	3 May 2004 (aged 18)	(Venezuelan Football Federation) Caracas
13	DF	Alejandro Cova	19 May 2003 (aged 19)	(Royal Spanish Football Federation) Motril
14	MF	Maicol Ruiz	3 July 2003 (aged 19)	(Venezuelan Football Federation) Hermanos Colmenarez
15	MF	Cesar Da Silva	13 February 2004 (aged 18)	(Venezuelan Football Federation) Universidad Central
16	FW	Néstor Jiménez	8 April 2003 (aged 19)	(Venezuelan Football Federation) Caracas
17	MF	**Bryant Ortega**	28 February 2003 (aged 19)	(Venezuelan Football Federation) Caracas
18	FW	**Brayan Alcócer**	17 August 2003 (aged 19)	(Venezuelan Football Federation) Mineros de Guayana
19	DF	Andry Vera	5 November 2003 (aged 19)	(Venezuelan Football Federation) Mineros de Guayana
20	FW	Lewuis Peña	7 April 2004 (aged 18)	(Venezuelan Football Federation) Zulia
21	GK	Keiber Roa	22 April 2003 (aged 19)	(Venezuelan Football Federation) Universidad Central
22	MF	**Yerson Chacón**	4 June 2003 (aged 19)	(Venezuelan Football Federation) Deportivo Táchira
23	MF	Andrés Romero	7 March 2003 (aged 19)	(Venezuelan Football Federation) Monagas

=== Chile ===
Chile announced their squad of 23 players on 7 January 2023. On 15 January 2023, goalkeeper Eduardo Villanueva was withdrawn from the squad due to an injury and was replaced by Pedro Garrido.

Head coach: Patricio Ormazábal

No.	Pos.	Player	Date of birth (age)	Club
1	GK	Vicente Reyes	19 November 2003 (aged 19)	(United States Soccer Federation) Atlanta United 2
2	DF	Maicol León (captain)	9 June 2003 (aged 19)	(Football Federation of Chile) Palestino
3	DF	Yahir Salazar	19 January 2005 (aged 18)	(Football Federation of Chile) Universidad de Chile
4	DF	Tomás Avilés	3 February 2004 (aged 18)	(Argentine Football Association) Racing
5	DF	Sebastián Pino	28 January 2003 (aged 19)	(Royal Spanish Football Federation) Alavés
6	MF	Cristóbal Castillo	4 February 2003 (aged 19)	(Football Federation of Chile) O'Higgins
7	FW	Paolo Guajardo	27 May 2003 (aged 19)	(Football Federation of Chile) Santiago Wanderers
8	MF	Jeison Fuentealba	10 January 2003 (aged 20)	(Football Federation of Chile) Universidad de Chile
9	FW	Gabriel Norambuena	7 May 2003 (aged 19)	(Football Federation of Chile) Unión Española
10	MF	**Lucas Assadi**	8 January 2004 (aged 19)	(Football Federation of Chile) Universidad de Chile
11	MF	Joan Cruz	4 April 2003 (aged 19)	(Football Federation of Chile) Colo-Colo
12	GK	Thomas Gillier	28 May 2004 (aged 18)	(Football Federation of Chile) Universidad Católica
13	DF	Darko Fiamengo	13 February 2003 (aged 19)	(Football Federation of Chile) Colo-Colo
14	DF	**Marcelo Morales**	6 June 2003 (aged 19)	(Football Federation of Chile) Universidad de Chile
15	FW	Diego Ossa	14 April 2004 (aged 18)	(Football Federation of Chile) Universidad Católica
16	DF	Matías Vásquez	12 January 2003 (aged 20)	(Football Federation of Chile) Magallanes
17	FW	Manuel Lolas	11 January 2004 (aged 19)	(Football Federation of Chile) Rangers
18	MF	Bryan González	23 February 2003 (aged 19)	(Football Federation of Chile) Universidad Católica
19	FW	Vicente Conelli	7 January 2003 (aged 20)	(Football Federation of Chile) Unión Española
20	MF	Renato Cordero	16 April 2003 (aged 19)	(Football Federation of Chile) Universidad de Chile
21	FW	**Darío Osorio**	24 January 2004 (aged 18)	(Football Federation of Chile) Universidad de Chile
22	MF	Martín Maturana	18 January 2004 (aged 19)	(Football Federation of Chile) O'Higgins
23	GK	Pedro Garrido	29 October 2003 (aged 19)	(Football Federation of Chile) Universidad de Chile

=== Bolivia ===
Bolivia announced their squad of 23 players on 17 January 2023.

Head coach: Pablo Escobar

No.	Pos.	Player	Date of birth (age)	Club
1	GK	Bruno Poveda	22 October 2003 (aged 19)	(Bolivian Football Federation) Jorge Wilstermann
12	GK	Joel Bernal	1 February 2003 (aged 19)	(Bolivian Football Federation) Royal Pari
19	GK	Leonardo Guzmán	30 April 2004 (aged 18)	(Bolivian Football Federation) The Strongest
2	DF	**José Herrera**	9 March 2003 (aged 19)	(Bolivian Football Federation) Bolívar
22	DF	**Efrain Morales**	4 March 2004 (aged 18)	(United States Soccer Federation) Atlanta United 2
20	DF	Eduardo Álvarez	9 April 2003 (aged 19)	(Bolivian Football Federation) Royal Pari
3	DF	**Yomar Rocha**	21 June 2003 (aged 19)	(Bolivian Football Federation) Bolívar
4	DF	Jhon Jairo Velasco	8 March 2004 (aged 18)	(Bolivian Football Federation) Bolívar
6	DF	Carlitos Rodriguez	22 November 2004 (aged 18)	(Bolivian Football Federation) Jorge Wilstermann
15	DF	Denilson Durán	24 March 2003 (aged 19)	(Bolivian Football Federation) Blooming
13	DF	**Luis Paz**	9 June 2004 (aged 18)	(Bolivian Football Federation) Bolívar
11	MF	Pablo Luján	26 February 2003 (aged 19)	(Bolivian Football Federation) Blooming
8	MF	**Carlos Sejas**	10 January 2004 (aged 19)	(Bolivian Football Federation) Aurora
10	MF	Juan Pablo Magallanes	2 January 2003 (aged 20)	(Bolivian Football Federation) Bolívar
21	MF	**Lucas Chávez**	17 April 2003 (aged 19)	(Bolivian Football Federation) Bolívar
5	MF	Fabricio Quaglio	30 July 2003 (aged 19)	(Bolivian Football Federation) The Strongest
14	MF	**Fernando Nava**	8 June 2004 (aged 18)	(Brazilian Football Confederation) Athletico Paranaense
23	MF	**Ervin Vaca**	18 March 2004 (aged 18)	(Football Federation of Chile) Colo-Colo
7	FW	José Flores	3 August 2003 (aged 19)	(Bolivian Football Federation) The Strongest
18	FW	Ramiro Eguez	16 March 2004 (aged 18)	(Bolivian Football Federation) Blooming
16	FW	**Miguel Villarroel**	10 January 2003 (aged 20)	(Bolivian Football Federation) Bolívar
17	FW	Daniel Ribera	18 February 2005 (aged 17)	(Argentine Football Association) Talleres
9	FW	Diego Parrado	28 April 2003 (aged 19)	(Royal Spanish Football Federation) RSC Internacional
