= 2023 Copa Sudamericana first stage =

Stage of a football competition

The 2023 Copa Sudamericana first stage was played from 7 to 9 March 2023. A total of 32 teams competed in the first stage to decide 16 of the 32 places in the group stage of the 2023 Copa Sudamericana.

== Draw ==
The draw for the first stage was held on 21 December 2022, 12:00 PYST (UTC−3), at the CONMEBOL Convention Centre in Luque, Paraguay. For the first stage, the 32 teams involved were divided into eight pots according to their national association.

The 32 teams were drawn into 16 ties, with the four teams from each national association being drawn against a rival from the same association in two ties per association.

First stage draw
Bolivia	Chile	Colombia	Ecuador
(Bolivia) Oriente Petrolero; (Bolivia) Guabirá; (Bolivia) Atlético Palmaflor; (Bolivia) Blooming	(Chile) Palestino; (Chile) Cobresal; (Chile) Universidad Católica; (Chile) Audax Italiano	(Colombia) Deportes Tolima; (Colombia) Junior; (Colombia) Santa Fe; (Colombia) Águilas Doradas	(Ecuador) LDU Quito; (Ecuador) Emelec; (Ecuador) Deportivo Cuenca; (Ecuador) Delfín
Paraguay	Peru	Uruguay	Venezuela
(Paraguay) Guaraní; (Paraguay) Tacuary; (Paraguay) General Caballero (JLM); (Paraguay) Sportivo Ameliano	(Peru) Universitario; (Peru) Universidad César Vallejo; (Peru) Cienciano; (Peru) Binacional	(Uruguay) River Plate; (Uruguay) Peñarol; (Uruguay) Defensor Sporting; (Uruguay) Danubio	(Venezuela) Estudiantes de Mérida; (Venezuela) Deportivo Táchira; (Venezuela) Caracas; (Venezuela) Academia Puerto Cabello

== Format ==
In the first stage, each tie was played as a single-leg match. If tied after 90 minutes, extra time would not be played, and a penalty shoot-out would be used to determine the winner (Regulations Article 2.4.2).

The 16 winners of the first stage advanced to the group stage to join the 12 teams directly qualified for that stage (six from Argentina and six from Brazil), and four teams transferred from the Copa Libertadores (the four teams eliminated in the third stage of qualifying).

== Matches ==
Matches in this round were played on 7–9 March 2023.

Team 1	Score	Team 2
Guabirá (Bolivia)	0–1	(Bolivia) Oriente Petrolero
Blooming (Bolivia)	6–0	(Bolivia) Atlético Palmaflor
Cobresal (Chile)	0–1	(Chile) Palestino
Audax Italiano (Chile)	3–2	(Chile) Universidad Católica
Deportes Tolima (Colombia)	1–0	(Colombia) Junior
Águilas Doradas (Colombia)	1–2	(Colombia) Santa Fe
LDU Quito (Ecuador)	4–0	(Ecuador) Delfín
Emelec (Ecuador)	2–1	(Ecuador) Deportivo Cuenca
Guaraní (Paraguay)	3–1	(Paraguay) Sportivo Ameliano
Tacuary (Paraguay)	2–2 (4–2 p)	(Paraguay) General Caballero (JLM)
Universidad César Vallejo (Peru)	3–1	(Peru) Binacional
Universitario (Peru)	2–0	(Peru) Cienciano
Defensor Sporting (Uruguay)	0–0 (3–4 p)	(Uruguay) Danubio
River Plate (Uruguay)	0–4	(Uruguay) Peñarol
Caracas (Venezuela)	0–1	(Venezuela) Academia Puerto Cabello
Estudiantes de Mérida (Venezuela)	1–1 (3–1 p)	(Venezuela) Deportivo Táchira

8 March 2023
18:00 UTC−4

Guabirá (Bolivia)	0–1	(Bolivia) Oriente Petrolero
	Report	Correa 73'

Estadio Ramón Tahuichi Aguilera, Santa Cruz de la Sierra (Note: Guabirá played their home match at Estadio Ramón Tahuichi Aguilera, Santa Cruz de la Sierra instead of their regular stadium Estadio Gilberto Parada, Montero which did not meet CONMEBOL requirements.)
Attendance: 20,100
Referee: Guillermo Guerrero (Ecuador)

Oriente Petrolero advanced to the group stage (BOL 1).

9 March 2023
18:00 UTC−4

Blooming (Bolivia)	6–0	(Bolivia) Atlético Palmaflor
Sinisterra 16', 38', 51'; G. Rodríguez 45+1', 54'; Fenga 80'	Report

Estadio Ramón Tahuichi Aguilera, Santa Cruz de la Sierra
Referee: Augusto Aragón (Ecuador)

Blooming advanced to the group stage (BOL 2).

9 March 2023
19:00 UTC−3

Cobresal (Chile)	0–1	(Chile) Palestino
	Report	Dávila 28'

Estadio El Teniente, Rancagua (Note: Cobresal played their home match at Estadio El Teniente, Rancagua instead of their regular stadium Estadio El Cobre, El Salvador which did not meet CONMEBOL requirements.)
Referee: Andrés Rojas (Colombia)

Palestino advanced to the group stage (CHI 1).

7 March 2023
19:00 UTC−3

Audax Italiano (Chile)	3–2	(Chile) Universidad Católica
Sepúlveda 19'; Sosa 56'; Fuentes 58'	Report	Zampedri 16', 36'

Estadio El Teniente, Rancagua (Note: Audax Italiano played their home match at Estadio El Teniente, Rancagua instead of their regular stadium Estadio Bicentenario de La Florida, Santiago which did not meet CONMEBOL requirements.)
Attendance: 3,045
Referee: Jhon Ospina (Colombia)

Audax Italiano advanced to the group stage (CHI 2).

9 March 2023
19:00 UTC−5

Deportes Tolima (Colombia)	1–0	(Colombia) Junior
J. Hernández 7'	Report

Estadio Manuel Murillo Toro, Ibagué
Attendance: 9,777
Referee: Jesús Valenzuela (Venezuela)

Deportes Tolima advanced to the group stage (COL 1).

8 March 2023
19:00 UTC−5

Águilas Doradas (Colombia)	1–2	(Colombia) Santa Fe
Pineda 65'	Report	Mosquera 45+4'; De La Rosa 83'

Estadio Atanasio Girardot, Medellín (Note: Águilas Doradas played their home match at Estadio Atanasio Girardot, Medellín instead of their regular stadium Estadio Alberto Grisales, Rionegro which did not meet CONMEBOL requirements.)
Attendance: 1,784
Referee: Alexis Herrera (Venezuela)

Santa Fe advanced to the group stage (COL 2).

7 March 2023
21:00 UTC−5

LDU Quito (Ecuador)	4–0	(Ecuador) Delfín
Alzugaray 7'; Angulo 20'; Alvarado 78'; Caicedo 90+2' (o.g.)	Report

Estadio Rodrigo Paz Delgado, Quito
Referee: Darío Herrera (Argentina)

LDU Quito advanced to the group stage (ECU 1).

9 March 2023
19:00 UTC−5

Emelec (Ecuador)	2–1	(Ecuador) Deportivo Cuenca
Bolaños 13', 89'	Report	Mancinelli 49' (pen.)

Estadio George Capwell, Guayaquil
Referee: Yael Falcón Pérez (Argentina)

Emelec advanced to the group stage (ECU 2).

8 March 2023
19:00 UTC−3

Guaraní (Paraguay)	3–1	(Paraguay) Sportivo Ameliano
Santander 45+2'; Dorrego 53'; Borja 60'	Report	B. Cáceres 47'

Estadio Manuel Ferreira, Asunción (Note: Guaraní played their home match at Estadio Manuel Ferreira, Asunción (originally scheduled at Estadio Defensores del Chaco, Asunción) instead of their regular stadium Estadio Rogelio Livieres, Asunción, which did not meet CONMEBOL requirements.)
Attendance: 2,243
Referee: Cristian Garay (Chile)

Guaraní advanced to the group stage (PAR 1).

7 March 2023
19:00 UTC−3

Tacuary (Paraguay)	2–2	(Paraguay) General Caballero (JLM)
Ruiz 27'; Paredes 84'	Report	García 49' (o.g.); D. Martínez 68'
Penalties
Ferreira (penalty scored); Ruiz (penalty scored); Ayala (penalty scored); Paredes (penalty scored)	4–2	(penalty scored) Ovelar; (penalty scored) Hauche; (penalty missed) Benítez; (penalty missed) Castellano

Estadio Defensores del Chaco, Asunción (Note: Tacuary played their home match at Estadio Defensores del Chaco, Asunción instead of their regular stadium Estadio Toribio Vargas, Asunción which did not meet CONMEBOL requirements.)
Attendance: 224
Referee: José Cabero (Chile)

Tacuary advanced to the group stage (PAR 2).

8 March 2023
21:00 UTC−5

Universidad César Vallejo (Peru)	3–1	(Peru) Binacional
Olaya 40'; Vanegas 74'; S. Mena 82' (o.g.)	Report	Palacios 1'

Estadio Nacional, Lima (Note: Universidad César Vallejo played their home match at Estadio Nacional, Lima instead of their regular stadium Estadio Mansiche, Trujillo, which did not meet CONMEBOL requirements.)
Attendance: 1,409
Referee: José Burgos (Uruguay)

Universidad César Vallejo advanced to the group stage (PER 1).

9 March 2023
21:00 UTC−5

Universitario (Peru)	2–0	(Peru) Cienciano
Quispe 10'; Herrera 70'	Report

Estadio Monumental, Lima
Attendance: 38,572
Referee: Gustavo Tejera (Uruguay)

Universitario advanced to the group stage (PER 2).

8 March 2023
19:00 UTC−3

Defensor Sporting (Uruguay)	0–0	(Uruguay) Danubio
	Report
Penalties
Navarro (penalty scored); Rocha (penalty missed); De los Santos (penalty scored); Duarte (penalty missed); N. Rodríguez (penalty scored); Abaldo (penalty missed)	3–4	(penalty scored) Millán; (penalty missed) Haller; (penalty missed) R. Rodríguez; (penalty scored) Ferreira; (penalty scored) May; (penalty scored) Sarmiento

Estadio Gran Parque Central, Montevideo (Note: Defensor Sporting played their home match at Estadio Gran Parque Central, Montevideo (originally scheduled at Estadio Centenario, Montevideo) instead of their regular stadium Estadio Luis Franzini, Montevideo which did not meet CONMEBOL requirements.)
Attendance: 5,170
Referee: Bruno Arleu (Brazil)

Danubio advanced to the group stage (URU 1).

7 March 2023
21:00 UTC−3

River Plate (Uruguay)	0–4	(Uruguay) Peñarol
	Report	Arezo 8', 16' (pen.), 75'; Milans 21'

Estadio Domingo Burgueño, Maldonado (Note: River Plate played their home match at Estadio Domingo Burgueño, Maldonado (originally scheduled at Estadio Centenario, Montevideo) instead of their regular stadium Parque Federico Omar Saroldi, Montevideo, which did not meet CONMEBOL requirements.)
Referee: Anderson Daronco (Brazil)

Peñarol advanced to the group stage (URU 2).

7 March 2023
20:00 UTC−4

Caracas (Venezuela)	0–1	(Venezuela) Academia Puerto Cabello
	Report	Hernández 53'

Estadio Olímpico de la UCV, Caracas
Attendance: 3,514
Referee: Ivo Méndez (Bolivia)

Academia Puerto Cabello advanced to the group stage (VEN 1).

8 March 2023
20:00 UTC−4

Estudiantes de Mérida (Venezuela)	1–1	(Venezuela) Deportivo Táchira
Paredes 87'	Report	Chacón 25'
Penalties
Doldán (penalty scored); Flores (penalty missed); Zorrilla (penalty scored); Páez (penalty scored)	3–1	(penalty missed) Díaz; (penalty missed) Farías; (penalty scored) Ritacco; (penalty missed) Castillo

Estadio Metropolitano, Mérida
Attendance: 15,913
Referee: Sávio Sampaio (Brazil)

Estudiantes de Mérida advanced to the group stage (VEN 2).
