= Kaique Pereira =

Brazilian footballer

Personal information
- Full name: Kaique Pereira Azarias
- Date of birth: 16 April 2003 (age 23)
- Place of birth: São Paulo, Brazil
- Height: 1.90 m (6 ft 3 in)
- Position: Goalkeeper

Team information
- Current team: Sporting CP
- Number: 30

Youth career
- –2018: Portuguesa
- 2019–2023: Palmeiras

Senior career*
Years	Team	Apps	(Gls)
2023–2026	Palmeiras	0	(0)
2024–2025	→ Farense (loan)	6	(0)
2025–2026	→ Nacional (loan)	28	(0)
2026–	Sporting CP	0	(0)

International career
2023	Brazil U20	3	(0)
- * Club domestic league appearances and goals as of 25 May 2026

Kaique Pereira Azarias (born 16 April 2003), also known as Kaique Pereira or simply Kaique, is a Brazilian professional footballer who plays goalkeeper for Primeira Liga club Sporting CP.

== Club career ==
Kaique won several youth tournaments for SE Palmeiras and gained prominence when playing for Brazil U20 as part of their 2023 South American U-20 Championship campaign. He started the match against Colombia on 9 February, saving a Gustavo Puerta penalty. He earned two more caps for Brazil's youth side during the 2023 FIFA U-20 World Cup, after Mycael was injured.

In July 2023, Kaique was promoted to the main squad of Palmeiras after the transfer of Vinícius Silvestre to Portimonense. On 14 July 2025, Kaique joined Primeira Liga club Nacional on a season long loan.

On 29 August 2026, Kaique signed a five-year contract with Primeira Liga club Sporting CP.

On 14 October 2026 he made his club debut in a Champions League 2-0 victory, away at Lens.

== International career ==
Kaique also played for the Brazil national under-20 football team in the 2023 South American U-20 Championship and 2023 FIFA U-20 World Cup.

== Career statistics ==
As of match played 16 May 2026

Appearances and goals by club, season and competition
Club	Season	League			State league		National cup		Continental		Other		Total	
Club	Season	Division	Apps	Goals	Apps	Goals	Apps	Goals	Apps	Goals	Apps	Goals	Apps	Goals
Palmeiras	2021	Série A	0	0	—		0	0	0	0	—		0	0
Palmeiras	2022	Série A	0	0	0	0	0	0	0	0	0	0	0	0
Palmeiras	2023	Série A	0	0	0	0	0	0	0	0	0	0	0	0
Palmeiras	2024	Série A	0	0	0	0	0	0	0	0	—		0	0
Palmeiras	Total		0	0	0	0	0	0	0	0	0	0	0	0
Farense (loan)	2024–25	Primeira Liga	6	0	—		0	0	—		—		6	0
Nacional (loan)	2025–26	Primeira Liga	28	0	—		0	0	—		—		28	0
Career total			34	0	0	0	0	0	0	0	0	0	34	0

== Honours ==
Palmeiras U20

- Copa São Paulo de Futebol Júnior: 2022
- Campeonato Brasileiro Sub-20: 2022
- Copa do Brasil Sub-20: 2022
- Campeonato Paulista Sub-20: 2021, 2022, 2023

Brazil U20

- South American U-20 Championship: 2023
