= Valentín Gauthier =

Uruguayan footballer

Personal information
- Full name: Valentín Gauthier Pereira Brasil
- Date of birth: 8 August 2003 (age 23)
- Place of birth: Salto, Uruguay
- Height: 1.91 m (6 ft 3 in)
- Position: Centre-back

Team information
- Current team: León

Youth career
- Club Remeros
- Ferro Carril
- 2021–2022: Juventud

Senior career*
Years	Team	Apps	(Gls)
2022–2025	Juventud	87	(8)
2025–	León	15	(0)

International career
2022–2023	Uruguay U20	11	(0)
- * Club domestic league appearances and goals as of 18:06, 30 September 2025 (UTC)

Valentín Gauthier Pereira Brasil (born 8 August 2003) is a Uruguayan footballer who plays as a centre-back for Liga MX club León.

== Club career ==
He began playing youth football at Club Remeros, a team from his hometown of Salto. He then went on to Ferro Carril where he excelled in the youth teams. He was the captain of the Salto under-17 team, where he won the 2020 national cup.

In 2021, he was signed by Juventud de Las Piedras. He started the year with the under-19 team, playing 16 games and scoring 1 goal. His good level earned him promotion to the Third Division, a category where he played 11 games and scored 1 goal.

During the first half of 2022, he continued with the under-19 team, playing 14 matches and scoring 2 goals.

He made his professional debut on July 14, 2022, as the coach brought him on in the 82nd minute to face Alto Perú as they won 4–0 in the first round of the Copa Uruguay. In the Uruguayan Segunda División, he made his debut on 6 August, he started against Progreso as they won 1–0. On 25 August, he scored his first official goal, in a 1–1 draw against Cerro.

During 2023 he consolidated himself in the team, starting the year as team captain despite being 19 years old. They reached the final of the Torneo Competencia, but were defeated by Progreso 5–1. They finished the championship in fourth position, for which they qualified for the play-offs for promotion. They first eliminated Rentistas by an aggregate score of 2–1, but in the final lost against Rampla Juniors.

The 2024 season started well for the club, as they reached the final of the Torneo Competencia again, but lost to Torque 2–0. They finished the tournament in fifth place, for the second consecutive year qualifying for the promotion play-offs, in the first round they beat Colón, and in the final they faced Uruguay Montevideo, a club they beat after winning 2–0 and drawing 1–1. Juventud completed their return to the top flight of Uruguayan football after 5 seasons. Gauthier played 35 matches and scored 3 goals.

After playing a good Apertura 2025 Tournament, where they had the chance to be champions until the final fixture, he moved abroad to join Liga MX club León. He made his debut on 20 July 2025 in a 1–0 win against Guadalajara. He also featured once in the 2025 Leagues Cup, as his side drew 1–1 with CF Montréal, before losing 7–6 in the penalty shootout, in which he scored.

== International career ==
He is a capped international for the Uruguay national under-20 football team.

Due to an injury to Nacho Rodríguez, he was called up by Marcelo Broli on 14 January 2023 to play in the South American U-20 Championship. He played 5 matches as they won the silver medal after losing to Brazil in the final.

== Career statistics ==
As of 30 September 2025

Club	Season	League			Cup		Continental		Other		Total	
Club	Season	Division	Apps	Goals	Apps	Goals	Apps	Goals	Apps	Goals	Apps	Goals
Juventud	2022	Segunda División	6	2	3 (Note: Appearance(s) in Copa Uruguay)	0	—		—		9	2
Juventud	2023	Segunda División	31	0	0	0	—		—		31	0
Juventud	2024	Segunda División	35	3	0	0	—		—		35	3
Juventud	2025	Primera División	15	2	0	0	—		—		15	2
Juventud	Total		87	7	3	0	0	0	0	0	90	7
León	2025–26	Liga MX	4	0	—		—		1 (Note: Appearance(s) in Leagues Cup)	0	5	0
Career total			91	7	3	0	0	0	1	0	95	7
