= Luis Paz (disambiguation) =

Luis Paz (1854–1928) was a Bolivian jurist.

Luis Paz may also refer to:

- Luis Paz (Bolivian footballer) (born 2004), Bolivian footballer
- Luis Paz (Colombian footballer) (1939–2015), Colombian footballer
- Luis Paz (swimmer) (born 1945), Peruvian swimmer
