= José Herrera =

Jose Herrera may refer to:

== Law and politics ==
- José Joaquín de Herrera (1792–1854), Mexican President
- José Posada Herrera (1814–1885), Spanish jurist and politician
- José Herrera (Maltese politician) (born 1961), Maltese politician
- José Sabino Herrera Dagdug (born 1980), Mexican politician

== Sports ==
=== Association football (soccer) ===
- José Herrera (Uruguayan footballer) (born 1965)
- José Herrera (football manager) (born 1978), Spanish football manager
- José Ángel Herrera (born 1989), Spanish football manager
- José Herrera (Bolivian footballer) (born 2003)

=== Baseball ===
- José Herrera (outfielder, born 1942) (1942–2009), Venezuelan baseball player
- José Herrera (outfielder, born 1972) (born 1972), Dominican baseball player
- José Herrera (catcher) (born 1997), Venezuelan baseball player

=== Other sports ===
- José Carlos Herrera (born 1986), Mexican sprinter

== Others ==
- José Cruz Herrera (1890–1972), Spanish painter
- José Herrera Petere (1909–1977), Spanish writer
