= Ulises Ciccioli =

Argentine footballer

Personal information
- Full name: Ulises Albano Ciccioli
- Date of birth: 2 July 2003 (age 23)
- Place of birth: Rosario, Argentina
- Height: 1.73 m (5 ft 8 in)
- Position: Defender

Team information
- Current team: Rosario Central
- Number: 4

Youth career
- Sportivo Bombal
- Rosario Central

Senior career*
Years	Team	Apps	(Gls)
2021–	Rosario Central	5	(0)
2024	→ Independiente Juniors (loan)	26	(3)
2025	→ Aucas (loan)	36	(2)

International career
2023	Argentina U20	3	(0)
- * Club domestic league appearances and goals as of 17:04, 26 July 2026 (UTC)

Ulises Albano Ciccioli (born 2 July 2003) is an Argentinian footballer who plays as a full-back for Rosario Central.

== Early life ==
Although born in Rosario, Ciccioli grew up living in Bombal, Santa Fe Province. He was born to parents Enzo and Silvia and had older brothers named Mariano and Leonel. He played locally for Sportivo Bombal as a striker. He was training with the Rosario Central first team by the age of 17 and his position on the pitch adapted.

== Club career ==
Ciccioli made his league debut for Rosario Central on the 5 November 2021 against Defensa y Justicia. He signed his first contract with the club towards the end of that season keeping him with the club until December 2024.

== International career ==
He was named in the Argentina under-20 squad by Javier Mascherano for the 2023 South American U-20 Championship held in Colombia in January and February 2023. Previously, he had scored for the side in a 1–1 draw with the Brazilian under-20 team in September 2022.
