= Jorge Cabezas Hurtado =

Colombian footballer (born 2003)

Jorge Hurtado
Personal information
- Full name: Jorge Leguín Cabezas Hurtado
- Date of birth: 6 September 2003 (age 23)
- Place of birth: Tumaco, Colombia
- Height: 1.85 m (6 ft 1 in)
- Position: Forward

Team information
- Current team: Deportes Tolima (on loan from Watford)

Youth career
- –2021: Real Cartagena

Senior career*
Years	Team	Apps	(Gls)
2021–2022	Real Cartagena	25	(4)
2023–	Watford	1	(0)
2023	→ Independiente Medellín (loan)	6	(0)
2023	→ New York Red Bulls (loan)	5	(0)
2023	→ New York Red Bulls II (loan)	5	(1)
2024	→ Gillingham (loan)	3	(0)
2024–2025	→ PAOK B (loan)	10	(11)
2025	→ Millonarios (loan)	14	(0)
2026–	→ Deportes Tolima (loan)	0	(0)

International career^{‡}
2022–	Colombia U20	20	(3)
- * Club domestic league appearances and goals as of 1 December 2025 ‡ National team caps and goals as of 3 June 2023

Jorge Leguín Cabezas Hurtado (born 6 September 2003) is a Colombian professional footballer who plays as a forward for Categoría Primera A club Deportes Tolima on loan from EFL Championship club Watford.

== Club career ==
Cabezas Hurtado is a product of Real Cartagena's academy: he made his professional debut for the club on 14 April 2021, coming on as a substitute in the second half of the Copa Colombia match against Llaneros, which ended in a 0–0 draw. The striker scored his first senior goal on 27 February 2022, netting the winner in a 1–2 Categoría Primera B victory over Real Santander. Then, on 20 April of the same year, he scored his first brace in a 3–1 league win over Boyacá Chicó.

On 3 October 2022, it was officially announced that Cabezas Hurtado had agreed to join EFL Championship side Watford on a permanent deal, signing a contract that would begin in the summer of 2023 and last until 2029. However, on 19 December of the same year, the transfer's activation was anticipated to January 2023, as the forward was officially set to join Categoría Primera A side Independiente Medellín on a six-month loan, with an option to extend the deal until the end of the 2023 season.

On 8 March of the same year, Hurtado made his Copa Libertadores debut, coming on for Miguel Monsalve at the 64th minute of a 1–1 draw against Magallanes, in the first leg of the third qualifying stage. Four days later, he also made his league debut, starting in a 2–0 defeat to Boyacá Chicó. Finally, on 15 March, he featured in the second leg of the Copa Libertadores tie against Magallanes, which saw DIM gain a 2–0 win and advance to the group stage of the competition.

On 2 August 2023, Hurtado joined Major League Soccer club New York Red Bulls on loan through the end of the 2023 season. While in New York he also featured five times for the New York Red Bulls II of the MLS Next Pro, scoring the opening goal in a 5–4 victory over the Chicago Fire II on 28 August 2023.

On 6 January 2024, Cabezas Hurtado made his Watford debut as a substitute in a 2–1 FA Cup win over Chesterfield, providing the assist for Tom Dele-Bashiru's injury time winner.

On 1 February 2024, Hurtado joined EFL League Two side Gillingham on loan for the remainder of the 2023–24 season. He made his league debut for the Kent-based side two days later, coming on as a substitute in the 63rd minute of a 1–1 home draw with Walsall. In his third appearance for the club, he sustained a knee injury, which ultimately forced him to return to his parent club for treatment.

On 15 August 2024, Hurtado joined Greek side PAOK on a season-long loan, with an option to buy.

On 29 July 2025, Hurtado joined Colombian side Millonarios on a season-long loan, with an option to buy.

== International career ==
Hurtado has represented Colombia at youth international level, having played for the under-20 national team.

In May 2022, he was included in the Colombian squad that took part in the Maurice Revello Tournament in France, where he scored a goal in the last group stage match against Japan, as the Cafeteros eventually finished in fourth place.

In January 2023, he was included in the Colombian squad for the South American U-20 Championship, hosted in his own country. Having scored two goals in the final stage of the tournament, as well as one assist, Cabezas Hurtado helped Colombia finish in third place and qualify for the FIFA U-20 World Cup.

In May 2023, Hurtado was included by head coach Héctor Cárdenas in Colombia's final squad for the FIFA U-20 World Cup in Argentina, where the Cafeteros reached the quarter-finals before losing to Italy.

== Style of play ==
Hurtado's manager at Watford Valérien Ismaël has described him as a "a left-footed and strong No.9, fast and with great intensity to press" and "very clinical in front of goal". Stephen Clemence, who managed him during his Gillingham loan, noted his ability to "do things that other players can’t do at times, that South American movement, snake hips".

== Career statistics ==
=== Club ===
As of 12 November 2025

Appearances and goals by club, season and competition
Club	Season	League			National cup (Note: Includes Copa Colombia, U.S. Open Cup, Greek Football Cup, FA Cup)		Continental		Other		Total	
Club	Season	Division	Apps	Goals	Apps	Goals	Apps	Goals	Apps	Goals	Apps	Goals
Real Cartagena	2021	Categoría Primera B	8	0	1	0	0	0	0	0	9	0
Real Cartagena	2022	Categoría Primera B	17	4	0	0	0	0	0	0	17	4
Total			25	4	1	0	0	0	0	0	26	4
Watford	2022–23	EFL Championship	0	0	1	0	0	0	0	0	1	0
Independiente Medellín (loan)	2023	Categoría Primera A	6	0	0	0	4 (Note: Appearances in the Copa Libertadores)	0	0	0	10	0
New York Red Bulls (loan)	2023	MLS	5	0	0	0	0	0	0	0	5	0
New York Red Bulls II (loan)	2023	MLS Next Pro	5	1	0	0	0	0	0	0	5	1
Gillingham (loan)	2023–24	EFL League Two	3	0	0	0	0	0	0	0	3	0
PAOK B (loan)	2024–25	Super League Greece 2	10	11	0	0	—		—		10	11
Millonarios (loan)	2025	Categoría Primera A	14	0	2	0	—		—		16	0
Deportes Tolima (loan)	2026-27	Categoría Primera A	0	0	0	0	—		—		0	0
Career total			68	16	4	0	4	0	0	0	76	16
