= Diego Parrado =

Bolivian footballer (born 2003)

Personal information
- Full name: Diego Parrado Olmos
- Date of birth: 28 April 2003 (age 23)
- Place of birth: Madrid, Spain
- Height: 1.63 m (5 ft 4 in)
- Position: Midfielder

Team information
- Current team: Albacete B
- Number: 11

Youth career
- 2008–2014: Rayo Vallecano
- 2014–2017: Santa Ana
- 2017–2022: Real Madrid

Senior career*
Years	Team	Apps	(Gls)
2022–2023	RSC Internacional	7	(0)
2023–2024	Náxara	11	(1)
2025–	Albacete B	0	(0)

International career^{‡}
2022	Bolivia U20	2	(0)
- * Club domestic league appearances and goals as of 13 April 2024 ‡ National team caps and goals as of 15 December 2022

Diego Parrado Olmos (born 28 April 2003) is a professional footballer who plays as a midfielder for Spanish club Atlético Albacete, he has represented Bolivia at youth international level.

== Club career ==
Born in Madrid, Parrado began his career in the academy of Rayo Vallecano before joining amateur side Santa Ana. He joined Real Madrid in 2017, and progressed through the academy until 2022, when he was sent to Real Madrid's third team, RSC Internacional.

== International career ==
In March 2022, following good performances for the Real Madrid youth team, Parrado was reportedly close to a call up to the Spanish youth teams. Though born in Spain, his father is Bolivian, and in August 2022 he went through the process of nationalising to be able to represent the Bolivian national team. He made his debut for the Bolivian under-20 side in a 3–3 friendly draw with Venezuela.

He was called up to the under-20 side again for the 2023 South American U-20 Championship, but did not feature as Bolivia were knocked out in the first round.

== Career statistics ==
=== Club ===
As of 13 June 2023.

Appearances and goals by club, season and competition
Club	Season	League			Cup		Other		Total	
Club	Season	Division	Apps	Goals	Apps	Goals	Apps	Goals	Apps	Goals
RSC Internacional	2022–23	Tercera Federación	7	0	0	0	0	0	7	0
Career total			7	0	0	0	0	0	7	0
