= Renato Cordero =

Chilean footballer

Personal information
- Full name: Renato Antonio Cordero Romo
- Date of birth: 16 April 2003 (age 23)
- Place of birth: San Felipe, Chile
- Height: 1.73 m (5 ft 8 in)
- Position: Defensive midfielder

Team information
- Current team: Unión Española (on loan from Universidad de Chile)

Youth career
- 2013–2021: Universidad de Chile

Senior career*
Years	Team	Apps	(Gls)
2022–	Universidad de Chile	19	(0)
2024–2025	→ Universidad de Concepción (loan)	26	(1)
2026–	→ Unión Española (loan)	0	(0)

International career^{‡}
2023	Chile U20	3	(0)
2024–	Chile U23	3	(0)
- * Club domestic league appearances and goals as of 14 January 2026 ‡ National team caps and goals as of 12 December 2023

Renato Antonio Cordero Romo (born 16 April 2003) is a Chilean footballer who plays as a defensive midfielder for Unión Española on loan from Universidad de Chile.

== Club career ==
Born in San Felipe, Chile, Cordero came to the Universidad de Chile youth system at the age of ten and made his professional debut in a Chilean Primera División match against O'Higgins on 24 July 2022. Previously, he was on the bench in the Copa Libertadores match against Argentine side San Lorenzo on 18 March 2021. In December 2022, he signed his first professional contract. In the second half of 2024, he was loaned out to Universidad de Concepción, winning the 2025 Primera B de Chile. In March 2026, he was loaned out to Unión Española.

== International career ==
At under-20 level, Cordero was called up for the Costa Cálida Supercup in September 2022, but he was withdrawn from the squad due to a muscle injury. The next year, he represented Chile at the South American U20 Championship, making three appearances.

At under-23 level, he was included in the squad for the 2024 CONMEBOL Pre-Olympic Tournament.

== Honours ==
Universidad de Concepción

- Primera B de Chile: 2025
