= Maicol León =

Chilean footballer (born 2003)

Personal information
- Full name: Maicol Andrés León Muñoz
- Date of birth: 9 June 2003 (age 23)
- Place of birth: Santiago, Chile
- Height: 1.77 m (5 ft 10 in)
- Positions: Defender; defensive midfielder

Team information
- Current team: Huachipato

Youth career
- 2009–2021: Palestino

Senior career*
Years	Team	Apps	(Gls)
2021–2024	Palestino	14	(1)
2024–	Huachipato	1	(0)

International career^{‡}
2021–2023	Chile U20	16	(0)
- * Club domestic league appearances and goals as of 11 February 2024 ‡ National team caps and goals as of 24 March 2023

Maicol Andrés León Muñoz (born 9 June 2003) is a Chilean professional footballer who plays as a defender or midfielder for Chilean Primera División side Huachipato.

== Club career ==
León came to Palestino youth system at the age of six and made his professional debut in 2021 at both national and international level. In February 2022, he signed his first professional contract.

In 2024, he switched to Huachipato after ending his contract with Palestino.

== International career ==
He represented Chile U20 at the friendly tournament Copa Rául Coloma Rivas, playing all the matches, and at three friendly matches against Paraguay U20 and Peru U20 in 2022. In the 2022 South American Games, he made 3 appearances. In 2023, he made four appearances in the South American U20 Championship, as the team captain.

== Personal life ==
He is the cousin of Jairo León, an Argentine footballer.

== Honours ==
Huachipato

- Copa Chile: 2025
