= Bruno Poveda =

Bolivian footballer (born 2003)

Personal information
- Full name: Bruno Rodrigo Poveda Zeballos
- Date of birth: 22 October 2003 (age 23)
- Place of birth: Santa Cruz de la Sierra, Bolivia
- Height: 1.81 m (5 ft 11 in)
- Position: Goalkeeper

Team information
- Current team: GV San José
- Number: 1

Youth career
- 2015–2019: Blooming
- 2019–2022: Wilstermann

Senior career*
Years	Team	Apps	(Gls)
2021–2024	Wilstermann	31	(0)
2025–	GV San José	9	(0)

International career^{‡}
2023–	Bolivia U20	4	(0)
2024–	Bolivia U23	2	(0)
- * Club domestic league appearances and goals as of 6 July 2025 ‡ National team caps and goals as of 2 February 2024

Bruno Rodrigo Poveda Zeballos (born 22 October 2003) is a Bolivian professional footballer who plays as a goalkeeper for Bolivian club GV San José.

== Club career ==
Born in Santa Cruz de la Sierra, Poveda joined Jorge Wilstermann's youth sides in 2019, from Blooming. He made his professional debut at the age of 18 on 7 December 2021, coming on as a late substitute for Daniel Sandy in a 3–0 home win over Real Tomayapo.

A third-choice during the 2022 season behind Luis Cárdenas and José Escobar, Poveda featured in his first international match on 28 April 2022, starting in a 3–1 Copa Sudamericana home loss to São Paulo. He became the youngest Bolivian goalkeeper to feature in a continental match, surpassing Luis Galarza's record with The Strongest in 1971.

After spending the 2023 campaign as a backup to Paraguayan Arnaldo Giménez, Poveda became a starter in 2024.

He was announced as a new GV San José player in January 2025.

== International career ==
After representing Bolivia at under-20 level in the 2023 South American U-20 Championship, Poveda received his first call up to the full side on 7 June 2023, for two friendlies against Ecuador and Chile. On 16 January 2024, he was included in Antônio Carlos Zago's final 23-man list for the 2024 CONMEBOL Pre-Olympic Tournament.
