= Paolo Guajardo =

Chilean footballer

Personal information
- Full name: Paolo Isaías Guajardo Ibacache
- Date of birth: 27 May 2003 (age 23)
- Place of birth: Viña del Mar, Chile
- Height: 1.79 m (5 ft 10 in)
- Position: Winger

Team information
- Current team: Audax Italiano
- Number: 7

Youth career
- 2012–2020: Santiago Wanderers

Senior career*
Years	Team	Apps	(Gls)
2021–2023	Santiago Wanderers	54	(5)
2024–	Audax Italiano	46	(2)

International career
2018–2019	Chile U17		
2021–2023	Chile U20	12	(1)
- * Club domestic league appearances and goals as of 1 September 2025

Paolo Isaías Guajardo Ibacache (born 27 May 2003) is a Chilean footballer who plays as a winger for Chilean Primera División side Audax Italiano.

== Club career ==
Born in Viña del Mar, Chile, Guajardo was trained at Santiago Wanderers. He made his professional debut in the 1–2 loss against Unión La Calera on 11 April 2021 for the Chilean Primera División.

In January 2024, Guajardo signed with Audax Italiano in the Chilean Primera División.

== International career ==
Guajardo represented Chile at under-17 level in friendlies during 2017 and 2018. Later, he represented the under-20's in friendlies and the 2023 South American Championship.
