= Fernando Nava =

Bolivian footballer (born 2004)

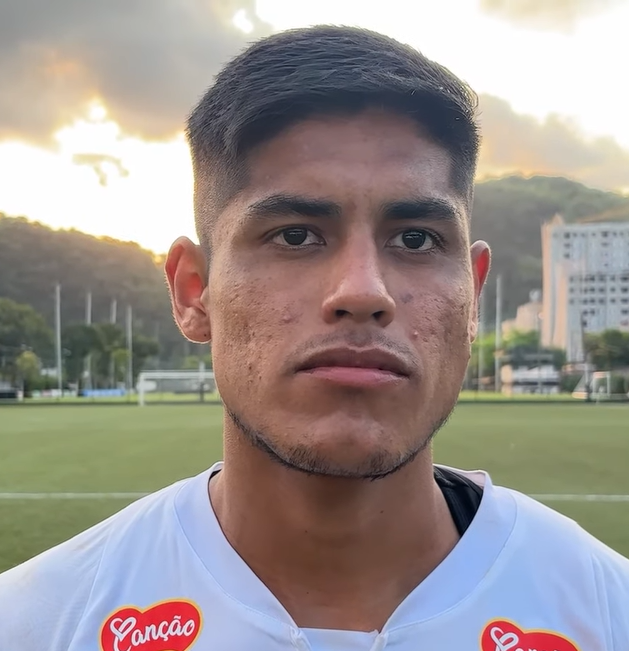
- Nava in 2024

Personal information
- Full name: Fernando Nava Ortega
- Date of birth: 8 June 2004 (age 22)
- Place of birth: Santa Cruz de la Sierra, Bolivia
- Height: 1.84 m (6 ft 0 in)
- Position: Winger

Team information
- Current team: Nacional
- Number: 17

Youth career
- –2021: Argentinos Juniors BOL
- 2021–2024: Athletico Paranaense
- 2024–2025: Santos

Senior career*
Years	Team	Apps	(Gls)
2025–2026	Oriente Petrolero	21	(7)
2026	Club Always Ready	9	(4)
2026–	Nacional	1	(0)

International career^{‡}
2022–2023	Bolivia U20	6	(1)
2023–2024	Bolivia U23	4	(0)
2023–	Bolivia	9	(1)
- * Club domestic league appearances and goals as of 12 September 2026 ‡ National team caps and goals as of 23:15, 27 September 2026 (UTC)

Fernando Nava Ortega (Note: In this name that follows Hispanic American naming customs, the first or paternal surname is Nava and the second or maternal family name is Ortega.) (born 8 June 2004) is a Bolivian footballer who plays as a winger for Primeira Liga club Nacional and the Bolivia national team.

== Club career ==
=== Athletico Paranaense ===
As a youth, Nava played for CD Argentinos Juniors Bolivia. In 2021 he was named the MVP of an under-17 tournament in Bahia, Brazil. Following the tournament, he made an agreement to join SE Palmeiras. Ultimately, he decided to join Campeonato Brasileiro Série A club Club Athletico Paranaense on a youth contract. Athletico spotted the player in the Ibotirama Cup in his homeland the year before.

In August 2022, Nava signed a professional contract with Furacão's under-20 side when he reached age eighteen. In summer 2023, he was registered to Athletico Paranaense's 50-man senior roster for the 2023 Copa Libertadores.

=== Santos ===
Nava left Athletico Paranaense and joined the under-20 team of Santos FC of the Série B in March 2024. His contract would convert into a three-year deal if the player scored the stipulated number of goals for the club. He became one of three Bolivians on the club's roster, along with Enzo Monteiro and Miguel Terceros.

=== Nacional ===
On 11 August 2026, Nava signed a four-season contract with Nacional in Portugal.

== International career ==
In January 2023, Nava was named to Bolivia's squad for the 2023 South American U-20 Championship. In the country's opening match of the tournament, Nava scored against Venezuela to earn a surprise 1–0 victory.

In March 2023, Nava was invited to a training camp with the senior national team by head coach Gustavo Costas to gain experience with the team. In the June the same year, he was one of six foreign-based players called up for friendlies against Ecuador and Chile in preparation for the beginning of 2026 FIFA World Cup qualification. Nava was expected to see playing time in the matches with starting attacker Marcelo Martins Moreno out with an illness.

Nava made his senior international debut on 27 August 2023 in a friendly against Panama. He came on as a second-half substitute for Diego Medina in the eventual 1–2 defeat.

== Career statistics ==
=== Club ===
As of match played 12 September 2026

Appearances and goals by club, season and competition
Club	Season	League			National cup		Continental		Other		Total	
Club	Season	Division	Apps	Goals	Apps	Goals	Apps	Goals	Apps	Goals	Apps	Goals
Oriente Petrolero	2025	FBF División Profesional	21	7	11	4	—		—		32	11
Always Ready	2026	FBF División Profesional	9	4	—		6 (Note: Appearances in Copa Libertadores)	1	—		15	5
Nacional	2026–27	Primeira Liga	1	0	0	0	—		—		1	0
Career total			31	11	11	4	6	1	0	0	48	16

=== International ===
As of 27 September 2026

Appearances and goals by national team and year
National team	Year	Apps	Goals
Bolivia	2023	1	0
Bolivia	2025	3	0
Bolivia	2026	5	1
Total		9	1

Scores and results list Bolivia's goal tally first.

No.	Date	Venue	Opponent	Score	Result	Competition
1.	15 March 2026	Estadio Ramón Tahuichi Aguilera, Santa Cruz, Bolivia	Trinidad and Tobago	3–0	3–0	Friendly
Last updated 16 March 2026
