= Nava (surname) =

Nava is a Spanish surname. Notable people with the surname include:

- Abraham Nava (born 1964), Mexican football (soccer) player
- Angélina Nava, better known as simply Angelina (born 2006), French singer
- Antonia Nava de Catalán (1779–1843), heroine of the Mexican War of Independence
- Cesare Nava (1861–1933), Italian engineer and politician
- Daniel Nava (born 1983), American baseball player
- Eduardo Nava (born 1997), American tennis player
- Emilio Nava (born 2001), American tennis player
- Gregory Nava (born 1949), American film director
- Ignacio "Nacho" Nava (1976–2019), American nightlife promoter, and activist
- Jackie Nava (born 1980), Mexican boxer
- José Francisco Nava (born 1983), Chilean pole vaulter
- Julian Nava (1927-2022), American diplomat and educator
- Lucille Nava, Filipino politician
- Mariella Nava (born 1960), Italian singer-songwriter
- Stefano Nava (born 1969), Italian footballer
- Thelma Nava (1932–2019), Mexican poet, magazine co-founder, publisher, journalist
