= Cristian Santander =

Colombian footballer (born 2003)

Personal information
- Full name: Christian Daniel Santander Rosero
- Date of birth: 20 August 2003 (age 23)
- Place of birth: Puerto Asís, Putumayo, Colombia
- Height: 1.86 m (6 ft 1 in)
- Position: Goalkeeper

Team information
- Current team: Barranquilla
- Number: 22

Youth career
- Tierra de Talentos
- Jamundí
- Deportes Tolima
- Barranquilla

Senior career*
Years	Team	Apps	(Gls)
2021–	Barranquilla	25	(0)

International career^{‡}
2022	Colombia U20	2	(0)
- * Club domestic league appearances and goals as of 16:53, 5 July 2023 (UTC) ‡ National team caps and goals as of 21:36, 5 July 2023 (UTC)

Christian Daniel Santander Rosero (born 20 August 2003) is a Colombian footballer who currently plays as a goalkeeper for Barranquilla.

== Club career ==
Born in Puerto Asís in the Putumayo Department of Colombia, Santander began his footballing career at the age of eight with local footballing school Tierra de Talentos. After leaving Tierra de Talentos at the age of twelve, he played for amateur side Jamundí Fútbol Club and the academy of Deportes Tolima, while he also represented the Putumayo Department.

He later went on to join Barranquilla, and having made his debut in late January 2022, he established himself as the club's first-choice goalkeeper for the season.

== International career ==
Following his professional debut with Barranquilla, Santander began to receive call-ups to the Colombia national under-20 football team. He was called up for the 2023 South American U-20 Championship squads as the most experienced goalkeeper in the squad, stating that "one always dreams of being the undisputed starter in the South American [U-20 Championship]".

== Career statistics ==
=== Club ===
As of 5 July 2023.

Appearances and goals by club, season and competition
Club	Season	League			Cup		Other		Total	
Club	Season	Division	Apps	Goals	Apps	Goals	Apps	Goals	Apps	Goals
Barranquilla	2021	Categoría Primera B	0	0	0	0	0	0	0	0
Barranquilla	2022	Categoría Primera B	21	0	0	0	0	0	21	0
Barranquilla	2023	Categoría Primera B	4	0	0	0	0	0	4	0
Career total			25	0	0	0	0	0	25	0
