= Luis Paz (Bolivian footballer) =

Bolivian footballer (born 2004)

Personal information
- Full name: Luis Fernando Paz Vargas
- Date of birth: 9 June 2004 (age 22)
- Place of birth: San Javier, Bolivia
- Height: 1.67 m (5 ft 6 in)
- Position: Right-back

Team information
- Current team: Bolívar
- Number: 8

Youth career
- Bolívar

Senior career*
Years	Team	Apps	(Gls)
2022–	Bolívar	73	(2)

International career^{‡}
2024–	Bolivia	4	(0)
- * Club domestic league appearances and goals as of 30 December 2025 ‡ National team caps and goals as of 14 November 2024

Luis Fernando Paz Vargas (born 9 June 2004) is a Bolivian professional footballer who plays for Bolívar and the Bolivia national team. Mainly a right-back, he can also play as a left-back.

== Club career ==
A youth product of Bolívar, Paz made his senior – and Primera División – debut on 7 August 2022, starting in a 2–1 away loss to Nacional Potosí, as the club only fielded reserve players. He was promoted to the main squad in the following year, and scored his first senior goal on 8 November 2023, netting his team's third in a 4–3 loss at Vaca Díez.

Paz became a regular starter for Bolívar in the 2024 season.

== International career ==
In January 2023, Paz was called up to the Bolivia national under-20 team for the 2023 South American U-20 Championship, On 23 August 2024, he was called up to the full side by manager Óscar Villegas for two 2026 FIFA World Cup qualification matches against Venezuela and Chile. He debuted on 5 September 2024 against Venezuela at the Estadio Municipal de El Alto. He substituted Roberto Fernández in the 75th minute of Bolivia's 4–0 victory.

== Career statistics ==
=== International ===
As of match played 14 November 2024

Appearances and goals by national team and year
National team	Year	Apps	Goals
Bolivia	2024	4	0
Total		4	0
