= Vicente Conelli =

Chilean footballer (born 2003)

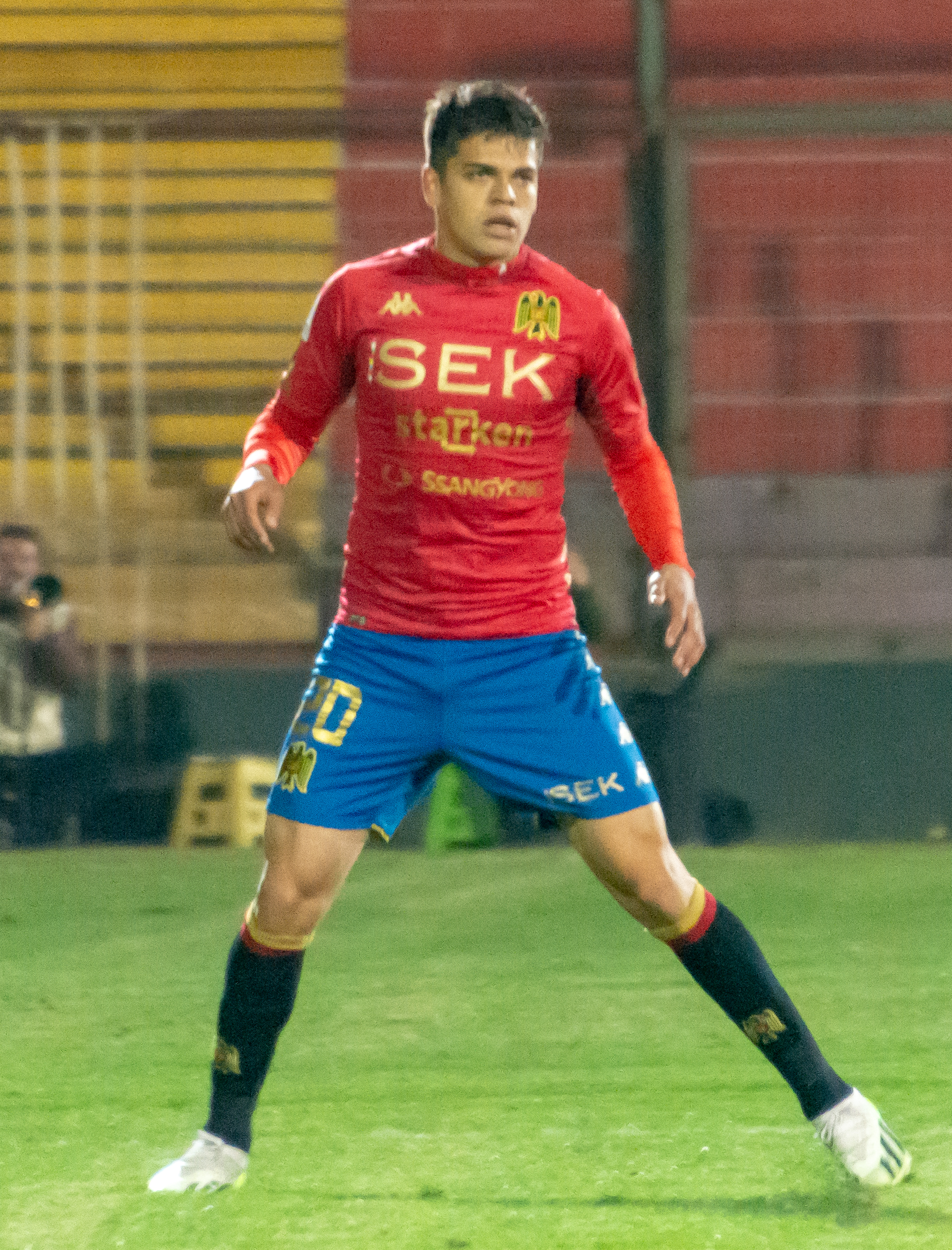
- Conelli with Unión Española in 2023

Personal information
- Full name: Vicente Javier Conelli González
- Date of birth: 7 January 2003 (age 23)
- Place of birth: Santiago, Chile
- Height: 1.80 m (5 ft 11 in)
- Position: Forward

Team information
- Current team: Cobreloa (on loan from Huachipato)

Youth career
- Colo-Colo
- Palestino
- Escuela Gasco
- 2011–2021: Unión Española

Senior career*
Years	Team	Apps	(Gls)
2021–2024	Unión Española	39	(5)
2024–	Huachipato	2	(0)
2025	→ Magallanes (loan)	11	(2)
2026–	→ Cobreloa (loan)	0	(0)

International career^{‡}
2021–2023	Chile U20	13	(2)
- * Club domestic league appearances and goals as of 10 January 2026 ‡ National team caps and goals as of 20 February 2023

Vicente Javier Conelli González (born 7 January 2003) is a Chilean professional footballer who plays as a forward for Cobreloa on loan from Huachipato.

== Club career ==
As a child, Conelli was with Colo-Colo, Palestino, Escuela Gasco and Escuela Valle Grande before joining the Unión Española youth system at the age of 8. He made his professional debut in a match against Universidad de Chile on 6 February 2021, and scored his first goal in a 2021 Copa Chile match against Deportes Puerto Montt on 23 June of the same year. In June 2024, he left Unión Española.

Following Unión Española, Conelli signed with Huachipato. He was loaned out to Magallanes for the second half of 2025. The next year, he moved to Cobreloa.

== International career ==
In December 2021, Conelli represented Chile U20 at the friendly tournament Copa Rául Coloma Rivas, playing three matches and scoring a goal against Uruguay U20. In 2022, he took part in the friendly matches against Paraguay U20 and Peru U20. In 2023, he made four appearances and scored one goal in the South American U-20 Championship.

== Personal life ==
As a child, Conelli worked as ball boy in the Estadio Santa Laura and performed Hispanito (Little Spanish), the mascot of Unión Española.

== Honours ==
Huachipato

- Copa Chile: 2025

Cobreloa

- Primera B de Chile: 2026
