= Brandon Palacios =

Mexican footballer (born 1998)

Personal information
- Full name: Brandon Roberto Palacios Bustamante
- Date of birth: 26 March 1998 (age 28)
- Place of birth: Guadalajara, Jalisco, México
- Height: 1.76 m (5 ft 9 in)
- Position: Right winger

Team information
- Current team: UTC
- Number: 19

Youth career
- Sporting Cristal

Senior career*
Years	Team	Apps	(Gls)
2018–2019	Sporting Cristal	5	(2)
2018	→ UTC (loan)	10	(1)
2019	→ San Martín (loan)	14	(1)
2020	Cusco	10	(1)
2021–2022	Carlos Stein	54	(11)
2023	Deportivo Binacional	33	(10)
2024	Sport Boys	22	(2)
2025–	UTC	22	(0)
- * Club domestic league appearances and goals as of 30 December 2025

Brandon Roberto Palacios Bustamante (born 26 March 1998) is a Mexican professional footballer who plays as a right winger for Peruvian Primera División side UTC.

== Career statistics ==
=== Club ===
As of match played 24 February 2024.

Club	Season	Division	League		Cup		Continental		Total	
Club	Season	Division	Apps	Goals	Apps	Goals	Apps	Goals	Apps	Goals
Sporting Cristal	2018	Torneo Descentralizado	0	0	—		0	0	0	0
Sporting Cristal	2019	Liga 1	5	2	2	0	—		7	2
Sporting Cristal	Total		5	2	2	0	0	0	7	2
UTC	2018	Torneo Descentralizado	10	1	—		—		10	1
San Martín	2019	Liga 1	14	1	0	0	—		14	1
Cusco	2020	Liga 1	10	1	—		2	0	12	1
Carlos Stein	2021	Liga 2	25	5	0	0	—		25	5
Carlos Stein	2022	Liga 1	29	6	—		—		29	6
Carlos Stein	Total		54	11	0	0	0	0	54	11
Deportivo Binacional	2023	Liga 1	33	11	—		—		33	11
Sport Boys	2024	Liga 1	5	1	—		—		5	1
Career total			131	28	2	0	2	0	135	28
