= Diether Vásquez =

Peruvian footballer (born 2003)

Personal information
- Full name: Diether Hans Vásquez Soto
- Date of birth: 6 July 2003 (age 23)
- Place of birth: Peru
- Height: 1.70 m (5 ft 7 in)
- Position: Winger

Team information
- Current team: UE Santa Coloma (on loan from Mineros de Zacatecas)

Youth career
- –2022: Club Deportivo Universidad César Vallejo

Senior career*
| Years | Team | Apps | (Gls) |
| 2023– | Mineros de Zacatecas | 29 | (2) |
| 2024– | → UE Santa Coloma (on loan) | | |
- * Club domestic league appearances and goals

Diether Hans Vásquez Soto (born 6 July 2003) is a Peruvian footballer who plays as a winger for UE Santa Coloma on loan from Mineros de Zacatecas.

== Club career ==
In 2023, he signed for Mexican side Mineros de Zacatecas. He was described as "one of the Peruvians with the greatest continuity abroad in the year [2023]" while playing for the club.

== International career ==
He is a Peru youth international. He played for the Peru national under-20 football team at the 2023 South American U-20 Championship.

== Style of play ==
He mainly operates as a winger. He has received comparisons to Peru international Andre Carrillo.
