= Fabricio Díaz =

Uruguayan footballer (born 2003)

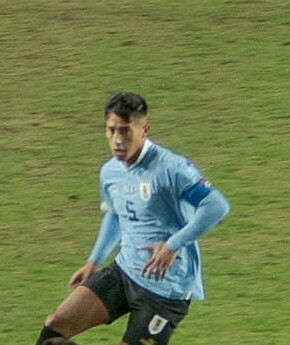
- Díaz with Uruguay U20 in 2023

Personal information
- Full name: Fabricio Díaz Badaracco
- Date of birth: 3 February 2003 (age 23)
- Place of birth: La Paz, Uruguay
- Height: 1.76 m (5 ft 9 in)
- Position: Midfielder

Team information
- Current team: Al-Gharafa
- Number: 29

Youth career
- La Paz Wanderers
- 2016–2020: Liverpool Montevideo

Senior career*
Years	Team	Apps	(Gls)
2020–2023	Liverpool Montevideo	107	(4)
2023–	Al-Gharafa	52	(0)

International career
2021–2023	Uruguay U20	32	(10)
Medal record
Men's football
Representing Uruguay
FIFA U-20 World Cup
Winner	2023 Argentina
South American U-20 Championship
Runner-up	2023 Colombia
- * Club domestic league appearances and goals as of 8 April 2026

Fabricio Díaz Badaracco (born 3 February 2003) is a Uruguayan professional footballer who plays as a midfielder for Qatar Stars League club Al-Gharafa.

== Early life ==
Díaz was born in La Paz, Canelones on 3 February 2003 to Gabriel Díaz and Verónica Badaracco. He is of maternal Italian descent.

== Club career ==
=== Liverpool Montevideo ===
Díaz is a youth academy graduate of Liverpool Montevideo. He made his professional debut for the club on 2 February 2020 in a 4 –2 win against Nacional in the 2020 Supercopa Uruguaya, playing the whole 120 minutes in the match and scoring the team's fourth goal. He also made his league and continental debut later in the same month: A 2–0 win against Llaneros de Guanare in the Copa Sudamericana on 12 February, and a week later, a 1–0 win against Plaza Colonia on 19 February, respectively.

=== Al-Gharafa ===
On 18 September 2023, despite having received offers from Barcelona in Spain and Brighton in England, Díaz joined Qatar Stars League club Al-Gharafa on a five-year deal.

== International career ==
=== Youth ===
Díaz is a former Uruguayan youth international. He served as captain of the Uruguayan side that won the 2023 FIFA U-20 World Cup in Argentina.

=== Senior ===
On 22 March 2022, Díaz received his first call-up to the Uruguay national team. He was added to the squad as a replacement for Matías Vecino who tested positive for COVID-19. On 21 October 2022, he was named in Uruguay's 55-man preliminary squad for the 2022 FIFA World Cup. However, he was not included in the final squad, which was announced three weeks later.

== Career statistics ==
As of match played 8 April 2026

Appearances and goals by club, season and competition
Club	Season	League			National cup (Note: Includes Copa Uruguay, Emir of Qatar Cup)		League cup (Note: Includes Qatari Stars Cup)		Continental		Other		Total	
Club	Season	Division	Apps	Goals	Apps	Goals	Apps	Goals	Apps	Goals	Apps	Goals	Apps	Goals
Liverpool Montevideo	2020	UPD	35	0	—		—		4 (Note: Appearance(s) in Copa Sudamericana)	0	2 (Note: One appearance, one goal in Supercopa Uruguaya; one appearance in championship playoff)	1	41	1
Liverpool Montevideo	2021	UPD	28	1	—		—		2 (Note: Appearances in Copa Libertadores)	0	—		30	1
Liverpool Montevideo	2022	UPD	31	3	1	0	—		1	0	2 (Note: One appearance each in Torneo Intermedio final and championship playoff)	0	35	3
Liverpool Montevideo	2023	UPD	13	0	0	0	—		2	0	1 (Note: Appearance in Torneo Intermedio final)	0	16	0
Liverpool Montevideo	Total		107	4	1	0	0	0	9	0	5	1	122	5
Al-Gharafa	2023–24	QSL	15	0	3	1	3	0	—		1 (Note: Appearance in Qatar Cup)	0	22	1
Al-Gharafa	2024–25	QSL	20	0	4	0	3	1	9 (Note: Appearance in AFC Champions League Elite)	0	1	0	37	1
Al-Gharafa	2025–26	QSL	17	0	0	2	0	0	8	0	0	0	27	0
Al-Gharafa	Total		52	0	7	1	8	1	17	0	2	0	86	2
Career total			159	4	8	1	8	1	26	0	7	1	208	7

== Honours ==
Liverpool Montevideo

- Uruguayan Primera División: 2023
- Supercopa Uruguaya: 2020

Uruguay U20

- FIFA U-20 World Cup: 2023
- South American U-20 Championship runner-up: 2023

Individual

- Uruguayan Primera División Team of the Year: 2022
