= Brayan Alcócer =

Venezuelan footballer

Personal information
- Full name: Brayan Jesús Alcócer Narváez
- Date of birth: 17 August 2003 (age 23)
- Place of birth: Ciudad Guayana, Venezuela
- Height: 1.72 m (5 ft 8 in)
- Position: Forward

Team information
- Current team: Deportivo La Guaira
- Number: 8

Youth career
- Mineros de Guayana

Senior career*
Years	Team	Apps	(Gls)
2019–2023	Mineros de Guayana	61	(11)
2023–2024	Boston River	6	(0)
2024	→ Universidad Central (loan)	21	(2)
2025–	Deportivo La Guaira	2	(0)

International career^{‡}
2022–	Venezuela U20	13	(8)
- * Club domestic league appearances and goals as of 8 February 2025 ‡ National team caps and goals as of 18 January 2023

Brayan Jesús Alcócer Narváez (born 17 August 2003) is a Venezuelan professional footballer who plays as a forward for Deportivo La Guaira.

== Club career ==
Alcócer was loaned to fellow Venezuelan Primera División club Deportivo La Guaira in 2020, but due to the COVID-19 pandemic in Venezuela, he did not feature. On his return to Mineros de Guayana for the 2021 season, he became the youngest player to score for Mineros in the Copa Sudamericana.

== International career ==
Alcócer has represented Venezuelan at youth international level. He starred for Venezuela at the 2023 South American U-20 Championship and has also played for the Venezuela national under-23 football team.

In June 2023, he took part in the Maurice Revello Tournament in France with Venezuela.

== Career statistics ==
=== Club ===
As of 13 February 2023.

Appearances and goals by club, season and competition
Club	Season	League			Cup		Continental		Other		Total	
Club	Season	Division	Apps	Goals	Apps	Goals	Apps	Goals	Apps	Goals	Apps	Goals
Mineros de Guayana	2019	Liga Venezolana	5	0	0	0	0	0	0	0	5	0
Mineros de Guayana	2020	Liga Venezolana	0	0	0	0	0	0	0	0	0	0
Mineros de Guayana	2021	Liga Venezolana	18	3	0	0	2 (Note: Appearances in the Copa Sudamericana)	1	0	0	20	4
Mineros de Guayana	2022	Liga Venezolana	24	4	0	0	0	0	0	0	24	4
Mineros de Guayana	2023	Liga Venezolana	0	0	0	0	0	0	0	0	0	0
Mineros de Guayana	Total		47	7	0	0	2	1	0	0	49	8
Deportivo La Guaira (loan)	2020	Liga Venezolana	0	0	0	0	0	0	0	0	0	0
Career total			47	7	0	0	2	1	0	0	49	8
