= Maxi González =

Argentine footballer

Personal information
- Full name: David Maximiliano González
- Date of birth: 4 May 2004 (age 22)
- Place of birth: Monte Grande, Buenos Aires, Argentina
- Position: Midfielder

Team information
- Current team: Godoy Cruz (on loan from Lanús)
- Number: 16

Youth career
- Lanús

Senior career*
Years	Team	Apps	(Gls)
2021–	Lanús	32	(1)
2024–2025	→ Defensa y Justicia (loan)	14	(0)
2025–	→ Godoy Cruz (loan)	7	(0)

International career
2022–	Argentina U20	4	(0)
- * Club domestic league appearances and goals as of 17:09, 17 November 2025 (UTC)

David Maximiliano "Maxi" González (born 4 May 2004) is an Argentine footballer currently playing as a midfielder for Godoy Cruz, on loan from Lanús and for the U-20 national team.

== International career ==
González was called up to the Argentina national under-20 football team for the 2022 Maurice Revello Tournament in France.

In January 2023, he was once again called up to the national under-20 football team ahead of the 2023 South American Championship.

== Career statistics ==
=== Club ===
As of 11 January 2023.

Club	Season	League			Cup		Continental		Other		Total	
Club	Season	Division	Apps	Goals	Apps	Goals	Apps	Goals	Apps	Goals	Apps	Goals
Lanús	2021	Primera División	2	0	0	0	0	0	0	0	2	0
Lanús	2022	Primera División	20	1	2	0	6	0	0	0	28	0
Career total			22	0	2	0	6	0	0	0	30	0
