= Rodrigo Chagas (footballer, born 2003) =

Uruguayan football player (born 2003)

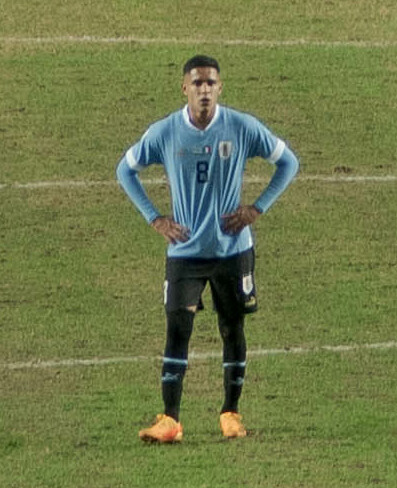
- Chagas in 2022

Personal information
- Full name: Rodrigo Sebastián Chagas Díaz
- Date of birth: 20 August 2003 (age 23)
- Place of birth: Artigas, Uruguay
- Height: 1.76 m (5 ft 9 in)
- Position: Midfielder

Team information
- Current team: CA Juventud (on loan from Nacional)
- Number: 22

Youth career
- Progreso de Artigas
- Nacional

Senior career*
Years	Team	Apps	(Gls)
2022–	Nacional	16	(0)
2025–	→ CA Juventud (loan)	19	(2)

International career^{‡}
2021–2023	Uruguay U20	33	(2)
2023–2024	Uruguay U23	9	(0)
2024–	Uruguay local	1	(0)
Medal record
Men's football
Representing Uruguay
FIFA U-20 World Cup
Winner	2023 Argentina
South American U-20 Championship
Runner-up	2023 Colombia
- * Club domestic league appearances and goals as of 1 October 2025 ‡ National team caps and goals as of 31 May 2024

Rodrigo Sebastián Chagas Díaz (born 20 August 2003) is a Uruguayan professional footballer who plays as a midfielder for CA Juventud, on loan from Nacional.

== International career ==
Chagas was part of the Uruguay under-20 team which won the 2023 FIFA U-20 World Cup and finished as runners-up at the 2023 South American U-20 Championship.

In January 2024, Chagas was named in Uruguay's squad for the 2024 CONMEBOL Pre-Olympic Tournament. In May 2024, he was named in the first ever squad of the Uruguay local national team. He made his Uruguay local team debut on 31 May 2024 in a goalless draw against Costa Rica.

== Honours ==
Uruguay U20

- FIFA U-20 World Cup: 2023
- South American U-20 Championship runner-up: 2023
