= Marcelo Broli =

Uruguayan footballer (born 1978)

Personal information
- Full name: Marcelo Carlo Broli Gorgoroso
- Date of birth: 13 March 1978 (age 48)
- Place of birth: Montevideo, Uruguay
- Height: 1.78 m (5 ft 10 in)
- Position: Defensive midfielder

Youth career
- Peñarol

Senior career*
Years	Team	Apps	(Gls)
1997	Huracán Buceo	6	(0)
1998–2000	Peñarol		
2001–2006	Fénix	99	(7)
2005–2006	→ Valladolid (loan)	16	(0)
2006–2007	Nacional	9	(0)
2007	Montevideo Wanderers	5	(0)
2008	Audax Italiano	20	(0)
2009–2012	Rampla Juniors	71	(4)
2012–2013	Juventud	20	(1)
2013–2014	Miramar Misiones	20	(0)

International career
2002–2003	Uruguay	3	(0)

Managerial career
- 2020: Villa Teresa
- 2021–2022: Peñarol (youth)
- 2022–2023: Uruguay U20
- 2023: Uruguay (interim)
- 2024–2026: United Arab Emirates U23
Medal record
Men's football
Representing Uruguay (as manager)
FIFA U-20 World Cup
Winner	2023 Argentina
South American U-20 Championship
Runner-up	2023 Colombia
- * Club domestic league appearances and goals

Marcelo Carlo Broli Gorgoroso (born 13 March 1978) is a Uruguayan professional football manager and former player. He is a younger brother of Martín Broli, former uruguayan footballer.

== Playing career ==
In the 2005–2006 season, Broli, along with his countrymen Fernando Correa, Oscar Javier Morales and Jorge Winston Curbelo, were signed by Valladolid.

== Coaching career ==
In October 2016, Broli was appointed assistant coach under Marcelo Méndez at Progreso. The duo left the club on 7 November 2018. From 1 January 2019, the duo took charge over Danubio. They were fired in September 2019.

One year after leaving Danubio, Broli got his first job as a head coach, when he was presented as the new coach of Villa Teresa on 8 September 2019. He left the position at the end of 2020.

On 27 January 2021, Broli took charge of Peñarol's U19 team.

On 28 February 2023, Broli was appointed as the caretaker manager of the Uruguay national team for friendly matches against Japan and South Korea.

== Managerial statistics ==
As of match played 11 June 2023

Team	From	To	Record				
Team	From	To	P	W	D	L	Win %
Villa Teresa	9 September 2020	31 December 2020	16	5	4	7	31.25
Uruguay U20	20 May 2022	Present	29	18	6	5	62.07
Uruguay (interim)	28 February 2023	11 May 2023	2	1	1	0	50.00
Total			47	24	11	12	51.06

== Honours ==
=== Manager ===
Peñarol U20

- U-20 Copa Libertadores: 2022

Uruguay U20

- FIFA U-20 World Cup: 2023
