= Matías Lazo =

Peruvian footballer (born 2003)

Personal information
- Full name: Matías Fernando Lazo Zapata
- Date of birth: 11 July 2003 (age 23)
- Place of birth: Arequipa, Peru
- Height: 1.88 m (6 ft 2 in)
- Position: Central defender

Team information
- Current team: FBC Melgar
- Number: 33

Youth career
- 2016: FBC Piérola
- 2017–2020: FBC Melgar

Senior career*
Years	Team	Apps	(Gls)
2020–	FBC Melgar	111	(4)

International career^{‡}
2022	Peru U20	8	(1)
2025–	Peru	3	(0)
- * Club domestic league appearances and goals as of 23:27, 1 November 2025 (UTC) ‡ National team caps and goals as of 20:05, 14 November 2026 (UTC)

Matías Fernando Lazo Zapata (born 11 July 2003) is a Peruvian footballer who plays as a defender for Peruvian Primera División club FBC Melgar and the Peru national team.

== International career ==
Lazo was called up to the Peru national team for a set of friendlies in October 2025.

== Career statistics ==
=== Club ===
As of 1 November 2025.

Club	Division	League			Cup		Continental		Total	
Club	Division	Season	Apps	Goals	Apps	Goals	Apps	Goals	Apps	Goals
FBC Melgar	2020	Peruvian Primera División	1	0	—		0	0	1	0
FBC Melgar	2021	Peruvian Primera División	5	0	0	0	4	0	9	0
FBC Melgar	2022	Peruvian Primera División	23	0	—		7	0	30	0
FBC Melgar	2023	Peruvian Primera División	19	0	—		0	0	19	0
FBC Melgar	2024	Peruvian Primera División	30	0	—		0	0	30	0
FBC Melgar	2025	Peruvian Primera División	33	4	—		10	0	43	4
Career total			111	4	0	0	11	0	132	4

=== International ===
As of match played on 14 November 2026

Appearances and goals by national team and year
National team	Year	Apps	Goals
Peru	2025	2	0
Peru	2026	1	0
Total		3	0

== Honours ==
FBC Melgar

- Torneo Apertura 2022
