= Ignacio "Nacho" Nava =

American promoter (1976–2019)

Ignacio Nava Jr.
- Died: January 19, 2019 (aged 42)
- Other name: Nacho Nava
- Occupations: Promoter, activist

Ignacio Nava Jr. (1976 – January 19, 2019), also known as Ignacio "Nacho" Nava, was an American nightlife promoter, activist, and co-founder of Mustache Mondays in Downtown Los Angeles.

== Early life and education ==
A native of West Covina, California, Nava had three siblings, Robert Angel, Giovanni, and Vee Beltran. His parents were Ignacio Sr. Nava and Diana Mayer. He attended Basset High School in La Puente, where he initially discovered his passion for event planning as the school's yearbook photographer.

In the early 2000s, he earned a scholarship to attend ArtCenter College of Design in Pasadena. However, he decided to attend the lofts in Downtown Los Angeles instead, right when the nightlife scene was growing the most, in time for his artistic visions to grow as well.

== Notable projects and works ==
In 2007, Nava started off his most known work, Mustache Monday's, alongside Danny Gonzales, Josh Peace, Dino Dinco, and other friends. Their main goal was to create a tale of "queer nightlife done right" for non-white, non-cisgender, and all queer individuals excluded from venues of Hollywood and West Hollywood. With their vision, Nava created an agenda for brown queer and transsexual individuals to enjoy Mustache Monday's music, performances, DJ sets, light and set designs, as well as merchandise. Throughout the decade of Mustache Monday's parties, he also invited a variety of local artists who would design event fliers and/or exhibit their own art performances as shows for the night. For many, Nava was able to provide them a home beyond just a party, his call to celebrating intersectionality was for many a very "magical experience".

In 2008, he donated Mustache Monday's revenues to Los Angeles LGBT Center's Jeffrey Goodman Special Care Clinic to help support HIV patients with their treatment expenses.

In 2018, he assembled a month-long filming of LGBTQ+ films that were screened around Los Angeles at the time. The same year, he also co-staged, alongside Ron Athey, "Dolores: Our Lady of the 7 Sorrows", a theater production where we experimented a lot by recruiting musicians, choreographers, and vocalists to interpret the famous catholic devotion choir, the "Seven Sorrows of Mary".

In 2019, he was featured in the collaborative mural Nostra Fiesta by Rafa Esparza, Gabriela Ruiz, and others; located at the New Jalisco Bar in Downtown, Los Angeles. This artwork showcases LGBTQ+ historical resistance, communities of color, nightlife as an artistic expression form, all in unison with the impact Nava had on the queer Los Angeles community.

== Death ==
At the age of 42, on January 19, 2019, Nava passed away due to pneumonia.
