= 2023 Copa Libertadores qualifying stages =

Qualifying stages of the 2023 Copa Libertadores

The 2023 Copa Libertadores qualifying stages were played from 7 February to 16 March 2023. A total of 19 teams competed in the qualifying stages to decide four of the 32 places in the group stage of the 2023 Copa Libertadores.

== Draw ==
The draw for the qualifying stages was held on 21 December 2022, 12:00 PYST (UTC−3), at the CONMEBOL Convention Centre in Luque, Paraguay.

Teams were seeded by their CONMEBOL Clubs ranking as of 9 December 2022 (shown in parentheses), taking into account the following three factors:

1. Performance in the last 10 years, taking into account Copa Libertadores and Copa Sudamericana results in the period 2013–2022.
2. Historical coefficient, taking into account Copa Libertadores and Copa Sudamericana results in the period 1960–2012 and 2002–2012 respectively.
3. Local tournament champion, with bonus points awarded to domestic league champions of the last 10 years.

For the first stage, the six teams were drawn into three ties (E1–E3), with the teams from Pot 1 hosting the second leg.

First stage draw
Pot 1	Pot 2
(Paraguay) Nacional (71); (Ecuador) El Nacional (73); (Venezuela) Zamora (99)	(Peru) Sport Huancayo (119); (Bolivia) Nacional Potosí (181); (Uruguay) Boston River (224)

For the second stage, the 16 teams were drawn into eight ties (C1–C8), with the teams from Pot 1 hosting the second leg. Teams from the same association could not be drawn into the same tie, excluding the three winners of the first stage, which were seeded in Pot 2 and whose identity was not known at the time of the draw, and could be drawn into the same tie with another team from the same association.

Second stage draw
Pot 1	Pot 2
(Brazil) Atlético Mineiro (11); (Paraguay) Cerro Porteño (15); (Peru) Sporting Cristal (35); (Colombia) Independiente Medellín (54); (Colombia) Millonarios (57); (Argentina) Huracán (58); (Bolivia) Always Ready (74); (Brazil) Fortaleza (78)	(Ecuador) Universidad Católica (90); (Venezuela) Carabobo (183); (Chile) Magallanes (215); (Chile) Curicó Unido (No rank); (Uruguay) Deportivo Maldonado (No rank); First stage winner E1; First stage winner E2; First stage winner E3

For the third stage, the eight winners of the second stage were allocated without any draw into the following four ties (G1–G4), with the team in each tie with the higher CONMEBOL ranking hosting the second leg.

- Second stage winner C1 vs. Second stage winner C8
- Second stage winner C2 vs. Second stage winner C7
- Second stage winner C3 vs. Second stage winner C6
- Second stage winner C4 vs. Second stage winner C5

== Format ==
In the qualifying stages, each tie was played on a home-and-away two-legged basis. If the teams had been tied on aggregate, extra time would not have been played, and a penalty shoot-out would have been used to determine the winner (Regulations Article 2.4.3).

== Bracket ==
The qualifying stages were structured as follows:

- First stage (6 teams): The three winners of the first stage advanced to the second stage to join the 13 teams which were given byes to the second stage.
- Second stage (16 teams): The eight winners of the second stage advanced to the third stage.
- Third stage (8 teams): The four winners of the third stage advanced to the group stage to join the 28 direct entrants. The four teams eliminated in the third stage entered the Copa Sudamericana group stage.

The bracket was decided based on the first stage draw and second stage draw, which was held on 21 December 2022.

=== Winner G1 ===
First stage
(Ecuador) Universidad Católica	Bye
(Colombia) Millonarios	Bye
(Venezuela) Carabobo	Bye
(Brazil) Atlético Mineiro	Bye

Second stage
(Ecuador) Universidad Católica	0	1	1
(Colombia) Millonarios	0	2	2
(Venezuela) Carabobo	0	1	1
(Brazil) Atlético Mineiro	0	3	3

Third stage
(Colombia) Millonarios	1	1	2
(Brazil) Atlético Mineiro	1	3	4

=== Winner G2 ===
First stage
(Uruguay) Boston River	3	1	4
(Venezuela) Zamora	1	0	1
(Argentina) Huracán	Bye
(Peru) Sport Huancayo	2	1	3
(Paraguay) Nacional	1	3	4
(Peru) Sporting Cristal	Bye

Second stage
(Uruguay) Boston River	0	0	0
(Argentina) Huracán	0	1	1
(Paraguay) Nacional	2	1	3
(Peru) Sporting Cristal	0	5	5

Third stage
(Argentina) Huracán	0	0	0
(Peru) Sporting Cristal	0	1	1

=== Winner G3 ===
First stage
(Uruguay) Deportivo Maldonado	Bye
(Brazil) Fortaleza	Bye
(Chile) Curicó Unido	Bye
(Paraguay) Cerro Porteño	Bye

Second stage
(Uruguay) Deportivo Maldonado	0	0	0
(Brazil) Fortaleza	0	4	4
(Chile) Curicó Unido	0	0	0
(Paraguay) Cerro Porteño	1	1	2

Third stage
(Brazil) Fortaleza	0	1	1
(Paraguay) Cerro Porteño	1	2	3

=== Winner G4 ===
First stage
(Chile) Magallanes	Bye
(Bolivia) Always Ready	Bye
(Bolivia) Nacional Potosí	1	1	2
(Ecuador) El Nacional	6	3	9
(Colombia) Independiente Medellín	Bye

Second stage
(Chile) Magallanes	3	3	6
(Bolivia) Always Ready	0	1	1
(Ecuador) El Nacional	2	1	3
(Colombia) Independiente Medellín	2	2	4

Third stage
(Chile) Magallanes	1	0	1
(Colombia) Independiente Medellín	1	2	3

== First stage ==
=== Summary ===
The first legs were played on 7–9 February, and the second legs were played on 14–16 February 2023.

Team 1	Agg.	Team 2	1st leg	2nd leg
Sport Huancayo (Peru)	3–4	(Paraguay) Nacional	2–1	1–3
Nacional Potosí (Bolivia)	2–9	(Ecuador) El Nacional	1–6	1–3
Boston River (Uruguay)	4–1	(Venezuela) Zamora	3–1	1–0

=== Matches ===
7 February 2023
19:00 UTC−5

Sport Huancayo (Peru)	2–1	(Paraguay) Nacional
Escobar 52'; Huaccha 90+6'	Report	Brizuela 69'

Estadio Huancayo, Huancayo
Attendance: 0 (Note: The Sport Huancayo v Nacional match was played behind closed doors due to security reasons related to the 2022–2023 Peruvian protests.)
Referee: Nicolás Gamboa (Chile)
14 February 2023
21:00 UTC−3

Nacional (Paraguay)	3–1	(Peru) Sport Huancayo
Ocampos 62'; Martínez 69'; Fleitas 90+8'	Report	Millán 39'

Estadio Defensores del Chaco, Asunción (Note: Nacional played their home matches at Estadio Defensores del Chaco, Asunción instead of their regular stadium Estadio Arsenio Erico, Asunción, which did not meet CONMEBOL requirements.)
Referee: Darío Herrera (Argentina)

Nacional won 4–3 on aggregate and advanced to the second stage (Match C2).

8 February 2023
20:00 UTC−4

Nacional Potosí (Bolivia)	1–6	(Ecuador) El Nacional
Prost 45+1'	Report	Ordóñez 5', 38'; W. Chalá 13'; Carrillo 16'; Solís 45+4'; Asprilla 89'

Estadio Hernando Siles, La Paz (Note: Nacional Potosí played their home match at Estadio Hernando Siles, La Paz instead of their regular stadium Estadio Víctor Agustín Ugarte, Potosí, which did not meet CONMEBOL requirements.)
Referee: Yender Herrera (Venezuela)
15 February 2023
19:00 UTC−5

El Nacional (Ecuador)	3–1	(Bolivia) Nacional Potosí
Micolta 18'; Julio 45'; Palacios 90+1'	Report	Cristaldo 55'

Estadio Olímpico Atahualpa, Quito
Referee: Bruno Arleu (Brazil) (Note: Referee Flávio de Souza from Brazil, who was originally assigned to the El Nacional v Nacional Potosí match, was replaced by Bruno Arleu from Brazil.)

El Nacional won 9–2 on aggregate and advanced to the second stage (Match C4).

9 February 2023
21:00 UTC−3

Boston River (Uruguay)	3–1	(Venezuela) Zamora
Costa 23'; Acuña 55'; Gómez 64'	Report	Magallán 75'

Estadio Centenario, Montevideo (Note: Boston River played their home matches at Estadio Centenario, Montevideo instead of their regular stadium Estadio Parque Artigas, Las Piedras, which did not meet CONMEBOL requirements.)
Referee: Wagner Magalhães (Brazil)
16 February 2023
20:00 UTC−4

Zamora (Venezuela)	0–1	(Uruguay) Boston River
	Report	Urretaviscaya 20'

Estadio Agustín Tovar, Barinas
Referee: Andrés Rojas (Colombia)

Boston River won 4–1 on aggregate and advanced to the second stage (Match C7).

== Second stage ==
=== Summary ===
The first legs were played on 21–23 February, and the second legs were played on 28 February – 2 March 2023.

Team 1	Agg.	Team 2	1st leg	2nd leg
Carabobo (Venezuela)	1–3	(Brazil) Atlético Mineiro	0–0	1–3
Nacional (Paraguay)	3–5	(Peru) Sporting Cristal	2–0	1–5
Deportivo Maldonado (Uruguay)	0–4	(Brazil) Fortaleza	0–0	0–4
El Nacional (Ecuador)	3–4	(Colombia) Independiente Medellín	2–2	1–2
Magallanes (Chile)	6–1	(Bolivia) Always Ready	3–0	3–1
Curicó Unido (Chile)	0–2	(Paraguay) Cerro Porteño	0–1	0–1
Boston River (Uruguay)	0–1	(Argentina) Huracán	0–0	0–1
Universidad Católica (Ecuador)	1–2	(Colombia) Millonarios	0–0	1–2

=== Matches ===
22 February 2023
20:30 UTC−4

Carabobo (Venezuela)	0–0	(Brazil) Atlético Mineiro
	Report

Estadio Olímpico de la UCV, Caracas (Note: Carabobo played their home match against Atlético Mineiro at Estadio Olímpico de la UCV, Caracas instead of their regular stadium Estadio Misael Delgado, Valencia.)
Attendance: 1,567
Referee: Gery Vargas (Bolivia)
1 March 2023
21:30 UTC−3

Atlético Mineiro (Brazil)	3–1	(Venezuela) Carabobo
Hulk 16'; Paulinho 18'; Edenílson 73'	Report	Pernía 45+3'

Mineirão, Belo Horizonte
Referee: Diego Haro (Peru)

Atlético Mineiro won 3–1 on aggregate and advanced to the third stage (Match G1).

21 February 2023
19:00 UTC−3

Nacional (Paraguay)	2–0	(Peru) Sporting Cristal
Martínez 46'; Aguilar 90+7'	Report

Estadio Defensores del Chaco, Asunción
Referee: Anderson Daronco (Brazil)
28 February 2023
19:00 UTC−5

Sporting Cristal (Peru)	5–1	(Paraguay) Nacional
Ávila 46', 67'; Ignácio 74'; Lora 89'; Corozo 90+5'	Report	Caballero 47'

Estadio Nacional, Lima (Note: Sporting Cristal played their home matches at Estadio Nacional, Lima instead of their regular stadium Estadio Alberto Gallardo, Lima, which did not meet CONMEBOL requirements.)
Attendance: 17,743
Referee: Cristian Garay (Chile)

Sporting Cristal won 5–3 on aggregate and advanced to the third stage (Match G2).

23 February 2023
21:00 UTC−3

Deportivo Maldonado (Uruguay)	0–0	(Brazil) Fortaleza
	Report

Estadio Domingo Burgueño, Maldonado
Referee: Carlos Betancur (Colombia)
2 March 2023
21:00 UTC−3

Fortaleza (Brazil)	4–0	(Uruguay) Deportivo Maldonado
Thiago Galhardo 45+5'; Lucero 83', 90+2'; Guilherme 86'	Report

Castelão, Fortaleza
Attendance: 52,502
Referee: Jesús Valenzuela (Venezuela)

Fortaleza won 4–0 on aggregate and advanced to the third stage (Match G3).

22 February 2023
17:00 UTC−5

El Nacional (Ecuador)	2–2	(Colombia) Independiente Medellín
Palacios 55'; Carrillo 67' (pen.)	Report	Valencia 19'; Londoño 87'

Estadio Rodrigo Paz Delgado, Quito (Note: El Nacional played their home match against Independiente Medellín at Estadio Rodrigo Paz Delgado, Quito instead of their regular stadium Estadio Olímpico Atahualpa, Quito.)
Referee: Gustavo Tejera (Uruguay)
1 March 2023
19:00 UTC−5

Independiente Medellín (Colombia)	2–1	(Ecuador) El Nacional
Monroy 67'; Cambindo 73'	Report	Parrales 90+2'

Estadio Atanasio Girardot, Medellín
Attendance: 23,500
Referee: Raphael Claus (Brazil)

Independiente Medellín won 4–3 on aggregate and advanced to the third stage (Match G4).

23 February 2023
19:00 UTC−3

Magallanes (Chile)	3–0	(Bolivia) Always Ready
Vilches 21'; Piñero 80'; Filla 89'	Report

Estadio El Teniente, Rancagua (Note: Magallanes played their home matches at Estadio El Teniente, Rancagua instead of their regular stadium Estadio Municipal Luis Navarro Avilés, Santiago, which did not meet CONMEBOL requirements.)
Referee: Andrés Merlos (Argentina)
2 March 2023
18:00 UTC−4

Always Ready (Bolivia)	1–3	(Chile) Magallanes
Reyes 90+1'	Report	M. Vásquez 9'; Alfaro 50'; Flores 53'

Estadio Hernando Siles, La Paz (Note: Always Ready played their home match at Estadio Hernando Siles, La Paz instead of their regular stadium Estadio Municipal de Villa Ingenio, El Alto, which did not meet CONMEBOL requirements.)
Referee: Alexis Herrera (Venezuela)

Magallanes won 6–1 on aggregate and advanced to the third stage (Match G4).

21 February 2023
21:00 UTC−3

Curicó Unido (Chile)	0–1	(Paraguay) Cerro Porteño
	Report	Patiño 89'

Estadio Monumental David Arellano, Santiago (Note: Curicó Unido played their home match at Estadio Monumental David Arellano, Santiago (originally scheduled at Estadio El Teniente, Rancagua) instead of their regular stadium Estadio La Granja, Curicó, which did not meet CONMEBOL requirements.)
Referee: Yael Falcón Pérez (Argentina)
28 February 2023
19:00 UTC−3

Cerro Porteño (Paraguay)	1–0	(Chile) Curicó Unido
Morales 51'	Report

Estadio General Pablo Rojas, Asunción
Attendance: 17,759
Referee: Wilmar Roldán (Colombia)

Cerro Porteño won 2–0 on aggregate and advanced to the third stage (Match G3).

22 February 2023
21:00 UTC−3

Boston River (Uruguay)	0–0	(Argentina) Huracán
	Report

Estadio Centenario, Montevideo
Referee: Wilmar Roldán (Colombia)
1 March 2023
19:00 UTC−3

Huracán (Argentina)	1–0	(Uruguay) Boston River
Cóccaro 45+7' (pen.)	Report

Estadio Tomás Adolfo Ducó, Buenos Aires
Referee: Wilton Sampaio (Brazil)

Huracán won 1–0 on aggregate and advanced to the third stage (Match G2).

23 February 2023
19:00 UTC−5

Universidad Católica (Ecuador)	0–0	(Colombia) Millonarios
	Report

Estadio Rodrigo Paz Delgado, Quito (Note: Universidad Católica played their home match against Millonarios at Estadio Rodrigo Paz Delgado, Quito instead of their regular stadium Estadio Olímpico Atahualpa, Quito which was reserved for a concert.)
Referee: Bráulio Machado (Brazil)
2 March 2023
19:00 UTC−5

Millonarios (Colombia)	2–1	(Ecuador) Universidad Católica
Castro 62'; Cataño 69'	Report	Díaz 38' (pen.)

Estadio El Campín, Bogotá
Attendance: 25,787
Referee: Facundo Tello (Argentina)

Millonarios won 2–1 on aggregate and advanced to the third stage (Match G1).

== Third stage ==
The first legs were played on 8–9 March, and the second legs were played on 15–16 March 2023.

Team 1	Agg.	Team 2	1st leg	2nd leg
Millonarios (Colombia)	2–4	(Brazil) Atlético Mineiro	1–1	1–3
Huracán (Argentina)	0–1	(Peru) Sporting Cristal	0–0	0–1
Fortaleza (Brazil)	1–3	(Paraguay) Cerro Porteño	0–1	1–2
Magallanes (Chile)	1–3	(Colombia) Independiente Medellín	1–1	0–2

=== Matches ===
8 March 2023
19:30 UTC−5

Millonarios (Colombia)	1–1	(Brazil) Atlético Mineiro
Silva 42'	Report	Paulinho 66'

Estadio El Campín, Bogotá
Attendance: 33,250
Referee: Piero Maza (Chile)
15 March 2023
21:30 UTC−3

Atlético Mineiro (Brazil)	3–1	(Colombia) Millonarios
Paulinho 49', 81'; Hulk 88'	Report	Uribe 90+3'

Mineirão, Belo Horizonte
Attendance: 42,169
Referee: Fernando Rapallini (Argentina)

Atlético Mineiro won 4–2 on aggregate and advanced to the group stage.

9 March 2023
21:00 UTC−3 (Note: The kickoff time of both legs in Match G2 was changed from 19:00 UTC−3 (17:00 UTC−5) to 21:00 UTC−3 (19:00 UTC−5).)

Huracán (Argentina)	0–0	(Peru) Sporting Cristal
	Report

Estadio Tomás Adolfo Ducó, Buenos Aires
Attendance: 8,288
Referee: Andrés Matonte (Uruguay)
16 March 2023
19:00 UTC−5

Sporting Cristal (Peru)	1–0	(Argentina) Huracán
Ávila 90+7'	Report

Estadio Nacional, Lima
Attendance: 35,832
Referee: Raphael Claus (Brazil)

Sporting Cristal won 1–0 on aggregate and advanced to the group stage.

9 March 2023
19:00 UTC−3 (Note: The kickoff time of both legs in Match G3 was changed from 21:00 UTC−3 to 19:00 UTC−3.)

Fortaleza (Brazil)	0–1	(Paraguay) Cerro Porteño
	Report	Churín 34'

Castelão, Fortaleza
Attendance: 42,275
Referee: Facundo Tello (Argentina)
16 March 2023
19:00 UTC−3

Cerro Porteño (Paraguay)	2–1	(Brazil) Fortaleza
Carrizo 38'; Aquino 62'	Report	Guilherme 90+2'

Estadio General Pablo Rojas, Asunción
Attendance: 35,928
Referee: Jesús Valenzuela (Venezuela)

Cerro Porteño won 3–1 on aggregate and advanced to the group stage.

8 March 2023
19:00 UTC−3

Magallanes (Chile)	1–1	(Colombia) Independiente Medellín
Zapata 90+5'	Report	Batalla 70'

Estadio El Teniente, Rancagua
Attendance: 2,334
Referee: Kevin Ortega (Peru)
15 March 2023
19:00 UTC−5

Independiente Medellín (Colombia)	2–0	(Chile) Magallanes
Pons 15', 39'	Report

Estadio Atanasio Girardot, Medellín
Attendance: 17,046
Referee: Wilton Sampaio (Brazil)

Independiente Medellín won 3–1 on aggregate and advanced to the group stage.
