= Matías Vásquez =

Chilean footballer

Personal information
- Full name: Matías Alonso Vásquez Poblete
- Date of birth: 12 January 2003 (age 23)
- Place of birth: Calera de Tango, Chile
- Height: 1.80 m (5 ft 11 in)
- Position: Defender

Team information
- Current team: Magallanes
- Number: 4

Youth career
- Magallanes

Senior career*
Years	Team	Apps	(Gls)
2021–	Magallanes	74	(2)

International career
2022–2023	Chile U20	7	(1)
2024	Chile U23	3	(0)
- * Club domestic league appearances and goals as of 31 December 2025

Matías Alonso Vásquez Poblete (12 January 2003) is a Chilean footballer who plays as a defender for Magallanes.

== Club career ==
A product of Magallanes, Vásquez made his senior debut in the 2–0 win against Deportes Santa Cruz on 12 January 2021. A player during a successful stint of the club, he was part of the squad that won the 2022 Primera B, the 2022 Copa Chile and the 2023 Supercopa de Chile. He continued with them for the 2023 Primera División and took part in both the 2023 Copa Libertadores and 2023 Copa Sudamericana.

== International career ==
Vásquez represented Chile U20 in friendlies and the 2023 South American Championship.

A year later, Vásquez represented the under 23's in the 2024 CONMEBOL Pre-Olympic Tournament.
