= Bruno Portugal =

Peruvian footballer (born 2003)

Personal information
- Full name: Bruno Fabricio Portugal Paredes
- Date of birth: 28 June 2003 (age 23)
- Place of birth: Arequipa, Peru
- Height: 1.84 m (6 ft 0 in)
- Position: Forward

Team information
- Current team: FBC Melgar

Youth career
- 2016: FBC Piérola
- 2017–2021: FBC Melgar

Senior career*
Years	Team	Apps	(Gls)
2021–	FBC Melgar	14	(1)
2025	→ Comerciantes Unidos (loan)	14	(1)
- * Club domestic league appearances and goals as of 30 December 2025

Bruno Fabricio Portugal Paredes (born 28 June 2003) is a Peruvian footballer who plays as a forward for FBC Melgar.

== Career statistics ==
=== Club ===
As of 14 February 2024

Club	Season	League			Cup		Continental		Total	
Club	Season	Division	Apps	Goals	Apps	Goals	Apps	Goals	Apps	Goals
FBC Melgar	2021	Peruvian Primera División	1	0	0	0	1	0	2	0
FBC Melgar	2022	Peruvian Primera División	2	1	—		1	0	3	1
FBC Melgar	2023	Peruvian Primera División	8	0	—		1	0	9	0
FBC Melgar	2024	Peruvian Primera División	0	0	—		1	0	1	0
Career total			11	1	0	0	4	0	15	1
