= Juanda Fuentes =

Colombian footballer

Personal information
- Full name: Juan David Fuentes Garrido
- Date of birth: 19 May 2003 (age 23)
- Place of birth: Montería, Colombia
- Height: 1.71 m (5 ft 7 in)
- Position: Forward

Team information
- Current team: Penafiel

Youth career
- Montcada
- Tecnofutbol
- Montcada
- 2017–2022: Barcelona

Senior career*
Years	Team	Apps	(Gls)
2022–2023	Barcelona B	26	(2)
2023–2024	Oostende	13	(2)
2024–2026	Andorra	19	(1)
2025–2026	→ Gimnàstic (loan)	35	(3)
2026–	Penafiel	0	(0)

International career^{‡}
2019–2021	Colombia U17	3	(0)
2022–	Colombia U20	1	(0)
- * Club domestic league appearances and goals as of 10 June 2026 ‡ National team caps and goals as of 4 January 2023

Juan David "Juanda" Fuentes Garrido (born 19 May 2003) is a Colombian professional footballer who plays as a forward for Liga Portugal 2 club FC Penafiel.

== Club career ==
Born in Montería, Colombia, to a Spanish father and Colombian mother, Fuentes moved to Spain at the age of four. He started his footballing career with EF Montcada, before spending a year-long spell at CF Tecnofutbol, followed by a return to Montcada, where he proved himself a prolific goalscorer - scoring 103 goals in one season.

Fuentes joined Barcelona in 2017, aged 14, and signed his first professional contract in July 2019. After impressing at youth level, he was called up to training with the Barcelona first team squad for the first time in November 2021. After continuing his good performances, and breaking into the Barcelona B team, he signed a contract renewal in September 2022.

On 26 August 2023, Fuentes signed a three-year contract with Oostende in Belgium. On 28 June of the following year, he agreed to a 1+2 year contract with FC Andorra in Primera Federación.

On 24 July 2025, after helping Andorra to achieve promotion to Segunda División, Fuentes was loaned to Gimnàstic de Tarragona in the third division, for one year. On 10 July 2026, he moved to Portuguese side FC Penafiel.

== International career ==
Fuentes has represented Colombia at youth international level.

== Career statistics ==
=== Club ===
As of matches played 11 March 2023

Appearances and goals by club, season and competition
Club	Season	League			Cup		Other		Total	
Club	Season	Division	Apps	Goals	Apps	Goals	Apps	Goals	Apps	Goals
Barcelona B	2022–23	Primera Federación	20	2	–		1 (Note: Appearances in the Copa Catalunya)	0	21	2
Career total			20	2	0	0	1	0	21	2
