= José Herrera (Bolivian footballer) =

Bolivian footballer (born 2003)

Personal information
- Full name: José Orlando Herrera Taborga
- Date of birth: 9 March 2003 (age 23)
- Place of birth: Pando, Bolivia
- Height: 1.81 m (5 ft 11 in)
- Position: Defensive midfielder

Team information
- Current team: Always Ready
- Number: 22

Youth career
- –2020: Club Bolívar

Senior career*
Years	Team	Apps	(Gls)
2020–2023	Club Bolívar	25	(1)
2024–	Always Ready	3	(0)

International career^{‡}
2022–	Bolivia	1	(0)
- * Club domestic league appearances and goals as of 12 April 2022 ‡ National team caps and goals as of 12 April 2022

José Herrera (born 9 March 2003), is a Bolivian professional footballer who plays as a defensive midfielder for Always Ready.
