= 2023 South American U-20 Championship =

CONMEBOL Sub 20 Colombia 2023

Tournament details
- Host country: Colombia
- Dates: 19 January – 12 February
- Teams: 10 (from 1 confederation)
- Venues: 4 (in 3 host cities)

Final positions
- Champions: Brazil (12th title)
- Runners-up: Uruguay
- Third place: Colombia
- Fourth place: Ecuador

Tournament statistics
- Matches played: 35
- Goals scored: 78 (2.23 per match)
- Top scorer(s): (Brazil) Vitor Roque (Brazil) Andrey Santos (6 goals each)

The 2023 South American U-20 Championship was the 30th edition of the South American U-20 Championship (Spanish: CONMEBOL Sudamericano Sub-20, Portuguese: CONMEBOL Sul-Americano Sub-20), the biennial international youth football championship organised by CONMEBOL for the men's under-20 national teams of South America. It was held in Colombia between 19 January and 12 February 2023.

The South American U-20 Championship returned after 4 years due to the COVID-19 pandemic forcing CONMEBOL to cancel the tournament in 2021.

The tournament served as qualifier for two international events. The top four teams qualified for the 2023 FIFA U-20 World Cup as the CONMEBOL representatives. The top three teams also qualified for the 2023 Pan American Games men's football tournament, in addition to Chile who automatically qualified as hosts.

After twelve years, Brazil won the tournament again after finishing first in the final stage's group, which meant the twelfth title in their history. Champions Brazil, runners-up Uruguay and the hosts and third place Colombia qualified for the 2023 FIFA U-20 World Cup and 2023 Pan American Games. Defending champions Ecuador managed to reach the last berth for the 2023 FIFA U-20 World Cup after finishing in fourth place.

Subsequently, Argentina qualified for the 2023 U-20 World Cup as hosts after FIFA awarded the country the rights to organize the tournament in place of the original hosts Indonesia. Argentina had failed to qualify for the World Cup after being eliminated in the first stage.

Uruguay would go on to win the 2023 U-20 World Cup that year.

== Teams ==
All ten CONMEBOL member national teams are eligible to enter the tournament.

Team	Appearance	Previous best performance
Argentina	28th	Champions (5 times, most recent 2015)
Bolivia	25th	Fourth place (2 times, most recent 1983)
Brazil	29th	Champions (11 times, most recent 2011)
Chile	30th	Runners-up (1 time, 1975)
Colombia (hosts)	28th	Champions (3 times, most recent 2013)
Ecuador (holders)	25th	Champions (1 time, 2019)
Paraguay	28th	Champions (1 time, 1971)
Peru	29th	Fourth place (5 times, most recent 1975)
Uruguay	29th	Champions (8 times, most recent 2017)
Venezuela	26th	Third place (2 times, most recent 2017)

== Venues ==
Colombia had been originally chosen to host the South American U-20 Championship that was to be held in 2021. That tournament ended up being canceled due to the COVID-19 pandemic, however, Colombia maintained its right to hold the South American U-20 Championship but in 2023. This was the fifth time that Colombia hosts the tournament having previously done so in 1964, 1987, 1992 and 2005.

Cali, Palmira and Bogotá were selected as host cities. Cali and Palmira hosted the first stage's matches in two venues, the Estadio Olímpico Pascual Guerrero and the Estadio Deportivo Cali. The final stage's matches were played in Bogotá also in two venues, the Estadio El Campín and the Estadio Metropolitano de Techo.

Cali	Palmira	Location of the host cities of the 2023 South American U-20 Championship.
Estadio; Pascual Guerrero	Estadio Deportivo Cali	Location of the host cities of the 2023 South American U-20 Championship.
Capacity: 35,405	Capacity: 42,000	Location of the host cities of the 2023 South American U-20 Championship.
Bogotá		Location of the host cities of the 2023 South American U-20 Championship.
Estadio El Campín	Estadio Metropolitano de Techo	Location of the host cities of the 2023 South American U-20 Championship.
Capacity: 36,343	Capacity: 8,000	Location of the host cities of the 2023 South American U-20 Championship.

== Match officials ==
On 9 December 2022, CONMEBOL announced a total of 11 referees and 22 assistant referees appointed for the tournament, included a Portuguese refereeing team. For the first time, a UEFA refereeing team will participate in the South American U-20 Championship as part of the UEFA–CONMEBOL memorandum of understanding signed in February 2020, which included a referee exchange programme.

Portuguese referee João Pinheiro was replaced by his fellow countryman António Nobre.

- (Argentina) Nicolás Lamolina
  - Assistants: Maximiliano Del Yesso and Facundo Rodríguez
- (Bolivia) Ivo Méndez
  - Assistants: Ariel Guizada and Carlos Tapia
- (Brazil) Braulio Machado
  - Assistants: Fabricio Vilarinho and Rafael Alves
- (Chile) Cristian Garay
  - Assistants: Claudio Urrutia and Alejandro Molina
- (Colombia) Carlos Ortega
  - Assistants: Jhon León and John Gallego
- (Ecuador) Guillermo Guerrero
  - Assistants: Ricardo Barén and Dennys Guerrero

- (Paraguay) Derlis López
  - Assistants: Roberto Cañete and Luis Onieva
- (Peru) Augusto Menéndez
  - Assistants: Stephen Atoche and Leonar Soto
- (Portugal) António Nobre
  - Assistants: Bruno Alves and Luciano Maia
- (Uruguay) Gustavo Tejera
  - Assistants: Andrés Nievas and Horacio Ferreiro
- (Venezuela) Yender Herrera
  - Assistants: Lubin Torrealba and Alberto Ponte

== Squads ==
Players born between 1 January 2003 and 31 December 2007 were eligible to compete in the tournament. Each team could register a maximum of 23 and a minimum of 19 players, including at least 3 goalkeepers (Regulations Articles 46 and 49).

== Draw ==
The draw of the tournament was held on 21 December 2022, 14:00 PYT (UTC−3), at the CONMEBOL headquarters in Luque, Paraguay. The ten teams were drawn into two groups of five. The hosts Colombia and defending champions Ecuador were seeded into Group A and Group B respectively and assigned to position 1 in their group, while the remaining teams were placed into four "pairing pots" according to their results in the 2019 South American U-20 Championship (shown in brackets).

Seeded	Pot 1	Pot 2	Pot 3	Pot 4
Colombia (4) (Hosts, assigned to A1); Ecuador (1) (Title holders, assigned to B1)	Argentina (2); Uruguay (3)	Brazil (5); Venezuela (6)	Chile (7); Paraguay (8)	Peru (9); Bolivia (10)

From each pot, the first team drawn was placed into Group A and the second team drawn was placed into Group B. In both groups, teams from pot 1 were allocated in position 2, teams from pot 2 in position 3, teams from pot 3 in position 4 and teams from pot 4 in position 5.

The draw resulted in the following groups:

Group A
Pos	Team
A1	Colombia
A2	Argentina
A3	Brazil
A4	Paraguay
A5	Peru

Group B
Pos	Team
B1	Ecuador
B2	Uruguay
B3	Venezuela
B4	Chile
B5	Bolivia

== First stage ==
The top three teams in each group advanced to the final stage.

Tiebreakers

In the first stage, teams were ranked according to points earned (3 points for a win, 1 point for a draw, 0 points for a loss). If tied on points, tiebreakers would be applied in the following order (Regulations Article 21):

1. Head-to-head result between tied teams;
  - Points in head-to-head matches among the tied teams;
  - Goal difference in head-to-head matches among the tied teams;
  - Goals scored in head-to-head matches among the tied teams;
2. Goal difference in all group matches;
3. Goals scored in all group matches;
4. Fewest red cards received;
5. Fewest yellow cards received;
6. Drawing of lots.

All match times are in COT (UTC−5), as listed by CONMEBOL.

=== Group A ===
Pos	Team	Pld	W	D	L	GF	GA	GD	Pts	Qualification
1	Brazil	4	3	1	0	9	3	+6	10	Final stage
2	Colombia (H)	4	2	2	0	5	3	+2	8	Final stage
3	Paraguay	4	2	1	1	5	4	+1	7	Final stage
4	Argentina	4	1	0	3	3	6	−3	3	
5	Peru	4	0	0	4	1	7	−6	0	

Source: CONMEBOL
Rules for classification: Tiebreakers
(H) Hosts
19 January 2023
17:00

Peru	0–3	Brazil
	Report	Vitor Roque 68', 81' (pen.); Andrey Santos 76'

Estadio Olímpico Pascual Guerrero, Cali
Referee: Guillermo Guerrero (Ecuador)
19 January 2023
19:30

Colombia	1–1	Paraguay
Luna 46'	Report	Wlk 6' (pen.)

Estadio Olímpico Pascual Guerrero, Cali
Referee: Gustavo Tejera (Uruguay)

21 January 2023
16:00

Paraguay	2–1	Argentina
Flores 32'; Wlk 56' (pen.)	Report	Perrone 34'

Estadio Olímpico Pascual Guerrero, Cali
Referee: Cristian Garay (Chile)
21 January 2023
18:30

Peru	1–2	Colombia
Vásquez 37'	Report	Cortés 45', 74'

Estadio Olímpico Pascual Guerrero, Cali
Referee: Yender Herrera (Venezuela)

23 January 2023
17:00

Paraguay	1–0	Peru
D. González 33'	Report

Estadio Olímpico Pascual Guerrero, Cali
Referee: Ivo Méndez (Bolivia)
23 January 2023
19:30

Argentina	1–3	Brazil
González 90'	Report	Biro 8'; Andrey Santos 36'; Vitor Roque 87' (pen.)

Estadio Olímpico Pascual Guerrero, Cali
Referee: Gustavo Tejera (Uruguay)

25 January 2023
17:00

Argentina	1–0	Peru
Infantino 41'	Report

Estadio Olímpico Pascual Guerrero, Cali
Referee: Yender Herrera (Venezuela)
25 January 2023
19:30

Brazil	1–1	Colombia
Andrey Santos 44'	Report	Puerta 31'

Estadio Olímpico Pascual Guerrero, Cali
Referee: Cristian Garay (Chile)

27 January 2023
19:30

Colombia	1–0	Argentina
J. Fuentes 75'	Report

Estadio Olímpico Pascual Guerrero, Cali
Referee: Guillermo Guerrero (Ecuador)
27 January 2023
19:30

Brazil	2–1	Paraguay
Stênio 30'; Ronald 55'	Report	Pereira 22'

Estadio Deportivo Cali, Palmira
Referee: Gustavo Tejera (Uruguay)

=== Group B ===
Pos	Team	Pld	W	D	L	GF	GA	GD	Pts	Qualification
1	Uruguay	4	3	1	0	11	2	+9	10	Final stage
2	Venezuela	4	2	0	2	2	4	−2	6	Final stage
3	Ecuador	4	1	2	1	3	3	0	5	Final stage
4	Chile	4	1	1	2	2	5	−3	4	
5	Bolivia	4	1	0	3	2	6	−4	3	

Source: CONMEBOL
Rules for classification: Tiebreakers
20 January 2023
17:00

Bolivia	1–0	Venezuela
Nava 52'	Report

Estadio Deportivo Cali, Palmira
Referee: Nicolás Lamolina (Argentina)
20 January 2023
19:30

Ecuador	1–1	Chile
Cuero 33'	Report	Conelli 25'

Estadio Deportivo Cali, Palmira
Referee: Carlos Ortega (Colombia)

22 January 2023
16:00

Bolivia	0–1	Ecuador
	Report	Durán 79' (o.g.)

Estadio Deportivo Cali, Palmira
Referee: António Nobre (Portugal)
22 January 2023
18:30

Chile	0–3	Uruguay
	Report	Díaz 4'; L. Rodríguez 7'; García 39'

Estadio Deportivo Cali, Palmira
Referee: Braulio Machado (Brazil)

24 January 2023
17:00

Uruguay	3–0	Venezuela
L. Rodríguez 24', 65'; Díaz 42'	Report

Estadio Deportivo Cali, Palmira
Referee: Augusto Menéndez (Peru)
24 January 2023
19:30

Chile	1–0	Bolivia
Assadi 19'	Report

Estadio Deportivo Cali, Palmira
Referee: Nicolás Lamolina (Argentina)

26 January 2023
17:00

Uruguay	4–1	Bolivia
Á. Rodríguez 68', 80', 90+6'; Díaz 90+5' (pen.)	Report	Luján 5' (pen.)

Estadio Deportivo Cali, Palmira
Referee: António Nobre (Portugal)
26 January 2023
19:30

Venezuela	1–0	Ecuador
Alcócer 15' (pen.)	Report

Estadio Deportivo Cali, Palmira
Referee: Braulio Machado (Brazil)

28 January 2023
18:30

Venezuela	1–0	Chile
Alcócer 48' (pen.)	Report

Estadio Olímpico Pascual Guerrero, Cali
Referee: António Nobre (Portugal)
28 January 2023
18:30

Ecuador	1–1	Uruguay
Cuero 13'	Report	Chagas 15'

Estadio Deportivo Cali, Palmira
Referee: Nicolás Lamolina (Argentina)

== Final stage ==
If teams finished level on points, the final rankings would be determined according to the same criteria as the first stage, taking into account only matches in the final stage.

All match times are in COT (UTC−5), as listed by CONMEBOL.

Pos	Team	Pld	W	D	L	GF	GA	GD	Pts	Qualification
1	Brazil (C)	5	4	1	0	10	1	+9	13	2023 FIFA U-20 World Cup & 2023 Pan American Games
2	Uruguay	5	4	0	1	8	4	+4	12	2023 FIFA U-20 World Cup & 2023 Pan American Games
3	Colombia (H)	5	3	1	1	6	2	+4	10	2023 FIFA U-20 World Cup & 2023 Pan American Games
4	Ecuador	5	1	1	3	5	8	−3	4	2023 FIFA U-20 World Cup
5	Venezuela	5	0	2	3	4	11	−7	2	
6	Paraguay	5	0	1	4	2	9	−7	1	

Source: CONMEBOL GloboEsporte
Rules for classification: Tiebreakers
(C) Champions; (H) Hosts
31 January 2023
15:00

Paraguay	1–1	Venezuela
Flores 50'	Report	Alcócer 77' (pen.)

Estadio Metropolitano de Techo, Bogotá
Referee: António Nobre (Portugal)
31 January 2023
17:30

Brazil	3–1	Ecuador
Vitor Roque 14', 28'; Andrey Santos 81'	Report	González 76'

Estadio El Campín, Bogotá
Referee: Augusto Menéndez (Peru)
31 January 2023
20:00

Uruguay	1–0	Colombia
Fa. González 78'	Report

Estadio El Campín, Bogotá
Referee: Cristian Garay (Chile)

3 February 2023
15:00

Uruguay	2–1	Ecuador
Díaz 35' (pen.); L. Rodríguez 85'	Report	Medina 13'

Estadio Metropolitano de Techo, Bogotá
Referee: António Nobre (Portugal)
3 February 2023
17:30

Brazil	3–0	Venezuela
Vitor Roque 49'; Pedro 85'; Andrey Santos 90'	Report

Estadio Metropolitano de Techo, Bogotá
Referee: Ivo Méndez (Bolivia)
3 February 2023
20:00

Colombia	3–0	Paraguay
Cabezas 29'; Cortés 40'; Puerta 88'	Report

Estadio El Campín, Bogotá
Referee: Nicolás Lamolina (Argentina)

6 February 2023
15:00

Venezuela	1–4	Uruguay
Alcócer 34' (pen.)	Report	Díaz 18' (pen.); Á. Rodríguez 35', 78'; Sosa 44'

Estadio Metropolitano de Techo, Bogotá
Referee: Braulio Machado (Brazil)
6 February 2023
17:30

Paraguay	0–2	Brazil
	Report	Giovane 10'; Ronald 81'

Estadio El Campín, Bogotá
Referee: Guillermo Guerrero (Ecuador)
6 February 2023
20:00

Colombia	1–0	Ecuador
Córdova 21' (o.g.)	Report

Estadio El Campín, Bogotá
Referee: Cristian Garay (Chile)

9 February 2023
15:00

Ecuador	1–1	Venezuela
C. Zambrano 90+1'	Report	Alcócer 3'

Estadio Metropolitano de Techo, Bogotá
Referee: Gustavo Tejera (Uruguay)
9 February 2023
17:30

Uruguay	1–0	Paraguay
L. Rodríguez 85'	Report

Estadio Metropolitano de Techo, Bogotá
Referee: António Nobre (Portugal)
9 February 2023
20:00

Colombia	0–0	Brazil
	Report

Estadio El Campín, Bogotá
Referee: Nicolás Lamolina (Argentina)

12 February 2023
16:00

Ecuador	2–1	Paraguay
Cuero 12', 73'	Report	D. González 81'

Estadio Metropolitano de Techo, Bogotá
Referee: Nicolás Lamolina (Argentina)
12 February 2023
16:00

Venezuela	1–2	Colombia
Cova 64'	Report	Manyoma 18'; Cabezas 39'

Estadio El Campín, Bogotá
Referee: António Nobre (Portugal)
12 February 2023
18:30

Brazil	2–0	Uruguay
Andrey Santos 84'; Pedro 90+2'	Report

Estadio El Campín, Bogotá
Referee: Cristian Garay (Chile)

== Goalscorers ==
There were 78 goals scored in 35 matches, for an average of 2.23 goals per match.

6 goals

- (Brazil) Vitor Roque
- (Brazil) Andrey Santos

5 goals

- (Uruguay) Fabricio Díaz
- (Uruguay) Álvaro Rodríguez
- (Uruguay) Luciano Rodríguez
- (Venezuela) Brayan Alcócer

4 goals

- (Ecuador) Justin Cuero

3 goals

- (Colombia) Óscar Cortés

2 goals

- (Brazil) Ronald Falkoski
- (Brazil) Pedro
- (Colombia) Jorge Cabezas Hurtado
- (Colombia) Gustavo Puerta
- (Paraguay) Gilberto Flores
- (Paraguay) Diego González
- (Paraguay) Allan Wlk

1 goal

- (Argentina) Maxi González
- (Argentina) Gino Infantino
- (Argentina) Máximo Perrone
- (Bolivia) Pablo Luján
- (Bolivia) Fernando Nava
- (Brazil) Guilherme Biro
- (Brazil) Giovane
- (Brazil) Stênio
- (Chile) Lucas Assadi
- (Chile) Vicente Conelli
- (Colombia) Juanda Fuentes
- (Colombia) Daniel Luna
- (Colombia) Alexis Manyoma
- (Ecuador) Sebastián González
- (Ecuador) Yaimar Medina
- (Ecuador) Cristhoper Zambrano
- (Paraguay) Kevin Pereira
- (Peru) Diether Vásquez
- (Uruguay) Rodrigo Chagas
- (Uruguay) Damián García
- (Uruguay) Facundo González
- (Uruguay) Ignacio Sosa
- (Venezuela) Alejandro Cova

1 own goal

- (Ecuador) Luis Córdova (against Colombia)
- Denilson Durán (against Bolivia)

== Qualification for international tournaments ==
=== Qualified teams for FIFA U-20 World Cup ===
The following five teams from CONMEBOL qualified for the 2023 FIFA U-20 World Cup, including Argentina which qualified as hosts.

Team	Qualified on	Previous appearances in FIFA U-20 World Cup^{1}
Uruguay	6 February 2023	15 (1977, 1979, 1981, 1983, 1991, 1993, 1997, 1999, 2007, 2009, 2011, 2013, 2015, 2017, 2019)
Brazil	6 February 2023	18 (1977, 1981, **1983**, **1985**, 1987, 1989, 1991, **1993**, 1995, 1997, 1999, 2001, **2003**, 2005, 2007, 2009, **2011**, 2015)
Colombia	9 February 2023	10 (1985, 1987, 1989, 1993, 2003, 2005, 2011, 2013, 2015, 2019)
Ecuador	12 February 2023	4 (2001, 2011, 2017, 2019)
Argentina	17 April 2023	16 (**1979**, 1981, 1983, 1989, 1991, **1995**, **1997**, 1999, **2001**, 2003, **2005**, **2007**, 2011, 2015, 2017, 2019)

^{1} Bold indicates champions for that year. Italic indicates hosts for that year.

=== Qualified teams for Pan American Games ===
The following four teams from CONMEBOL qualified for the 2023 Pan American Games men's football tournament, including Chile which qualified as hosts.

Team	Qualified on	Previous appearances in Pan American Games^{2}
Chile	4 November 2017	5 (1951, 1963, 1983, 1987, 1995)
Uruguay	6 February 2023	7 (1963, 1975, **1983**, 1999, 2011, **2015**, 2019)
Brazil	6 February 2023	11 (1959, **1963**, **1975**, **1979**, 1983, **1987**, 1995, 2003, 2007, 2011, 2015)
Colombia	9 February 2023	6 (1967, 1971, 1987, 1995, 2003, 2007)

^{2} Bold indicates champions for that year. Italic indicates hosts for that year.

== Broadcasting rights ==
=== Radio ===
- Colombia: Blu Radio, Caracol Radio, RCN Radio

=== Television ===
- Argentina: TyC Sports
- Brazil: TV Globo, SporTV
- Bolivia: Unitel
- Chile: Canal 13
- Colombia: Caracol Televisión, RCN Televisión, Telepacífico
- Ecuador: DSports
- Paraguay: GEN and Datisa
- Peru: DSports, Latina
- Uruguay: Dexary
- Venezuela: Televen
