= 2023 Copa Sudamericana final stages =

The 2023 Copa Sudamericana final stages were played from 11 July to 28 October 2023. A total of 24 teams competed in the final stages to decide the champions of the 2023 Copa Sudamericana, with the final played in Maldonado, Uruguay at Estadio Domingo Burgueño.

== Qualified teams ==
The winners and runners-up of each of the eight groups in the Copa Sudamericana group stage as well as the third-placed teams of each of the eight groups in the Copa Libertadores group stage advanced to the final stages. The eight Copa Sudamericana group runners-up faced the eight Copa Libertadores group third-placed teams in the knockout round play-offs, whilst the eight Copa Sudamericana group winners directly advanced to the round of 16.

=== Copa Sudamericana group stage winners and runners-up ===
Group	Winners	Runners-up
A	(Ecuador) LDU Quito	(Brazil) Botafogo
B	(Paraguay) Guaraní	(Ecuador) Emelec
C	(Brazil) Red Bull Bragantino	(Argentina) Estudiantes
D	(Brazil) São Paulo	(Argentina) Tigre
E	(Argentina) Newell's Old Boys	(Chile) Audax Italiano
F	(Argentina) Defensa y Justicia	(Brazil) América Mineiro
G	(Brazil) Goiás	(Peru) Universitario
H	(Brazil) Fortaleza	(Argentina) San Lorenzo

=== Copa Libertadores group stage third-placed teams ===
Group	Third-placed teams
A	(Chile) Ñublense
B	(Colombia) Independiente Medellín
C	(Ecuador) Barcelona
D	(Peru) Sporting Cristal
E	(Brazil) Corinthians
F	(Chile) Colo-Colo
G	(Paraguay) Libertad
H	(Argentina) Patronato

=== Seeding ===
Seed	Grp	Team	Pld	W	D	L	GF	GA	GD	Pts	Qualification
1	SD1	(Brazil) São Paulo	6	5	1	0	13	0	+13	16	Round of 16
2	SE1	(Argentina) Newell's Old Boys	6	5	1	0	11	4	+7	16	Round of 16
3	SH1	(Brazil) Fortaleza	6	5	0	1	17	5	+12	15	Round of 16
4	SF1	(Argentina) Defensa y Justicia	6	5	0	1	15	8	+7	15	Round of 16
5	SC1	(Brazil) Red Bull Bragantino	6	4	2	0	21	3	+18	14	Round of 16
6	SA1	(Ecuador) LDU Quito	6	3	3	0	10	2	+8	12	Round of 16
7	SG1	(Brazil) Goiás	6	3	3	0	7	3	+4	12	Round of 16
8	SB1	(Paraguay) Guaraní	6	3	2	1	9	7	+2	11	Round of 16
9	SC2	(Argentina) Estudiantes	6	4	2	0	14	1	+13	14	Play-off Match A
10	SE2	(Chile) Audax Italiano	6	3	2	1	7	4	+3	11	Play-off Match B
11	SA2	(Brazil) Botafogo	6	2	4	0	10	5	+5	10	Play-off Match C
12	SF2	(Brazil) América Mineiro	6	3	1	2	12	8	+4	10	Play-off Match D
13	SD2	(Argentina) Tigre	6	3	1	2	7	6	+1	10	Play-off Match E
14	SG2	(Peru) Universitario	6	3	1	2	6	5	+1	10	Play-off Match F
15	SB2	(Ecuador) Emelec	6	2	3	1	7	7	0	9	Play-off Match G
16	SH2	(Argentina) San Lorenzo	6	2	2	2	7	6	+1	8	Play-off Match H
17	LB	(Colombia) Independiente Medellín	6	3	1	2	10	9	+1	10	Play-off Match H
18	LD	(Peru) Sporting Cristal	6	2	2	2	8	10	−2	8	Play-off Match G
19	LE	(Brazil) Corinthians	6	2	1	3	7	6	+1	7	Play-off Match F
20	LG	(Paraguay) Libertad	6	2	1	3	6	7	−1	7	Play-off Match E
21	LF	(Chile) Colo-Colo	6	1	3	2	3	5	−2	6	Play-off Match D
22	LH	(Argentina) Patronato	6	2	0	4	6	11	−5	6	Play-off Match C
23	LA	(Chile) Ñublense	6	1	2	3	3	10	−7	5	Play-off Match B
24	LC	(Ecuador) Barcelona	6	1	1	4	7	12	−5	4	Play-off Match A

Source: CONMEBOL Sudamericana, CONMEBOL Libertadores
Rules for classification: 1) Higher position in group; 2) Points; 3) Goal difference; 4) Goals scored; 5) Away goals scored; 6) CONMEBOL ranking (Regulations Article 2.4.3).

== Format ==
Starting from the knockout round play-offs, the teams played a single-elimination tournament with the following rules:

- In the knockout round play-offs, round of 16, quarter-finals and semi-finals, each tie was played on a home-and-away two-legged basis, with the higher-seeded team hosting the second leg (Regulations Article 2.2.3). If tied on aggregate, extra time was not played, and a penalty shoot-out was used to determine the winners (Regulations Article 2.4.4).
- The final was played as a single match at a venue pre-selected by CONMEBOL, with the higher-seeded team designated as the "home" team for administrative purposes (Regulations Article 2.2.6). If tied after regulation, 30 minutes of extra time were played. If still tied after extra time, a penalty shoot-out was used to determine the winners (Regulations Article 2.4.5).

== Draw ==
The draw for the round of 16 was held on 5 July 2023, 12:00 PYT (UTC−4) at the CONMEBOL Convention Center in Luque, Paraguay. For the round of 16, the 16 teams were drawn into eight ties (A–H) between a Copa Sudamericana group winner (Pot 1) and a knockout round play-offs winner (Pot 2), with the group winners hosting the second leg. Teams from the same association or the same group could be drawn into the same tie (Regulations Article 2.2.3.2).

== Bracket ==
The bracket starting from the knockout round play-offs was determined as follows:

Round	Matchups
Knockout round play-offs	(Group runners-up host second leg, matchups pre-determined): Play-offs Match A: Seed 9 vs. Seed 24; Play-offs Match B: Seed 10 vs. Seed 23; Play-offs Match C: Seed 11 vs. Seed 22; Play-offs Match D: Seed 12 vs. Seed 21; Play-offs Match E: Seed 13 vs. Seed 20; Play-offs Match F: Seed 14 vs. Seed 19; Play-offs Match G: Seed 15 vs. Seed 18; Play-offs Match H: Seed 16 vs. Seed 17
Round of 16	(Group winners host second leg, matchups decided by draw): Match A; Match B; Match C; Match D; Match E; Match F; Match G; Match H
Quarter-finals	(Higher-seeded team host second leg): Match S1: Winner A vs. Winner H; Match S2: Winner B vs. Winner G; Match S3: Winner C vs. Winner F; Match S4: Winner D vs. Winner E
Semi-finals	(Higher-seeded team host second leg): Match F1: Winner S1 vs. Winner S4; Match F2: Winner S2 vs. Winner S3
Final	(Higher-seeded team designated as "home" team): Winner F1 vs. Winner F2

The bracket was decided based on the round of 16 draw, which was held on 5 July 2023.

Knockout round play-offs
19	(Brazil) Corinthians	1	2	3
14	(Peru) Universitario	0	1	1
24	(Ecuador) Barcelona	2	0	2
9	(Argentina) Estudiantes	1	4	5
21	(Chile) Colo-Colo	2	1	3
12	(Brazil) América Mineiro	1	5	6
20	(Paraguay) Libertad	2	1	3
13	(Argentina) Tigre	1	0	1
23	(Chile) Ñublense	0	1	1
10	(Chile) Audax Italiano	0	0	0
17	(Colombia) Independiente Medellín	0	0	0
16	(Argentina) San Lorenzo	1	2	3
22	(Argentina) Patronato	0	1	1
11	(Brazil) Botafogo	2	1	3
18	(Peru) Sporting Cristal	0	0	0
15	(Ecuador) Emelec	1	0	1

Round of 16
19	(Brazil) Corinthians	2	0	2
2	(Argentina) Newell's Old Boys	1	0	1
9	(Argentina) Estudiantes	3	2	5
7	(Brazil) Goiás	0	0	0
12	(Brazil) América Mineiro (p)	1	3	4 (4)
5	(Brazil) Red Bull Bragantino	1	3	4 (3)
20	(Paraguay) Libertad	0	1	1
3	(Brazil) Fortaleza	1	1	2
23	(Chile) Ñublense	0	3	3 (3)
6	(Ecuador) LDU Quito (p)	1	2	3 (4)
16	(Argentina) San Lorenzo	1	0	1
1	(Brazil) São Paulo	0	2	2
11	(Brazil) Botafogo	2	0	2
8	(Paraguay) Guaraní	1	0	1
15	(Ecuador) Emelec	1	0	1
4	(Argentina) Defensa y Justicia	2	1	3

Quarter-finals
19	(Brazil) Corinthians (p)	1	0	1 (3)
9	(Argentina) Estudiantes	0	1	1 (2)
12	(Brazil) América Mineiro	1	1	2
3	(Brazil) Fortaleza	3	2	5
6	(Ecuador) LDU Quito (p)	2	0	2 (5)
1	(Brazil) São Paulo	1	1	2 (4)
11	(Brazil) Botafogo	1	1	2
4	(Argentina) Defensa y Justicia	1	2	3

Semi-finals
19	(Brazil) Corinthians	1	0	1
3	(Brazil) Fortaleza	1	2	3
6	(Ecuador) LDU Quito	3	0	3
4	(Argentina) Defensa y Justicia	0	0	0

Final
28 October – Maldonado
3	(Brazil) Fortaleza	1 (3)
6	(Ecuador) LDU Quito (p)	1 (4)

== Knockout round play-offs ==
=== Summary ===
The first legs were played on 11–13 July, and the second legs were played on 18–21 July 2023.

Team 1	Agg.	Team 2	1st leg	2nd leg
Barcelona (Ecuador)	2–5	(Argentina) Estudiantes	2–1	0–4
Ñublense (Chile)	1–0	(Chile) Audax Italiano	0–0	1–0
Patronato (Argentina)	1–3	(Brazil) Botafogo	0–2	1–1
Colo-Colo (Chile)	3–6	(Brazil) América Mineiro	2–1	1–5
Libertad (Paraguay)	3–1	(Argentina) Tigre	2–1	1–0
Corinthians (Brazil)	3–1	(Peru) Universitario	1–0	2–1
Sporting Cristal (Peru)	0–1	(Ecuador) Emelec	0–1	0–0
Independiente Medellín (Colombia)	0–3	(Argentina) San Lorenzo	0–1	0–2

=== Matches ===
11 July 2023
19:00 UTC−5

Barcelona (Ecuador)	2–1	(Argentina) Estudiantes
Martínez 29'; Corozo 78'	Report	Godoy 45'

Estadio Monumental Isidro Romero Carbo, Guayaquil
Attendance: 4,931
Referee: Gustavo Tejera (Uruguay)
18 July 2023
21:00 UTC−3

Estudiantes (Argentina)	4–0	(Ecuador) Barcelona
Méndez 6', 19'; Rollheiser 38'; Carrillo 48'	Report

Estadio Jorge Luis Hirschi, La Plata
Attendance: 17,289
Referee: Wilton Sampaio (Brazil)

Estudiantes won 5–2 on aggregate and advanced to the round of 16 (Match B).

13 July 2023
18:00 UTC−4

Ñublense (Chile)	0–0	(Chile) Audax Italiano
	Report

Estadio Ester Roa, Concepción (Note: Ñublense played their home matches at Estadio Ester Roa, Concepción instead of their regular stadium Estadio Municipal Nelson Oyarzún Arenas, Chillán which did not meet CONMEBOL requirements.)
Referee: Flavio de Souza (Brazil)
21 July 2023 (Note: The Audax Italiano vs. Ñublense match, originally scheduled for 20 July 2023, 18:00 local time at Estadio Ester Roa, Concepción was suspended due to heavy rainfall and was rescheduled to 21 July 2023 at Estadio El Teniente, Rancagua.)
18:00 UTC−4

Audax Italiano (Chile)	0–1	(Chile) Ñublense
	Report	Oyarzo 50'

Estadio El Teniente, Rancagua (Note: Audax Italiano played their home match at Estadio El Teniente, Rancagua (originally scheduled at Estadio Ester Roa, Concepción) instead of their regular stadium Estadio Bicentenario de La Florida, Santiago which did not meet CONMEBOL requirements.)
Referee: Facundo Tello (Argentina)

Ñublense won 1–0 on aggregate and advanced to the round of 16 (Match E).

12 July 2023
19:00 UTC−3

Patronato (Argentina)	0–2	(Brazil) Botafogo
	Report	Carlos Alberto 52'; Janderson 65'

Estadio Presbítero Bartolomé Grella, Paraná
Attendance: 3,759
Referee: Gery Vargas (Bolivia)
19 July 2023
19:00 UTC−3

Botafogo (Brazil)	1–1	(Argentina) Patronato
Luis Henrique 3'	Report	Arce 67'

Estádio Olímpico Nilton Santos, Rio de Janeiro
Attendance: 20,509
Referee: Kevin Ortega (Peru)

Botafogo won 3–1 on aggregate and advanced to the round of 16 (Match H).

11 July 2023
18:00 UTC−4

Colo-Colo (Chile)	2–1	(Brazil) América Mineiro
Gil 46', 63'	Report	Alê 90+3'

Estadio Monumental David Arellano, Santiago
Attendance: 29,700
Referee: Fernando Rapallini (Argentina)
18 July 2023
19:00 UTC−3

América Mineiro (Brazil)	5–1	(Chile) Colo-Colo
Matheusinho 6', 25'; Mastriani 21', 85'; Saldivia 90+4' (o.g.)	Report	Thompson 62'

Arena Independência, Belo Horizonte
Referee: Darío Herrera (Argentina)

América Mineiro won 6–3 on aggregate and advanced to the round of 16 (Match C).

13 July 2023
20:00 UTC−4

Libertad (Paraguay)	2–1	(Argentina) Tigre
Melgarejo 51'; Cardozo 88'	Report	Armoa 35'

Estadio Defensores del Chaco, Asunción (Note: Libertad played their home matches at Estadio Defensores del Chaco, Asunción instead of their regular stadium Estadio Tigo La Huerta, Asunción which did not meet CONMEBOL requirements.)
Referee: Cristian Garay (Chile)
20 July 2023
21:00 UTC−3

Tigre (Argentina)	0–1	(Paraguay) Libertad
	Report	Barboza 24'

Estadio José Dellagiovanna, Victoria
Referee: Andrés Rojas (Colombia)

Libertad won 3–1 on aggregate and advanced to the round of 16 (Match F).

11 July 2023
21:30 UTC−3

Corinthians (Brazil)	1–0	(Peru) Universitario
Felipe Augusto 79'	Report

Neo Química Arena, São Paulo
Attendance: 36,686
Referee: Jesús Valenzuela (Venezuela)
18 July 2023
19:30 UTC−5

Universitario (Peru)	1–2	(Brazil) Corinthians
Flores 77' (pen.)	Report	Maycon 70'; Ryan 90+2'

Estadio Monumental, Lima
Attendance: 46,811
Referee: Wilmar Roldán (Colombia)

Corinthians won 3–1 on aggregate and advanced to the round of 16 (Match G).

12 July 2023
19:00 UTC−5

Sporting Cristal (Peru)	0–1	(Ecuador) Emelec
	Report	Cevallos 52'

Estadio Nacional, Lima (Note: Sporting Cristal played their home match at Estadio Nacional, Lima instead of their regular stadium Estadio Alberto Gallardo, Lima which did not meet CONMEBOL requirements.)
Referee: Raphael Claus (Brazil)
19 July 2023
19:00 UTC−5

Emelec (Ecuador)	0–0	(Peru) Sporting Cristal
	Report

Estadio George Capwell, Guayaquil
Attendance: 20,729
Referee: Piero Maza (Chile)

Emelec won 1–0 on aggregate and advanced to the round of 16 (Match A).

12 July 2023
19:00 UTC−5

Independiente Medellín (Colombia)	0–1	(Argentina) San Lorenzo
	Report	Bareiro 67'

Estadio Atanasio Girardot, Medellín
Referee: Alexis Herrera (Venezuela)
19 July 2023
21:00 UTC−3

San Lorenzo (Argentina)	2–0	(Colombia) Independiente Medellín
Bareiro 25' (pen.), 80' (pen.)	Report

Estadio Pedro Bidegain, Buenos Aires
Referee: Anderson Daronco (Brazil)

San Lorenzo won 3–0 on aggregate and advanced to the round of 16 (Match D).

== Round of 16 ==
=== Summary ===
The first legs were played on 1–3 August, and the second legs were played on 8–10 August 2023.

Team 1	Agg.	Team 2	1st leg	2nd leg
Emelec (Ecuador)	1–3	(Argentina) Defensa y Justicia	1–2	0–1
Estudiantes (Argentina)	5–0	(Brazil) Goiás	3–0	2–0
América Mineiro (Brazil)	4–4 (4–3 p)	(Brazil) Red Bull Bragantino	1–1	3–3
San Lorenzo (Argentina)	1–2	(Brazil) São Paulo	1–0	0–2
Ñublense (Chile)	3–3 (3–4 p)	(Ecuador) LDU Quito	0–1	3–2
Libertad (Paraguay)	1–2	(Brazil) Fortaleza	0–1	1–1
Corinthians (Brazil)	2–1	(Argentina) Newell's Old Boys	2–1	0–0
Botafogo (Brazil)	2–1	(Paraguay) Guaraní	2–1	0–0

=== Matches ===
1 August 2023
19:00 UTC−5

Emelec (Ecuador)	1–2	(Argentina) Defensa y Justicia
Carabalí 5'	Report	Fernández 87'; Togni 90+1'

Estadio George Capwell, Guayaquil
Attendance: 14,812
Referee: Flavio de Souza (Brazil)
8 August 2022
21:00 UTC−3

Defensa y Justicia (Argentina)	1–0	(Ecuador) Emelec
Barbona 62'	Report

Estadio Único Diego Armando Maradona, La Plata (Note: Defensa y Justicia played their home match against Emelec at Estadio Único Diego Armando Maradona, La Plata (originally scheduled at Estadio Juan Carmelo Zerillo, La Plata) instead of their regular stadium Estadio Norberto Tomaghello, Gobernador Costa which did not meet CONMEBOL requirements.)
Attendance: 8,754
Referee: Wilton Sampaio (Brazil)

Defensa y Justicia won 3–1 on aggregate and advanced to the quarter-finals (Match S1).

2 August 2023
19:00 UTC−3

Estudiantes (Argentina)	3–0	(Brazil) Goiás
Carrillo 54'; Rollheiser 63', 84'	Report

Estadio Jorge Luis Hirschi, La Plata
Referee: Andrés Rojas (Colombia)
9 August 2023
19:00 UTC−3

Goiás (Brazil)	0–2	(Argentina) Estudiantes
	Report	Benedetti 5'; Rollheiser 50'

Estádio Serra Dourada, Goiânia (Note: Goiás played their home match at Estadio Serra Dourada, Goiânia instead of their regular stadium Estádio da Serrinha, Goiânia which did not meet CONMEBOL requirements.)
Attendance: 34,337
Referee: Gery Vargas (Bolivia)

Estudiantes won 5–0 on aggregate and advanced to the quarter-finals (Match S2).

3 August 2023
21:00 UTC−3

América Mineiro (Brazil)	1–1	(Brazil) Red Bull Bragantino
Mastriani 73'	Report	Éder 41' (o.g.)

Arena Independência, Belo Horizonte
Attendance: 2,546
Referee: Gery Vargas (Bolivia)
10 August 2023
21:00 UTC−3

Red Bull Bragantino (Brazil)	3–3	(Brazil) América Mineiro
Sorriso 5', 45+3'; Ortiz 57'	Report	Mastriani 45+1', 90+10' (pen.); Éder 45+5'
Penalties
Ortiz (penalty missed); Lucas Evangelista (penalty scored); Luan Cândido (penalty scored); Juninho Capixaba (penalty scored); Borbas (penalty missed)	3–4	(penalty missed) Mastriani; (penalty scored) Everaldo; (penalty scored) Éder; (penalty scored) Júlio; (penalty scored) Alê

Neo Química Arena, São Paulo (Note: Red Bull Bragantino played their home match at Neo Química Arena, São Paulo instead of their regular stadium Estádio Nabi Abi Chedid, Bragança Paulista which did not meet CONMEBOL requirements.)
Referee: Jhon Ospina (Colombia)

Tied 4–4 on aggregate, América Mineiro won on penalties and advanced to the quarter-finals (Match S3).

3 August 2023
19:00 UTC−3

San Lorenzo (Argentina)	1–0	(Brazil) São Paulo
Bareiro 51'	Report

Estadio Pedro Bidegain, Buenos Aires
Attendance: 12,736
Referee: Wilmar Roldán (Colombia)
10 August 2023
19:00 UTC−3

São Paulo (Brazil)	2–0	(Argentina) San Lorenzo
Calleri 45'; Luciano 67'	Report

Estádio do Morumbi, São Paulo
Attendance: 51,816
Referee: Esteban Ostojich (Uruguay)

São Paulo won 2–1 on aggregate and advanced to the quarter-finals (Match S4).

3 August 2023
20:00 UTC−4

Ñublense (Chile)	0–1	(Ecuador) LDU Quito
	Report	Guerrero 60'

Estadio Ester Roa, Concepción
Attendance: 6,524
Referee: Kevin Ortega (Peru)
10 August 2023
19:00 UTC−5

LDU Quito (Ecuador)	2–3	(Chile) Ñublense
Julio 26'; González 90+1'	Report	Rubio 35' (pen.); Mina 60' (o.g.); Rivera 90+3'
Penalties
Guerrero (penalty scored); Alzugaray (penalty scored); Quiñonez (penalty scored); González (penalty scored)	4–3	(penalty scored) Cerezo; (penalty scored) Reyes; (penalty missed) Rivera; (penalty scored) Sosa; (penalty missed) Rubio

Estadio Rodrigo Paz Delgado, Quito
Referee: Yael Falcón Pérez (Argentina)

Tied 3–3 on aggregate, LDU Quito won on penalties and advanced to the quarter-finals (Match S4).

1 August 2023
18:00 UTC−4

Libertad (Paraguay)	0–1	(Brazil) Fortaleza
	Report	Zé Welison 20'

Estadio Defensores del Chaco, Asunción
Attendance: 8,165
Referee: Alexis Herrera (Venezuela)
8 August 2023
19:00 UTC−3

Fortaleza (Brazil)	1–1	(Paraguay) Libertad
Marinho 90+1'	Report	Espinoza 44'

Castelão, Fortaleza
Attendance: 50,542
Referee: Facundo Tello (Argentina)

Fortaleza won 2–1 on aggregate and advanced to the quarter-finals (Match S3).

1 August 2023
21:30 UTC−3

Corinthians (Brazil)	2–1	(Argentina) Newell's Old Boys
Yuri Alberto 57' (pen.); Wesley 65'	Report	Portillo 45+4'

Neo Química Arena, São Paulo
Attendance: 40,251
Referee: Gustavo Tejera (Uruguay)
8 August 2023
21:30 UTC−3

Newell's Old Boys (Argentina)	0–0	(Brazil) Corinthians
	Report

Estadio Marcelo Bielsa, Rosario
Referee: Andrés Rojas (Colombia)

Corinthians won 2–1 on aggregate and advanced to the quarter-finals (Match S2).

2 August 2023
19:00 UTC−3

Botafogo (Brazil)	2–1	(Paraguay) Guaraní
Hugo 65'; Tiquinho Soares 90' (pen.)	Report	R. Benítez 3'

Estádio Olímpico Nilton Santos, Rio de Janeiro
Attendance: 23,916
Referee: Andrés Matonte (Uruguay)
9 August 2023
18:00 UTC−4

Guaraní (Paraguay)	0–0	(Brazil) Botafogo
	Report

Estadio Defensores del Chaco, Asunción (Note: Guaraní played their home match at Estadio Defensores del Chaco, Asunción (originally scheduled at Estadio Manuel Ferreira, Asunción) instead of their regular stadium Estadio Rogelio Livieres, Asunción which did not meet CONMEBOL requirements.)
Attendance: 4,273
Referee: Felipe González (Chile)

Botafogo won 2–1 on aggregate and advanced to the quarter-finals (Match S1).

== Quarter-finals ==
=== Summary ===
The first legs were played on 22–24 August, and the second legs were played on 29–31 August 2023.

Team 1	Agg.	Team 2	1st leg	2nd leg
Botafogo (Brazil)	2–3	(Argentina) Defensa y Justicia	1–1	1–2
Corinthians (Brazil)	1–1 (3–2 p)	(Argentina) Estudiantes	1–0	0–1
América Mineiro (Brazil)	2–5	(Brazil) Fortaleza	1–3	1–2
LDU Quito (Ecuador)	2–2 (5–4 p)	(Brazil) São Paulo	2–1	0–1

=== Matches ===
23 August 2023
19:00 UTC−3

Botafogo (Brazil)	1–1	(Argentina) Defensa y Justicia
Gabriel 56'	Report	Tripichio 78'

Estádio Olímpico Nilton Santos, Rio de Janeiro
Attendance: 25,255
Referee: Gery Vargas (Bolivia)
30 August 2023
19:00 UTC−3

Defensa y Justicia (Argentina)	2–1	(Brazil) Botafogo
Fernández 15', 72'	Report	Bologna 45+3' (o.g.)

Estadio Florencio Sola, Banfield (Note: Defensa y Justicia played their home match against Botafogo at Estadio Florencio Sola, Banfield (originally scheduled at Estadio Ciudad de Lanús, Lanús) instead of their regular stadium Estadio Norberto Tomaghello, Gobernador Costa which did not meet CONMEBOL requirements.)
Attendance: 16,648
Referee: Jhon Ospina (Colombia)

Defensa y Justicia won 3–2 on aggregate and advanced to the semi-finals (Match F1).

22 August 2023
21:30 UTC−3

Corinthians (Brazil)	1–0	(Argentina) Estudiantes
Gil 17'	Report

Neo Química Arena, São Paulo
Attendance: 35,572
Referee: Jesús Valenzuela (Venezuela)
29 August 2023
21:30 UTC−3

Estudiantes (Argentina)	1–0	(Brazil) Corinthians
Méndez 1'	Report
Penalties
Sosa (penalty scored); Rollheiser (penalty missed); Lollo (penalty missed); Méndez (penalty scored); Ascacíbar (penalty missed)	2–3	(penalty scored) Fábio Santos; (penalty missed) Giuliano; (penalty scored) Vera; (penalty scored) Rojas

Estadio Jorge Luis Hirschi, La Plata
Attendance: 23,082
Referee: Wilmar Roldán (Colombia)

Tied 1–1 on aggregate, Corinthians won on penalties and advanced to the semi-finals (Match F2).

24 August 2023
19:00 UTC−3

América Mineiro (Brazil)	1–3	(Brazil) Fortaleza
Mastriani 69'	Report	Guilherme 15', 41'; Pochettino 21'

Arena Independência, Belo Horizonte
Attendance: 3,301
Referee: Wilmar Roldán (Colombia)
31 August 2023
19:00 UTC−3

Fortaleza (Brazil)	2–1	(Brazil) América Mineiro
Guilherme 22'; Marinho 66'	Report	Breno 89'

Castelão, Fortaleza
Attendance: 56,916
Referee: Felipe González (Chile)

Fortaleza won 5–2 on aggregate and advanced to the semi-finals (Match F2).

24 August 2023
17:00 UTC−5

LDU Quito (Ecuador)	2–1	(Brazil) São Paulo
Julio 2'; Ibarra 25'	Report	Moura 80'

Estadio Rodrigo Paz Delgado, Quito
Attendance: 30,648
Referee: Jhon Ospina (Colombia)
31 August 2023
19:00 UTC−3

São Paulo (Brazil)	1–0	(Ecuador) LDU Quito
Arboleda 77'	Report
Penalties
Calleri (penalty scored); Rodríguez (penalty missed); Moura (penalty scored); Beraldo (penalty scored); Wellington Rato (penalty scored)	4–5	(penalty scored) Guerrero; (penalty scored) Alzugaray; (penalty scored) Martínez; (penalty scored) Quiñónez; (penalty scored) Julio

Estádio do Morumbi, São Paulo
Attendance: 52,658
Referee: Alexis Herrera (Venezuela)

Tied 2–2 on aggregate, LDU Quito won on penalties and advanced to the semi-finals (Match F1).

== Semi-finals ==
=== Summary ===
The first legs were played on 26 and 27 September, and the second legs were played on 3 and 4 October 2023.

Team 1	Agg.	Team 2	1st leg	2nd leg
LDU Quito (Ecuador)	3–0	(Argentina) Defensa y Justicia	3–0	0–0
Corinthians (Brazil)	1–3	(Brazil) Fortaleza	1–1	0–2

=== Matches ===
27 September 2023
17:00 UTC−5

LDU Quito (Ecuador)	3–0	(Argentina) Defensa y Justicia
Guerrero 17', 42'; Piovi 88'	Report

Estadio Rodrigo Paz Delgado, Quito
Referee: Raphael Claus (Brazil)
4 October 2023
19:00 UTC−3

Defensa y Justicia (Argentina)	0–0	(Ecuador) LDU Quito
	Report

Estadio Ciudad de Lanús, Lanús (Note: Defensa y Justicia played their home match against LDU Quito at Estadio Ciudad de Lanús, Lanús (originally scheduled at Estadio Florencio Sola, Banfield) instead of their regular stadium Estadio Norberto Tomaghello, Gobernador Costa which did not meet CONMEBOL requirements.)
Attendance: 11,540
Referee: Piero Maza (Chile)

LDU Quito won 3–0 on aggregate and advanced to the final.

26 September 2023
21:30 UTC−3

Corinthians (Brazil)	1–1	(Brazil) Fortaleza
Yuri Alberto 40'	Report	Zé Welison 22'

Neo Química Arena, São Paulo
Attendance: 42,196
Referee: Esteban Ostojich (Uruguay)
3 October 2023
21:30 UTC−3

Fortaleza (Brazil)	2–0	(Brazil) Corinthians
Yago Pikachu 49'; Tinga 55'	Report

Castelão, Fortaleza
Attendance: 60,151
Referee: Andrés Rojas (Colombia)

Fortaleza won 3–1 on aggregate and advanced to the final.

== Final ==
The final was played on 28 October 2023 at Estadio Domingo Burgueño in Maldonado.

28 October 2023
17:00 UTC−3

Fortaleza (Brazil)	1–1 (a.e.t.)	(Ecuador) LDU Quito
Lucero 48'	Report	Alzugaray 56'
Penalties
Thiago Galhardo (penalty scored); Yago Pikachu (penalty scored); Romero (penalty missed); Tinga (penalty scored); Pedro Augusto (penalty missed); Brítez (penalty missed)	3–4	(penalty missed) Guerrero; (penalty scored) Alzugaray; (penalty scored) Martínez; (penalty scored) Julio; (penalty missed) Alvarado; (penalty scored) Piovi

Estadio Domingo Burgueño, Maldonado
Attendance: 17,420
Referee: Jesús Valenzuela (Venezuela)
