= 2023 Copa Sudamericana final =

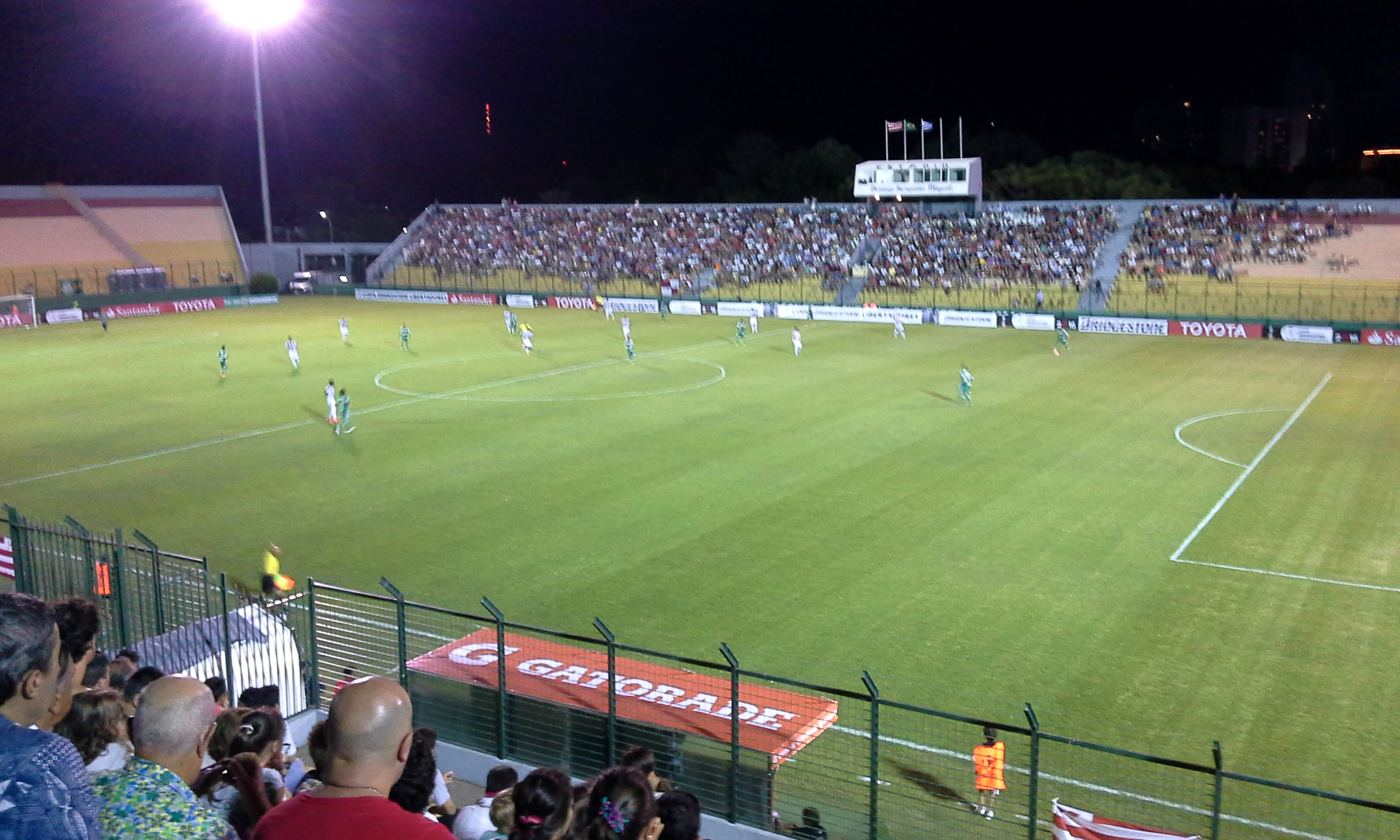
- The Estadio Domingo Burgueño in Maldonado hosted the final.
- Event: 2023 Copa Sudamericana
Fortaleza	LDU Quito
(Brazil)	(Ecuador)
1	1
- After extra time LDU Quito won 4–3 on penalties
- Date: 28 October 2023
- Venue: Estadio Domingo Burgueño, Maldonado
- Man of the Match: Alexander Domínguez (LDU Quito)
- Referee: Jesús Valenzuela (Venezuela)
- Attendance: 17,420

The 2023 Copa Sudamericana final was the final match which decided the winner of the 2023 Copa Sudamericana. This was the 22nd edition of the Copa Sudamericana, the second-tier South American continental club football tournament organized by CONMEBOL.

The match was played on 28 October 2023 between Brazilian club Fortaleza and Ecuadorian club LDU Quito; it was originally scheduled to be played at Estadio Centenario in Montevideo, Uruguay, but on 15 September 2023, Estadio Domingo Burgueño in Maldonado was confirmed as the venue for the final.

LDU Quito were crowned champions, winning their second title in the competition, after defeating Fortaleza 4–3 on penalties following a 1–1 draw after extra time. As winners of the 2023 Copa Sudamericana, LDU Quito earned the right to play against the winners of the 2023 Copa Libertadores in the 2024 Recopa Sudamericana. They also automatically qualified for the 2024 Copa Libertadores group stage.

== Venue ==
=== Original host selection ===
Although in January 2023 CONMEBOL president Alejandro Domínguez had expressed an intention to hold the final match at Estádio Nacional Mané Garrincha in Brasília in compensation for the 2022 final that could not be played at that stadium as originally planned due to the 2022 Brazilian general election, Estadio Centenario in Montevideo, Uruguay was selected as the host for the 2023 final by CONMEBOL during their meeting on 25 April 2023. The stadium had previously hosted the 2021 finals of both the Copa Libertadores and Copa Sudamericana, with the latter sparking criticism due to the poor attendance as less than a third of the stadium's capacity was filled by the fans.

=== Relocation to Maldonado ===
On 15 September 2023, the CONMEBOL president announced a relocation of the final to the Estadio Domingo Burgueño in Maldonado, Uruguay. A request from the Brazilian Football Confederation (CBF) to not hold the match in Montevideo on safety grounds as well as an attempt to avoid the low attendance levels of previous finals were considered to be the reasons behind the move.

== Teams ==
Team	Previous finals appearances (bold indicates winners)
(Brazil) Fortaleza	None
(Ecuador) LDU Quito	2 (**2009**, 2011)

== Road to the final ==
Note: In all scores below, the score of the home team is given first.

(Brazil) Fortaleza			Round	(Ecuador) LDU Quito		
Opponent	Venue	Score		Opponent	Venue	Score
Bye			First stage	(Ecuador) Delfín	Home	4–0
**Group H**			Group stage	**Group A**		
(Chile) Palestino	Home	4–0	Group stage	(Peru) Universidad César Vallejo	Away	1–2
(Argentina) San Lorenzo	Away	0–2	Group stage	(Chile) Magallanes	Home	4–0
(Venezuela) Estudiantes de Mérida	Home	6–1	Group stage	(Brazil) Botafogo	Away	0–0
(Argentina) San Lorenzo	Home	3–2	Group stage	(Chile) Magallanes	Away	1–1
(Venezuela) Estudiantes de Mérida	Away	1–0	Group stage	(Brazil) Botafogo	Home	0–0
(Chile) Palestino	Away	1–2	Group stage	(Peru) Universidad César Vallejo	Home	3–0
Pos / Team / Pld / Pts; **1** / (Brazil) Fortaleza / **6** / **15**; 2 / (Argentina) San Lorenzo / 6 / **8**; 3 / (Chile) Palestino / 6 / **8**; 4 / (Venezuela) Estudiantes de Mérida / 6 / **3**; Source: CONMEBOL			Group stage	Pos / Team / Pld / Pts; **1** / (Ecuador) LDU Quito / **6** / **12**; 2 / (Brazil) Botafogo / 6 / **10**; 3 / (Chile) Magallanes / 6 / **4**; 4 / (Peru) Universidad César Vallejo / 6 / **4**; Source: CONMEBOL		
**Seed 3**			Final stages	**Seed 6**		
Bye			Knockout round play-offs	Bye		
(Paraguay) Libertad (won 2–1 on aggregate)	Away	0–1	Round of 16	(Chile) Ñublense (tied 3–3 on aggregate, won on penalties)	Away	0–1
(Paraguay) Libertad (won 2–1 on aggregate)	Home	1–1	Round of 16	(Chile) Ñublense (tied 3–3 on aggregate, won on penalties)	Home	2–3 (4–3 p)
(Brazil) América Mineiro (won 5–2 on aggregate)	Away	1–3	Quarter-finals	(Brazil) São Paulo (tied 2–2 on aggregate, won on penalties)	Home	2–1
(Brazil) América Mineiro (won 5–2 on aggregate)	Home	2–1	Quarter-finals	(Brazil) São Paulo (tied 2–2 on aggregate, won on penalties)	Away	1–0 (4–5 p)
(Brazil) Corinthians (won 3–1 on aggregate)	Away	1–1	Semi-finals	(Argentina) Defensa y Justicia (won 3–0 on aggregate)	Home	3–0
(Brazil) Corinthians (won 3–1 on aggregate)	Home	2–0	Semi-finals	(Argentina) Defensa y Justicia (won 3–0 on aggregate)	Away	0–0

== Match ==
=== Details ===
28 October 2023
17:00 UTC−3

Fortaleza (Brazil)	1–1 (a.e.t.)	(Ecuador) LDU Quito
Lucero 48'	Report	Alzugaray 56'
Penalties
Thiago Galhardo (penalty scored); Yago Pikachu (penalty scored); Romero (penalty missed); Tinga (penalty scored); Pedro Augusto (penalty missed); Brítez (penalty missed)	3–4	(penalty missed) Guerrero; (penalty scored) Alzugaray; (penalty scored) Martínez; (penalty scored) Julio; (penalty missed) Alvarado; (penalty scored) Piovi

Estadio Domingo Burgueño, Maldonado
Attendance: 17,420
Referee: Jesús Valenzuela (Venezuela)

**Fortaleza**	**LDU Quito**

GK	1	(Brazil) João Ricardo
RB	2	(Brazil) Tinga (c)
RCB	19	(Argentina) Emanuel Brítez	(yellow card) 81'
LCB	4	(Brazil) Titi
LB	6	(Brazil) Bruno Pacheco
RDM	17	(Brazil) Zé Welison		(substituted off) 84'
LDM	8	(Brazil) Caio Alexandre	(yellow card) 18'	(substituted off) 106'
AM	7	(Argentina) Tomás Pochettino		(substituted off) 83'
RW	12	(Brazil) Marinho	(yellow card) 52'	(substituted off) 74'
LW	29	(Brazil) Guilherme	(yellow card) 41'	(substituted off) 65'
CF	9	(Argentina) Juan Martín Lucero		(substituted off) 100'
Substitutes:
GK	16	(Brazil) Fernando Miguel
DF	3	(Portugal) Tobias Figueiredo
DF	5	(Brazil) Marcelo Benevenuto
DF	22	(Brazil) Yago Pikachu		(substituted on) 65'
DF	45	(Argentina) Gonzalo Escobar
MF	10	(Brazil) Lucas Crispim
MF	21	(Brazil) Pedro Augusto		(substituted on) 84'
MF	39	(Argentina) Imanol Machuca		(substituted on) 74'
MF	88	(Brazil) Lucas Sasha		(substituted on) 106'
FW	18	(Argentina) Silvio Romero		(substituted on) 100'
FW	32	(Brazil) Pedro Rocha
FW	91	(Brazil) Thiago Galhardo		(substituted on) 83'
Manager:
(Argentina) Juan Pablo Vojvoda

GK	22	(Ecuador) Alexander Domínguez
RB	14	(Ecuador) José Quintero
RCB	4	(Haiti) Ricardo Adé
LCB	6	(Argentina) Facundo Rodríguez
LB	33	(Ecuador) Leonel Quiñónez		(substituted off) 97'
RDM	16	(Argentina) Mauricio Martínez
LDM	18	(Argentina) Lucas Piovi (c)	(yellow card) 98'
AM	21	(Ecuador) Sebastián González		(substituted off) 63'
RW	32	(Ecuador) Renato Ibarra		(substituted off) 39'
LW	26	(Ecuador) Jhojan Julio
CF	24	(Peru) Paolo Guerrero	(yellow card) 35'
Substitutes:
GK	23	(Argentina) Adrián Gabbarini
DF	3	(Ecuador) Richard Mina
DF	13	(Ecuador) Daykol Romero
DF	29	(Ecuador) Bryan Ramírez		(substituted on) 97'
MF	5	(Ecuador) Óscar Zambrano
MF	10	(Ecuador) Alexander Alvarado		(substituted on) 63'
MF	25	(Ecuador) Jefferson Valverde
MF	30	(Ecuador) Danny Luna
FW	9	(Argentina) Lisandro Alzugaray		(substituted on) 39'
FW	11	(Ecuador) Walter Chalá
FW	19	(Ecuador) José Angulo
FW	27	(Venezuela) Jan Carlos Hurtado
Manager:
(Argentina) Luis Zubeldía

Man of the Match:
Alexander Domínguez (LDU Quito)

Assistant referees:
Jorge Urrego (Venezuela)
Tulio Moreno (Venezuela)
Fourth official:
Ángel Arteaga (Venezuela)
Fifth official:
Carlos López (Venezuela)
Video assistant referee:
Jorge Baliño (Argentina)
Assistant video assistant referees:
Héctor Paletta (Argentina)
Ezequiel Brailovsky (Argentina)
Silvio Trucco (Argentina)

**Match rules**

- 90 minutes.
- 30 minutes of extra time if necessary.
- Penalty shoot-out if scores still level.
- Twelve named substitutes.
- Maximum of five substitutions, with a sixth allowed in extra time.

== Broadcasting ==
The following is the list of official broadcasters in their respective countries.

Nation	Broadcaster
Argentina	DSports/DGO; ESPN/Star+
Bolivia	Tigo Sports; ESPN/Star+
Brazil	SBT; ESPN/Star+
Chile	DSports/DGO; ESPN/Star+
Colombia	DSports/DGO; ESPN/Star+
Ecuador	DSports/DGO; ESPN/Star+
Paraguay	Tigo Sports; ESPN/Star+
Peru	DSports/DGO; ESPN/Star+
Uruguay	DSports/DGO; ESPN/Star+
Venezuela	DSports/DGO; ESPN/Star+

== See also ==
- 2023 Copa Libertadores final
- 2024 Recopa Sudamericana
