= 2023 Copa Sudamericana group stage =

Football results

The 2023 Copa Sudamericana group stage was played from 4 April to 29 June 2023. A total of 32 teams competed in the group stage to decide 16 of the 24 places in the final stages of the 2023 Copa Sudamericana.

== Draw ==
The draw for the group stage was held on 27 March 2023, 20:00 PYT (UTC−4), at the CONMEBOL Convention Centre in Luque, Paraguay.

Teams were seeded by their CONMEBOL Clubs ranking as of 9 December 2022 (shown in parentheses), taking into account the following three factors:

1. Performance in the last 10 years, taking into account Copa Libertadores and Copa Sudamericana results in the period 2013–2022.
2. Historical coefficient, taking into account Copa Libertadores and Copa Sudamericana results in the period 1960–2012 and 2002–2012 respectively.
3. Local tournament champion, with bonus points awarded to domestic league champions of the last 10 years.

For the group stage, the 32 teams were drawn into eight groups (Groups A–H) of four containing a team from each of the four pots. The four losers of the Copa Libertadores third stage were seeded into Pot 4. Teams from the same association could not be drawn into the same group.

Group stage draw
Pot 1	Pot 2	Pot 3	Pot 4
(Uruguay) Peñarol (8); (Brazil) São Paulo (9); (Brazil) Santos (10); (Ecuador) LDU Quito (21); (Argentina) Estudiantes (23); (Ecuador) Emelec (29); (Argentina) San Lorenzo (31); (Colombia) Santa Fe (34)	(Argentina) Defensa y Justicia (37); (Paraguay) Guaraní (41); (Brazil) Red Bull Bragantino (45); (Peru) Universitario (46); (Colombia) Deportes Tolima (47); (Brazil) Botafogo (59); (Argentina) Newell's Old Boys (61); (Chile) Palestino (67)	(Bolivia) Oriente Petrolero (81); (Venezuela) Estudiantes de Mérida (96); (Uruguay) Danubio (103); (Argentina) Tigre (108); (Brazil) América Mineiro (118); (Bolivia) Blooming (121); (Brazil) Goiás (136); (Peru) Universidad César Vallejo (149)	(Chile) Audax Italiano (153); (Argentina) Gimnasia y Esgrima (162); (Venezuela) Academia Puerto Cabello (232); (Paraguay) Tacuary (No rank); (Colombia) Millonarios (57); (Argentina) Huracán (58); (Brazil) Fortaleza (78); (Chile) Magallanes (215)

Notes

1. ^{CLQ3} The Copa Libertadores third stage losers were seeded in Pot 4.

The following are the four losers of the third stage of the 2023 Copa Libertadores qualifying stages which joined the 12 direct entrants and the 16 Copa Sudamericana first stage winners in the group stage.

Match	Third stage losers
G1	(Colombia) Millonarios
G2	(Argentina) Huracán
G3	(Brazil) Fortaleza
G4	(Chile) Magallanes

== Format ==
In the group stage, each group was played on a home-and-away round-robin basis. The teams were ranked according to the following criteria: 1. Points (3 points for a win, 1 point for a draw, and 0 points for a loss); 2. Goal difference; 3. Goals scored; 4. Away goals scored; 5. CONMEBOL ranking (Regulations Article 2.4.2).

The winners of each group advanced to the round of 16 of the final stages, whilst the runners-up of each group advanced to the knockout round play-offs of the final stages.

== Schedule ==
The schedule of each matchday was as follows (Regulations Article 2.2.2).

Matchday	Dates	Matches
Matchday 1	4–6 April 2023	Team 4 vs. Team 2, Team 3 vs. Team 1
Matchday 2	18–20 April 2023	Team 2 vs. Team 3, Team 1 vs. Team 4
Matchday 3	2–4 May 2023	Team 2 vs. Team 1, Team 4 vs. Team 3
Matchday 4	23–25 May 2023	Team 3 vs. Team 2, Team 4 vs. Team 1
Matchday 5	6–8 June 2023	Team 1 vs. Team 2, Team 3 vs. Team 4
Matchday 6	27–29 June 2023	Team 1 vs. Team 3, Team 2 vs. Team 4

== Groups ==
=== Group A ===
Pos	Team	Pld	W	D	L	GF	GA	GD	Pts	Qualification	LDQ	BOT	MAG	UCV
1	(Ecuador) LDU Quito	6	3	3	0	10	2	+8	12	Advance to round of 16	—	0–0	4–0	3–0
2	(Brazil) Botafogo	6	2	4	0	10	5	+5	10	Advance to knockout round play-offs	0–0	—	1–1	4–0
3	(Chile) Magallanes	6	0	4	2	8	13	−5	4		1–1	2–2	—	2–2
4	(Peru) Universidad César Vallejo	6	1	1	4	8	16	−8	4		1–2	2–3	3–2	—

Source: CONMEBOL
4 April 2023
19:00 UTC−5

Universidad César Vallejo (Peru)	1–2	(Ecuador) LDU Quito
Vélez 70' (pen.)	Report	Alzugaray 52'; Anangonó 90+6'

Estadio Mansiche, Trujillo
Attendance: 2,912
Referee: Fernando Espinoza (Argentina)
6 April 2023
20:00 UTC−4

Magallanes (Chile)	2–2	(Brazil) Botafogo
Canales 16'; Contreras 75'	Report	Tiquinho Soares 6'; Carlos Eduardo 58'

Estadio El Teniente, Rancagua (Note: Magallanes played their home matches at Estadio El Teniente, Rancagua instead of their regular stadium Estadio Municipal Luis Navarro Avilés, Santiago which did not meet CONMEBOL requirements.)
Referee: Cristian Ferreyra (Uruguay)

19 April 2023
21:00 UTC−5

LDU Quito (Ecuador)	4–0	(Chile) Magallanes
Angulo 53', 55'; Martínez 86'; Piñero 89' (o.g.)	Report

Estadio Rodrigo Paz Delgado, Quito
Attendance: 6,937
Referee: José Argote (Venezuela)
20 April 2023
21:00 UTC−3

Botafogo (Brazil)	4–0	(Peru) Universidad César Vallejo
Victor Sá 14'; Tiquinho Soares 45+3' (pen.); Carlos Eduardo 57'; Tchê Tchê 73' (pen.)	Report

Estádio Olímpico Nilton Santos, Rio de Janeiro
Attendance: 19,486
Referee: Maximiliano Ramírez (Argentina)

2 May 2023
20:00 UTC−4

Magallanes (Chile)	2–2	(Peru) Universidad César Vallejo
Berardo 23'; Santibáñez 33' (o.g.)	Report	Ysique 19'; Mena 56'

Estadio El Teniente, Rancagua
Attendance: 647
Referee: Fernando Rapallini (Argentina)
4 May 2023
21:00 UTC−3

Botafogo (Brazil)	0–0	(Ecuador) LDU Quito
	Report

Estádio Olímpico Nilton Santos, Rio de Janeiro
Referee: Darío Herrera (Argentina)

23 May 2023
20:00 UTC−4

Magallanes (Chile)	1–1	(Ecuador) LDU Quito
Flores 45+8'	Report	Rodríguez 45+2'

Estadio El Teniente, Rancagua
Referee: Maximiliano Ramírez (Argentina)
25 May 2023
19:00 UTC−5 (Note: The Universidad César Vallejo v Botafogo match, originally scheduled for 25 May 2023, 21:00 local time, was re-scheduled to 19:00 local time.)

Universidad César Vallejo (Peru)	2–3	(Brazil) Botafogo
Mena 65'; Noronha 78'	Report	Victor Sá 21'; Adryelson 31'; Gustavo Sauer 37'

Estadio Mansiche, Trujillo
Referee: Facundo Tello (Argentina)

6 June 2023
21:00 UTC−5

LDU Quito (Ecuador)	0–0	(Brazil) Botafogo
	Report

Estadio Rodrigo Paz Delgado, Quito
Attendance: 11,212
Referee: José Argote (Venezuela)
8 June 2023
21:00 UTC−5

Universidad César Vallejo (Peru)	3–2	(Chile) Magallanes
Fuentes 3'; Vélez 35'; Mena 80'	Report	Villanueva 42'; Zapata 89' (pen.)

Estadio Mansiche, Trujillo
Attendance: 385
Referee: Leandro Rey Hilfer (Argentina)

29 June 2023
19:00 UTC−5

LDU Quito (Ecuador)	3–0	(Peru) Universidad César Vallejo
Julio 29'; Alvarado 76'; Alzugaray 88'	Report

Estadio Rodrigo Paz Delgado, Quito
Referee: Andrés Merlos (Argentina)
29 June 2023
21:00 UTC−3

Botafogo (Brazil)	1–1	(Chile) Magallanes
Freitas 19'	Report	Zapata 80'

Estádio Olímpico Nilton Santos, Rio de Janeiro
Attendance: 27,504
Referee: Bismark Santiago (Colombia)

=== Group B ===
Pos	Team	Pld	W	D	L	GF	GA	GD	Pts	Qualification	GUA	EME	DAN	HUR
1	(Paraguay) Guaraní	6	3	2	1	9	7	+2	11	Advance to round of 16	—	1–1	2–1	2–0
2	(Ecuador) Emelec	6	2	3	1	7	7	0	9	Advance to knockout round play-offs	1–1	—	2–1	1–0
3	(Uruguay) Danubio	6	2	1	3	6	7	−1	7		0–2	2–0	—	1–0
4	(Argentina) Huracán	6	1	2	3	7	8	−1	5		4–1	2–2	1–1	—

Source: CONMEBOL
5 April 2023
19:00 UTC−3

Danubio (Uruguay)	2–0	(Ecuador) Emelec
Millán 5'; May 90'	Report

Estadio Centenario, Montevideo (Note: Danubio played their home matches at Estadio Centenario, Montevideo instead of their regular stadium Estadio Jardines del Hipódromo, Montevideo which did not meet CONMEBOL requirements.)
Attendance: 1,968
Referee: Jhon Ospina (Colombia)
6 April 2023
19:00 UTC−3

Huracán (Argentina)	4–1	(Paraguay) Guaraní
Hezze 14'; Castro 35'; Luján 84'; Garro 90'	Report	Santander 18'

Estadio Tomás Adolfo Ducó, Buenos Aires
Attendance: 5,523
Referee: Kevin Ortega (Peru)

19 April 2023
18:00 UTC−4

Guaraní (Paraguay)	2–1	(Uruguay) Danubio
Santander 68' (pen.); Barceló 76'	Report	May 42'

Estadio Manuel Ferreira, Asunción (Note: Guaraní played their home matches at Estadio Manuel Ferreira, Asunción instead of the originally scheduled Estadio Defensores del Chaco, Asunción.)
Attendance: 912
Referee: Flavio de Souza (Brazil)
20 April 2023
21:00 UTC−5

Emelec (Ecuador)	1–0	(Argentina) Huracán
Fara 17'	Report

Estadio George Capwell, Guayaquil
Referee: Bruno Arleu (Brazil)

2 May 2023
19:00 UTC−3

Huracán (Argentina)	1–1	(Uruguay) Danubio
Novillo 69'	Report	Haller 24'

Estadio Tomás Adolfo Ducó, Buenos Aires
Attendance: 5,516
Referee: Bráulio Machado (Brazil)
3 May 2023
20:00 UTC−4

Guaraní (Paraguay)	1–1	(Ecuador) Emelec
Santander 63'	Report	Cabeza 83'

Estadio Manuel Ferreira, Asunción
Attendance: 877
Referee: Wilton Sampaio (Brazil)

25 May 2023
19:00 UTC−3

Danubio (Uruguay)	0–2	(Paraguay) Guaraní
	Report	Santander 74' (pen.); Cantero 80'

Estadio Centenario, Montevideo
Attendance: 1,445
Referee: Raphael Claus (Brazil)
25 May 2023
21:00 UTC−3

Huracán (Argentina)	2–2	(Ecuador) Emelec
Hezze 6'; Acevedo 60'	Report	Cabeza 18'; Bolaños 86'

Estadio Tomás Adolfo Ducó, Buenos Aires
Referee: Andrés Rojas (Colombia)

7 June 2023
21:00 UTC−5

Emelec (Ecuador)	1–1	(Paraguay) Guaraní
García 13'	Report	Benítez 39'

Estadio George Capwell, Guayaquil
Referee: Flavio de Souza (Brazil)
8 June 2023
19:00 UTC−3

Danubio (Uruguay)	1–0	(Argentina) Huracán
May 84' (pen.)	Report

Estadio Centenario, Montevideo
Attendance: 1,714
Referee: Carlos Ortega (Colombia)

28 June 2023
19:00 UTC−5

Emelec (Ecuador)	2–1	(Uruguay) Danubio
Carabalí 36'; Lastre 64'	Report	Vera 68'

Estadio George Capwell, Guayaquil
Referee: Bráulio Machado (Brazil)
28 June 2023
20:00 UTC−4

Guaraní (Paraguay)	2–0	(Argentina) Huracán
Santander 29' (pen.); Camacho 43' (pen.)	Report

Estadio Manuel Ferreira, Asunción
Attendance: 1,360
Referee: Bruno Arleu (Brazil)

=== Group C ===
Pos	Team	Pld	W	D	L	GF	GA	GD	Pts	Qualification	RBB	EST	TAC	ORI
1	(Brazil) Red Bull Bragantino	6	4	2	0	21	3	+18	14	Advance to round of 16	—	0–0	7–1	5–0
2	(Argentina) Estudiantes	6	4	2	0	14	1	+13	14	Advance to knockout round play-offs	1–1	—	4–0	4–0
3	(Paraguay) Tacuary	6	2	0	4	8	21	−13	6		1–4	0–4	—	3–1
4	(Bolivia) Oriente Petrolero	6	0	0	6	2	20	−18	0		0–4	0–1	1–3	—

Source: CONMEBOL
5 April 2023
18:00 UTC−4

Oriente Petrolero (Bolivia)	0–1	(Argentina) Estudiantes
	Report	Godoy 63'

Estadio Ramón Tahuichi Aguilera, Santa Cruz de la Sierra
Attendance: 12,881
Referee: Franklin Congo (Ecuador)
6 April 2023
20:00 UTC−4

Tacuary (Paraguay)	1–4	(Brazil) Red Bull Bragantino
Edson Cariús 22'	Report	Juninho Capixaba 39'; Alerrandro 49'; Talisson 62'; Gustavinho 77'

Estadio Defensores del Chaco, Asunción (Note: Tacuary played their home matches at Estadio Defensores del Chaco, Asunción instead of their regular stadium Estadio Toribio Vargas, Asunción which did not meet CONMEBOL requirements.)
Referee: Mathías de Armas (Uruguay)

18 April 2023
19:00 UTC−3

Red Bull Bragantino (Brazil)	5–0	(Bolivia) Oriente Petrolero
Helinho 5'; Aderlan 15'; Eduardo Sasha 33' (pen.); Gustavinho 62'; Sorriso 90+6'	Report

Estádio Nabi Abi Chedid, Bragança Paulista
Attendance: 2,892
Referee: Francisco Gilabert (Chile)
18 April 2023
21:00 UTC−3

Estudiantes (Argentina)	4–0	(Paraguay) Tacuary
Piatti 63'; Núñez 71'; Mancuso 81'; Carrillo 90+4'	Report

Estadio Jorge Luis Hirschi, La Plata
Attendance: 17,287
Referee: Piero Maza (Chile)

2 May 2023
18:00 UTC−4

Tacuary (Paraguay)	3–1	(Bolivia) Oriente Petrolero
Edson Cariús 14', 52'; Alfonso 57'	Report	Álvarez 29' (pen.)

Estadio Defensores del Chaco, Asunción
Referee: Fernando Véjar (Chile)
2 May 2023
21:00 UTC−3

Red Bull Bragantino (Brazil)	0–0	(Argentina) Estudiantes
	Report

Estádio Nabi Abi Chedid, Bragança Paulista
Attendance: 3,236
Referee: Carlos Ortega (Colombia)

25 May 2023
18:00 UTC−4

Tacuary (Paraguay)	0–4	(Argentina) Estudiantes
	Report	Godoy 56'; Boselli 59', 77'; Bareiro 75' (o.g.)

Estadio Defensores del Chaco, Asunción
Attendance: 1,209
Referee: José Argote (Venezuela)
25 May 2023
20:00 UTC−4

Oriente Petrolero (Bolivia)	0–4	(Brazil) Red Bull Bragantino
	Report	Eduardo Sasha 21'; Bruninho 30'; Lucas Evangelista 78'; Borbas 82'

Estadio Ramón Tahuichi Aguilera, Santa Cruz de la Sierra
Referee: Bismark Santiago (Colombia)

7 June 2023
21:00 UTC−3

Estudiantes (Argentina)	1–1	(Brazil) Red Bull Bragantino
Rollheiser 66' (pen.)	Report	Ramires 45+1'

Estadio Jorge Luis Hirschi, La Plata
Referee: Kevin Ortega (Peru)
8 June 2023
18:00 UTC−4

Oriente Petrolero (Bolivia)	1–3	(Paraguay) Tacuary
Rojas 87'	Report	Valdeci 30'; Núñez 43'; Villalba 78' (o.g.)

Estadio Ramón Tahuichi Aguilera, Santa Cruz de la Sierra
Attendance: 6,894
Referee: Javier Feres (Uruguay)

28 June 2023
19:00 UTC−3

Estudiantes (Argentina)	4–0	(Bolivia) Oriente Petrolero
Boselli 29'; Carrillo 30'; Rollheiser 62'; Mancuso 90+5'	Report

Estadio Jorge Luis Hirschi, La Plata
Attendance: 16,514
Referee: Manuel Vergara (Chile)
28 June 2023
19:00 UTC−3

Red Bull Bragantino (Brazil)	7–1	(Paraguay) Tacuary
Sorriso 6', 29'; Lucas Evangelista 19'; Eduardo Sasha 21', 48', 49'; Borbas 87'	Report	Ruiz 39'

Estádio Nabi Abi Chedid, Bragança Paulista
Attendance: 4,115
Referee: Fernando Véjar (Chile)

=== Group D ===
Pos	Team	Pld	W	D	L	GF	GA	GD	Pts	Qualification	SPA	TIG	TOL	APC
1	(Brazil) São Paulo	6	5	1	0	13	0	+13	16	Advance to round of 16	—	2–0	5–0	2–0
2	(Argentina) Tigre	6	3	1	2	7	6	+1	10	Advance to knockout round play-offs	0–2	—	0–0	2–1
3	(Colombia) Deportes Tolima	6	2	2	2	6	8	−2	8		0–0	1–2	—	3–1
4	(Venezuela) Academia Puerto Cabello	6	0	0	6	2	14	−12	0		0–2	0–3	0–2	—

Source: CONMEBOL
6 April 2023
20:00 UTC−4

Academia Puerto Cabello (Venezuela)	0–2	(Colombia) Deportes Tolima
	Report	Herazo 45+5'; Guzmán 56' (pen.)

Estadio Misael Delgado, Valencia (Note: Academia Puerto Cabello played their home matches at Estadio Misael Delgado, Valencia instead of their regular stadium Estadio La Bombonerita, Puerto Cabello which did not meet CONMEBOL requirements.)
Attendance: 4,908
Referee: Michael Espinoza (Peru)
6 April 2023
21:00 UTC−3

Tigre (Argentina)	0–2	(Brazil) São Paulo
	Report	Erison 57', 74'

Estadio José Dellagiovanna, Victoria
Referee: Esteban Ostojich (Uruguay)

18 April 2023
21:30 UTC−3

São Paulo (Brazil)	2–0	(Venezuela) Academia Puerto Cabello
Marcos Paulo 86'; Araújo 88'	Report

Estádio do Morumbi, São Paulo
Attendance: 16,827
Referee: Ivo Méndez (Bolivia)
20 April 2023
21:00 UTC−5

Deportes Tolima (Colombia)	1–2	(Argentina) Tigre
Boné 59'	Report	Colidio 66'; Badaloni 78'

Estadio Manuel Murillo Toro, Ibagué
Referee: Luis Quiroz (Ecuador)

2 May 2023
17:00 UTC−5

Deportes Tolima (Colombia)	0–0	(Brazil) São Paulo
	Report

Estadio Manuel Murillo Toro, Ibagué
Referee: Felipe González (Chile)
3 May 2023
20:00 UTC−4

Academia Puerto Cabello (Venezuela)	0–3	(Argentina) Tigre
	Report	Retegui 24' (pen.); Menossi 68'; Blondel 81'

Estadio Misael Delgado, Valencia
Attendance: 3,650
Referee: Augusto Aragón (Ecuador)

23 May 2023
20:30 UTC−4

Academia Puerto Cabello (Venezuela)	0–2	(Brazil) São Paulo
	Report	Wellington Rato 28'; Alisson 90+4'

Estadio Misael Delgado, Valencia
Attendance: 2,254
Referee: Bryan Loaiza (Ecuador)
24 May 2023
21:00 UTC−3

Tigre (Argentina)	0–0	(Colombia) Deportes Tolima
	Report

Estadio José Dellagiovanna, Victoria
Referee: Kevin Ortega (Peru)

6 June 2023
21:00 UTC−3

Tigre (Argentina)	2–1	(Venezuela) Academia Puerto Cabello
Luciatti 17'; Armoa 56'	Report	Pérez 90+6' (pen.)

Estadio José Dellagiovanna, Victoria
Attendance: 8,964
Referee: Augusto Aragón (Peru)
8 June 2023
19:00 UTC−3

São Paulo (Brazil)	5–0	(Colombia) Deportes Tolima
Calleri 28'; Luciano 35'; Caio Paulista 37', 61'; David 77'	Report

Estádio do Morumbi, São Paulo
Attendance: 44,102
Referee: Leodán González (Uruguay)

27 June 2023
21:30 UTC−3

São Paulo (Brazil)	2–0	(Argentina) Tigre
Juan 72'; Wellington Rato 90+3'	Report

Estádio do Morumbi, São Paulo
Attendance: 28,699
Referee: Guillermo Guerrero (Ecuador)
27 June 2023
19:30 UTC−5

Deportes Tolima (Colombia)	3–1	(Venezuela) Academia Puerto Cabello
Guzmán 5'; Boné 27'; Herazo 43'	Report	Figueroa 45+1'

Estadio Manuel Murillo Toro, Ibagué
Referee: Joel Alarcón (Peru)

=== Group E ===
Pos	Team	Pld	W	D	L	GF	GA	GD	Pts	Qualification	NOB	AUD	SAN	BLO
1	(Argentina) Newell's Old Boys	6	5	1	0	11	4	+7	16	Advance to round of 16	—	1–1	1–0	3–0
2	(Chile) Audax Italiano	6	3	2	1	7	4	+3	11	Advance to knockout round play-offs	0–1	—	2–1	2–0
3	(Brazil) Santos	6	1	2	3	3	5	−2	5		1–2	0–0	—	0–0
4	(Bolivia) Blooming	6	0	1	5	3	11	−8	1		2–3	1–2	0–1	—

Source: CONMEBOL
4 April 2023
18:00 UTC−4

Audax Italiano (Chile)	0–1	(Argentina) Newell's Old Boys
	Report	Aguirre 90+4'

Estadio El Teniente, Rancagua (Note: Audax Italiano played their home matches at Estadio El Teniente, Rancagua instead of their regular stadium Estadio Bicentenario de La Florida, Santiago which did not meet CONMEBOL requirements.)
Referee: Gustavo Tejera (Uruguay)
4 April 2023
20:30 UTC−4

Blooming (Bolivia)	0–1	(Brazil) Santos
	Report	Bauermann 90+8'

Estadio Ramón Tahuichi Aguilera, Santa Cruz de la Sierra
Attendance: 13,709
Referee: Luis Quiroz (Ecuador)

18 April 2023
19:00 UTC−3

Newell's Old Boys (Argentina)	3–0	(Bolivia) Blooming
Portillo 27', 62'; Reasco 45'	Report

Estadio Marcelo Bielsa, Rosario
Attendance: 9,955
Referee: Jhon Hinestroza (Colombia)
20 April 2023
19:00 UTC−3

Santos (Brazil)	0–0	(Chile) Audax Italiano
	Report

Estádio Urbano Caldeira, Santos
Attendance: 8,866
Referee: Andrés Rojas (Colombia)

2 May 2023
21:30 UTC−3

Newell's Old Boys (Argentina)	1–0	(Brazil) Santos
Gómez 84'	Report

Estadio Marcelo Bielsa, Rosario
Attendance: 10,327
Referee: Alexis Herrera (Venezuela)
4 May 2023
20:00 UTC−4

Audax Italiano (Chile)	2–0	(Bolivia) Blooming
Sosa 45'; Ríos 66'	Report

Estadio El Teniente, Rancagua
Referee: Diego Haro (Peru)

24 May 2023
20:00 UTC−4

Audax Italiano (Chile)	2–1	(Brazil) Santos
Sosa 45+5', 55'	Report	Camacho 20'

Estadio El Teniente, Rancagua
Referee: Christian Ferreyra (Uruguay)
24 May 2023
22:00 UTC−4

Blooming (Bolivia)	2–3	(Argentina) Newell's Old Boys
Rafinha 12'; Fenga 88'	Report	Gómez 36'; Latorre 58' (o.g.); Recalde 67'

Estadio Ramón Tahuichi Aguilera, Santa Cruz de la Sierra
Attendance: 2,475
Referee: Carlos Betancur (Colombia)

6 June 2023
21:30 UTC−3

Santos (Brazil)	1–2	(Argentina) Newell's Old Boys
Marcos Leonardo 80' (pen.)	Report	Sforza 45+1'; Portillo 90+8'

Estádio Urbano Caldeira, Santos
Attendance: 6,204
Referee: Jesús Valenzuela (Venezuela)
7 June 2023
20:00 UTC−4

Blooming (Bolivia)	1–2	(Chile) Audax Italiano
Sinisterra 30'	Report	Sepúlveda 12', 38'

Estadio Ramón Tahuichi Aguilera, Santa Cruz de la Sierra
Attendance: 2,155
Referee: Juan Andrade (Ecuador)

29 June 2023
19:00 UTC−3

Santos (Brazil)	0–0	(Bolivia) Blooming
	Report

Estádio Urbano Caldeira, Santos
Attendance: 2,891
Referee: Augusto Aragón (Ecuador)
29 June 2023
19:00 UTC−3

Newell's Old Boys (Argentina)	1–1	(Chile) Audax Italiano
Méndez 90+7'	Report	Cereceda 6'

Estadio Marcelo Bielsa, Rosario
Referee: Jhon Ospina (Colombia)

=== Group F ===
Pos	Team	Pld	W	D	L	GF	GA	GD	Pts	Qualification	DYJ	AMG	MIL	PEÑ
1	(Argentina) Defensa y Justicia	6	5	0	1	15	8	+7	15	Advance to round of 16	—	2–1	3–1	4–1
2	(Brazil) América Mineiro	6	3	1	2	12	8	+4	10	Advance to knockout round play-offs	2–3	—	2–0	4–1
3	(Colombia) Millonarios	6	3	1	2	10	7	+3	10		3–0	1–1	—	3–1
4	(Uruguay) Peñarol	6	0	0	6	4	18	−14	0		0–3	1–2	0–2	—

Source: CONMEBOL
4 April 2023
21:00 UTC−5

Millonarios (Colombia)	3–0	(Argentina) Defensa y Justicia
Castro 59' (pen.), 69'; Silva 72'	Report

Estadio El Campín, Bogotá
Referee: Piero Maza (Chile)
5 April 2023
21:00 UTC−3

América Mineiro (Brazil)	4–1	(Uruguay) Peñarol
Éder 3'; Mastriani 6', 56'; Wellington Paulista 68'	Report	Mansilla 76'

Arena Independência, Belo Horizonte
Attendance: 4,424
Referee: Guillermo Guerrero (Ecuador)

19 April 2023
21:00 UTC−3

Defensa y Justicia (Argentina)	2–1	(Brazil) América Mineiro
López 49'; Soto 51'	Report	Lucas Kal 63'

Estadio Norberto Tomaghello, Gobernador Costa
Attendance: 5,926
Referee: Alexis Herrera (Venezuela)
20 April 2023
19:00 UTC−3

Peñarol (Uruguay)	0–2	(Colombia) Millonarios
	Report	Perlaza 54'; Cortés 65'

Estadio Campeón del Siglo, Montevideo
Attendance: 18,885
Referee: Cristian Garay (Chile)

3 May 2023
19:00 UTC−5

Millonarios (Colombia)	1–1	(Brazil) América Mineiro
Castro 16'	Report	Azevedo 45+2'

Estadio El Campín, Bogotá
Attendance: 25,877
Referee: Guillermo Guerrero (Ecuador)
4 May 2023
21:00 UTC−3

Defensa y Justicia (Argentina)	4–1	(Uruguay) Peñarol
Sant'Anna 39', 45+1'; Fernández 70'; Togni 80'	Report	S. Rodríguez 58'

Estadio Norberto Tomaghello, Gobernador Costa
Attendance: 7,354
Referee: José Argote (Venezuela)

23 May 2023
21:00 UTC−3

América Mineiro (Brazil)	2–3	(Argentina) Defensa y Justicia
Benítez 11'; Mastriani 45'	Report	Togni 29', 46'; López 69'

Arena Independência, Belo Horizonte
Attendance: 1,967
Referee: Ivo Méndez (Bolivia)
23 May 2023
21:00 UTC−5

Millonarios (Colombia)	3–1	(Uruguay) Peñarol
Arias 9'; Menosse 23' (o.g.); Paredes 29'	Report	Arezo 49' (pen.)

Estadio El Campín, Bogotá
Referee: Alexis Herrera (Venezuela)

6 June 2023
19:00 UTC−3

Peñarol (Uruguay)	0–3	(Argentina) Defensa y Justicia
	Report	Togni 42'; Fernández 50'; Solari 87'

Estadio Campeón del Siglo, Montevideo
Attendance: 5,162
Referee: Francisco Gilabert (Chile)
6 June 2023
21:00 UTC−3

América Mineiro (Brazil)	2–0	(Colombia) Millonarios
Aloísio 40'; Breno 70'	Report

Arena Independência, Belo Horizonte
Attendance: 2,325
Referee: Guillermo Guerrero (Ecuador)

29 June 2023
21:00 UTC−3

Peñarol (Uruguay)	1–2	(Brazil) América Mineiro
S. Rodríguez 28'	Report	Avelar 78'; Juninho 88'

Estadio Centenario, Montevideo (Note: Peñarol played their home match against América Mineiro at Estadio Centenario, Montevideo instead of their regular stadium Estadio Campeón del Siglo, Montevideo due to a change in the stadium's lighting system.)
Attendance: 4,658
Referee: Diego Haro (Peru)
29 June 2023
21:00 UTC−3

Defensa y Justicia (Argentina)	3–1	(Colombia) Millonarios
Fernández 3', 13', 60'	Report	Cataño 18'

Estadio Norberto Tomaghello, Gobernador Costa
Attendance: 5,324
Referee: Cristian Garay (Chile)

=== Group G ===
Pos	Team	Pld	W	D	L	GF	GA	GD	Pts	Qualification	GOI	UNI	SFE	GLP
1	(Brazil) Goiás	6	3	3	0	7	3	+4	12	Advance to round of 16	—	1–0	0–0	0–0
2	(Peru) Universitario	6	3	1	2	6	5	+1	10	Advance to knockout round play-offs	2–2	—	2–0	1–0
3	(Colombia) Santa Fe	6	2	1	3	5	6	−1	7		1–2	2–0	—	2–1
4	(Argentina) Gimnasia y Esgrima	6	1	1	4	2	6	−4	4		0–2	0–1	1–0	—

Source: CONMEBOL
4 April 2023
19:00 UTC−3

Goiás (Brazil)	0–0	(Colombia) Santa Fe
	Report

Estádio da Serrinha, Goiânia
Referee: José Cabero (Chile)
5 April 2023
21:00 UTC−3

Gimnasia y Esgrima (Argentina)	0–1	(Peru) Universitario
	Report	Succar 85' (pen.)

Estadio Juan Carmelo Zerillo, La Plata
Attendance: 13,193
Referee: Andrés Matonte (Uruguay)

18 April 2023
21:00 UTC−5

Santa Fe (Colombia)	2–1	(Argentina) Gimnasia y Esgrima
Mantilla 57'; Rodallega 90+6'	Report	Lescano 41'

Estadio El Campín, Bogotá
Referee: Guillermo Guerrero (Ecuador)
20 April 2023
21:00 UTC−5

Universitario (Peru)	2–2	(Brazil) Goiás
Riveros 87'; Valera 90+6'	Report	Morelli 57'; Maguinho 65'

Estadio Monumental, Lima
Attendance: 47,132
Referee: Gery Vargas (Bolivia)

4 May 2023
19:00 UTC−3

Gimnasia y Esgrima (Argentina)	0–2	(Brazil) Goiás
	Report	Vinícius 55' (pen.); Matheus Peixoto 82' (pen.)

Estadio Juan Carmelo Zerillo, La Plata
Attendance: 9,647
Referee: Luis Quiroz (Ecuador)
4 May 2023
21:00 UTC−5

Universitario (Peru)	2–0	(Colombia) Santa Fe
Herrera 11'; Di Benedetto 66'	Report

Estadio Monumental, Lima
Attendance: 48,391
Referee: Gustavo Tejera (Uruguay)

23 May 2023
19:00 UTC−3

Gimnasia y Esgrima (Argentina)	1–0	(Colombia) Santa Fe
Torres 90+2'	Report

Estadio Juan Carmelo Zerillo, La Plata
Attendance: 8,441
Referee: Ángel Arteaga (Venezuela)
23 May 2023
19:00 UTC−3

Goiás (Brazil)	1–0	(Peru) Universitario
Apodi 89'	Report

Estádio da Serrinha, Goiânia
Attendance: 9,435
Referee: Guillermo Guerrero (Ecuador)

8 June 2023
19:00 UTC−3

Goiás (Brazil)	0–0	(Argentina) Gimnasia y Esgrima
	Report

Estádio da Serrinha, Goiânia
Attendance: 7,928
Referee: Ivo Méndez (Bolivia)
8 June 2023
21:00 UTC−5

Santa Fe (Colombia)	2–0	(Peru) Universitario
Rodallega 27'; N. Moreno 78'	Report

Estadio El Campín, Bogotá
Attendance: 9,863
Referee: Felipe González (Chile)

28 June 2023
21:00 UTC−5

Santa Fe (Colombia)	1–2	(Brazil) Goiás
Rodallega 72'	Report	Guilherme 24'; Matheusinho 90+5'

Estadio El Campín, Bogotá
Attendance: 16,945
Referee: Leodán González (Uruguay)
28 June 2023
21:00 UTC−5

Universitario (Peru)	1–0	(Argentina) Gimnasia y Esgrima
Quispe 40'	Report

Estadio Monumental, Lima
Attendance: 50,056
Referee: Esteban Ostojich (Uruguay)

=== Group H ===
Pos	Team	Pld	W	D	L	GF	GA	GD	Pts	Qualification	FOR	SLO	PAL	EDM
1	(Brazil) Fortaleza	6	5	0	1	17	5	+12	15	Advance to round of 16	—	3–2	4–0	6–1
2	(Argentina) San Lorenzo	6	2	2	2	7	6	+1	8	Advance to knockout round play-offs	0–2	—	0–0	4–1
3	(Chile) Palestino	6	2	2	2	7	7	0	8		1–2	0–0	—	1–0
4	(Venezuela) Estudiantes de Mérida	6	1	0	5	4	17	−13	3		1–0	0–1	1–5	—

Source: CONMEBOL
4 April 2023
20:00 UTC−4

Estudiantes de Mérida (Venezuela)	0–1	(Argentina) San Lorenzo
	Report	Gattoni 33'

Estadio Metropolitano, Mérida
Attendance: 15,604
Referee: Roberto Sánchez (Ecuador)
5 April 2023
19:00 UTC−3

Fortaleza (Brazil)	4–0	(Chile) Palestino
Thiago Galhardo 4'; Pochettino 75', 90+4'; Lucero 90+1'	Report

Castelão, Fortaleza
Attendance: 26,073
Referee: Jhon Hinestroza (Colombia)

18 April 2023
20:00 UTC−4

Palestino (Chile)	1–0	(Venezuela) Estudiantes de Mérida
Dávila 53'	Report

Estadio El Teniente, Rancagua (Note: Palestino played their home matches at Estadio El Teniente, Rancagua instead of their regular stadium Estadio Municipal de La Cisterna, Santiago which did not meet CONMEBOL requirements.)
Attendance: 1,628
Referee: Michael Espinoza (Peru)
20 April 2023 (Note: The San Lorenzo v Fortaleza match, originally scheduled for 19 April 2023, was re-scheduled to 20 April 2023 due to security reasons.)
19:00 UTC−3

San Lorenzo (Argentina)	0–2	(Brazil) Fortaleza
	Report	Batalla 90' (o.g.); Guilherme 90+2'

Estadio Pedro Bidegain, Buenos Aires
Attendance: 14,222
Referee: Esteban Ostojich (Uruguay)

3 May 2023
18:00 UTC−4

Palestino (Chile)	0–0	(Argentina) San Lorenzo
	Report

Estadio El Teniente, Rancagua
Attendance: 1,772
Referee: Carlos Betancur (Colombia)
4 May 2023
21:00 UTC−3

Fortaleza (Brazil)	6–1	(Venezuela) Estudiantes de Mérida
Yago Pikachu 29' (pen.); Zé Welison 43'; Thiago Galhardo 72' (pen.); Calebe 76'; Moisés 86'; Romero 90+1'	Report	Arenas 45+5'

Castelão, Fortaleza
Attendance: 28,534
Referee: Jhon Hinestroza (Colombia)

24 May 2023
19:00 UTC−3

Fortaleza (Brazil)	3–2	(Argentina) San Lorenzo
Luján 17' (o.g.); Romero 25'; Yago Pikachu 90+7' (pen.)	Report	Maroni 20', 56'

Castelão, Fortaleza
Referee: Gustavo Tejera (Uruguay)
25 May 2023
20:00 UTC−4

Estudiantes de Mérida (Venezuela)	1–5	(Chile) Palestino
Arenas 33'	Report	Carrasco 24' (pen.), 69'; Barticciotto 26'; Farías 73'; Doldán 82' (o.g.)

Estadio Metropolitano, Mérida
Referee: Augusto Aragón (Ecuador)

6 June 2023
18:00 UTC−4

Estudiantes de Mérida (Venezuela)	1–0	(Brazil) Fortaleza
Zorrilla 62'	Report

Estadio Metropolitano, Mérida
Attendance: 576
Referee: Jhon Hinestroza (Colombia)
8 June 2023
21:00 UTC−3

San Lorenzo (Argentina)	0–0	(Chile) Palestino
	Report

Estadio Pedro Bidegain, Buenos Aires
Attendance: 14,110
Referee: Diego Haro (Peru)

27 June 2023
19:00 UTC−3

San Lorenzo (Argentina)	4–1	(Venezuela) Estudiantes de Mérida
Bareiro 45+4' (pen.), 55'; Braida 70'; Barrios 71'	Report	Arenas 3'

Estadio Pedro Bidegain, Buenos Aires
Attendance: 10,088
Referee: Gery Vargas (Bolivia)
27 June 2023
18:00 UTC−4

Palestino (Chile)	1–2	(Brazil) Fortaleza
Farías 76'	Report	Lucas Crispim 20'; Lucero 74'

Estadio El Teniente, Rancagua
Attendance: 871
Referee: Carlos Ortega (Colombia)
