= 2023 Copa Sudamericana =

Copa CONMEBOL Sudamericana 2023
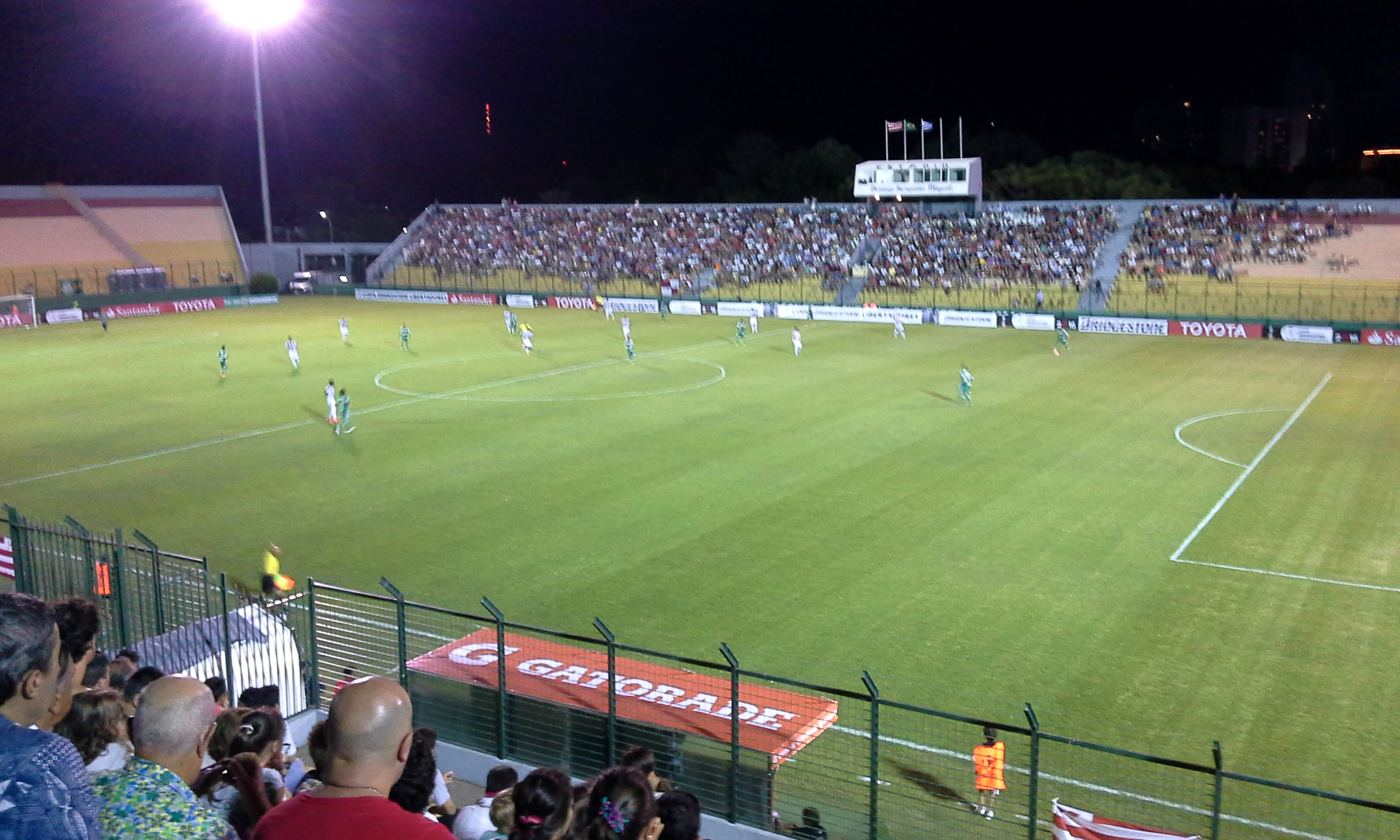
- The Estadio Domingo Burgueño in Maldonado hosted the final

Tournament details
- Dates: 7 March – 28 October 2023
- Teams: 44+12 (from 10 associations)

Final positions
- Champions: (Ecuador) LDU Quito (2nd title)
- Runners-up: (Brazil) Fortaleza

Tournament statistics
- Matches played: 157
- Goals scored: 396 (2.52 per match)
- Top scorer: (Uruguay) Gonzalo Mastriani (9 goals)

The 2023 Copa CONMEBOL Sudamericana was the 22nd edition of the CONMEBOL Sudamericana (also referred to as the Copa Sudamericana), South America's secondary club football tournament organized by CONMEBOL.

The final was played in Maldonado, Uruguay on 28 October 2023. Originally scheduled to be held in Montevideo, on 15 April 2023 it was announced that the final would be played at Estadio Centenario, however the match was confirmed to have been moved to Estadio Domingo Burgueño in Maldonado on 15 September 2023.

Ecuadorian club LDU Quito were the champions, winning their second title in the competition after defeating Brazilian club Fortaleza 4–3 on penalties following a 1–1 draw after extra time in the final. As winners of the 2023 Copa Sudamericana, LDU Quito earned the right to play against the winners of the 2023 Copa Libertadores in the 2024 Recopa Sudamericana. They also automatically qualified for the 2024 Copa Libertadores group stage.

Independiente del Valle were the titleholders, but did not defend their title since they qualified for the 2023 Copa Libertadores group stage as Copa Sudamericana champions and later advanced to the knockout stage.

== Format changes ==
On 19 December 2022, CONMEBOL announced format changes to the Copa Sudamericana starting from this edition while maintaining the same number of matches to be played. The following changes were implemented:

- The first stage of the tournament, where teams from all associations (except Argentina and Brazil) play against a team from their same association, was played over a single match instead of a home-and-away two-legged basis.
- The eight group runner-ups were not eliminated, but instead played a play-off round prior to the round of 16 against the eight third-placed teams of the Copa Libertadores group stage, which previously advanced directly to the round of 16. The winners of this round advanced to the round of 16 along with the Copa Sudamericana group winners.

== Teams ==
The following 44 teams from the 10 CONMEBOL associations qualified for the tournament:

- Argentina and Brazil: 6 berths each
- All other associations: 4 berths each

The entry stage was determined as follows:

- Group stage: 12 teams (teams from Argentina and Brazil)
- First stage: 32 teams (teams from all other associations)

Association	Team (Berth)	Entry stage	Qualification method
Argentina (6 berths)	Gimnasia y Esgrima (Argentina 1)	Group stage	2022 Copa de la Liga Profesional and Primera División aggregate table best team not qualified for 2023 Copa Libertadores
Argentina (6 berths)	Defensa y Justicia (Argentina 2)	Group stage	2022 Copa de la Liga Profesional and Primera División aggregate table 2nd best team not qualified for 2023 Copa Libertadores
Argentina (6 berths)	Tigre (Argentina 3)	Group stage	2022 Copa de la Liga Profesional and Primera División aggregate table 3rd best team not qualified for 2023 Copa Libertadores
Argentina (6 berths)	Newell's Old Boys (Argentina 4)	Group stage	2022 Copa de la Liga Profesional and Primera División aggregate table 4th best team not qualified for 2023 Copa Libertadores
Argentina (6 berths)	Estudiantes (Argentina 5)	Group stage	2022 Copa de la Liga Profesional and Primera División aggregate table 5th best team not qualified for 2023 Copa Libertadores
Argentina (6 berths)	San Lorenzo (Argentina 6)	Group stage	2022 Copa de la Liga Profesional and Primera División aggregate table 6th best team not qualified for 2023 Copa Libertadores
Bolivia (4 berths)	Oriente Petrolero (Bolivia 1)	First stage	2022 Primera División aggregate table best team not qualified for 2023 Copa Libertadores
Bolivia (4 berths)	Guabirá (Bolivia 2)	First stage	2022 Primera División aggregate table 2nd best team not qualified for 2023 Copa Libertadores
Bolivia (4 berths)	Atlético Palmaflor (Bolivia 3)	First stage	2022 Primera División aggregate table 3rd best team not qualified for 2023 Copa Libertadores
Bolivia (4 berths)	Blooming (Bolivia 4)	First stage	2022 Primera División aggregate table 4th best team not qualified for 2023 Copa Libertadores
Brazil (6 berths)	São Paulo (Brazil 1)	Group stage	2022 Campeonato Brasileiro Série A best team not qualified for 2023 Copa Libertadores
Brazil (6 berths)	América Mineiro (Brazil 2)	Group stage	2022 Campeonato Brasileiro Série A 2nd best team not qualified for 2023 Copa Libertadores
Brazil (6 berths)	Botafogo (Brazil 3)	Group stage	2022 Campeonato Brasileiro Série A 3rd best team not qualified for 2023 Copa Libertadores
Brazil (6 berths)	Santos (Brazil 4)	Group stage	2022 Campeonato Brasileiro Série A 4th best team not qualified for 2023 Copa Libertadores
Brazil (6 berths)	Goiás (Brazil 5)	Group stage	2022 Campeonato Brasileiro Série A 5th best team not qualified for 2023 Copa Libertadores
Brazil (6 berths)	Red Bull Bragantino (Brazil 6)	Group stage	2022 Campeonato Brasileiro Série A 6th best team not qualified for 2023 Copa Libertadores
Chile (4 berths)	Palestino (Chile 1)	First stage	2022 Primera División best team not qualified for 2023 Copa Libertadores
Chile (4 berths)	Cobresal (Chile 2)	First stage	2022 Primera División 2nd best team not qualified for 2023 Copa Libertadores
Chile (4 berths)	Universidad Católica (Chile 3)	First stage	2022 Primera División 3rd best team not qualified for 2023 Copa Libertadores
Chile (4 berths)	Audax Italiano (Chile 4)	First stage	2022 Primera División 4th best team not qualified for 2023 Copa Libertadores
Colombia (4 berths)	Deportes Tolima (Colombia 1)	First stage	2022 Primera A aggregate table best team not qualified for 2023 Copa Libertadores
Colombia (4 berths)	Junior (Colombia 2)	First stage	2022 Primera A aggregate table 2nd best team not qualified for 2023 Copa Libertadores
Colombia (4 berths)	Santa Fe (Colombia 3)	First stage	2022 Primera A aggregate table 3rd best team not qualified for 2023 Copa Libertadores
Colombia (4 berths)	Águilas Doradas (Colombia 4)	First stage	2022 Primera A aggregate table 4th best team not qualified for 2023 Copa Libertadores
Ecuador (4 berths)	LDU Quito (Ecuador 1)	First stage	2022 Serie A aggregate table best team not qualified for 2023 Copa Libertadores
Ecuador (4 berths)	Emelec (Ecuador 2)	First stage	2022 Serie A aggregate table 2nd best team not qualified for 2023 Copa Libertadores
Ecuador (4 berths)	Deportivo Cuenca (Ecuador 3)	First stage	2022 Serie A aggregate table 3rd best team not qualified for 2023 Copa Libertadores
Ecuador (4 berths)	Delfín (Ecuador 4)	First stage	2022 Serie A aggregate table 4th best team not qualified for 2023 Copa Libertadores
Paraguay (4 berths)	Guaraní (Paraguay 1)	First stage	2022 Primera División aggregate table best team not qualified for 2023 Copa Libertadores
Paraguay (4 berths)	Tacuary (Paraguay 2)	First stage	2022 Primera División aggregate table 2nd best team not qualified for 2023 Copa Libertadores
Paraguay (4 berths)	General Caballero (JLM) (Paraguay 3)	First stage	2022 Primera División aggregate table 3rd best team not qualified for 2023 Copa Libertadores
Paraguay (4 berths)	Sportivo Ameliano (Paraguay 4)	First stage	2022 Copa Paraguay champions
Peru (4 berths)	Universitario (Peru 1)	First stage	2022 Liga 1 aggregate table best team not qualified for 2023 Copa Libertadores
Peru (4 berths)	Universidad César Vallejo (Peru 2)	First stage	2022 Liga 1 aggregate table 2nd best team not qualified for 2023 Copa Libertadores
Peru (4 berths)	Cienciano (Peru 3)	First stage	2022 Liga 1 aggregate table 3rd best team not qualified for 2023 Copa Libertadores
Peru (4 berths)	Binacional (Peru 4)	First stage	2022 Liga 1 aggregate table 4th best team not qualified for 2023 Copa Libertadores
Uruguay (4 berths)	River Plate (Uruguay 1)	First stage	2022 Primera División aggregate table best team not qualified for 2023 Copa Libertadores
Uruguay (4 berths)	Peñarol (Uruguay 2)	First stage	2022 Primera División aggregate table 2nd best team not qualified for 2023 Copa Libertadores
Uruguay (4 berths)	Defensor Sporting (Uruguay 3)	First stage	2022 Primera División aggregate table 3rd best team not qualified for 2023 Copa Libertadores
Uruguay (4 berths)	Danubio (Uruguay 4)	First stage	2022 Primera División aggregate table 4th best team not qualified for 2023 Copa Libertadores
Venezuela (4 berths)	Estudiantes de Mérida (Venezuela 1)	First stage	2022 Primera División Fase Final Sudamericana A winners
Venezuela (4 berths)	Deportivo Táchira (Venezuela 2)	First stage	2022 Primera División Fase Final Sudamericana B winners
Venezuela (4 berths)	Caracas (Venezuela 3)	First stage	2022 Primera División Fase Final Sudamericana A runners-up
Venezuela (4 berths)	Academia Puerto Cabello (Venezuela 4)	First stage	2022 Primera División Fase Final Sudamericana B runners-up

Notes

1. Bolivia (BOL): Since the 2022 Copa Bolivia was cancelled and the 2022 Clausura tournament was abandoned due to civil unrest, the four Copa Sudamericana berths allocated to Bolivia were awarded through aggregate table placement at the time of abandonment.
2. Peru (PER): Due to the cancellation of the 2022 Copa Bicentenario, the Peru 4 berth which was originally allocated to the winners of said competition passed over to the 2022 Liga 1 aggregate table 4th best team not qualified for the 2023 Copa Libertadores.

A further 12 teams eliminated from the 2023 Copa Libertadores were transferred to the Copa Sudamericana, entering the group stage and the knockout round play-offs.

Teams eliminated in third stage	Entry stage
(Colombia) Millonarios	Group stage
(Argentina) Huracán	Group stage
(Brazil) Fortaleza	Group stage
(Chile) Magallanes	Group stage
Third-placed teams in group stage	Entry stage
(Chile) Ñublense	Knockout round play-offs
(Colombia) Independiente Medellín	Knockout round play-offs
(Ecuador) Barcelona	Knockout round play-offs
(Peru) Sporting Cristal	Knockout round play-offs
(Brazil) Corinthians	Knockout round play-offs
(Chile) Colo-Colo	Knockout round play-offs
(Paraguay) Libertad	Knockout round play-offs
(Argentina) Patronato	Knockout round play-offs

== Schedule ==
The schedule of the competition was as follows:

Stage	Draw date	First leg	Second leg
First stage	21 December 2022	7–9 March 2023	
Group stage	27 March 2023	Matchday 1: 4–6 April 2023; Matchday 2: 18–20 April 2023; Matchday 3: 2–4 May 2023; Matchday 4: 23–25 May 2023; Matchday 5: 6–8 June 2023; Matchday 6: 27–29 June 2023	
Knockout round play-offs	No draw	11–13 July 2023	18–20 July 2023
Round of 16	5 July 2023	1–3 August 2023	8–10 August 2023
Quarter-finals	5 July 2023	22–24 August 2023	29–31 August 2023
Semi-finals	5 July 2023	26–27 September 2023	3–4 October 2023
Final	5 July 2023	28 October 2023 at Estadio Domingo Burgueño, Maldonado	

== Draws ==
Location of teams of the 2023 Copa Sudamericana.
Brown: Group A; Red: Group B; Orange: Group C;
Yellow: Group D; Green: Group E; Blue: Group F;
Purple: Group G; Pink: Group H; White: First stage;
Turquoise: Knockout round play-offs entrants.
(L) Teams transferred from the 2023 Copa Libertadores.

The draw for the first stage was held on 21 December 2022, 12:00 PYST (UTC−3), at the CONMEBOL Convention Centre in Luque, Paraguay. For the first stage, the 32 teams involved were divided into eight pots according to their national association.

The 32 teams were drawn into 16 ties, with the four teams from each national association being drawn against a rival from the same association in two ties per association. The draw for the group stage was held on 27 March 2023, 20:00 PYT (UTC−4), at the CONMEBOL Convention Centre in Luque, Paraguay.

Teams were seeded by their CONMEBOL Clubs ranking as of 9 December 2022 (shown in parentheses), taking into account the following three factors:

1. Performance in the last 10 years, taking into account Copa Libertadores and Copa Sudamericana results in the period 2013–2022.
2. Historical coefficient, taking into account Copa Libertadores and Copa Sudamericana results in the period 1960–2012 and 2002–2012 respectively.
3. Local tournament champion, with bonus points awarded to domestic league champions of the last 10 years.

For the group stage, the 32 teams were drawn into eight groups (Groups A–H) of four containing a team from each of the four pots. The four losers of the Copa Libertadores third stage were seeded into Pot 4. Teams from the same association could not be drawn into the same group.

Group stage draw
Pot 1	Pot 2	Pot 3	Pot 4
(Uruguay) Peñarol (8); (Brazil) São Paulo (9); (Brazil) Santos (10); (Ecuador) LDU Quito (21); (Argentina) Estudiantes (23); (Ecuador) Emelec (29); (Argentina) San Lorenzo (31); (Colombia) Santa Fe (34)	(Argentina) Defensa y Justicia (37); (Paraguay) Guaraní (41); (Brazil) Red Bull Bragantino (45); (Peru) Universitario (46); (Colombia) Deportes Tolima (47); (Brazil) Botafogo (59); (Argentina) Newell's Old Boys (61); (Chile) Palestino (67)	(Bolivia) Oriente Petrolero (81); (Venezuela) Estudiantes de Mérida (96); (Uruguay) Danubio (103); (Argentina) Tigre (108); (Brazil) América Mineiro (118); (Bolivia) Blooming (121); (Brazil) Goiás (136); (Peru) Universidad César Vallejo (149)	(Chile) Audax Italiano (153); (Argentina) Gimnasia y Esgrima (162); (Venezuela) Academia Puerto Cabello (232); (Paraguay) Tacuary (No rank); (Colombia) Millonarios (57); (Argentina) Huracán (58); (Brazil) Fortaleza (78); (Chile) Magallanes (215)

Notes

1. ^{CLQ3} The Copa Libertadores third stage losers were seeded in Pot 4.

The draw for the round of 16 was held on 5 July 2023, 12:00 PYT (UTC−4) at the CONMEBOL Convention Center in Luque, Paraguay. For the round of 16, the 16 teams were drawn into eight ties (A–H) between a Copa Sudamericana group winner (Pot 1) and a knockout round play-offs winner (Pot 2), with the group winners hosting the second leg. Teams from the same association or the same group could be drawn into the same tie (Regulations Article 2.2.3.2).

== First stage ==
In the first stage, each tie was played as a single-leg match. If tied after 90 minutes, extra time would not be played, and a penalty shoot-out would be used to determine the winner (Regulations Article 2.4.2).

The 16 winners of the first stage advanced to the group stage to join the 12 teams directly qualified for that stage (six from Argentina and six from Brazil), and four teams transferred from the Copa Libertadores (the four teams eliminated in the third stage of qualifying).

Team 1	Score	Team 2
Guabirá (Bolivia)	0–1	(Bolivia) Oriente Petrolero
Blooming (Bolivia)	6–0	(Bolivia) Atlético Palmaflor
Cobresal (Chile)	0–1	(Chile) Palestino
Audax Italiano (Chile)	3–2	(Chile) Universidad Católica
Deportes Tolima (Colombia)	1–0	(Colombia) Junior
Águilas Doradas (Colombia)	1–2	(Colombia) Santa Fe
LDU Quito (Ecuador)	4–0	(Ecuador) Delfín
Emelec (Ecuador)	2–1	(Ecuador) Deportivo Cuenca
Guaraní (Paraguay)	3–1	(Paraguay) Sportivo Ameliano
Tacuary (Paraguay)	2–2 (4–2 p)	(Paraguay) General Caballero (JLM)
Universidad César Vallejo (Peru)	3–1	(Peru) Binacional
Universitario (Peru)	2–0	(Peru) Cienciano
Defensor Sporting (Uruguay)	0–0 (3–4 p)	(Uruguay) Danubio
River Plate (Uruguay)	0–4	(Uruguay) Peñarol
Caracas (Venezuela)	0–1	(Venezuela) Academia Puerto Cabello
Estudiantes de Mérida (Venezuela)	1–1 (3–1 p)	(Venezuela) Deportivo Táchira

== Group stage ==
In the group stage, each group was played on a home-and-away round-robin basis. The teams were ranked according to the following criteria: 1. Points (3 points for a win, 1 point for a draw, and 0 points for a loss); 2. Goal difference; 3. Goals scored; 4. Away goals scored; 5. CONMEBOL ranking (Regulations Article 2.4.2).

The winners of each group advanced to the round of 16 of the final stages, whilst the runners-up of each group advanced to the knockout round play-offs of the final stages.

=== Group A ===
Pos	Team	Pld	W	D	L	GF	GA	GD	Pts	Qualification	LDQ	BOT	MAG	UCV
1	(Ecuador) LDU Quito	6	3	3	0	10	2	+8	12	Round of 16	—	0–0	4–0	3–0
2	(Brazil) Botafogo	6	2	4	0	10	5	+5	10	Knockout round play-offs	0–0	—	1–1	4–0
3	(Chile) Magallanes	6	0	4	2	8	13	−5	4		1–1	2–2	—	2–2
4	(Peru) Universidad César Vallejo	6	1	1	4	8	16	−8	4		1–2	2–3	3–2	—

Source: CONMEBOL

=== Group B ===
Pos	Team	Pld	W	D	L	GF	GA	GD	Pts	Qualification	GUA	EME	DAN	HUR
1	(Paraguay) Guaraní	6	3	2	1	9	7	+2	11	Round of 16	—	1–1	2–1	2–0
2	(Ecuador) Emelec	6	2	3	1	7	7	0	9	Knockout round play-offs	1–1	—	2–1	1–0
3	(Uruguay) Danubio	6	2	1	3	6	7	−1	7		0–2	2–0	—	1–0
4	(Argentina) Huracán	6	1	2	3	7	8	−1	5		4–1	2–2	1–1	—

Source: CONMEBOL

=== Group C ===
Pos	Team	Pld	W	D	L	GF	GA	GD	Pts	Qualification	RBB	EST	TAC	ORI
1	(Brazil) Red Bull Bragantino	6	4	2	0	21	3	+18	14	Round of 16	—	0–0	7–1	5–0
2	(Argentina) Estudiantes	6	4	2	0	14	1	+13	14	Knockout round play-offs	1–1	—	4–0	4–0
3	(Paraguay) Tacuary	6	2	0	4	8	21	−13	6		1–4	0–4	—	3–1
4	(Bolivia) Oriente Petrolero	6	0	0	6	2	20	−18	0		0–4	0–1	1–3	—

Source: CONMEBOL

=== Group D ===
Pos	Team	Pld	W	D	L	GF	GA	GD	Pts	Qualification	SPA	TIG	TOL	APC
1	(Brazil) São Paulo	6	5	1	0	13	0	+13	16	Round of 16	—	2–0	5–0	2–0
2	(Argentina) Tigre	6	3	1	2	7	6	+1	10	Knockout round play-offs	0–2	—	0–0	2–1
3	(Colombia) Deportes Tolima	6	2	2	2	6	8	−2	8		0–0	1–2	—	3–1
4	(Venezuela) Academia Puerto Cabello	6	0	0	6	2	14	−12	0		0–2	0–3	0–2	—

Source: CONMEBOL

=== Group E ===
Pos	Team	Pld	W	D	L	GF	GA	GD	Pts	Qualification	NOB	AUD	SAN	BLO
1	(Argentina) Newell's Old Boys	6	5	1	0	11	4	+7	16	Round of 16	—	1–1	1–0	3–0
2	(Chile) Audax Italiano	6	3	2	1	7	4	+3	11	Knockout round play-offs	0–1	—	2–1	2–0
3	(Brazil) Santos	6	1	2	3	3	5	−2	5		1–2	0–0	—	0–0
4	(Bolivia) Blooming	6	0	1	5	3	11	−8	1		2–3	1–2	0–1	—

Source: CONMEBOL

=== Group F ===
Pos	Team	Pld	W	D	L	GF	GA	GD	Pts	Qualification	DYJ	AMG	MIL	PEÑ
1	(Argentina) Defensa y Justicia	6	5	0	1	15	8	+7	15	Round of 16	—	2–1	3–1	4–1
2	(Brazil) América Mineiro	6	3	1	2	12	8	+4	10	Knockout round play-offs	2–3	—	2–0	4–1
3	(Colombia) Millonarios	6	3	1	2	10	7	+3	10		3–0	1–1	—	3–1
4	(Uruguay) Peñarol	6	0	0	6	4	18	−14	0		0–3	1–2	0–2	—

Source: CONMEBOL

=== Group G ===
Pos	Team	Pld	W	D	L	GF	GA	GD	Pts	Qualification	GOI	UNI	SFE	GLP
1	(Brazil) Goiás	6	3	3	0	7	3	+4	12	Round of 16	—	1–0	0–0	0–0
2	(Peru) Universitario	6	3	1	2	6	5	+1	10	Knockout round play-offs	2–2	—	2–0	1–0
3	(Colombia) Santa Fe	6	2	1	3	5	6	−1	7		1–2	2–0	—	2–1
4	(Argentina) Gimnasia y Esgrima	6	1	1	4	2	6	−4	4		0–2	0–1	1–0	—

Source: CONMEBOL

=== Group H ===
Pos	Team	Pld	W	D	L	GF	GA	GD	Pts	Qualification	FOR	SLO	PAL	EDM
1	(Brazil) Fortaleza	6	5	0	1	17	5	+12	15	Round of 16	—	3–2	4–0	6–1
2	(Argentina) San Lorenzo	6	2	2	2	7	6	+1	8	Knockout round play-offs	0–2	—	0–0	4–1
3	(Chile) Palestino	6	2	2	2	7	7	0	8		1–2	0–0	—	1–0
4	(Venezuela) Estudiantes de Mérida	6	1	0	5	4	17	−13	3		1–0	0–1	1–5	—

Source: CONMEBOL

== Final stages ==
Starting from the knockout round play-offs, the teams played a single-elimination tournament with the following rules:

- In the knockout round play-offs, round of 16, quarter-finals and semi-finals, each tie was played on a home-and-away two-legged basis, with the higher-seeded team hosting the second leg (Regulations Article 2.2.3). If tied on aggregate, extra time was not played, and a penalty shoot-out was used to determine the winners (Regulations Article 2.4.4).
- The final was played as a single match at a venue pre-selected by CONMEBOL, with the higher-seeded team designated as the "home" team for administrative purposes (Regulations Article 2.2.6). If tied after regulation, 30 minutes of extra time were played. If still tied after extra time, a penalty shoot-out was used to determine the winners (Regulations Article 2.4.5).

=== Seeding ===
For the final stages, the teams are seeded according to their results in the group stage, with the Copa Sudamericana group winners seeded 1–8, the Copa Sudamericana group runners-up seeded 9–16, and the Copa Libertadores group third-placed teams seeded 17–24. For the round of 16 draw, the seeds 1–8 made up Pot 1, and the eight knockout round play-offs winners (seeds 9–24) made up Pot 2, keeping their seed. Teams from the same association may play each other from the knockout round play-offs onwards.

Seed	Grp	Team	Pld	W	D	L	GF	GA	GD	Pts	Qualification
1	SD1	(Brazil) São Paulo	6	5	1	0	13	0	+13	16	Round of 16
2	SE1	(Argentina) Newell's Old Boys	6	5	1	0	11	4	+7	16	Round of 16
3	SH1	(Brazil) Fortaleza	6	5	0	1	17	5	+12	15	Round of 16
4	SF1	(Argentina) Defensa y Justicia	6	5	0	1	15	8	+7	15	Round of 16
5	SC1	(Brazil) Red Bull Bragantino	6	4	2	0	21	3	+18	14	Round of 16
6	SA1	(Ecuador) LDU Quito	6	3	3	0	10	2	+8	12	Round of 16
7	SG1	(Brazil) Goiás	6	3	3	0	7	3	+4	12	Round of 16
8	SB1	(Paraguay) Guaraní	6	3	2	1	9	7	+2	11	Round of 16
9	SC2	(Argentina) Estudiantes	6	4	2	0	14	1	+13	14	Play-off Match A
10	SE2	(Chile) Audax Italiano	6	3	2	1	7	4	+3	11	Play-off Match B
11	SA2	(Brazil) Botafogo	6	2	4	0	10	5	+5	10	Play-off Match C
12	SF2	(Brazil) América Mineiro	6	3	1	2	12	8	+4	10	Play-off Match D
13	SD2	(Argentina) Tigre	6	3	1	2	7	6	+1	10	Play-off Match E
14	SG2	(Peru) Universitario	6	3	1	2	6	5	+1	10	Play-off Match F
15	SB2	(Ecuador) Emelec	6	2	3	1	7	7	0	9	Play-off Match G
16	SH2	(Argentina) San Lorenzo	6	2	2	2	7	6	+1	8	Play-off Match H
17	LB	(Colombia) Independiente Medellín	6	3	1	2	10	9	+1	10	Play-off Match H
18	LD	(Peru) Sporting Cristal	6	2	2	2	8	10	−2	8	Play-off Match G
19	LE	(Brazil) Corinthians	6	2	1	3	7	6	+1	7	Play-off Match F
20	LG	(Paraguay) Libertad	6	2	1	3	6	7	−1	7	Play-off Match E
21	LF	(Chile) Colo-Colo	6	1	3	2	3	5	−2	6	Play-off Match D
22	LH	(Argentina) Patronato	6	2	0	4	6	11	−5	6	Play-off Match C
23	LA	(Chile) Ñublense	6	1	2	3	3	10	−7	5	Play-off Match B
24	LC	(Ecuador) Barcelona	6	1	1	4	7	12	−5	4	Play-off Match A

Source: CONMEBOL Sudamericana, CONMEBOL Libertadores
Rules for classification: 1) Higher position in group; 2) Points; 3) Goal difference; 4) Goals scored; 5) Away goals scored; 6) CONMEBOL ranking (Regulations Article 2.4.3).

=== Bracket ===
The bracket was decided based on the round of 16 draw, which was held on 5 July 2023.

Knockout round play-offs
19	(Brazil) Corinthians	1	2	3
14	(Peru) Universitario	0	1	1
24	(Ecuador) Barcelona	2	0	2
9	(Argentina) Estudiantes	1	4	5
21	(Chile) Colo-Colo	2	1	3
12	(Brazil) América Mineiro	1	5	6
20	(Paraguay) Libertad	2	1	3
13	(Argentina) Tigre	1	0	1
23	(Chile) Ñublense	0	1	1
10	(Chile) Audax Italiano	0	0	0
17	(Colombia) Independiente Medellín	0	0	0
16	(Argentina) San Lorenzo	1	2	3
22	(Argentina) Patronato	0	1	1
11	(Brazil) Botafogo	2	1	3
18	(Peru) Sporting Cristal	0	0	0
15	(Ecuador) Emelec	1	0	1

Round of 16
19	(Brazil) Corinthians	2	0	2
2	(Argentina) Newell's Old Boys	1	0	1
9	(Argentina) Estudiantes	3	2	5
7	(Brazil) Goiás	0	0	0
12	(Brazil) América Mineiro (p)	1	3	4 (4)
5	(Brazil) Red Bull Bragantino	1	3	4 (3)
20	(Paraguay) Libertad	0	1	1
3	(Brazil) Fortaleza	1	1	2
23	(Chile) Ñublense	0	3	3 (3)
6	(Ecuador) LDU Quito (p)	1	2	3 (4)
16	(Argentina) San Lorenzo	1	0	1
1	(Brazil) São Paulo	0	2	2
11	(Brazil) Botafogo	2	0	2
8	(Paraguay) Guaraní	1	0	1
15	(Ecuador) Emelec	1	0	1
4	(Argentina) Defensa y Justicia	2	1	3

Quarter-finals
19	(Brazil) Corinthians (p)	1	0	1 (3)
9	(Argentina) Estudiantes	0	1	1 (2)
12	(Brazil) América Mineiro	1	1	2
3	(Brazil) Fortaleza	3	2	5
6	(Ecuador) LDU Quito (p)	2	0	2 (5)
1	(Brazil) São Paulo	1	1	2 (4)
11	(Brazil) Botafogo	1	1	2
4	(Argentina) Defensa y Justicia	1	2	3

Semi-finals
19	(Brazil) Corinthians	1	0	1
3	(Brazil) Fortaleza	1	2	3
6	(Ecuador) LDU Quito	3	0	3
4	(Argentina) Defensa y Justicia	0	0	0

Final
28 October – Maldonado
3	(Brazil) Fortaleza	1 (3)
6	(Ecuador) LDU Quito (p)	1 (4)

=== Knockout round play-offs ===
Team 1	Agg.	Team 2	1st leg	2nd leg
Barcelona (Ecuador)	2–5	(Argentina) Estudiantes	2–1	0–4
Ñublense (Chile)	1–0	(Chile) Audax Italiano	0–0	1–0
Patronato (Argentina)	1–3	(Brazil) Botafogo	0–2	1–1
Colo-Colo (Chile)	3–6	(Brazil) América Mineiro	2–1	1–5
Libertad (Paraguay)	3–1	(Argentina) Tigre	2–1	1–0
Corinthians (Brazil)	3–1	(Peru) Universitario	1–0	2–1
Sporting Cristal (Peru)	0–1	(Ecuador) Emelec	0–1	0–0
Independiente Medellín (Colombia)	0–3	(Argentina) San Lorenzo	0–1	0–2

=== Round of 16 ===
Team 1	Agg.	Team 2	1st leg	2nd leg
Emelec (Ecuador)	1–3	(Argentina) Defensa y Justicia	1–2	0–1
Estudiantes (Argentina)	5–0	(Brazil) Goiás	3–0	2–0
América Mineiro (Brazil)	4–4 (4–3 p)	(Brazil) Red Bull Bragantino	1–1	3–3
San Lorenzo (Argentina)	1–2	(Brazil) São Paulo	1–0	0–2
Ñublense (Chile)	3–3 (3–4 p)	(Ecuador) LDU Quito	0–1	3–2
Libertad (Paraguay)	1–2	(Brazil) Fortaleza	0–1	1–1
Corinthians (Brazil)	2–1	(Argentina) Newell's Old Boys	2–1	0–0
Botafogo (Brazil)	2–1	(Paraguay) Guaraní	2–1	0–0

=== Quarter-finals ===
Team 1	Agg.	Team 2	1st leg	2nd leg
Botafogo (Brazil)	2–3	(Argentina) Defensa y Justicia	1–1	1–2
Corinthians (Brazil)	1–1 (3–2 p)	(Argentina) Estudiantes	1–0	0–1
América Mineiro (Brazil)	2–5	(Brazil) Fortaleza	1–3	1–2
LDU Quito (Ecuador)	2–2 (5–4 p)	(Brazil) São Paulo	2–1	0–1

=== Semi-finals ===
Team 1	Agg.	Team 2	1st leg	2nd leg
LDU Quito (Ecuador)	3–0	(Argentina) Defensa y Justicia	3–0	0–0
Corinthians (Brazil)	1–3	(Brazil) Fortaleza	1–1	0–2

=== Final ===
28 October 2023
17:00 UTC−3

Fortaleza (Brazil)	1–1 (a.e.t.)	(Ecuador) LDU Quito
Lucero 48'	Report	Alzugaray 56'
Penalties
Thiago Galhardo (penalty scored); Yago Pikachu (penalty scored); Romero (penalty missed); Tinga (penalty scored); Pedro Augusto (penalty missed); Brítez (penalty missed)	3–4	(penalty missed) Guerrero; (penalty scored) Alzugaray; (penalty scored) Martínez; (penalty scored) Julio; (penalty missed) Alvarado; (penalty scored) Piovi

Estadio Domingo Burgueño, Maldonado
Attendance: 17,420
Referee: Jesús Valenzuela (Venezuela)

== Statistics ==
=== Top scorers ===
Rank	Player	Team	1S	GS1	GS2	GS3	GS4	GS5	GS6	KPO1	KPO2	⅛F1	⅛F2	QF1	QF2	SF1	SF2	F	Total
1	(Uruguay) Gonzalo Mastriani	(Brazil) América Mineiro		2			1				2	1	2	1					9
2	(Argentina) Nicolás Fernández	(Argentina) Defensa y Justicia				1		1	3			1			2				8
3	(Paraguay) Adam Bareiro	(Argentina) San Lorenzo							2	1	2	1							6
3	(Argentina) Benjamín Rollheiser	(Argentina) Estudiantes						1	1		1	2	1						6
3	(Paraguay) Federico Santander	(Paraguay) Guaraní	1	1	1	1	1		1										6
6	(Brazil) Eduardo Sasha	(Brazil) Red Bull Bragantino			1		1		3										5
6	(Brazil) Sorriso	(Brazil) Red Bull Bragantino			1				2				2						5
6	(Argentina) Gastón Togni	(Argentina) Defensa y Justicia				1	2	1				1							5

Source: CONMEBOL

== See also ==
- 2023 Copa Libertadores
