= Bryan Carabalí =

Ecuadorean footballer (born 1997)

Personal information
- Full name: Bryan Ignacio Carabalí Cañola
- Date of birth: 18 December 1997 (age 28)
- Place of birth: Quinindé
- Height: 1.67 m (5 ft 5 1/2 in)
- Position: Defender

Team information
- Current team: Barcelona S.C.
- Number: 18

Youth career
- –2015: C.D. Cuenca

Senior career*
Years	Team	Apps	(Gls)
2015–2019	C.D. Cuenca	118	(2)
2019–2024	C.S. Emelec	118	(3)
2024–	Barcelona S.C.	38	(1)

International career
2019	Ecuador	2	(0)
- * Club domestic league appearances and goals as of 31 December 2025

Bryan Ignacio Carabalí Cañola (born Quinindé, Ecuador, 18 December 1997) is an Ecuadorean footballer who plays as a defender for Barcelona S.C. in the Ecuadorian Serie A.

== Early life and education ==
Carabali moved to C.S. Emelec from his home city of Quinindé with his family when he was nine years old as the family searched for work. His father, Dixson Carabali, permitted him to attend football training as long as he completed his school studies. Carabali continued studying at night school even after he had made his full first team debut for C.D. Cuenca in 2015, aged 17 years-old.

== Career ==
Carabali had made over a hundred appearances by 17 July 2019 for C.D. Cuenca when it was announced he was to go on loan to C.S. Emelec until June 2020, with the option to buy, should he perform well. In August 2019 it was announced that Emelec had bought his contract outright and it had been extended until 2024. He joined Barcelona S.C. in 2024.

== International career ==
In November 2019 he was called up to the national team by coach Jorge Célico to play friendlies against Trinidad and Tobago national football team on 14 November and against Colombia national football team on 19 November. Carabali started both games, making his debut in the 3–0 win over Trinidad and Tobago at the Estadio Reales Tamarindos.
