= Marcos Portillo =

Argentine association football player

Personal information
- Full name: Marcos Ezekiel Portillo
- Date of birth: 31 January 2000 (age 26)
- Position: Midfielder

Team information
- Current team: Melgar (on loan from Talleres de Córdoba)
- Number: 26

Youth career
- –2014: Tiro Federal
- 2015: Unión de Alvarez
- 2015–2021: Newells Old Boys

Senior career*
Years	Team	Apps	(Gls)
2021–2024	Newells Old Boys	42	(0)
2024–	Talleres de Córdoba	23	(3)
2025–2026	→ Platense (loan)	4	(0)
2026–	→ Melgar (loan)	8	(0)
- * Club domestic league appearances and goals as of 17:52, 4 October 2026 (UTC)

Marcos Ezequiel Portillo (born 31 January 2000) is an Argentine professional footballer who plays as a midfielder for Melgar, on loan from Talleres de Córdoba in the Argentine Primera División.

== Career ==
From Banana Villa, Rosario in the Santa Fe Province of Argentina, Portillo came through the academy at Newells Old Boys after joining the club in 2015, following spells as a youth with Tiro Federal until 2024, and Unión de Alvarez in 2015. In 2021, he signed his first professional contract with the club. He made his debut for the club in the Argentine Primera Division against San Lorenzo on 12 December 2021. For Newells, Portillo made more than 50 senior appearances, and featured in the Copa Sudamericana. In January 2024, he signed for Talleres de Córdoba. He made his debut that week against Gimnasia, and scored his first league goal for the club in a 2–1 win over Huracán on 30 January 2024.
