= Éder (footballer, born 1995) =

Brazilian footballer

Personal information
- Full name: Éder Ferreira Graminho
- Date of birth: 5 April 1995 (age 31)
- Place of birth: Gurupi, Brazil
- Height: 1.84 m (6 ft 1/2 in)
- Position: Centre back

Team information
- Current team: Ceará
- Number: 33

Youth career
- 2009: América Mineiro
- 2010–2015: Bahia

Senior career*
| Years | Team | Apps | (Gls) |
| 2015–2017 | Bahia | 37 | (2) |
| 2018 | Novorizontino | 13 | (1) |
| 2018–2021 | Athletico Paranaense | 13 | (0) |
| 2019 | → Sport Recife (loan) | 11 | (0) |
| 2020–2021 | → Atlético Goianiense (loan) | 38 | (0) |
| 2021 | Atlético Goianiense | 41 | (1) |
| 2022–2024 | América Mineiro | 101 | (2) |
| 2025– | Ceará | 37 | (0) |
- * Club domestic league appearances and goals as of 18 November 2026

Éder Ferreira Graminho (born 5 April 1995), simply known as Éder, is a Brazilian footballer who currently plays as a central defender for Ceará.

== Career ==
=== Bahia ===
Éder made his league debut against Flamengo BA on 11 February 2016. He scored his first goal for the club against Fluminense de Feira on 23 February 2017, scoring in the 30th minute.

=== Novorizontino ===
Éder made his league debut against Mirassol on 17 January 2018. He scored his first goal against Linense on 19 February 2018, scoring in the 30th minute.

=== Athletico Paranaense ===
Éder made his league debut against Cascavel CR on 19 January 2019.

=== Sport Recife ===
Éder made his league debut against CRB on 12 June 2019.

=== Loan to Atlético Goianiense ===
Éder made his league debut against CRAC on 20 February 2020.

=== Atlético Goianiense ===
During his full spell with the club, Éder made his league debut against Anápolis Futebol Clube on 7 March 2021. He scored his first goal for the club against São Paulo on 5 June 2021, scoring in the 23rd minute.

=== América Mineiro ===
Éder made his league debut against EC Democrata on 30 January 2022. He scored his first goal against Tombense on 26 March 2022, scoring in the 75th minute.

== Career statistics ==
As of 1 March 2023

| Club | Season | League | | | State League | | Cup | | Continental | | Other | | Total | |
| Club | Season | Division | Apps | Goals | Apps | Goals | Apps | Goals | Apps | Goals | Apps | Goals | Apps | Goals |
|---|---|---|---|---|---|---|---|---|---|---|---|---|---|---|
| Bahia | 2015 | Série B | 0 | 0 | — | | 1 | 0 | 0 | 0 | 0 | 0 | 1 | 0 |
| Bahia | 2016 | Série B | 9 | 0 | 10 | 0 | 4 | 1 | — | | 7 (Note: Appearance(s) in Copa do Nordeste) | 0 | 30 | 1 |
| Bahia | 2017 | Série A | 9 | 1 | 9 | 1 | 0 | 0 | — | | 7 | 0 | 25 | 2 |
| Bahia | Subtotal | | 18 | 1 | 19 | 1 | 5 | 1 | 0 | 0 | 14 | 0 | 56 | 3 |
| Novorizontino | 2018 | Série D | 0 | 0 | 13 | 1 | — | | — | | — | | 13 | 1 |
| Athletico Paranaense | 2018 | Série A | 0 | 0 | — | | — | | — | | — | | 0 | 0 |
| Athletico Paranaense | 2019 | Série A | 0 | 0 | 13 | 0 | 0 | 0 | 0 | 0 | — | | 13 | 0 |
| Athletico Paranaense | Subtotal | | 0 | 0 | 13 | 0 | 0 | 0 | 0 | 0 | — | | 13 | 0 |
| Sport Recife (loan) | 2019 | Série B | 11 | 0 | — | | — | | — | | — | | 11 | 0 |
| Atlético Goianiense | 2020 | Série A | 32 | 0 | 6 | 0 | 4 | 0 | — | | — | | 42 | 0 |
| Atlético Goianiense | 2021 | Série A | 34 | 1 | 9 | 0 | 6 | 1 | 6 (Note: Appearance(s) in Copa Sudamericana) | 0 | — | | 55 | 2 |
| Atlético Goianiense | Subtotal | | 66 | 1 | 15 | 0 | 10 | 1 | 6 | 0 | — | | 97 | 2 |
| América Mineiro | 2022 | Série A | 33 | 0 | 5 | 1 | 5 | 1 | 9 (Note: Appearance(s) in Copa Libertadores) | 0 | — | | 52 | 2 |
| América Mineiro | 2023 | Série A | 0 | 0 | 3 | 0 | 0 | 0 | 0 | 0 | — | | 3 | 0 |
| América Mineiro | Subtotal | | 33 | 0 | 8 | 1 | 5 | 1 | 9 | 0 | — | | 55 | 2 |
| Career total | | | 128 | 2 | 68 | 3 | 20 | 3 | 15 | 0 | 14 | 0 | 245 | 8 |

== Honours ==
Bahia

- Copa do Nordeste: 2017

Athletico Paranaense

- Campeonato Paranaense: 2019

Atlético Goianiense

- Campeonato Goiano: 2020
