= Estadio Domingo Burgueño =

Multi-use stadium in Maldonado, Uruguay

Estadio Domingo Burgueño Miguel
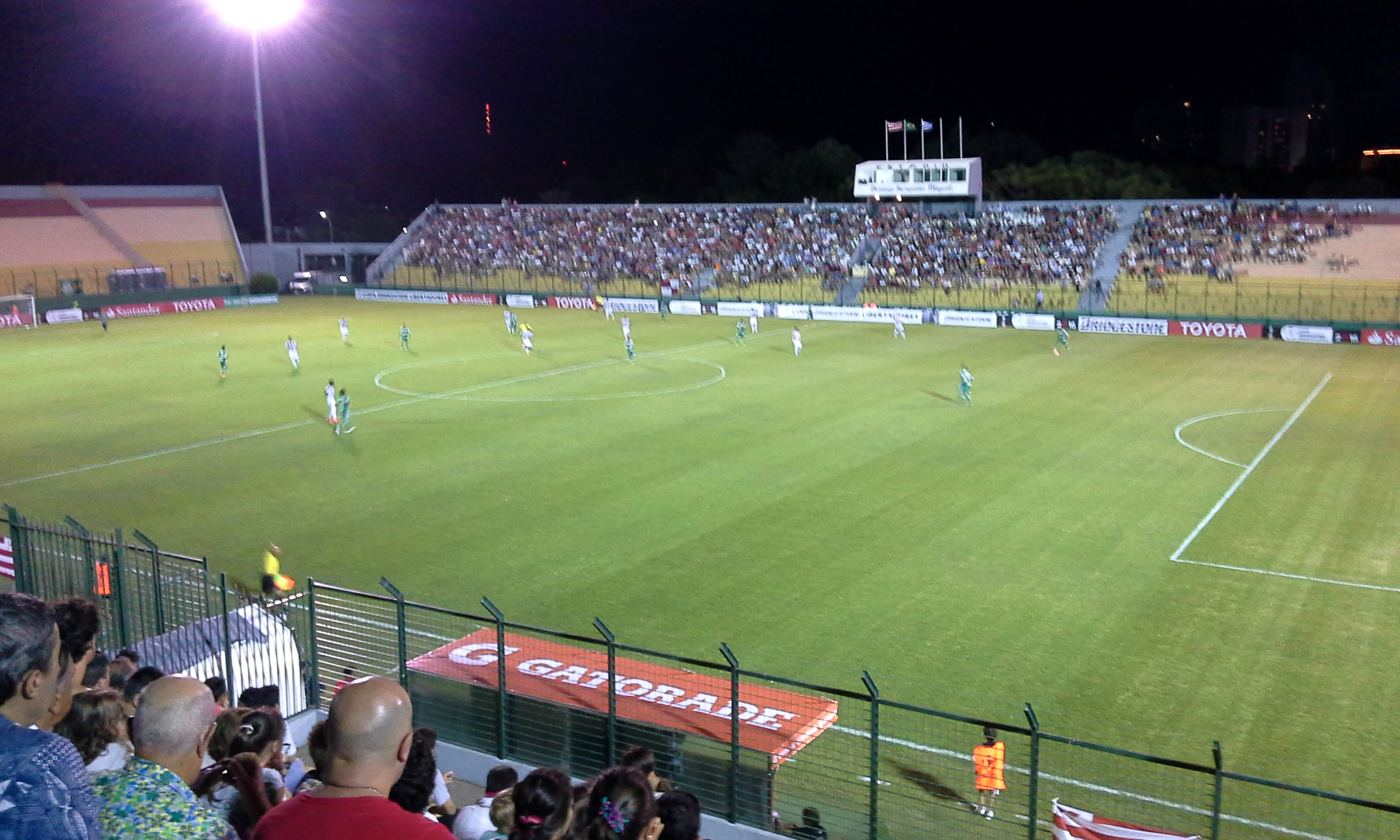
- The stadium during a match in 2016
- Interactive map of Estadio Domingo Burgueño Miguel
- Coordinates: 34°54′52″S 54°57′19″W
- Owner: Maldonado Department
- Capacity: 22,000
- Surface: Grass

Construction
- Opened: 1994; 32 years ago

Tenant
- Deportivo Maldonado Uruguay National Football Team

Estadio Domingo Burgueño is a multi-use stadium in Maldonado, Uruguay. It is used mostly for football matches. The stadium holds 22,000 people and was built in 1994.

It hosted games during the 1995 Copa América, 1999 South American Under-17 Football Championship and 2003 South American Youth Championship, as well as the Punta Del Este Sevens rugby tournament from 1989 to 2014 and later since 2017.

It is home of Deportivo Maldonado in the Uruguayan Primera División. Also, Rocha FC and Atenas de San Carlos have played home matches at the stadium.

Preceded by Estadio Mario Alberto Kempes; Córdoba	Copa Sudamericana; Final Venue; 2023	Succeeded by Estadio General Pablo Rojas; Asunción
