= Emanuel Brítez =

Argentine footballer (born 1992)

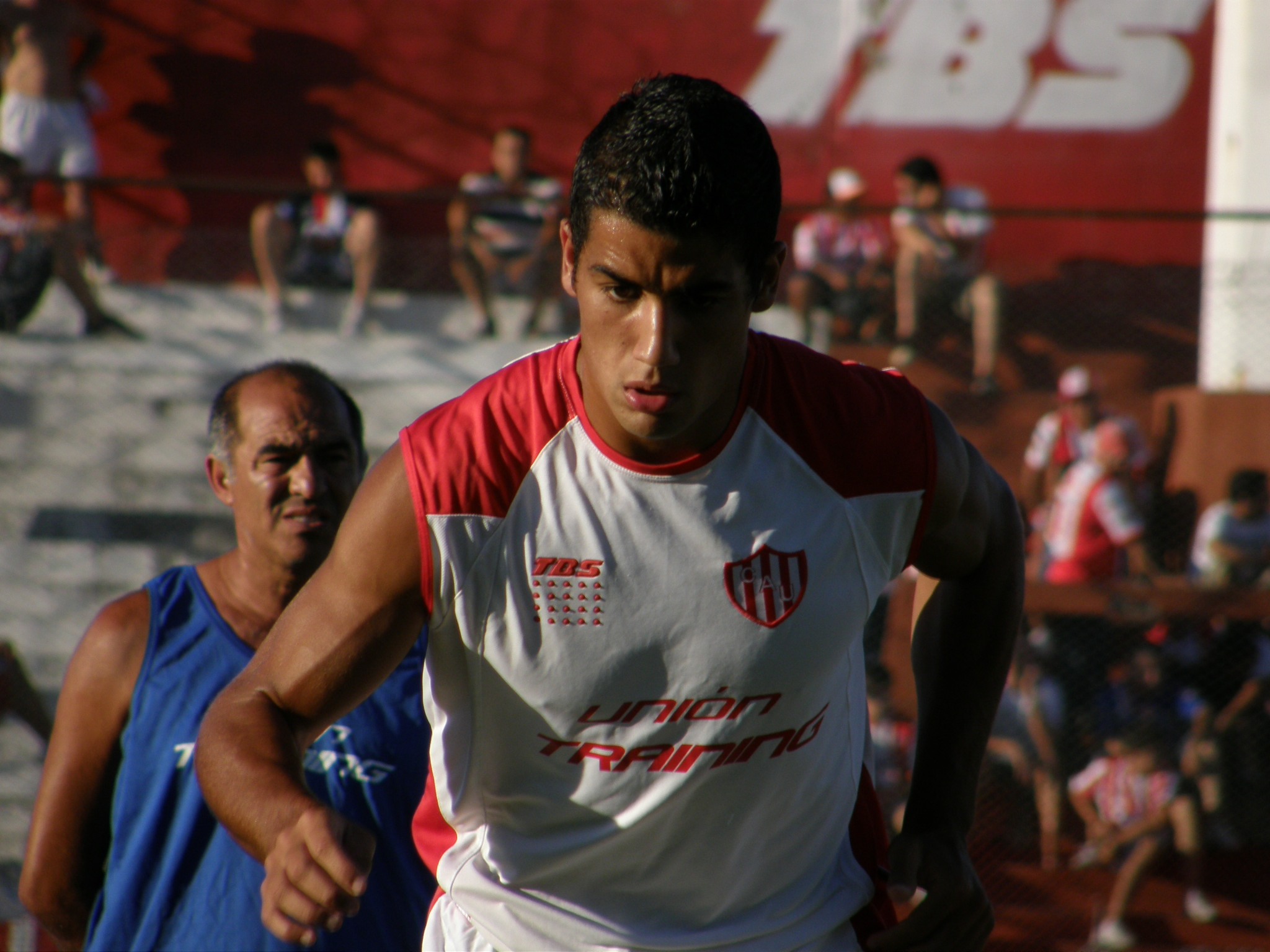
- Emanuel Britez

Personal information
- Date of birth: 26 March 1992 (age 34)
- Place of birth: Santa Fe, Argentina
- Height: 1.78 m (5 ft 10 in)
- Position: Right-back

Team information
- Current team: Vitória
- Number: 2

Youth career
- Unión

Senior career*
Years	Team	Apps	(Gls)
2013–2019	Unión	116	(8)
2018–2019	→ Independiente (loan)	22	(1)
2019–2020	Rosario Central	22	(1)
2020–2021	Defensa y Justicia	12	(0)
2021–2022	Unión	30	(3)
2022–2026	Fortaleza	186	(2)
2026–	Vitória	0	(0)
- * Club domestic league appearances and goals as of 30 May 2026

Emanuel Brítez (born 26 March 1992) is an Argentine professional footballer who plays as a full-back for Vitória.

== Career ==
Brítez has spent his entire career to-date with Unión Santa Fe after coming through the youth ranks at the club. He made his competitive league debut in February 2013 in a 1–1 draw against Arsenal de Sarandí. He went onto make sixteen appearances in his first season with Unión but it ended in disappointment as his side were relegated from the 2012–13 Argentine Primera División. In two seasons in Argentina's second tier, the Primera B Nacional, he participated in forty league fixtures for Unión and scored twice before they were promoted back into the Primera División after winning Zone B in the 2014 Primera B Nacional season.

His first season back in the top-flight (2015) was an eventful one as he played twenty-one times and scored three goals but he also received the first red card of his career in a 5–2 win versus Crucero del Norte on 9 May 2015; he then received a red card in each of his next two seasons: 2016 versus Racing Club de Avellaneda and 2016–17 versus Aldosivi. On 28 December 2017, Brítez agreed to join Independiente on a loan deal commencing January 2018. His first appearance for Independiente came in a draw with Rosario Central on 24 January. In total, he appeared twenty-two times for them across two campaigns; scoring once.

Independiente terminated Brítez's loan on 8 June 2019. On 20 June, Unión Santa Fe announced they had agreed terms with Rosario Central for the transfer of the right-back; subject to personal terms and a medical. The transaction was completed on 21 June.

In late October 2020, Brítez joined Defensa y Justicia on a deal until the end of 2023. Due to lack of playing time, Brítez returned to Unión on a loan deal from Defensa, until the end of 2022.

== Career statistics ==
As of 22 June 2019.

Club statistics
Club	Season	League			Cup		League Cup		Continental		Other		Total	
Club	Season	Division	Apps	Goals	Apps	Goals	Apps	Goals	Apps	Goals	Apps	Goals	Apps	Goals
Unión Santa Fe	2012–13	Primera División	16	0	1	0	—		—		0	0	17	0
Unión Santa Fe	2013–14	Primera B Nacional	25	2	1	0	—		—		0	0	26	2
Unión Santa Fe	2014	Primera B Nacional	15	0	1	0	—		—		0	0	16	0
Unión Santa Fe	2015	Primera División	21	3	1	0	—		—		0	0	22	3
Unión Santa Fe	2016	Primera División	12	1	1	0	—		—		0	0	13	1
Unión Santa Fe	2016–17	Primera División	19	2	3	1	—		—		0	0	22	3
Unión Santa Fe	2017–18	Primera División	8	0	0	0	—		—		0	0	8	0
Unión Santa Fe	2018–19	Primera División	0	0	0	0	0	0	0	0	0	0	0	0
Unión Santa Fe	Total		116	8	8	1	0	0	0	0	0	0	124	9
Independiente (loan)	2017–18	Primera División	6	0	0	0	—		1 (Note: Appearance(s) in the Copa Libertadores)	0	0	0	7	0
Independiente (loan)	2018–19	Primera División	16	1	1	0	2	0	5 (Note: Appearance(s) in the Copa Libertadores and Copa Sudamericana)	0	0	0	24	1
Independiente (loan)	Total		22	1	1	0	2	0	6	0	0	0	31	1
Career total			138	9	9	1	2	0	6	0	0	0	155	10

== Honours ==
Defensa y Justicia

- Copa Sudamericana: 2020
- Recopa Sudamericana: 2021

Fortaleza

- Campeonato Cearense: 2023, 2026
- Copa do Nordeste: 2024
