= Benjamín Rollheiser =

Argentine footballer

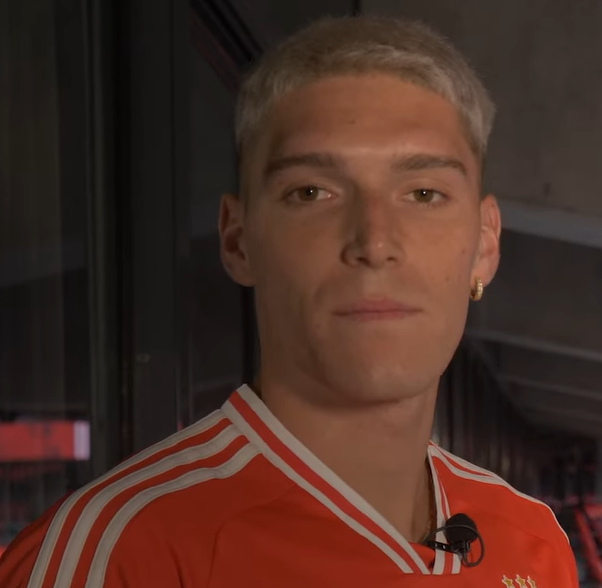
- Rollheiser in 2024

Personal information
- Full name: Benjamín Rollheiser
- Date of birth: 24 March 2000 (age 26)
- Place of birth: Coronel Suárez, Argentina
- Height: 1.75 m (5 ft 9 in)
- Positions: Attacking midfielder; winger

Team information
- Current team: Santos
- Number: 32

Youth career
- 2010–2012: Estudiantes
- 2012–2014: Deportivo Sarmiento
- 2014–2019: River Plate

Senior career*
Years	Team	Apps	(Gls)
2014	Deportivo Sarmiento	8	(1)
2019–2022	River Plate	29	(0)
2022–2024	Estudiantes	61	(7)
2024	→ Benfica (loan)	9	(1)
2024–2025	Benfica	9	(1)
2025–	Santos	75	(7)

International career^{‡}
2017	Argentina U17	3	(0)
2021	Argentina U23	2	(0)
- * Club domestic league appearances and goals as of 17:32, 19 November 2026 (UTC) ‡ National team caps and goals as of 02:26, 2 December 2023 (UTC)

Benjamín Rollheiser (born 24 March 2000) is an Argentine professional footballer who plays for Campeonato Brasileiro Série A club Santos. Mainly an attacking midfielder, he can also play as a right winger.

== Club career ==
=== Early career ===
Rollheiser was spotted while playing for local side Independiente de San José at the age of eight by Carlos Bottegal, a coordinator of Estudiantes, and joined the club in early 2010. He asked to leave the club in 2012 after Bottegal was fired, and returned to his hometown with Deportivo Sarmiento.

Rollheiser made his debut with Sarmiento's first team in 2014, aged 14, scoring once in eight matches. In late 2014, he moved to River Plate's youth categories after a trial period.

=== River Plate ===
After being a part of the first team pre-season under Marcelo Gallardo in 2018, Rollheiser signed a new contract with River on 17 July 2019. He was promoted to the main squad ahead of the 2019–20 campaign, netting in pre-season friendlies in the United States with Ventura County Fusion (twice) and Guadalajara.

On 16 July 2019, Rollheiser made his professional debut by coming on as a second-half substitute for fellow youth graduate Julián Alvarez in a Copa Argentina win over Primera B Nacional side Gimnasia y Esgrima de Mendoza; he provided the assist to Exequiel Palacios' opener in the 1–1 draw, and also converted the decisive spot-kick as River won on penalties. He made his Primera División debut eleven days later, starting in a 1–1 away draw against Argentinos Juniors.

Despite featuring rarely in his first two senior seasons, Rollheiser became a regular option during the 2021 campaign, and scored his first professional goal on 19 December of that year, netting River's third in a 4–0 home routing of Colón in the 2021 Trofeo de Campeones de la Liga Profesional. Ahead of the 2022 season, however, he was separated from the first team squad after not reaching an agreement to renew his contract.

=== Estudiantes ===
On 25 June 2022, after spending the first six months of the year without playing, Rollheiser returned to Estudiantes on a three-year deal. He made his club debut five days later, replacing Franco Zapiola in a 1–1 Copa Libertadores away draw against Fortaleza.

Rollheiser scored his first goal for Estudiantes on 20 July 2022, netting the team's second in a 3–1 home win over Barracas Central. He became a key unit for the side during the 2023 season, helping them to win the 2023 Copa Argentina.

=== Benfica ===
On 20 January 2024, Rollheiser joined Primeira Liga club Benfica on loan until the end of the 2023–24 season, with a subsequent obligation-to-buy, reported to be around €9.5 million for 90% of the player's economic rights. Nine days later, he made his debut for the Lisbon-based side, coming off the bench to replace compatriot Ángel Di María for the final minutes of a 4–1 league victory away at Estrela da Amadora.

Rollheiser scored his first goal abroad on 14 April 2024, netting Benfica's third in a 3–0 home win over Moreirense.

=== Santos ===
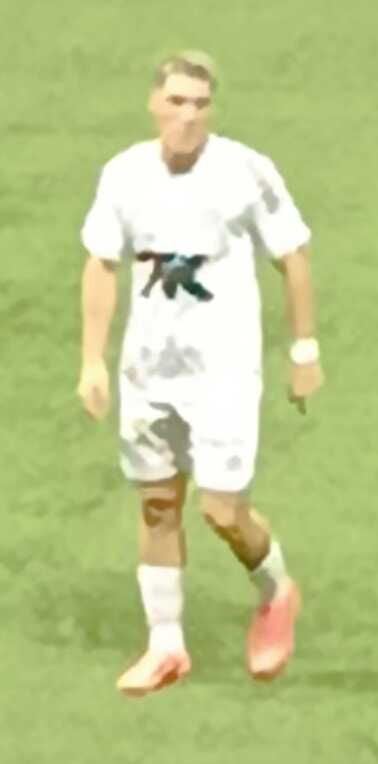
Rollheiser playing for Santos in 2025

On 12 February 2025, Campeonato Brasileiro Série A side Santos announced the signing of Rollheiser on a contract until 2028. He made his club debut on 2 March, replacing Yeferson Soteldo in a 2–0 Campeonato Paulista home win over Red Bull Bragantino.

Rollheiser scored his first goal in Brazil on 1 May 2025, netting the opener in a 1–1 home win over CRB.

== International career ==
Rollheiser represented Argentina at U17 level, notably winning three caps at the 2017 South American Championship in Chile. He has also trained with their senior team.

== Career statistics ==
As of 19 November 2026

Appearances and goals by club, season and competition
Club	Season	League			National cup		Continental		State league		Other		Total	
Club	Season	Division	Apps	Goals	Apps	Goals	Apps	Goals	Apps	Goals	Apps	Goals	Apps	Goals
Deportivo Sarmiento	2014	Torneo Argentino C	8	1	—		—		—		—		8	1
River Plate	2019–20	Argentine Primera División	3	0	1	0	0	0	—		—		4	0
River Plate	2020–21	Argentine Primera División	5	0	0	0	1 (Note: Appearance(s) in Copa Libertadores)	0	—		—		6	0
River Plate	2021	Argentine Primera División	21	0	1	0	1	0	—		1 (Note: Appearance in Trofeo de Campeones de la Liga Profesional)	1	24	1
River Plate	Total		29	0	2	0	2	0	—		1	1	34	1
Estudiantes	2022	Argentine Primera División	21	1	1	0	4	0	—		—		26	1
Estudiantes	2023	Argentine Primera División	40	6	6	0	11 (Note: Appearances in Copa Sudamericana)	6	—		—		57	12
Estudiantes	Total		61	7	7	0	15	6	—		—		83	13
Benfica (loan)	2023–24	Primeira Liga	9	1	0	0	0	0	—		—		9	1
Benfica	2024–25	Primeira Liga	9	1	3	0	6 (Note: Appearances in UEFA Champions League)	0	—		—		18	1
Benfica	Total		18	2	3	0	6	0	—		—		27	2
Santos	2025	Série A	36	2	2	1	—		2 (Note: Appearances in Campeonato Paulista)	0	—		40	3
Santos	2026	Série A	29	4	5	0	11	0	8	1	—		53	5
Santos	Total		65	6	7	1	11	0	10	1	—		93	8
Career total			181	16	19	1	34	6	10	1	1	1	245	25

== Personal life ==
Born in Argentina, Rollheiser is of Volga German and Paraguayan descent.

== Honours ==
River Plate

- Copa Argentina: 2018–19
- Supercopa Argentina: 2019
- Argentine Primera División: 2021
- Trofeo de Campeones: 2021

Estudiantes

- Copa Argentina: 2023

Benfica

- Taça da Liga: 2024–25
