= 2023 Copa Libertadores group stage =

Football tournament stage

The 2023 Copa Libertadores group stage was played from 4 April to 29 June 2023. A total of 32 teams competed in the group stage to decide the 16 places in the final stages of the 2023 Copa Libertadores.

== Draw ==
The draw for the group stage was held on 27 March 2023, 20:00 PYT (UTC−4), at the CONMEBOL Convention Centre in Luque, Paraguay.

Teams were seeded by their CONMEBOL Clubs ranking as of 9 December 2022 (shown in parentheses), taking into account the following three factors:

1. Performance in the last 10 years, taking into account Copa Libertadores and Copa Sudamericana results in the period 2013–2022.
2. Historical coefficient, taking into account Copa Libertadores and Copa Sudamericana results in the period 1960–2012 and 2002–2012 respectively.
3. Local tournament champion, with bonus points awarded to domestic league champions of the last 10 years.

For the group stage, the 32 teams were drawn into eight groups (Groups A–H) of four containing a team from each of the four pots. The defending champions Flamengo were directly assigned as the top seed of Group A (position A1). The remaining teams were distributed into four pots according to their CONMEBOL Clubs ranking. Teams from the same association could not be drawn into the same group, excluding the four winners of the third stage, which were allocated to Pot 4 and could be drawn into the same group with another team from the same association.

Group stage draw
Pot 1	Pot 2	Pot 3	Pot 4
(Brazil) Flamengo (3); (Argentina) River Plate (1); (Brazil) Palmeiras (2); (Argentina) Boca Juniors (4); (Uruguay) Nacional (6); (Brazil) Athletico Paranaense (7); (Ecuador) Independiente del Valle (12); (Paraguay) Olimpia (14)	(Paraguay) Libertad (16); (Colombia) Atlético Nacional (17); (Brazil) Internacional (18); (Ecuador) Barcelona (19); (Argentina) Racing (22); (Brazil) Corinthians (24); (Chile) Colo-Colo (28); (Brazil) Fluminense (32)	(Bolivia) Bolívar (33); (Bolivia) The Strongest (38); (Peru) Melgar (44); (Peru) Alianza Lima (52); (Argentina) Argentinos Juniors (55); (Venezuela) Metropolitanos (97); (Ecuador) Aucas (112); (Venezuela) Monagas (133)	(Uruguay) Liverpool (165); (Colombia) Deportivo Pereira (205); (Chile) Ñublense (230); (Argentina) Patronato (No rank); (Brazil) Atlético Mineiro (11); (Peru) Sporting Cristal (35); (Paraguay) Cerro Porteño (15); (Colombia) Independiente Medellín (54)

Notes

1. ^{TH} The defending Copa Libertadores champions were seeded in Pot 1 and were automatically allocated to Group A and the position A1.
2. ^{CS} The defending Copa Sudamericana champions (normally seeded in Pot 2) were seeded in Pot 1 due to their CONMEBOL Clubs rank.
3. ^{Q3} The third stage winners were seeded in Pot 4.

The following were the four winners of the third stage of qualifying which joined the 28 direct entrants in the group stage.

Match	Third stage winners
G1	(Brazil) Atlético Mineiro
G2	(Peru) Sporting Cristal
G3	(Paraguay) Cerro Porteño
G4	(Colombia) Independiente Medellín

== Format ==
In the group stage, each group was played on a home-and-away round-robin basis. The teams were ranked according to the following criteria: 1. Points (3 points for a win, 1 point for a draw, and 0 points for a loss); 2. Goal difference; 3. Goals scored; 4. Away goals scored; 5. CONMEBOL ranking (Regulations Article 2.4.2).

The winners and runners-up of each group advanced to the round of 16 of the final stages. The third-placed teams of each group entered the knockout round play-offs of the 2023 Copa Sudamericana.

== Schedule ==
The schedule of each matchday was as follows (Regulations Article 2.2.2).

Matchday	Dates	Matches
Matchday 1	4–6 April 2023	Team 4 vs. Team 2, Team 3 vs. Team 1
Matchday 2	18–20 April 2023	Team 2 vs. Team 3, Team 1 vs. Team 4
Matchday 3	2–4 May 2023	Team 2 vs. Team 1, Team 4 vs. Team 3
Matchday 4	23–25 May 2023	Team 3 vs. Team 2, Team 4 vs. Team 1
Matchday 5	6–8 June 2023	Team 1 vs. Team 2, Team 3 vs. Team 4
Matchday 6	27–29 June 2023	Team 1 vs. Team 3, Team 2 vs. Team 4

== Groups ==
=== Group A ===
Pos	Team	Pld	W	D	L	GF	GA	GD	Pts	Qualification	RAC	FLA	ÑUB	AUC
1	(Argentina) Racing	6	4	1	1	13	6	+7	13	Advance to round of 16	—	1–1	4–0	3–2
2	(Brazil) Flamengo	6	3	2	1	11	5	+6	11	Advance to round of 16	2–1	—	2–0	4–0
3	(Chile) Ñublense	6	1	2	3	3	10	−7	5	Transfer to Copa Sudamericana	0–2	1–1	—	2–1
4	(Ecuador) Aucas	6	1	1	4	6	12	−6	4		1–2	2–1	0–0	—

Source: CONMEBOL
5 April 2023
17:00 UTC−5

Aucas (Ecuador)	2–1	(Brazil) Flamengo
Castillo 58'; Ordóñez 85'	Report	França 39'

Estadio Gonzalo Pozo Ripalda, Quito
Attendance: 5,006
Referee: José Argote (Venezuela)
5 April 2023
20:00 UTC−4

Ñublense (Chile)	0–2	(Argentina) Racing
	Report	M. Rojas 16'; Guerrero 54'

Estadio Ester Roa, Concepción (Note: Ñublense played their home matches at Estadio Ester Roa, Concepción instead of their regular stadium Estadio Municipal Nelson Oyarzún Arenas, Chillán which did not meet CONMEBOL requirements.)
Attendance: 11,800
Referee: Bismarks Santiago (Colombia)

19 April 2023
21:30 UTC−3

Flamengo (Brazil)	2–0	(Chile) Ñublense
Pedro 15', 38'	Report

Estádio do Maracanã, Rio de Janeiro
Attendance: 48,895
Referee: Wilmar Roldán (Colombia)
20 April 2023
19:00 UTC−3

Racing (Argentina)	3–2	(Ecuador) Aucas
M. Romero 12'; Nardoni 17'; Ángel 86' (o.g.)	Report	Castillo 48'; Cangá 56'

Estadio Presidente Perón, Avellaneda
Attendance: 15,547
Referee: Cristhian Ferreyra (Uruguay)

2 May 2023
18:00 UTC−4

Ñublense (Chile)	2–1	(Ecuador) Aucas
Rubio 79'; Vilches 90+1'	Report	Otero 24'

Estadio Ester Roa, Concepción
Attendance: 2,813
Referee: Kevin Ortega (Peru)
4 May 2023
19:00 UTC−3

Racing (Argentina)	1–1	(Brazil) Flamengo
Oroz 73'	Report	Gabriel 45+3'

Estadio Presidente Perón, Avellaneda
Attendance: 25,325
Referee: Jesús Valenzuela (Venezuela)

23 May 2023
19:00 UTC−5

Aucas (Ecuador)	1–2	(Argentina) Racing
Otero 90+4'	Report	Reniero 2'; G. Rojas 69'

Estadio Gonzalo Pozo Ripalda, Quito
Attendance: 3,706
Referee: Gery Vargas (Bolivia)
24 May 2023
20:30 UTC−4

Ñublense (Chile)	1–1	(Brazil) Flamengo
Henríquez 72'	Report	Gabriel 34'

Estadio Ester Roa, Concepción
Attendance: 20,000
Referee: Esteban Ostojich (Uruguay)

7 June 2023
19:00 UTC−5

Aucas (Ecuador)	0–0	(Chile) Ñublense
	Report

Estadio Gonzalo Pozo Ripalda, Quito
Attendance: 4,079
Referee: Ángel Arteaga (Venezuela)
8 June 2023
21:00 UTC−3

Flamengo (Brazil)	2–1	(Argentina) Racing
Wesley 36'; Victor Hugo 83'	Report	M. Rojas 49'

Estádio do Maracanã, Rio de Janeiro
Attendance: 63,963
Referee: Gustavo Tejera (Uruguay)

28 June 2023
21:30 UTC−3

Flamengo (Brazil)	4–0	(Ecuador) Aucas
Pedro 9'; Léo Pereira 30'; Bruno Henrique 42'; Victor Hugo 55'	Report

Estádio do Maracanã, Rio de Janeiro
Attendance: 62,924
Referee: Andrés Rojas (Colombia)
28 June 2023
21:30 UTC−3

Racing (Argentina)	4–0	(Chile) Ñublense
M. Rojas 50'; Hauche 54'; Moreno 71'; Piovi 86'	Report

Estadio Presidente Perón, Avellaneda
Attendance: 17,385
Referee: Kevin Ortega (Peru)

=== Group B ===
Pos	Team	Pld	W	D	L	GF	GA	GD	Pts	Qualification	INT	NAC	DIM	MET
1	(Brazil) Internacional	6	3	3	0	10	6	+4	12	Advance to round of 16	—	2–2	3–1	1–0
2	(Uruguay) Nacional	6	3	2	1	9	7	+2	11	Advance to round of 16	1–1	—	2–1	1–0
3	(Colombia) Independiente Medellín	6	3	1	2	10	9	+1	10	Transfer to Copa Sudamericana	1–1	2–1	—	4–2
4	(Venezuela) Metropolitanos	6	0	0	6	4	11	−7	0		1–2	1–2	0–1	—

Source: CONMEBOL
4 April 2023
19:00 UTC−5

Independiente Medellín (Colombia)	1–1	(Brazil) Internacional
Moreno 52'	Report	Alan Patrick 86'

Estadio Atanasio Girardot, Medellín
Attendance: 19,311
Referee: Facundo Tello (Argentina)
4 April 2023
22:00 UTC−4

Metropolitanos (Venezuela)	1–2	(Uruguay) Nacional
Ortiz 52'	Report	Gigliotti 23'; Ginella 90+1'

Estadio Olímpico de la UCV, Caracas
Attendance: 2,536
Referee: Fernando Rapallini (Argentina)

18 April 2023
19:00 UTC−3

Internacional (Brazil)	1–0	(Venezuela) Metropolitanos
Alemão 90+1'	Report

Estádio Beira-Rio, Porto Alegre
Attendance: 27,885
Referee: Yael Falcón Pérez (Argentina)
19 April 2023
19:00 UTC−3

Nacional (Uruguay)	2–1	(Colombia) Independiente Medellín
Pereiro 37'; Noguera 90+6'	Report	Pons 79'

Estadio Gran Parque Central, Montevideo
Attendance: 26,456
Referee: Darío Herrera (Argentina)

3 May 2023
19:00 UTC−3

Internacional (Brazil)	2–2	(Uruguay) Nacional
Mercado 11'; De Pena 83'	Report	Zabala 38'; Noguera 90+1'

Estádio Beira-Rio, Porto Alegre
Attendance: 36,791
Referee: Facundo Tello (Argentina)
3 May 2023
21:00 UTC−5

Independiente Medellín (Colombia)	4–2	(Venezuela) Metropolitanos
Gruezo 1' (o.g.); Cadavid 25'; Monsalve 34'; Pons 45'	Report	Londoño 15' (o.g.); Marchán 90+3'

Estadio Atanasio Girardot, Medellín
Attendance: 18,051
Referee: Cristian Garay (Chile)

23 May 2023
19:00 UTC−5

Independiente Medellín (Colombia)	2–1	(Uruguay) Nacional
Ibargüen 25'; Quiñones 68'	Report	D. Rodríguez 12'

Estadio Atanasio Girardot, Medellín
Attendance: 15,466
Referee: Diego Haro (Peru)
25 May 2023
20:00 UTC−4

Metropolitanos (Venezuela)	1–2	(Brazil) Internacional
Vargas 50'	Report	Alan Patrick 17' (pen.); Luiz Adriano 30'

Estadio Olímpico de la UCV, Caracas
Attendance: 2,385
Referee: Nicolás Lamolina (Argentina)

7 June 2023
19:00 UTC−3

Nacional (Uruguay)	1–1	(Brazil) Internacional
Damiani 89'	Report	Alan Patrick 63'

Estadio Gran Parque Central, Montevideo
Attendance: 29,155
Referee: Darío Herrera (Argentina)
8 June 2023
18:00 UTC−4

Metropolitanos (Venezuela)	0–1	(Colombia) Independiente Medellín
	Report	Batalla 46'

Estadio Olímpico de la UCV, Caracas
Attendance: 2,329
Referee: Maximiliano Ramírez (Argentina)

28 June 2023
19:00 UTC−3

Nacional (Uruguay)	1–0	(Venezuela) Metropolitanos
Polenta 40'	Report

Estadio Gran Parque Central, Montevideo
Attendance: 30,832
Referee: Roberto Pérez (Peru)
28 June 2023
19:00 UTC−3

Internacional (Brazil)	3–1	(Colombia) Independiente Medellín
Maurício 3'; Luiz Adriano 22', 27'	Report	Pons 50'

Estádio Beira-Rio, Porto Alegre
Attendance: 38,567
Referee: Facundo Tello (Argentina)

=== Group C ===
Pos	Team	Pld	W	D	L	GF	GA	GD	Pts	Qualification	PAL	BOL	BSC	CCP
1	(Brazil) Palmeiras	6	5	0	1	16	6	+10	15	Advance to round of 16	—	4–0	4–2	2–1
2	(Bolivia) Bolívar	6	4	0	2	11	7	+4	12	Advance to round of 16	3–1	—	1–0	2–0
3	(Ecuador) Barcelona	6	1	1	4	7	12	−5	4	Transfer to Copa Sudamericana	0–2	2–1	—	2–2
4	(Paraguay) Cerro Porteño	6	1	1	4	5	14	−9	4		0–3	0–4	2–1	—

Source: CONMEBOL
5 April 2023
20:00 UTC−4

Cerro Porteño (Paraguay)	2–1	(Ecuador) Barcelona
Aquino 28' (pen.); Churín 73'	Report	Ortiz 70'

Estadio General Pablo Rojas, Asunción
Attendance: 30,000
Referee: Darío Herrera (Argentina)
5 April 2023
20:30 UTC−4

Bolívar (Bolivia)	3–1	(Brazil) Palmeiras
Hervías 20'; Bejarano 45+1'; Uzeda 89'	Report	López 13'

Estadio Hernando Siles, La Paz
Attendance: 16,178
Referee: Alexis Herrera (Venezuela)

19 April 2023
21:00 UTC−5

Barcelona (Ecuador)	2–1	(Bolivia) Bolívar
Gaibor 37'; Bauman 75'	Report	Ron. Fernández 70'

Estadio Monumental Isidro Romero Carbo, Guayaquil
Attendance: 12,235
Referee: Kevin Ortega (Peru)
20 April 2023
21:00 UTC−3

Palmeiras (Brazil)	2–1	(Paraguay) Cerro Porteño
Gómez 64'; Navarro 76'	Report	Bobadilla 5'

Estádio do Morumbi, São Paulo (Note: Palmeiras played their home match against Cerro Porteño at Estádio do Morumbi, São Paulo instead of their regular stadium Allianz Parque, São Paulo.)
Attendance: 42,340
Referee: Fernando Rapallini (Argentina)

3 May 2023
18:00 UTC−4

Cerro Porteño (Paraguay)	0–4	(Bolivia) Bolívar
	Report	Villamil 18'; Piris Da Motta 23' (o.g.); Bejarano 25'; Rodríguez 49'

Estadio General Pablo Rojas, Asunción
Attendance: 32,630
Referee: Wilmar Roldán (Colombia)
3 May 2023
19:30 UTC−5

Barcelona (Ecuador)	0–2	(Brazil) Palmeiras
	Report	Veiga 45+3' (pen.); Gómez 47'

Estadio Monumental Isidro Romero Carbo, Guayaquil
Attendance: 17,726
Referee: Andrés Rojas (Colombia)

23 May 2023
20:00 UTC−4

Bolívar (Bolivia)	1–0	(Ecuador) Barcelona
Ron. Fernández 90+5'	Report

Estadio Hernando Siles, La Paz
Attendance: 17,000
Referee: Francisco Gilabert (Chile)
24 May 2023 (Note: The Cerro Porteño v Palmeiras match, originally scheduled for 25 May 2023, 20:00 local time, was re-scheduled to 24 May 2023, 18:00 local time.)
18:00 UTC−4

Cerro Porteño (Paraguay)	0–3	(Brazil) Palmeiras
	Report	Artur 25', 58'; Rony 68'

Estadio General Pablo Rojas, Asunción
Attendance: 23,492
Referee: Andrés Matonte (Uruguay)

6 June 2023
22:00 UTC−4

Bolívar (Bolivia)	2–0	(Paraguay) Cerro Porteño
Villamil 5'; Chávez 48'	Report

Estadio Hernando Siles, La Paz
Attendance: 16,281
Referee: Cristian Garay (Chile)
7 June 2023
21:30 UTC−3

Palmeiras (Brazil)	4–2	(Ecuador) Barcelona
Gómez 46'; Piquerez 58'; Artur 70'; Endrick 86'	Report	Fydriszewski 33', 38'

Allianz Parque, São Paulo
Attendance: 33,602
Referee: Andrés Rojas (Colombia)

29 June 2023
21:00 UTC−3

Palmeiras (Brazil)	4–0	(Bolivia) Bolívar
Rony 24'; Artur 34', 85'; Piquerez 76'	Report

Allianz Parque, São Paulo
Attendance: 33,250
Referee: Jesús Valenzuela (Venezuela)
29 June 2023
19:00 UTC−5

Barcelona (Ecuador)	2–2	(Paraguay) Cerro Porteño
Corozo 57'; Bauman 87' (pen.)	Report	Bobadilla 2'; Aquino 43' (pen.)

Estadio Monumental Isidro Romero Carbo, Guayaquil
Attendance: 15,000
Referee: Darío Herrera (Argentina)

=== Group D ===
Pos	Team	Pld	W	D	L	GF	GA	GD	Pts	Qualification	FLU	RIV	CRI	STR
1	(Brazil) Fluminense	6	3	1	2	10	6	+4	10	Advance to round of 16	—	5–1	1–1	1–0
2	(Argentina) River Plate	6	3	1	2	11	11	0	10	Advance to round of 16	2–0	—	4–2	2–0
3	(Peru) Sporting Cristal	6	2	2	2	8	10	−2	8	Transfer to Copa Sudamericana	1–3	1–1	—	1–0
4	(Bolivia) The Strongest	6	2	0	4	5	7	−2	6		1–0	3–1	1–2	—

Source: CONMEBOL
4 April 2023
18:00 UTC−4

The Strongest (Bolivia)	3–1	(Argentina) River Plate
Triverio 25' (pen.), 35'; Castillo 49'	Report	Beltrán 66' (pen.)

Estadio Hernando Siles, La Paz
Attendance: 27,581
Referee: Jesús Valenzuela (Venezuela)
5 April 2023
19:30 UTC−5

Sporting Cristal (Peru)	1–3	(Brazil) Fluminense
Grimaldo 18'	Report	Cano 35', 59'; Mendes 81'

Estadio Nacional, Lima (Note: Sporting Cristal played their home matches at Estadio Nacional, Lima instead of their regular stadium Estadio Alberto Gallardo, Lima which did not meet CONMEBOL requirements.)
Attendance: >30,000
Referee: Wilmar Roldán (Colombia)

18 April 2023
19:00 UTC−3

Fluminense (Brazil)	1–0	(Bolivia) The Strongest
Nino 40'	Report

Estádio do Maracanã, Rio de Janeiro
Attendance: 52,419
Referee: Carlos Ortega (Colombia)
19 April 2023
21:00 UTC−3

River Plate (Argentina)	4–2	(Peru) Sporting Cristal
De la Cruz 18'; Barco 36', 52'; Solari 61'	Report	Ignácio 6'; Corozo 41'

Estadio Monumental, Buenos Aires
Attendance: 62,978
Referee: Jhon Ospina (Colombia)

2 May 2023
21:00 UTC−3

Fluminense (Brazil)	5–1	(Argentina) River Plate
Cano 29', 53', 86'; Arias 75', 90+1'	Report	Beltrán 39'

Estádio do Maracanã, Rio de Janeiro
Attendance: 62,505
Referee: Esteban Ostojich (Uruguay)
2 May 2023
21:00 UTC−5

Sporting Cristal (Peru)	1–0	(Bolivia) The Strongest
Lora 80'	Report

Estadio Nacional, Lima
Attendance: 13,354
Referee: Leodán González (Uruguay)

25 May 2023
18:00 UTC−4

The Strongest (Bolivia)	1–0	(Brazil) Fluminense
Triverio 4'	Report

Estadio Hernando Siles, La Paz
Attendance: >30,000
Referee: Felipe González (Chile)
25 May 2023
19:00 UTC−5

Sporting Cristal (Peru)	1–1	(Argentina) River Plate
Yotún 63'	Report	Aliendro 84'

Estadio Nacional, Lima
Attendance: 34,374
Referee: Cristian Garay (Chile)

7 June 2023
21:30 UTC−3

River Plate (Argentina)	2–0	(Brazil) Fluminense
Beltrán 49'; Barco 90+7' (pen.)	Report

Estadio Monumental, Buenos Aires
Attendance: 66,362
Referee: Wilmar Roldán (Colombia)
7 June 2023
22:00 UTC−4

The Strongest (Bolivia)	1–2	(Peru) Sporting Cristal
Triverio 13'	Report	Brenner 23'; Corozo 80'

Estadio Hernando Siles, La Paz
Attendance: 15,571
Referee: Esteban Ostojich (Uruguay)

27 June 2023
21:00 UTC−3

River Plate (Argentina)	2–0	(Bolivia) The Strongest
Aliendro 13'; Borja 90'	Report

Estadio Monumental, Buenos Aires
Attendance: 62,910
Referee: Gustavo Tejera (Uruguay)
27 June 2023
21:00 UTC−3

Fluminense (Brazil)	1–1	(Peru) Sporting Cristal
Cano 22'	Report	Brenner 37'

Estádio do Maracanã, Rio de Janeiro
Attendance: 50,683
Referee: Piero Maza (Chile)

=== Group E ===
Pos	Team	Pld	W	D	L	GF	GA	GD	Pts	Qualification	IDV	ARG	COR	LIV
1	(Ecuador) Independiente del Valle	6	4	0	2	10	5	+5	12	Advance to round of 16	—	3–2	3–0	2–0
2	(Argentina) Argentinos Juniors	6	3	2	1	8	6	+2	11	Advance to round of 16	1–0	—	0–0	2–1
3	(Brazil) Corinthians	6	2	1	3	7	6	+1	7	Transfer to Copa Sudamericana	1–2	0–1	—	3–0
4	(Uruguay) Liverpool	6	1	1	4	4	12	−8	4		1–0	2–2	0–3	—

Source: CONMEBOL
4 April 2023
19:00 UTC−3

Argentinos Juniors (Argentina)	1–0	(Ecuador) Independiente del Valle
Cabrera 46'	Report

Estadio Diego Armando Maradona, Buenos Aires
Attendance: 8,673
Referee: Diego Haro (Peru)
6 April 2023
19:00 UTC−3

Liverpool (Uruguay)	0–3	(Brazil) Corinthians
	Report	Balbuena 45+1'; Guedes 49', 63'

Estadio Centenario, Montevideo (Note: Liverpool played their home matches at Estadio Centenario, Montevideo instead of their regular stadium Estadio Belvedere, Montevideo which did not meet CONMEBOL requirements.)
Attendance: 2,348
Referee: Andrés Rojas (Colombia)

18 April 2023
21:00 UTC−5

Independiente del Valle (Ecuador)	2–0	(Uruguay) Liverpool
Sornoza 27'; Minda 67'	Report

Estadio Banco Guayaquil, Quito
Attendance: 2,198
Referee: Ángel Arteaga (Venezuela)
19 April 2023
21:30 UTC−3

Corinthians (Brazil)	0–1	(Argentina) Argentinos Juniors
	Report	Cabrera 13'

Neo Química Arena, São Paulo
Attendance: 40,670
Referee: Jesús Valenzuela (Venezuela)

2 May 2023
19:00 UTC−3

Liverpool (Uruguay)	2–2	(Argentina) Argentinos Juniors
Bentancourt 48', 76'	Report	González Metilli 45+1'; Torrén 60' (pen.)

Estadio Centenario, Montevideo
Attendance: 3,134
Referee: Ivo Méndez (Bolivia)
2 May 2023
21:00 UTC−3

Corinthians (Brazil)	1–2	(Ecuador) Independiente del Valle
Guedes 35'	Report	Díaz 22', 52'

Neo Química Arena, São Paulo
Attendance: 39,984
Referee: Piero Maza (Chile)

24 May 2023
19:00 UTC−3

Liverpool (Uruguay)	1–0	(Ecuador) Independiente del Valle
Bentancourt 65'	Report

Estadio Centenario, Montevideo
Attendance: 835
Referee: Jhon Hinestroza (Colombia)
24 May 2023
21:30 UTC−3

Argentinos Juniors (Argentina)	0–0	(Brazil) Corinthians
	Report

Estadio Diego Armando Maradona, Buenos Aires
Attendance: 21,830
Referee: Carlos Ortega (Colombia)

7 June 2023
19:00 UTC−3

Argentinos Juniors (Argentina)	2–1	(Uruguay) Liverpool
Heredia 61'; Villalba 90+5'	Report	Bentancourt 50' (pen.)

Estadio Diego Armando Maradona, Buenos Aires
Attendance: 1,136
Referee: Roberto Pérez (Peru)
7 June 2023 (Note: The Independiente del Valle v Corinthians match, originally scheduled for 8 June 2023, 17:00 local time, was re-scheduled to 7 June 2023 at the same time.)
17:00 UTC−5

Independiente del Valle (Ecuador)	3–0	(Brazil) Corinthians
Hoyos 17', 24'; Sornoza 69'	Report

Estadio Banco Guayaquil, Quito
Attendance: 4,563
Referee: Alexis Herrera (Venezuela)

28 June 2023
19:30 UTC−5

Independiente del Valle (Ecuador)	3–2	(Argentina) Argentinos Juniors
Faravelli 23'; Díaz 48'; Rodríguez 90'	Report	Carabajal 44' (o.g.); Heredia 87'

Estadio Banco Guayaquil, Quito
Attendance: 4,033
Referee: Wilmar Roldán (Colombia)
28 June 2023
21:30 UTC−3

Corinthians (Brazil)	3–0	(Uruguay) Liverpool
Araújo 32'; Felipe Augusto 64'; Adson 80'	Report

Neo Química Arena, São Paulo
Attendance: 26,556
Referee: Ángel Arteaga (Venezuela)

=== Group F ===
Pos	Team	Pld	W	D	L	GF	GA	GD	Pts	Qualification	BOC	PER	CCL	MON
1	(Argentina) Boca Juniors	6	4	1	1	9	2	+7	13	Advance to round of 16	—	2–1	1–0	4–0
2	(Colombia) Deportivo Pereira	6	2	2	2	5	5	0	8	Advance to round of 16	1–0	—	1–1	2–1
3	(Chile) Colo-Colo	6	1	3	2	3	5	−2	6	Transfer to Copa Sudamericana	0–2	0–0	—	1–0
4	(Venezuela) Monagas	6	1	2	3	3	8	−5	5		0–0	1–0	1–1	—

Source: CONMEBOL
5 April 2023
21:00 UTC−5

Deportivo Pereira (Colombia)	1–1	(Chile) Colo-Colo
Án. Rodríguez 81'	Report	Gil 24' (pen.)

Estadio Hernán Ramírez Villegas, Pereira
Attendance: 25,000
Referee: Raphael Claus (Brazil)
6 April 2023
20:00 UTC−4

Monagas (Venezuela)	0–0	(Argentina) Boca Juniors
	Report

Estadio Monumental, Maturín
Attendance: 40,127
Referee: Wilton Sampaio (Brazil)

18 April 2023
21:00 UTC−3

Boca Juniors (Argentina)	2–1	(Colombia) Deportivo Pereira
Advíncula 89'; Varela 90+9'	Report	Fory 76'

Estadio Alberto J. Armando, Buenos Aires
Attendance: 40,200
Referee: Andrés Matonte (Uruguay)
19 April 2023
21:00 UTC−4 (Note: The Colo-Colo v Monagas match, originally scheduled for 19 April 2023, 20:00 local time, was re-scheduled to 21:00 local time.)

Colo-Colo (Chile)	1–0	(Venezuela) Monagas
Palacios 45+6' (pen.)	Report

Estadio Monumental David Arellano, Santiago
Attendance: 28,671
Referee: Anderson Daronco (Brazil)

3 May 2023
20:00 UTC−4

Colo-Colo (Chile)	0–2	(Argentina) Boca Juniors
	Report	Advíncula 13'; Villa 65'

Estadio Monumental David Arellano, Santiago
Attendance: 21,310
Referee: Raphael Claus (Brazil)
4 May 2023
21:00 UTC−5

Deportivo Pereira (Colombia)	2–1	(Venezuela) Monagas
Ramírez 20' (pen.); Fory 41'	Report	Martínez 65'

Estadio Hernán Ramírez Villegas, Pereira
Attendance: 11,849
Referee: Ramon Abatti (Brazil)

23 May 2023
18:00 UTC−4

Monagas (Venezuela)	1–1	(Chile) Colo-Colo
Ramírez 62'	Report	Bolados 86'

Estadio Monumental, Maturín
Attendance: 24,930
Referee: Bráulio Machado (Brazil)
24 May 2023
19:00 UTC−5

Deportivo Pereira (Colombia)	1–0	(Argentina) Boca Juniors
Ar. Rodríguez 78'	Report

Estadio Hernán Ramírez Villegas, Pereira
Attendance: 35,000
Referee: Wagner Magalhães (Brazil)

6 June 2023
18:00 UTC−4

Monagas (Venezuela)	1–0	(Colombia) Deportivo Pereira
Navas 19' (pen.)	Report

Estadio Monumental, Maturín
Attendance: 23,100
Referee: Alex Cajas (Ecuador)
6 June 2023
21:00 UTC−3

Boca Juniors (Argentina)	1–0	(Chile) Colo-Colo
Weigandt 55'	Report

Estadio Alberto J. Armando, Buenos Aires
Attendance: 43,700
Referee: Anderson Daronco (Brazil)

29 June 2023
19:00 UTC−3

Boca Juniors (Argentina)	4–0	(Venezuela) Monagas
Weigandt 39'; Barco 61'; Vázquez 86', 89'	Report

Estadio Alberto J. Armando, Buenos Aires
Attendance: 40,564
Referee: Andrés Matonte (Uruguay)
29 June 2023
18:00 UTC−4

Colo-Colo (Chile)	0–0	(Colombia) Deportivo Pereira
	Report

Estadio Monumental David Arellano, Santiago
Attendance: 38,130
Referee: Wilton Sampaio (Brazil)

=== Group G ===
Pos	Team	Pld	W	D	L	GF	GA	GD	Pts	Qualification	CAP	CAM	LIB	ALI
1	(Brazil) Athletico Paranaense	6	4	1	1	9	4	+5	13	Advance to round of 16	—	2–1	1–0	3–0
2	(Brazil) Atlético Mineiro	6	3	1	2	7	5	+2	10	Advance to round of 16	2–1	—	0–1	2–0
3	(Paraguay) Libertad	6	2	1	3	6	7	−1	7	Transfer to Copa Sudamericana	1–2	1–1	—	1–2
4	(Peru) Alianza Lima	6	1	1	4	3	9	−6	4		0–0	0–1	1–2	—

Source: CONMEBOL
4 April 2023
17:00 UTC−5

Alianza Lima (Peru)	0–0	(Brazil) Athletico Paranaense
	Report

Estadio Alejandro Villanueva, Lima
Attendance: 30,000
Referee: Carlos Ortega (Colombia)
6 April 2023
19:00 UTC−3

Atlético Mineiro (Brazil)	0–1	(Paraguay) Libertad
	Report	Gómez 9'

Mineirão, Belo Horizonte
Attendance: 40,177
Referee: Yael Falcón Pérez (Argentina)

18 April 2023
21:00 UTC−3

Athletico Paranaense (Brazil)	2–1	(Brazil) Atlético Mineiro
Vitor Roque 7'; Terans 35' (pen.)	Report	Paulinho 70'

Arena da Baixada, Curitiba
Attendance: 27,401
Referee: Pablo Echavarría (Argentina)
20 April 2023
22:00 UTC−4

Libertad (Paraguay)	1–2	(Peru) Alianza Lima
Cardozo 90+4' (pen.)	Report	Rodríguez 46'; Sabbag 71'

Estadio Defensores del Chaco, Asunción (Note: Libertad played their home matches at Estadio Defensores del Chaco, Asunción instead of their regular stadium Estadio Tigo La Huerta, Asunción.)
Attendance: 2,909
Referee: Facundo Tello (Argentina)

3 May 2023
21:30 UTC−3

Atlético Mineiro (Brazil)	2–0	(Peru) Alianza Lima
Gomes 59', 68'	Report

Arena Independência, Belo Horizonte (Note: Atlético Mineiro played their home match against Alianza Lima at Arena Independência, Belo Horizonte instead of their regular stadium Mineirão, Belo Horizonte due to the poor condition of the pitch.)
Attendance: 17,563
Referee: Andrés Matonte (Uruguay)
4 May 2023
20:00 UTC−4

Libertad (Paraguay)	1–2	(Brazil) Athletico Paranaense
Cardozo 10'	Report	Rômulo 52'; Santana 65'

Estadio Defensores del Chaco, Asunción
Referee: Jhon Ospina (Colombia)

23 May 2023
19:00 UTC−3

Atlético Mineiro (Brazil)	2–1	(Brazil) Athletico Paranaense
Paulinho 68', 87'	Report	Santana 51'

Mineirão, Belo Horizonte
Attendance: 39,683
Referee: Wilmar Roldán (Colombia)
23 May 2023
21:00 UTC−5

Alianza Lima (Peru)	1–2	(Paraguay) Libertad
Vílchez 90+3'	Report	García 45+2' (o.g.); Melgarejo 55'

Estadio Alejandro Villanueva, Lima
Attendance: 29,299
Referee: Fernando Rapallini (Argentina)

6 June 2023
19:00 UTC−3

Athletico Paranaense (Brazil)	1–0	(Paraguay) Libertad
Christian 72'	Report

Arena da Baixada, Curitiba
Attendance: 26,714
Referee: Gery Vargas (Bolivia)
6 June 2023
19:00 UTC−5

Alianza Lima (Peru)	0–1	(Brazil) Atlético Mineiro
	Report	Hulk 62'

Estadio Alejandro Villanueva, Lima
Attendance: 23,554
Referee: Facundo Tello (Argentina)

27 June 2023
19:00 UTC−3

Athletico Paranaense (Brazil)	3–0	(Peru) Alianza Lima
Bueno 8'; Vitor Roque 63', 88'	Report

Arena da Baixada, Curitiba
Attendance: 24,467
Referee: Alexis Herrera (Venezuela)
27 June 2023
18:00 UTC−4

Libertad (Paraguay)	1–1	(Brazil) Atlético Mineiro
Bareiro 61'	Report	Gomes 68'

Estadio Defensores del Chaco, Asunción
Referee: Fernando Rapallini (Argentina)

=== Group H ===
Pos	Team	Pld	W	D	L	GF	GA	GD	Pts	Qualification	OLI	ATN	PAT	MEL
1	(Paraguay) Olimpia	6	4	2	0	13	4	+9	14	Advance to round of 16	—	3–0	1–0	4–1
2	(Colombia) Atlético Nacional	6	3	1	2	8	8	0	10	Advance to round of 16	2–2	—	0–1	3–1
3	(Argentina) Patronato	6	2	0	4	6	11	−5	6	Transfer to Copa Sudamericana	0–2	1–2	—	4–1
4	(Peru) Melgar	6	1	1	4	9	13	−4	4		1–1	0–1	5–0	—

Source: CONMEBOL
5 April 2023
19:00 UTC−3

Patronato (Argentina)	1–2	(Colombia) Atlético Nacional
Levato 2'	Report	Pabón 77' (pen.), 79'

Estadio Brigadier General Estanislao López, Santa Fe (Note: Patronato played their home match against Atlético Nacional at Estadio Brigadier General Estanislao López, Santa Fe instead of their regular stadium Estadio Presbítero Bartolomé Grella, Paraná which did not meet CONMEBOL requirements.)
Attendance: 20,000
Referee: Wagner Magalhães (Brazil)
6 April 2023
19:00 UTC−5

Melgar (Peru)	1–1	(Paraguay) Olimpia
Cuesta 20'	Report	Paiva 14'

Estadio Monumental de la UNSA, Arequipa
Attendance: 13,684
Referee: Anderson Daronco (Brazil)

18 April 2023
20:00 UTC−4

Olimpia (Paraguay)	1–0	(Argentina) Patronato
Cardozo 44'	Report

Estadio Defensores del Chaco, Asunción (Note: Olimpia played their home matches against Patronato and Atlético Nacional at Estadio Defensores del Chaco, Asunción instead of their regular stadium Estadio Manuel Ferreira, Asunción.)
Attendance: 13,983
Referee: Raphael Claus (Brazil)
20 April 2023
19:00 UTC−5

Atlético Nacional (Colombia)	3–1	(Peru) Melgar
Pabón 28', 38' (pen.), 59'	Report	Iberico 57'

Estadio Metropolitano Roberto Meléndez, Barranquilla (Note: The Atlético Nacional v Melgar match was played at Estadio Metropolitano Roberto Meléndez, Barranquilla instead of Atlético Nacional's regular stadium Estadio Atanasio Girardot, Medellín due to lack of security guarantees. Furthermore, it was played behind closed doors.)
Attendance: 0
Referee: Wilton Sampaio (Brazil)

2 May 2023
19:00 UTC−5

Atlético Nacional (Colombia)	2–2	(Paraguay) Olimpia
Pabón 26'; Devenish 65'	Report	Cardozo 48'; Bruera 78'

Estadio Atanasio Girardot, Medellín
Attendance: 25,623
Referee: Anderson Daronco (Brazil)
4 May 2023
19:00 UTC−3

Patronato (Argentina)	4–1	(Peru) Melgar
Esquivel 4', 70'; Ojeda 59'; Levato 86'	Report	Martínez 53'

Estadio Presbítero Bartolomé Grella, Paraná (Note: Patronato played their home match against Melgar (originally scheduled at Estadio Brigadier General Estanislao López, Santa Fe) at their regular stadium Estadio Presbítero Bartolomé Grella, Paraná after it was able to meet CONMEBOL requirements.)
Attendance: 5,734
Referee: Gery Vargas (Bolivia)

24 May 2023
21:00 UTC−5

Melgar (Peru)	0–1	(Colombia) Atlético Nacional
	Report	Banguero 88'

Estadio Monumental de la UNSA, Arequipa
Referee: Edina Alves (Brazil)
25 May 2023 (Note: The Patronato v Olimpia match scheduled for 24 May 2023, 19:00 local time at Estadio Presbítero Bartolomé Grella, Paraná was rescheduled to 25 May 2023 at Estadio Brigadier General Estanislao López, Santa Fe due to heavy rainfall.)
19:00 UTC−3

Patronato (Argentina)	0–2	(Paraguay) Olimpia
	Report	I. Torres 9'; D. Torres 76'

Estadio Brigadier General Estanislao López, Santa Fe
Attendance: 4,587
Referee: Jesús Valenzuela (Venezuela)

6 June 2023
19:00 UTC−5

Melgar (Peru)	5–0	(Argentina) Patronato
Cuesta 8' (pen.), 41'; Bordacahar 13'; Martínez 22' (pen.); D'Arrigo 58'	Report

Estadio Monumental de la UNSA, Arequipa
Attendance: 4,900
Referee: Bruno Arleu (Brazil)
8 June 2023
20:00 UTC−4

Olimpia (Paraguay)	3–0	(Colombia) Atlético Nacional
Gamarra 19'; Paiva 50'; D. Torres 90'	Report

Estadio Defensores del Chaco, Asunción
Attendance: 30,891
Referee: Wilton Sampaio (Brazil)

27 June 2023
20:00 UTC−4

Olimpia (Paraguay)	4–1	(Peru) Melgar
Silva 2' (pen.); Paiva 9', 23'; Cardozo 31'	Report	Martínez 54'

Estadio Manuel Ferreira, Asunción
Referee: Raphael Claus (Brazil)
27 June 2023
19:00 UTC−5

Atlético Nacional (Colombia)	0–1	(Argentina) Patronato
	Report	C. González 81'

Estadio Atanasio Girardot, Medellín
Attendance: 14,283
Referee: Paulo Zanovelli (Brazil)
