= 2023 Copa Libertadores =

64th Copa Libertadores edition

Copa CONMEBOL Libertadores 2023
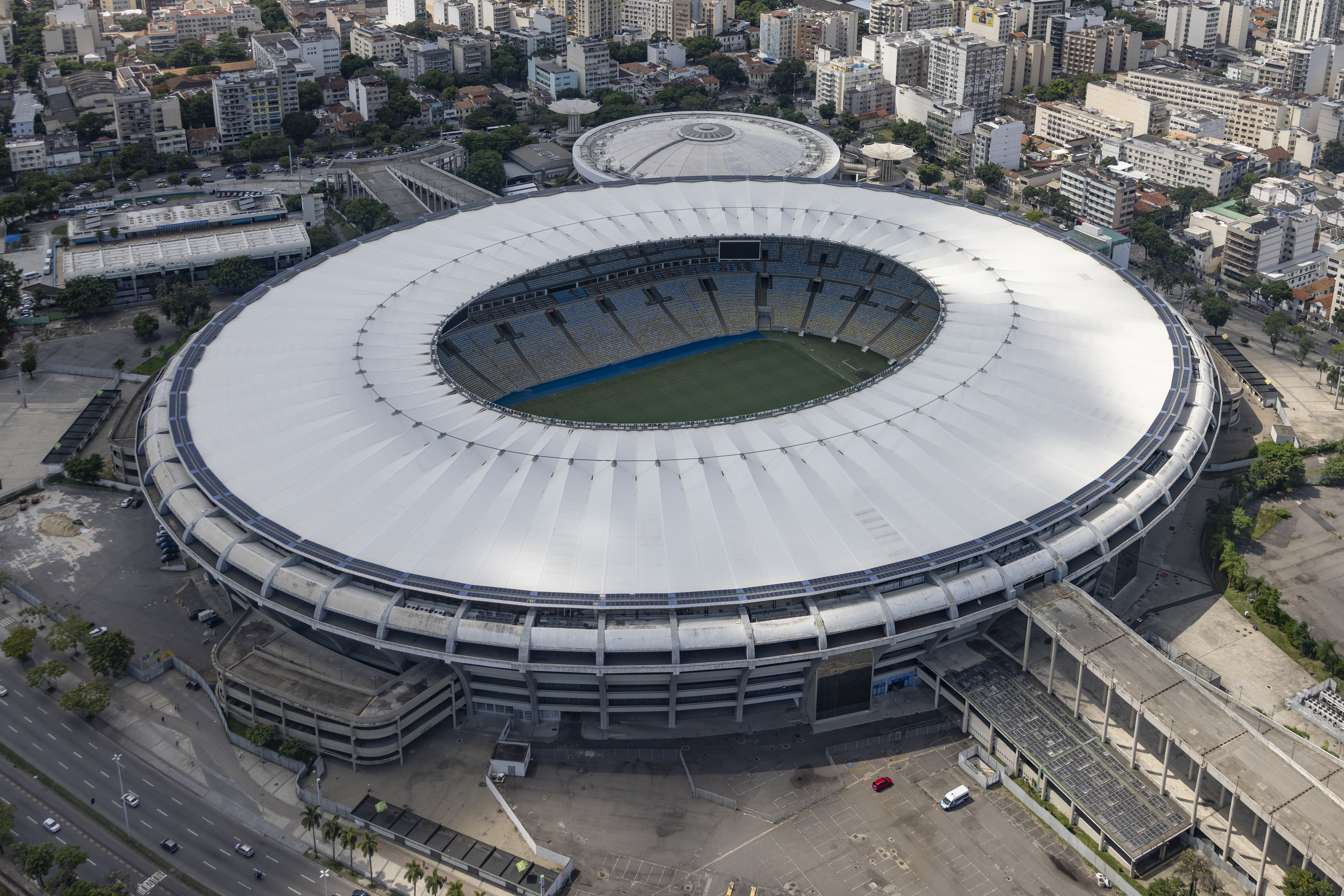
- The Estádio do Maracanã in Rio de Janeiro hosted the final

Tournament details
- Dates: 7 February – 4 November 2023
- Teams: 47 (from 10 associations)

Final positions
- Champions: (Brazil) Fluminense (1st title)
- Runners-up: (Argentina) Boca Juniors

Tournament statistics
- Matches played: 155
- Goals scored: 386 (2.49 per match)
- Attendance: 3,879,523 (25,029 per match)
- Top scorer: (Argentina) Germán Cano (13 goals)

The 2023 Copa CONMEBOL Libertadores was the 64th edition of the CONMEBOL Libertadores (also referred to as the Copa Libertadores), South America's premier club football tournament organized by CONMEBOL.

The final was played at the Estádio do Maracanã in Rio de Janeiro, Brazil on 4 November 2023. Brazilian club Fluminense were the champions, winning their first Copa Libertadores title after defeating Argentine side Boca Juniors 2–1 after extra time in the final. As winners of the 2023 Copa Libertadores, Fluminense earned the right to play against the winners of the 2023 Copa Sudamericana in the 2024 Recopa Sudamericana. They also automatically qualified for the 2023 and 2025 FIFA Club World Cups and the 2024 Copa Libertadores group stage.

Flamengo were the defending champions, but were eliminated by Olimpia in the round of 16.

== Teams ==
The following 47 teams from the 10 CONMEBOL member associations qualified for the tournament:

- Copa Libertadores champions
- Copa Sudamericana champions
- Brazil: 7 berths
- Argentina: 6 berths
- All other associations: 4 berths each

The entry stage was determined as follows:

- Group stage: 28 teams
  - Copa Libertadores champions
  - Copa Sudamericana champions
  - Teams which qualified for berths 1–5 from Argentina and Brazil
  - Teams which qualified for berths 1–2 from all other associations
- Second stage: 13 teams
  - Teams which qualified for berths 6–7 from Brazil
  - Team which qualified for berth 6 from Argentina
  - Teams which qualified for berths 3–4 from Chile and Colombia
  - Teams which qualified for berth 3 from all other associations
- First stage: 6 teams
  - Teams which qualified for berth 4 from Bolivia, Ecuador, Paraguay, Peru, Uruguay and Venezuela

Association	Team (Berth)	Entry stage	Qualification method
Argentina (6 berths)	Boca Juniors (Argentina 1)	Group stage	2022 Liga Profesional de Fútbol champions
Argentina (6 berths)	Racing (Argentina 2)	Group stage	2022 Copa de la Liga Profesional and Liga Profesional de Fútbol aggregate table best team not yet qualified
Argentina (6 berths)	Patronato (Argentina 3)	Group stage	2022 Copa Argentina champions
Argentina (6 berths)	River Plate (Argentina 4)	Group stage	2022 Copa de la Liga Profesional and Liga Profesional de Fútbol aggregate table 2nd best team not yet qualified
Argentina (6 berths)	Argentinos Juniors (Argentina 5)	Group stage	2022 Copa de la Liga Profesional and Liga Profesional de Fútbol aggregate table 3rd best team not yet qualified
Argentina (6 berths)	Huracán (Argentina 6)	Second stage	2022 Copa de la Liga Profesional and Liga Profesional de Fútbol aggregate table 4th best team not yet qualified
Bolivia (4 berths)	Bolívar (Bolivia 1)	Group stage	2022 Apertura champions
Bolivia (4 berths)	The Strongest (Bolivia 2)	Group stage	2022 División Profesional aggregate table best team not yet qualified
Bolivia (4 berths)	Always Ready (Bolivia 3)	Second stage	2022 División Profesional aggregate table 2nd best team not yet qualified
Bolivia (4 berths)	Nacional Potosí (Bolivia 4)	First stage	2022 División Profesional aggregate table 3rd best team not yet qualified
Brazil (7 + 1 berths)	Flamengo (Title holders)	Group stage	2022 Copa Libertadores champions
Brazil (7 + 1 berths)	Palmeiras (Brazil 1)	Group stage	2022 Campeonato Brasileiro Série A champions
Brazil (7 + 1 berths)	Internacional (Brazil 2)	Group stage	2022 Campeonato Brasileiro Série A runners-up
Brazil (7 + 1 berths)	Fluminense (Brazil 3)	Group stage	2022 Campeonato Brasileiro Série A 3rd place
Brazil (7 + 1 berths)	Corinthians (Brazil 4)	Group stage	2022 Campeonato Brasileiro Série A 4th place
Brazil (7 + 1 berths)	Athletico Paranaense (Brazil 5)	Group stage	2022 Campeonato Brasileiro Série A 6th place
Brazil (7 + 1 berths)	Atlético Mineiro (Brazil 6)	Second stage	2022 Campeonato Brasileiro Série A 7th place
Brazil (7 + 1 berths)	Fortaleza (Brazil 7)	Second stage	2022 Campeonato Brasileiro Série A 8th place
Chile (4 berths)	Colo-Colo (Chile 1)	Group stage	2022 Campeonato Nacional champions
Chile (4 berths)	Ñublense (Chile 2)	Group stage	2022 Campeonato Nacional runners-up
Chile (4 berths)	Curicó Unido (Chile 3)	Second stage	2022 Campeonato Nacional 3rd place
Chile (4 berths)	Magallanes (Chile 4)	Second stage	2022 Copa Chile champions
Colombia (4 berths)	Atlético Nacional (Colombia 1)	Group stage	2022 Apertura champions
Colombia (4 berths)	Deportivo Pereira (Colombia 2)	Group stage	2022 Finalización champions
Colombia (4 berths)	Independiente Medellín (Colombia 3)	Second stage	2022 Primera A aggregate table best team not yet qualified
Colombia (4 berths)	Millonarios (Colombia 4)	Second stage	2022 Copa Colombia champions
Ecuador (4 + 1 berths)	Independiente del Valle (Copa Sudamericana)	Group stage	2022 Copa Sudamericana champions
Ecuador (4 + 1 berths)	Aucas (Ecuador 1)	Group stage	2022 Serie A champions
Ecuador (4 + 1 berths)	Barcelona (Ecuador 2)	Group stage	2022 Serie A runners-up
Ecuador (4 + 1 berths)	Universidad Católica (Ecuador 3)	Second stage	2022 Serie A aggregate table best team not yet qualified
Ecuador (4 + 1 berths)	El Nacional (Ecuador 4)	First stage	2022 Copa Ecuador 3rd place
Paraguay (4 berths)	Olimpia (Paraguay 1)	Group stage	2022 División de Honor tournament (Apertura or Clausura) champions with better record in aggregate table
Paraguay (4 berths)	Libertad (Paraguay 2)	Group stage	2022 División de Honor (Apertura or Clausura) champions with worse record in aggregate table
Paraguay (4 berths)	Cerro Porteño (Paraguay 3)	Second stage	2022 División de Honor aggregate table best team not yet qualified
Paraguay (4 berths)	Nacional (Paraguay 4)	First stage	2022 División de Honor aggregate table 2nd best team not yet qualified
Peru (4 berths)	Alianza Lima (Peru 1)	Group stage	2022 Liga 1 champions
Peru (4 berths)	Melgar (Peru 2)	Group stage	2022 Liga 1 runners-up
Peru (4 berths)	Sporting Cristal (Peru 3)	Second stage	2022 Liga 1 3rd place
Peru (4 berths)	Sport Huancayo (Peru 4)	First stage	2022 Liga 1 4th place
Uruguay (4 berths)	Nacional (Uruguay 1)	Group stage	2022 Campeonato Uruguayo champions
Uruguay (4 berths)	Liverpool (Uruguay 2)	Group stage	2022 Campeonato Uruguayo runners-up
Uruguay (4 berths)	Deportivo Maldonado (Uruguay 3)	Second stage	2022 Campeonato Uruguayo aggregate table best team not yet qualified
Uruguay (4 berths)	Boston River (Uruguay 4)	First stage	2022 Campeonato Uruguayo aggregate table 2nd best team not yet qualified
Venezuela (4 berths)	Metropolitanos (Venezuela 1)	Group stage	2022 Liga FUTVE champions
Venezuela (4 berths)	Monagas (Venezuela 2)	Group stage	2022 Liga FUTVE runners-up
Venezuela (4 berths)	Carabobo (Venezuela 3)	Second stage	2022 Liga FUTVE Fase Final Libertadores 3rd place
Venezuela (4 berths)	Zamora (Venezuela 4)	First stage	2022 Liga FUTVE Fase Final Libertadores 4th place

Notes

1. Bolivia (BOL): Since the 2022 Clausura tournament was abandoned and no champion was declared due to civil unrest, the Bolivia 2, Bolivia 3, and Bolivia 4 berths were awarded to the three best-placed teams in the aggregate table at the time of abandonment.

== Schedule ==
The schedule of the competition was as follows:

Stage	Draw date	First leg	Second leg
First stage	21 December 2022	7–9 February 2023	14–16 February 2023
Second stage	21 December 2022	21–23 February 2023	28 February – 2 March 2023
Third stage	21 December 2022	8–9 March 2023	15–16 March 2023
Group stage	27 March 2023	Matchday 1: 4–6 April 2023; Matchday 2: 18–20 April 2023; Matchday 3: 2–4 May 2023; Matchday 4: 23–25 May 2023; Matchday 5: 6–8 June 2023; Matchday 6: 27–29 June 2023	
Round of 16	5 July 2023	1–3 August 2023	8–10 August 2023
Quarter-finals	5 July 2023	22–24 August 2023	29–31 August 2023
Semi-finals	5 July 2023	27–28 September 2023	4–5 October 2023
Final	5 July 2023	4 November 2023 at Estádio do Maracanã, Rio de Janeiro	

== Draws ==
Location of teams of the 2023 Copa Libertadores.
Brown: Group A; Red: Group B; Orange: Group C;
Yellow: Group D; Green: Group E; Blue: Group F;
Purple: Group G; Pink: Group H; White: Play-off rounds.

The draw for the qualifying stages was held on 21 December 2022, 12:00 PYST (UTC−3), at the CONMEBOL Convention Centre in Luque, Paraguay.

Teams were seeded by their CONMEBOL Clubs ranking as of 9 December 2022 (shown in parentheses), taking into account the following three factors:

1. Performance in the last 10 years, taking into account Copa Libertadores and Copa Sudamericana results in the period 2013–2022.
2. Historical coefficient, taking into account Copa Libertadores and Copa Sudamericana results in the period 1960–2012 and 2002–2012 respectively.
3. Local tournament champion, with bonus points awarded to domestic league champions of the last 10 years.

For the first stage, the six teams were drawn into three ties (E1–E3), with the teams from Pot 1 hosting the second leg.

First stage draw
Pot 1	Pot 2
(Paraguay) Nacional (71); (Ecuador) El Nacional (73); (Venezuela) Zamora (99)	(Peru) Sport Huancayo (119); (Bolivia) Nacional Potosí (181); (Uruguay) Boston River (224)

For the second stage, the 16 teams were drawn into eight ties (C1–C8), with the teams from Pot 1 hosting the second leg. Teams from the same association could not be drawn into the same tie, excluding the three winners of the first stage, which were seeded in Pot 2 and whose identity was not known at the time of the draw, and could be drawn into the same tie with another team from the same association.

Second stage draw
Pot 1	Pot 2
(Brazil) Atlético Mineiro (11); (Paraguay) Cerro Porteño (15); (Peru) Sporting Cristal (35); (Colombia) Independiente Medellín (54); (Colombia) Millonarios (57); (Argentina) Huracán (58); (Bolivia) Always Ready (74); (Brazil) Fortaleza (78)	(Ecuador) Universidad Católica (90); (Venezuela) Carabobo (183); (Chile) Magallanes (215); (Chile) Curicó Unido (No rank); (Uruguay) Deportivo Maldonado (No rank); First stage winner E1; First stage winner E2; First stage winner E3

For the third stage, the eight winners of the second stage were allocated without any draw into the following four ties (G1–G4), with the team in each tie with the higher CONMEBOL ranking hosting the second leg.

- Second stage winner C1 vs. Second stage winner C8
- Second stage winner C2 vs. Second stage winner C7
- Second stage winner C3 vs. Second stage winner C6
- Second stage winner C4 vs. Second stage winner C5

The draw for the group stage was held on 27 March 2023, 20:00 PYT (UTC−4), at the CONMEBOL Convention Centre in Luque, Paraguay. For the group stage, the 32 teams were drawn into eight groups (Groups A–H) of four containing a team from each of the four pots. The defending champions Flamengo were directly assigned as the top seed of Group A (position A1). The remaining teams were distributed into four pots according to their CONMEBOL Clubs ranking. Teams from the same association could not be drawn into the same group, excluding the four winners of the third stage, which were allocated to Pot 4 and could be drawn into the same group with another team from the same association.

Group stage draw
Pot 1	Pot 2	Pot 3	Pot 4
(Brazil) Flamengo (3); (Argentina) River Plate (1); (Brazil) Palmeiras (2); (Argentina) Boca Juniors (4); (Uruguay) Nacional (6); (Brazil) Athletico Paranaense (7); (Ecuador) Independiente del Valle (12); (Paraguay) Olimpia (14)	(Paraguay) Libertad (16); (Colombia) Atlético Nacional (17); (Brazil) Internacional (18); (Ecuador) Barcelona (19); (Argentina) Racing (22); (Brazil) Corinthians (24); (Chile) Colo-Colo (28); (Brazil) Fluminense (32)	(Bolivia) Bolívar (33); (Bolivia) The Strongest (38); (Peru) Melgar (44); (Peru) Alianza Lima (52); (Argentina) Argentinos Juniors (55); (Venezuela) Metropolitanos (97); (Ecuador) Aucas (112); (Venezuela) Monagas (133)	(Uruguay) Liverpool (165); (Colombia) Deportivo Pereira (205); (Chile) Ñublense (230); (Argentina) Patronato (No rank); (Brazil) Atlético Mineiro (11); (Peru) Sporting Cristal (35); (Paraguay) Cerro Porteño (15); (Colombia) Independiente Medellín (54)

Notes

1. ^{TH} The defending Copa Libertadores champions were seeded in Pot 1 and were automatically allocated to Group A and the position A1.
2. ^{CS} The defending Copa Sudamericana champions (normally seeded in Pot 2) were seeded in Pot 1 due to their CONMEBOL Clubs rank.
3. ^{Q3} The third stage winners were seeded in Pot 4.

The draw for the round of 16 was held on 5 July 2023, 12:00 PYT (UTC−4) at the CONMEBOL Convention Center in Luque, Paraguay. For the round of 16, the 16 teams were drawn into eight ties (A–H) between a group winner (Pot 1) and a group runner-up (Pot 2), with the group winners hosting the second leg. Teams from the same association or the same group could be drawn into the same tie (Regulations Article 2.2.3.2).

== Qualifying stages ==
In the qualifying stages, each tie was played on a home-and-away two-legged basis. If the teams had been tied on aggregate, extra time would not have been played, and a penalty shoot-out would have been used to determine the winner (Regulations Article 2.4.3). The qualifying stages were structured as follows:

- First stage (6 teams): The three winners of the first stage advanced to the second stage to join the 13 teams which were given byes to the second stage.
- Second stage (16 teams): The eight winners of the second stage advanced to the third stage.
- Third stage (8 teams): The four winners of the third stage advanced to the group stage to join the 28 direct entrants. The four teams eliminated in the third stage entered the Copa Sudamericana group stage.

=== First stage ===
Team 1	Agg.	Team 2	1st leg	2nd leg
Sport Huancayo (Peru)	3–4	(Paraguay) Nacional	2–1	1–3
Nacional Potosí (Bolivia)	2–9	(Ecuador) El Nacional	1–6	1–3
Boston River (Uruguay)	4–1	(Venezuela) Zamora	3–1	1–0

=== Second stage ===
Team 1	Agg.	Team 2	1st leg	2nd leg
Carabobo (Venezuela)	1–3	(Brazil) Atlético Mineiro	0–0	1–3
Nacional (Paraguay)	3–5	(Peru) Sporting Cristal	2–0	1–5
Deportivo Maldonado (Uruguay)	0–4	(Brazil) Fortaleza	0–0	0–4
El Nacional (Ecuador)	3–4	(Colombia) Independiente Medellín	2–2	1–2
Magallanes (Chile)	6–1	(Bolivia) Always Ready	3–0	3–1
Curicó Unido (Chile)	0–2	(Paraguay) Cerro Porteño	0–1	0–1
Boston River (Uruguay)	0–1	(Argentina) Huracán	0–0	0–1
Universidad Católica (Ecuador)	1–2	(Colombia) Millonarios	0–0	1–2

=== Third stage ===
Team 1	Agg.	Team 2	1st leg	2nd leg
Millonarios (Colombia)	2–4	(Brazil) Atlético Mineiro	1–1	1–3
Huracán (Argentina)	0–1	(Peru) Sporting Cristal	0–0	0–1
Fortaleza (Brazil)	1–3	(Paraguay) Cerro Porteño	0–1	1–2
Magallanes (Chile)	1–3	(Colombia) Independiente Medellín	1–1	0–2

== Group stage ==
In the group stage, each group was played on a home-and-away round-robin basis. The teams were ranked according to the following criteria: 1. Points (3 points for a win, 1 point for a draw, and 0 points for a loss); 2. Goal difference; 3. Goals scored; 4. Away goals scored; 5. CONMEBOL ranking (Regulations Article 2.4.2).

The winners and runners-up of each group advanced to the round of 16 of the final stages. The third-placed teams of each group entered the knockout round play-offs of the 2023 Copa Sudamericana.

=== Group A ===
Pos	Team	Pld	W	D	L	GF	GA	GD	Pts	Qualification	RAC	FLA	ÑUB	AUC
1	(Argentina) Racing	6	4	1	1	13	6	+7	13	Round of 16	—	1–1	4–0	3–2
2	(Brazil) Flamengo	6	3	2	1	11	5	+6	11	Round of 16	2–1	—	2–0	4–0
3	(Chile) Ñublense	6	1	2	3	3	10	−7	5	Copa Sudamericana	0–2	1–1	—	2–1
4	(Ecuador) Aucas	6	1	1	4	6	12	−6	4		1–2	2–1	0–0	—

Source: CONMEBOL

=== Group B ===
Pos	Team	Pld	W	D	L	GF	GA	GD	Pts	Qualification	INT	NAC	DIM	MET
1	(Brazil) Internacional	6	3	3	0	10	6	+4	12	Round of 16	—	2–2	3–1	1–0
2	(Uruguay) Nacional	6	3	2	1	9	7	+2	11	Round of 16	1–1	—	2–1	1–0
3	(Colombia) Independiente Medellín	6	3	1	2	10	9	+1	10	Copa Sudamericana	1–1	2–1	—	4–2
4	(Venezuela) Metropolitanos	6	0	0	6	4	11	−7	0		1–2	1–2	0–1	—

Source: CONMEBOL

=== Group C ===
Pos	Team	Pld	W	D	L	GF	GA	GD	Pts	Qualification	PAL	BOL	BSC	CCP
1	(Brazil) Palmeiras	6	5	0	1	16	6	+10	15	Round of 16	—	4–0	4–2	2–1
2	(Bolivia) Bolívar	6	4	0	2	11	7	+4	12	Round of 16	3–1	—	1–0	2–0
3	(Ecuador) Barcelona	6	1	1	4	7	12	−5	4	Copa Sudamericana	0–2	2–1	—	2–2
4	(Paraguay) Cerro Porteño	6	1	1	4	5	14	−9	4		0–3	0–4	2–1	—

Source: CONMEBOL

=== Group D ===
Pos	Team	Pld	W	D	L	GF	GA	GD	Pts	Qualification	FLU	RIV	CRI	STR
1	(Brazil) Fluminense	6	3	1	2	10	6	+4	10	Round of 16	—	5–1	1–1	1–0
2	(Argentina) River Plate	6	3	1	2	11	11	0	10	Round of 16	2–0	—	4–2	2–0
3	(Peru) Sporting Cristal	6	2	2	2	8	10	−2	8	Copa Sudamericana	1–3	1–1	—	1–0
4	(Bolivia) The Strongest	6	2	0	4	5	7	−2	6		1–0	3–1	1–2	—

Source: CONMEBOL

=== Group E ===
Pos	Team	Pld	W	D	L	GF	GA	GD	Pts	Qualification	IDV	ARG	COR	LIV
1	(Ecuador) Independiente del Valle	6	4	0	2	10	5	+5	12	Round of 16	—	3–2	3–0	2–0
2	(Argentina) Argentinos Juniors	6	3	2	1	8	6	+2	11	Round of 16	1–0	—	0–0	2–1
3	(Brazil) Corinthians	6	2	1	3	7	6	+1	7	Copa Sudamericana	1–2	0–1	—	3–0
4	(Uruguay) Liverpool	6	1	1	4	4	12	−8	4		1–0	2–2	0–3	—

Source: CONMEBOL

=== Group F ===
Pos	Team	Pld	W	D	L	GF	GA	GD	Pts	Qualification	BOC	PER	CCL	MON
1	(Argentina) Boca Juniors	6	4	1	1	9	2	+7	13	Round of 16	—	2–1	1–0	4–0
2	(Colombia) Deportivo Pereira	6	2	2	2	5	5	0	8	Round of 16	1–0	—	1–1	2–1
3	(Chile) Colo-Colo	6	1	3	2	3	5	−2	6	Copa Sudamericana	0–2	0–0	—	1–0
4	(Venezuela) Monagas	6	1	2	3	3	8	−5	5		0–0	1–0	1–1	—

Source: CONMEBOL

=== Group G ===
Pos	Team	Pld	W	D	L	GF	GA	GD	Pts	Qualification	CAP	CAM	LIB	ALI
1	(Brazil) Athletico Paranaense	6	4	1	1	9	4	+5	13	Round of 16	—	2–1	1–0	3–0
2	(Brazil) Atlético Mineiro	6	3	1	2	7	5	+2	10	Round of 16	2–1	—	0–1	2–0
3	(Paraguay) Libertad	6	2	1	3	6	7	−1	7	Copa Sudamericana	1–2	1–1	—	1–2
4	(Peru) Alianza Lima	6	1	1	4	3	9	−6	4		0–0	0–1	1–2	—

Source: CONMEBOL

=== Group H ===
Pos	Team	Pld	W	D	L	GF	GA	GD	Pts	Qualification	OLI	ATN	PAT	MEL
1	(Paraguay) Olimpia	6	4	2	0	13	4	+9	14	Round of 16	—	3–0	1–0	4–1
2	(Colombia) Atlético Nacional	6	3	1	2	8	8	0	10	Round of 16	2–2	—	0–1	3–1
3	(Argentina) Patronato	6	2	0	4	6	11	−5	6	Copa Sudamericana	0–2	1–2	—	4–1
4	(Peru) Melgar	6	1	1	4	9	13	−4	4		1–1	0–1	5–0	—

Source: CONMEBOL

== Final stages ==
Starting from the round of 16, the teams play a single-elimination tournament with the following rules:

- In the round of 16, quarter-finals and semi-finals, each tie is played on a home-and-away two-legged basis, with the higher-seeded team hosting the second leg (Regulations Article 2.2.3.2). If tied on aggregate, away goals will not be used, extra time will not be played, and a penalty shoot-out will be used to determine the winners (Regulations Article 2.4.3).
- The final is played as a single match at a venue pre-selected by CONMEBOL, with the higher-seeded team designated as the "home" team for administrative purposes (Regulations Article 2.2.3.5). If tied after regulation, 30 minutes of extra time will be played. If still tied after extra time, a penalty shoot-out will be used to determine the winners (Regulations Article 2.4.4).

=== Qualified teams ===
The winners and runners-up of each of the eight groups in the group stage advanced to the round of 16.

Group	Winners	Runners-up
A	(Argentine Football Association) Racing	(Brazilian Football Confederation) Flamengo
B	(Brazilian Football Confederation) Internacional	(Uruguayan Football Association) Nacional
C	(Brazilian Football Confederation) Palmeiras	(Bolivian Football Federation) Bolívar
D	(Brazilian Football Confederation) Fluminense	(Argentine Football Association) River Plate
E	(Ecuadorian Football Federation) Independiente del Valle	(Argentine Football Association) Argentinos Juniors
F	(Argentine Football Association) Boca Juniors	(Colombian Football Federation) Deportivo Pereira
G	(Brazilian Football Confederation) Athletico Paranaense	(Brazilian Football Confederation) Atlético Mineiro
H	(Paraguayan Football Association) Olimpia	(Colombian Football Federation) Atlético Nacional

=== Seeding ===
Starting from the round of 16, the teams are seeded according to their results in the group stage, with the group winners (Pot 1) seeded 1–8, and the group runners-up (Pot 2) seeded 9–16.

Seed	Grp	Team	Pld	W	D	L	GF	GA	GD	Pts	Round of 16 draw
1	C	(Brazilian Football Confederation) Palmeiras	6	5	0	1	16	6	+10	15	Pot 1
2	H	(Paraguayan Football Association) Olimpia	6	4	2	0	13	4	+9	14	Pot 1
3	A	(Argentine Football Association) Racing	6	4	1	1	13	6	+7	13	Pot 1
4	F	(Argentine Football Association) Boca Juniors	6	4	1	1	9	2	+7	13	Pot 1
5	G	(Brazilian Football Confederation) Athletico Paranaense	6	4	1	1	9	4	+5	13	Pot 1
6	E	(Ecuadorian Football Federation) Independiente del Valle	6	4	0	2	10	5	+5	12	Pot 1
7	B	(Brazilian Football Confederation) Internacional	6	3	3	0	10	6	+4	12	Pot 1
8	D	(Brazilian Football Confederation) Fluminense	6	3	1	2	10	6	+4	10	Pot 1
9	C	(Bolivian Football Federation) Bolívar	6	4	0	2	11	7	+4	12	Pot 2
10	A	(Brazilian Football Confederation) Flamengo	6	3	2	1	11	5	+6	11	Pot 2
11	B	(Uruguayan Football Association) Nacional	6	3	2	1	9	7	+2	11	Pot 2
12	E	(Argentine Football Association) Argentinos Juniors	6	3	2	1	8	6	+2	11	Pot 2
13	G	(Brazilian Football Confederation) Atlético Mineiro	6	3	1	2	7	5	+2	10	Pot 2
14	D	(Argentine Football Association) River Plate	6	3	1	2	11	11	0	10	Pot 2
15	H	(Colombian Football Federation) Atlético Nacional	6	3	1	2	8	8	0	10	Pot 2
16	F	(Colombian Football Federation) Deportivo Pereira	6	2	2	2	5	5	0	8	Pot 2

Source: CONMEBOL
Rules for classification: 1) Higher position in group; 2) Points; 3) Goal difference; 4) Goals scored; 5) Away goals scored; 6) CONMEBOL ranking (Regulations Article 2.4.2).

=== Bracket ===
The bracket was decided based on the round of 16 draw, which was held on 5 July 2023.

Round of 16
11	(Uruguayan Football Association) Nacional	0	2	2 (2)
4	(Argentine Football Association) Boca Juniors (p)	0	2	2 (4)
15	(Colombian Football Federation) Atlético Nacional	4	0	4
3	(Argentine Football Association) Racing	2	3	5
16	(Colombian Football Federation) Deportivo Pereira	1	1	2
6	(Ecuadorian Football Federation) Independiente del Valle	0	1	1
13	(Brazilian Football Confederation) Atlético Mineiro	0	0	0
1	(Brazilian Football Confederation) Palmeiras	1	0	1
12	(Argentine Football Association) Argentinos Juniors	1	0	1
8	(Brazilian Football Confederation) Fluminense	1	2	3
10	(Brazilian Football Confederation) Flamengo	1	1	2
2	(Paraguayan Football Association) Olimpia	0	3	3
9	(Bolivian Football Federation) Bolívar (p)	3	0	3 (5)
5	(Brazilian Football Confederation) Athletico Paranaense	1	2	3 (4)
14	(Argentine Football Association) River Plate	2	1	3 (8)
7	(Brazilian Football Confederation) Internacional (p)	1	2	3 (9)

Quarter-finals
4	(Argentine Football Association) Boca Juniors (p)	0	0	0 (4)
3	(Argentine Football Association) Racing	0	0	0 (1)
16	(Colombian Football Federation) Deportivo Pereira	0	0	0
1	(Brazilian Football Confederation) Palmeiras	4	0	4
8	(Brazilian Football Confederation) Fluminense	2	3	5
2	(Paraguayan Football Association) Olimpia	0	1	1
9	(Bolivian Football Federation) Bolívar	0	0	0
7	(Brazilian Football Confederation) Internacional	1	2	3

Semi-finals
4	(Argentine Football Association) Boca Juniors (p)	0	1	1 (4)
1	(Brazilian Football Confederation) Palmeiras	0	1	1 (2)
8	(Brazilian Football Confederation) Fluminense	2	2	4
7	(Brazilian Football Confederation) Internacional	2	1	3

Final
4 November – Rio de Janeiro
4	(Argentine Football Association) Boca Juniors	1
8	(Brazilian Football Confederation) Fluminense (a.e.t.)	2

=== Round of 16 ===
Team 1	Agg.	Team 2	1st leg	2nd leg
Atlético Nacional (Colombia)	4–5	(Argentina) Racing	4–2	0–3
Bolívar (Bolivia)	3–3 (5–4 p)	(Brazil) Athletico Paranaense	3–1	0–2
Flamengo (Brazil)	2–3	(Paraguay) Olimpia	1–0	1–3
Atlético Mineiro (Brazil)	0–1	(Brazil) Palmeiras	0–1	0–0
Deportivo Pereira (Colombia)	2–1	(Ecuador) Independiente del Valle	1–0	1–1
Argentinos Juniors (Argentina)	1–3	(Brazil) Fluminense	1–1	0–2
River Plate (Argentina)	3–3 (8–9 p)	(Brazil) Internacional	2–1	1–2
Nacional (Uruguay)	2–2 (2–4 p)	(Argentina) Boca Juniors	0–0	2–2

=== Quarter-finals ===
Team 1	Agg.	Team 2	1st leg	2nd leg
Boca Juniors (Argentina)	0–0 (4–1 p)	(Argentina) Racing	0–0	0–0
Bolívar (Bolivia)	0–3	(Brazil) Internacional	0–1	0–2
Fluminense (Brazil)	5–1	(Paraguay) Olimpia	2–0	3–1
Deportivo Pereira (Colombia)	0–4	(Brazil) Palmeiras	0–4	0–0

=== Semi-finals ===
Team 1	Agg.	Team 2	1st leg	2nd leg
Boca Juniors (Argentina)	1–1 (4–2 p)	(Brazil) Palmeiras	0–0	1–1
Fluminense (Brazil)	4–3	(Brazil) Internacional	2–2	2–1

=== Final ===
4 November 2023
17:00 UTC−3

Boca Juniors (Argentina)	1–2 (a.e.t.)	(Brazil) Fluminense
Advíncula 72'	Report	Cano 36'; John Kennedy 99'

Maracanã, Rio de Janeiro
Attendance: 69,232
Referee: Wilmar Roldán (Colombia)

== Statistics ==
=== Top scorers ===
Rank	Player	Team	1Q1	1Q2	2Q1	2Q2	3Q1	3Q2	GS1	GS2	GS3	GS4	GS5	GS6	⅛F1	⅛F2	QF1	QF2	SF1	SF2	F	Total
1	(Argentina) Germán Cano	(Brazil) Fluminense							2		3			1			1	2	2	1	1	13
2	(Brazil) Paulinho	(Brazil) Atlético Mineiro				1	1	2		1		2										7
3	(Colombia) Dorlan Pabón	(Colombia) Atlético Nacional							2	3	1											6
4	(Brazil) Alan Patrick	(Brazil) Internacional							1			1	1			1			1			5
4	(Brazil) Artur	(Brazil) Palmeiras										2	1	2								5
4	(Argentina) Luciano Pons	(Colombia) Independiente Medellín						2		1	1			1								5
7	(Peru) Luis Advíncula	(Argentina) Boca Juniors								1	1					1					1	4
7	(Uruguay) Rubén Bentancourt	(Uruguay) Liverpool									2	1	1									4
7	(Chile) Ronnie Fernández	(Bolivia) Bolívar								1		1			2							4
7	(Brazil) John Kennedy	(Brazil) Fluminense														1		1		1	1	4
7	(Paraguay) Guillermo Paiva	(Paraguay) Olimpia							1				1	2								4
7	(Argentina) Enrique Triverio	(Bolivia) The Strongest							2			1	1									4
7	(Ecuador) Enner Valencia	(Brazil) Internacional													1		1	2				4
7	(Brazil) Vitor Roque	(Brazil) Athletico Paranaense								1				2		1						4

Source: CONMEBOL

=== Team of the tournament ===
The CONMEBOL technical study group selected the following 11 players as the team of the tournament.

Position	Player	Team
Goalkeeper	(Argentina) Sergio Romero	(Argentina) Boca Juniors
Defenders	(Peru) Luis Advíncula	(Argentina) Boca Juniors
Defenders	(Brazil) Nino	(Brazil) Fluminense
Defenders	(Uruguay) Joaquín Piquerez	(Brazil) Palmeiras
Midfielders	(Colombia) Jhon Arias	(Brazil) Fluminense
Midfielders	(Brazil) André	(Brazil) Fluminense
Midfielders	(Brazil) Alan Patrick	(Brazil) Internacional
Midfielders	(Brazil) Paulo Henrique Ganso	(Brazil) Fluminense
Forwards	(Ecuador) Enner Valencia	(Brazil) Internacional
Forwards	(Argentina) Germán Cano	(Brazil) Fluminense
Forwards	(Brazil) Paulinho	(Brazil) Atlético Mineiro

== See also ==
- 2023 Copa Sudamericana
