= 2023 Copa Libertadores final =

64th edition final match of the Copa Libertadores

- Promotional poster of the final
- Event: 2023 Copa Libertadores
Boca Juniors	Fluminense
(Argentina)	(Brazil)
1	2
- After extra time
- Date: 4 November 2023
- Venue: Maracanã, Rio de Janeiro
- Referee: Wilmar Roldán (Colombia)
- Attendance: 69,232

The 2023 Copa Libertadores final was the final match which decided the winner of the 2023 Copa Libertadores. This was the 64th edition of the Copa Libertadores, the top-tier South American continental club football tournament organized by CONMEBOL. The match was played between Argentine team Boca Juniors and Brazilian side Fluminense on 4 November 2023 at the Maracanã in Rio de Janeiro, Brazil.

Fluminense won their first ever Copa Libertadores by defeating Boca Juniors 2–1 after extra time.

As winners, Fluminense qualified for the 2023 and 2025 FIFA Club World Cups and earned the right to play against the 2023 Copa Sudamericana winners LDU in the 2024 Recopa Sudamericana (which Fluminense would later go on to win as well). They also automatically qualified for the 2024 Copa Libertadores group stage.

== Venue ==
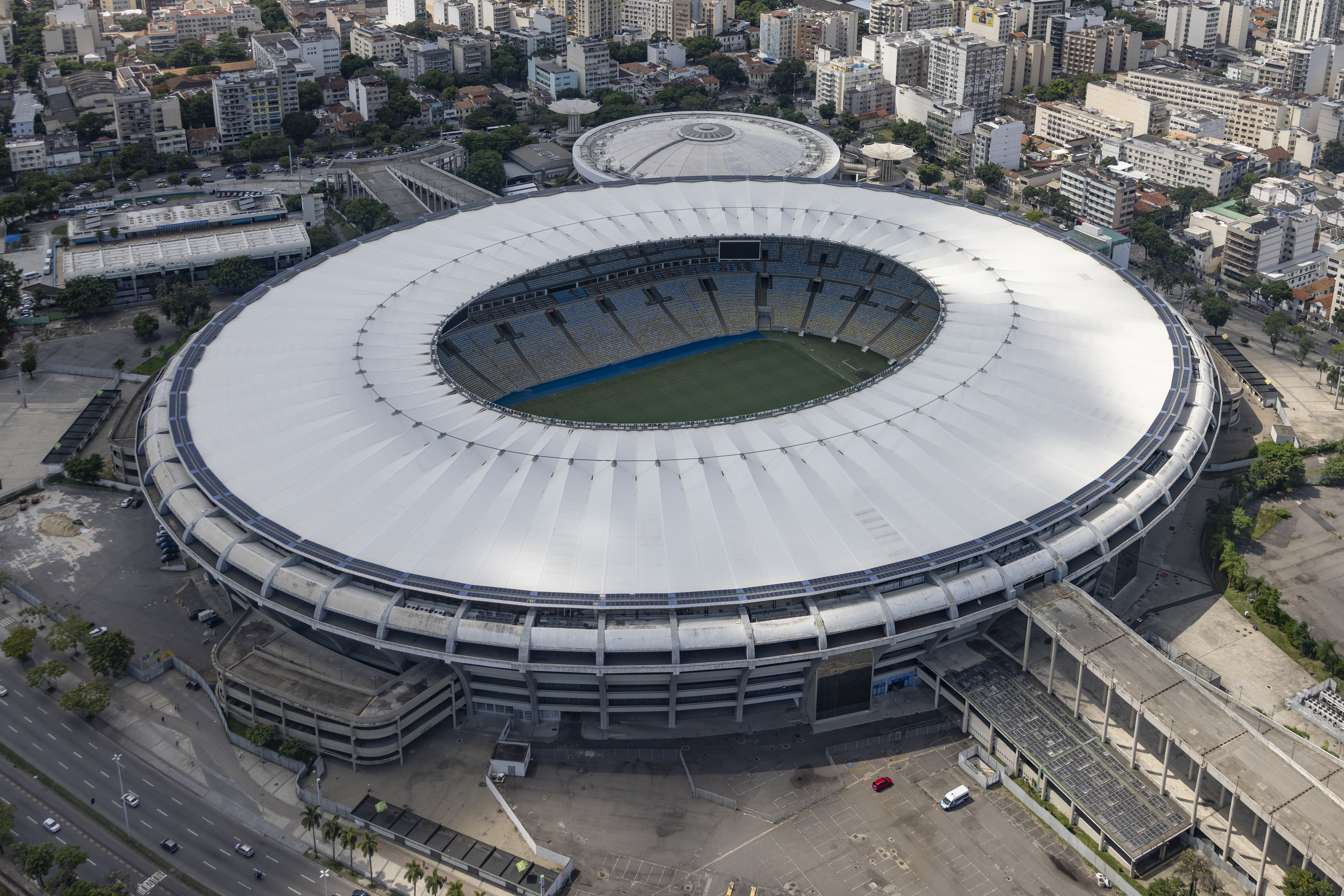
Estadio Maracanã in Rio de Janeiro hosted the final

Bidding Venues for the 2023 Copa Libertadores final
Association	Stadium	City	Capacity
Argentina	El Cilindro	Avellaneda	61,000
Argentina	Estadio Libertadores de América	Avellaneda	48,069
Argentina	Estadio Monumental	Buenos Aires	70,074
Argentina	La Bombonera	Buenos Aires	54,000
Argentina	Estadio Mario Alberto Kempes	Córdoba	57,000
Brazil	Arena da Baixada	Curitiba	42,372
Brazil	Estádio Beira-Rio	Porto Alegre	50,128
Brazil	Maracanã	Rio de Janeiro	78,838
Brazil	Estádio do Morumbi	São Paulo	67,052
Brazil	Arena Corinthians	São Paulo	49,205
Chile	Estadio Nacional Julio Martínez Prádanos	Santiago	58,665
Ecuador	Estadio Monumental Isidro Romero Carbo	Guayaquil	59,283
Peru	Estadio Monumental	Lima	80,093
Peru	Estadio Nacional del Perú	Lima	50,000
Uruguay	Estadio Centenario	Montevideo	60,235

== Teams ==
Team	Previous finals appearances (bold indicates winners)
(Argentina) Boca Juniors	11 (1963, **1977**, **1978**, 1979, **2000**, **2001**, **2003**, 2004, **2007**, 2012, 2018)
(Brazil) Fluminense	1 (2008)

== Road to the final ==
Note: In all scores below, the score of the home team is given first.

(Argentina) Boca Juniors			Round	(Brazil) Fluminense		
Opponent	Venue	Score		Opponent	Venue	Score
Bye			Qualifying stages	Bye		
**Group F**			Group stage	**Group D**		
(Venezuela) Monagas	Away	0–0	Group stage	(Peru) Sporting Cristal	Away	1–3
(Colombia) Deportivo Pereira	Home	2–1	Group stage	(Bolivia) The Strongest	Home	1–0
(Chile) Colo-Colo	Away	0–2	Group stage	(Argentina) River Plate	Home	5–1
(Colombia) Deportivo Pereira	Away	1–0	Group stage	(Bolivia) The Strongest	Away	1–0
(Chile) Colo-Colo	Home	1–0	Group stage	(Argentina) River Plate	Away	2–0
(Venezuela) Monagas	Home	4–0	Group stage	(Peru) Sporting Cristal	Home	1–1
Pos / Team / Pld / Pts; **1** / (Argentina) Boca Juniors / **6** / **13**; 2 / (Colombia) Deportivo Pereira / 6 / **8**; 3 / (Chile) Colo-Colo / 6 / **6**; 4 / (Venezuela) Monagas / 6 / **5**; Source: CONMEBOL			Group stage	Pos / Team / Pld / Pts; **1** / (Brazil) Fluminense / **6** / **10**; 2 / (Argentina) River Plate / 6 / **10**; 3 / (Peru) Sporting Cristal / 6 / **8**; 4 / (Bolivia) The Strongest / 6 / **6**; Source: CONMEBOL		
**Seed 4**			Final stages	**Seed 8**		
(Uruguay) Nacional (tied 2–2 on aggregate, won on penalties)	Away	0–0	Round of 16	(Argentina) Argentinos Juniors (won 3–1 on aggregate)	Away	1–1
(Uruguay) Nacional (tied 2–2 on aggregate, won on penalties)	Home	2–2 (4–2 p)	Round of 16	(Argentina) Argentinos Juniors (won 3–1 on aggregate)	Home	2–0
(Argentina) Racing (tied 0–0 on aggregate, won on penalties)	Home	0–0	Quarter-finals	(Paraguay) Olimpia (won 5–1 on aggregate)	Home	2–0
(Argentina) Racing (tied 0–0 on aggregate, won on penalties)	Away	0–0 (1–4 p)	Quarter-finals	(Paraguay) Olimpia (won 5–1 on aggregate)	Away	1–3
(Brazil) Palmeiras (tied 1–1 on aggregate, won on penalties)	Home	0–0	Semi-finals	(Brazil) Internacional (won 4–3 on aggregate)	Home	2–2
(Brazil) Palmeiras (tied 1–1 on aggregate, won on penalties)	Away	1–1 (2–4 p)	Semi-finals	(Brazil) Internacional (won 4–3 on aggregate)	Away	1–2

== Match details ==
Marcos Rojo (sent off in the semi-final second leg) and Exequiel Zeballos (knee injury) from Boca Juniors and Manoel (doping suspension) from Fluminense were ruled out of the final.

4 November 2023
17:00 UTC−3

Boca Juniors (Argentina)	1–2 (a.e.t.)	(Brazil) Fluminense
Advíncula 72'	Report	Cano 36'; John Kennedy 99'

Maracanã, Rio de Janeiro
Attendance: 69,232
Referee: Wilmar Roldán (Colombia)

**Boca Juniors**	**Fluminense**

GK	1	(Argentina) Sergio Romero (c)
RB	17	(Peru) Luis Advíncula
CB	4	(Argentina) Nicolás Figal	(yellow card) 68'	(substituted off) 113'
CB	15	(Argentina) Nicolás Valentini
LB	18	(Colombia) Frank Fabra	(red card) 105+7'
DM	21	(Argentina) Ezequiel Fernández		(substituted off) 106'
RM	16	(Uruguay) Miguel Merentiel		(substituted off) 91'
CM	36	(Argentina) Cristian Medina		(substituted off) 106'
CM	8	(Argentina) Pol Fernández
LM	19	(Argentina) Valentín Barco		(substituted off) 78'
CF	10	(Uruguay) Edinson Cavani	(yellow card) 64'	(substituted off) 78'
Substitutes:
GK	13	(Argentina) Javier García
DF	2	(Argentina) Facundo Roncaglia
DF	3	(Uruguay) Marcelo Saracchi	(yellow card) 120'	(substituted on) 106'
DF	25	(Paraguay) Bruno Valdez		(substituted on) 113'
DF	57	(Argentina) Marcelo Weigandt
MF	20	(Argentina) Juan Ramírez
MF	23	(Argentina) Diego González
MF	39	(Argentina) Vicente Taborda		(substituted on) 106'
MF	49	(Colombia) Jorman Campuzano
FW	9	(Argentina) Darío Benedetto		(substituted on) 78'
FW	11	(Argentina) Lucas Janson		(substituted on) 91'
FW	41	(Argentina) Luca Langoni	(yellow card) 94'	(substituted on) 78'
Manager:
(Argentina) Jorge Almirón

GK	1	(Brazil) Fábio
RB	2	(Brazil) Samuel Xavier		(substituted off) 85'
CB	33	(Brazil) Nino (c)	(yellow card) 105+7'
CB	30	(Brazil) Felipe Melo		(substituted off) 52'
LB	12	(Brazil) Marcelo		(substituted off) 80'
CM	8	(Brazil) Martinelli		(substituted off) 80'
CM	7	(Brazil) André
RW	21	(Colombia) Jhon Arias
AM	10	(Brazil) Ganso		(substituted off) 80'
LW	11	(Brazil) Keno	(yellow card) 67'	(substituted off) 103'
CF	14	(Argentina) Germán Cano	(yellow card) 120'
Substitutes:
GK	22	(Brazil) Pedro Rangel
DF	4	(Brazil) Marlon		(substituted on) 52'
DF	23	(Brazil) Guga		(substituted on) 85'
DF	40	(Brazil) Diogo Barbosa		(substituted on) 80'
DF	44	(Brazil) David Braz		(substituted on) 103'
MF	5	(Brazil) Alexsander
MF	19	(Uruguay) Leo Fernández
MF	20	(Brazil) Daniel
MF	29	(Brazil) Thiago Santos
MF	45	(Brazil) Lima		(substituted on) 80'
FW	9	(Brazil) John Kennedy	(yellow card) 89' (yellow-red card) 101'	(substituted on) 80'
FW	38	(Colombia) Yony González
Manager:
(Brazil) Fernando Diniz

Assistant referees:
Alexander Guzmán (Colombia)
Dionisio Ruiz (Colombia)
Fourth official:
Andrés Rojas (Colombia)
Fifth official:
Wilmar Navarro (Colombia)
Video assistant referee:
Juan Lara (Chile)
Assistant video assistant referees:
Ángelo Hermosilla (Chile)
Edson Cisternas (Chile)
Jhon Ospina (Colombia)

**Match rules**
- 90 minutes.
- 30 minutes of extra time if necessary.
- Penalty shoot-out if scores still level.
- Twelve named substitutes.
- Maximum of five substitutions, with a sixth allowed in extra time.

== See also ==
- 2023 Copa Sudamericana final
- 2024 Recopa Sudamericana
