= 2023 Copa Libertadores final stages =

Football competition

The 2023 Copa Libertadores final stages were played from 1 August to 4 November 2023. A total of 16 teams competed in the final stages to decide the champions of the 2023 Copa Libertadores, with the final played in Rio de Janeiro, Brazil at Estádio do Maracanã.

== Qualified teams ==
The winners and runners-up of each of the eight groups in the group stage advanced to the round of 16.

| Group | Winners | Runners-up |
|---|---|---|
| A | (Argentine Football Association) Racing | (Brazilian Football Confederation) Flamengo |
| B | (Brazilian Football Confederation) Internacional | (Uruguayan Football Association) Nacional |
| C | (Brazilian Football Confederation) Palmeiras | (Bolivian Football Federation) Bolívar |
| D | (Brazilian Football Confederation) Fluminense | (Argentine Football Association) River Plate |
| E | (Ecuadorian Football Federation) Independiente del Valle | (Argentine Football Association) Argentinos Juniors |
| F | (Argentine Football Association) Boca Juniors | (Colombian Football Federation) Deportivo Pereira |
| G | (Brazilian Football Confederation) Athletico Paranaense | (Brazilian Football Confederation) Atlético Mineiro |
| H | (Paraguayan Football Association) Olimpia | (Colombian Football Federation) Atlético Nacional |

=== Seeding ===
Starting from the round of 16, the teams were seeded according to their results in the group stage, with the group winners (Pot 1) seeded 1–8, and the group runners-up (Pot 2) seeded 9–16.

| Seed | Grp | Team | Pld | W | D | L | GF | GA | GD | Pts | Round of 16 draw |
|---|---|---|---|---|---|---|---|---|---|---|---|
| 1 | C | (Brazilian Football Confederation) Palmeiras | 6 | 5 | 0 | 1 | 16 | 6 | +10 | 15 | Pot 1 |
| 2 | H | (Paraguayan Football Association) Olimpia | 6 | 4 | 2 | 0 | 13 | 4 | +9 | 14 | Pot 1 |
| 3 | A | (Argentine Football Association) Racing | 6 | 4 | 1 | 1 | 13 | 6 | +7 | 13 | Pot 1 |
| 4 | F | (Argentine Football Association) Boca Juniors | 6 | 4 | 1 | 1 | 9 | 2 | +7 | 13 | Pot 1 |
| 5 | G | (Brazilian Football Confederation) Athletico Paranaense | 6 | 4 | 1 | 1 | 9 | 4 | +5 | 13 | Pot 1 |
| 6 | E | (Ecuadorian Football Federation) Independiente del Valle | 6 | 4 | 0 | 2 | 10 | 5 | +5 | 12 | Pot 1 |
| 7 | B | (Brazilian Football Confederation) Internacional | 6 | 3 | 3 | 0 | 10 | 6 | +4 | 12 | Pot 1 |
| 8 | D | (Brazilian Football Confederation) Fluminense | 6 | 3 | 1 | 2 | 10 | 6 | +4 | 10 | Pot 1 |
| 9 | C | (Bolivian Football Federation) Bolívar | 6 | 4 | 0 | 2 | 11 | 7 | +4 | 12 | Pot 2 |
| 10 | A | (Brazilian Football Confederation) Flamengo | 6 | 3 | 2 | 1 | 11 | 5 | +6 | 11 | Pot 2 |
| 11 | B | (Uruguayan Football Association) Nacional | 6 | 3 | 2 | 1 | 9 | 7 | +2 | 11 | Pot 2 |
| 12 | E | (Argentine Football Association) Argentinos Juniors | 6 | 3 | 2 | 1 | 8 | 6 | +2 | 11 | Pot 2 |
| 13 | G | (Brazilian Football Confederation) Atlético Mineiro | 6 | 3 | 1 | 2 | 7 | 5 | +2 | 10 | Pot 2 |
| 14 | D | (Argentine Football Association) River Plate | 6 | 3 | 1 | 2 | 11 | 11 | 0 | 10 | Pot 2 |
| 15 | H | (Colombian Football Federation) Atlético Nacional | 6 | 3 | 1 | 2 | 8 | 8 | 0 | 10 | Pot 2 |
| 16 | F | (Colombian Football Federation) Deportivo Pereira | 6 | 2 | 2 | 2 | 5 | 5 | 0 | 8 | Pot 2 |

Source: CONMEBOL
Rules for classification: 1) Higher position in group; 2) Points; 3) Goal difference; 4) Goals scored; 5) Away goals scored; 6) CONMEBOL ranking (Regulations Article 2.4.2).

== Format ==
Starting from the round of 16, the teams played a single-elimination tournament with the following rules:

- In the round of 16, quarter-finals and semi-finals, each tie was played on a home-and-away two-legged basis, with the higher-seeded team hosting the second leg (Regulations Article 2.2.3.2). If tied on aggregate, away goals were not used, extra time was not played, and a penalty shoot-out was used to determine the winners (Regulations Article 2.4.3).
- The final was played as a single match at a venue pre-selected by CONMEBOL, with the higher-seeded team designated as the "home" team for administrative purposes (Regulations Article 2.2.3.5). If tied after regulation, 30 minutes of extra time were played. If still tied after extra time, a penalty shoot-out was used to determine the winners (Regulations Article 2.4.4).

== Draw ==
The draw for the round of 16 was held on 5 July 2023, 12:00 PYT (UTC−4) at the CONMEBOL Convention Center in Luque, Paraguay. For the round of 16, the 16 teams were drawn into eight ties (A–H) between a group winner (Pot 1) and a group runner-up (Pot 2), with the group winners hosting the second leg. Teams from the same association or the same group could be drawn into the same tie (Regulations Article 2.2.3.2).

== Bracket ==
The bracket starting from the round of 16 was determined as follows:

| Round | Matchups |
|---|---|
| Round of 16 | (Group winners host second leg, matchups decided by draw): Match A; Match B; Match C; Match D; Match E; Match F; Match G; Match H |
| Quarter-finals | (Higher-seeded team host second leg): Match S1: Winner A vs. Winner H; Match S2: Winner B vs. Winner G; Match S3: Winner C vs. Winner F; Match S4: Winner D vs. Winner E |
| Semi-finals | (Higher-seeded team host second leg): Match F1: Winner S1 vs. Winner S4; Match F2: Winner S2 vs. Winner S3 |
| Final | (Higher-seeded team designated as "home" team): Winner F1 vs. Winner F2 |

The bracket was decided based on the round of 16 draw, which was held on 5 July 2023.

Round of 16
11 | (Uruguayan Football Association) Nacional | 0 | 2 | 2 (2)
4 | (Argentine Football Association) Boca Juniors (p) | 0 | 2 | 2 (4)
15 | (Colombian Football Federation) Atlético Nacional | 4 | 0 | 4
3 | (Argentine Football Association) Racing | 2 | 3 | 5
16 | (Colombian Football Federation) Deportivo Pereira | 1 | 1 | 2
6 | (Ecuadorian Football Federation) Independiente del Valle | 0 | 1 | 1
13 | (Brazilian Football Confederation) Atlético Mineiro | 0 | 0 | 0
1 | (Brazilian Football Confederation) Palmeiras | 1 | 0 | 1
12 | (Argentine Football Association) Argentinos Juniors | 1 | 0 | 1
8 | (Brazilian Football Confederation) Fluminense | 1 | 2 | 3
10 | (Brazilian Football Confederation) Flamengo | 1 | 1 | 2
2 | (Paraguayan Football Association) Olimpia | 0 | 3 | 3
9 | (Bolivian Football Federation) Bolívar (p) | 3 | 0 | 3 (5)
5 | (Brazilian Football Confederation) Athletico Paranaense | 1 | 2 | 3 (4)
14 | (Argentine Football Association) River Plate | 2 | 1 | 3 (8)
7 | (Brazilian Football Confederation) Internacional (p) | 1 | 2 | 3 (9)

Quarter-finals
4 | (Argentine Football Association) Boca Juniors (p) | 0 | 0 | 0 (4)
3 | (Argentine Football Association) Racing | 0 | 0 | 0 (1)
16 | (Colombian Football Federation) Deportivo Pereira | 0 | 0 | 0
1 | (Brazilian Football Confederation) Palmeiras | 4 | 0 | 4
8 | (Brazilian Football Confederation) Fluminense | 2 | 3 | 5
2 | (Paraguayan Football Association) Olimpia | 0 | 1 | 1
9 | (Bolivian Football Federation) Bolívar | 0 | 0 | 0
7 | (Brazilian Football Confederation) Internacional | 1 | 2 | 3

Semi-finals
4 | (Argentine Football Association) Boca Juniors (p) | 0 | 1 | 1 (4)
1 | (Brazilian Football Confederation) Palmeiras | 0 | 1 | 1 (2)
8 | (Brazilian Football Confederation) Fluminense | 2 | 2 | 4
7 | (Brazilian Football Confederation) Internacional | 2 | 1 | 3

Final
4 November – Rio de Janeiro
4 | (Argentine Football Association) Boca Juniors | 1
8 | (Brazilian Football Confederation) Fluminense (a.e.t.) | 2

== Round of 16 ==
=== Summary ===
The first legs were played on 1–3 August, and the second legs were played on 8–10 August 2023.

| Team 1 | Agg. | Team 2 | 1st leg | 2nd leg |
|---|---|---|---|---|
| Atlético Nacional (Colombia) | 4–5 | (Argentina) Racing | 4–2 | 0–3 |
| Bolívar (Bolivia) | 3–3 (5–4 p) | (Brazil) Athletico Paranaense | 3–1 | 0–2 |
| Flamengo (Brazil) | 2–3 | (Paraguay) Olimpia | 1–0 | 1–3 |
| Atlético Mineiro (Brazil) | 0–1 | (Brazil) Palmeiras | 0–1 | 0–0 |
| Deportivo Pereira (Colombia) | 2–1 | (Ecuador) Independiente del Valle | 1–0 | 1–1 |
| Argentinos Juniors (Argentina) | 1–3 | (Brazil) Fluminense | 1–1 | 0–2 |
| River Plate (Argentina) | 3–3 (8–9 p) | (Brazil) Internacional | 2–1 | 1–2 |
| Nacional (Uruguay) | 2–2 (2–4 p) | (Argentina) Boca Juniors | 0–0 | 2–2 |

=== Matches ===
3 August 2023
19:00 UTC−5 (Note: The kickoff time of both legs in Match A was changed from 19:00 UTC−3 (17:00 UTC−5) to 21:00 UTC−3 (19:00 UTC−5).)

| Atlético Nacional (Colombian Football Federation) | 4–2 | (Argentine Football Association) Racing |
|---|---|---|
| Zapata 34'; Je. Duque 61'; Cantera 83', 90+5' | Report | Piovi 87' (pen.), 90+4' (pen.) |

Estadio Atanasio Girardot, Medellín
Attendance: 28,791
Referee: Braulio Machado (Brazil)
10 August 2023
21:00 UTC−3

| Racing (Argentine Football Association) | 3–0 | (Colombian Football Federation) Atlético Nacional |
|---|---|---|
| Martínez 28'; Ojeda 50'; Aguirre 56' (o.g.) | Report |

Estadio Presidente Perón, Avellaneda
Attendance: 38,731
Referee: Jesús Valenzuela (Venezuela)

Racing won 5–4 on aggregate and advanced to the quarter-finals (Match S1).

1 August 2023
20:00 UTC−4

| Bolívar (Bolivian Football Federation) | 3–1 | (Brazilian Football Confederation) Athletico Paranaense |
|---|---|---|
| Fernández 13', 76'; Bejarano 27' | Report | Erick 9' |

Estadio Hernando Siles, La Paz
Attendance: 26,320
Referee: Guillermo Guerrero (Ecuador)
8 August 2023
21:00 UTC−3

| Athletico Paranaense (Brazilian Football Confederation) | 2–0 | (Bolivian Football Federation) Bolívar |
|---|---|---|
| Fernandinho 31' (pen.); Vitor Roque 67' | Report |
Penalties
| Cirino (penalty scored); Vitor Bueno (penalty scored); Fernandinho (penalty scored); Vidal (penalty scored); Thiago Heleno (penalty missed) | 4–5 | (penalty scored) Bejarano; (penalty scored) Justiniano; (penalty scored) Saucedo; (penalty scored) Algarañaz; (penalty scored) Bruno Sávio |

Arena da Baixada, Curitiba
Attendance: 31,972
Referee: Kevin Ortega (Peru)

Tied 3–3 on aggregate, Bolívar won on penalties and advanced to the quarter-finals (Match S2).

3 August 2023
21:00 UTC−3

| Flamengo (Brazilian Football Confederation) | 1–0 | (Paraguayan Football Association) Olimpia |
|---|---|---|
| Bruno Henrique 49' | Report |

Estádio do Maracanã, Rio de Janeiro
Attendance: 67,066
Referee: Darío Herrera (Argentina)
10 August 2023
20:00 UTC−4

| Olimpia (Paraguayan Football Association) | 3–1 | (Brazilian Football Confederation) Flamengo |
|---|---|---|
| I. Torres 12'; Ortiz 69'; Bruera 80' | Report | Bruno Henrique 8' |

Estadio Defensores del Chaco, Asunción (Note: Olimpia played their home matches at Estadio Defensores del Chaco, Asunción instead of their regular stadium Estadio Manuel Ferreira, Asunción.)
Referee: Wilmar Roldán (Colombia)

Olimpia won 3–2 on aggregate and advanced to the quarter-finals (Match S3).

2 August 2023
21:30 UTC−3

| Atlético Mineiro (Brazilian Football Confederation) | 0–1 | (Brazilian Football Confederation) Palmeiras |
|---|---|---|
| | Report | Veiga 29' |

Mineirão, Belo Horizonte
Attendance: 52,587
Referee: Facundo Tello (Argentina)
9 August 2023
21:30 UTC−3

| Palmeiras (Brazilian Football Confederation) | 0–0 | (Brazilian Football Confederation) Atlético Mineiro |
|---|---|---|
| | Report |

Allianz Parque, São Paulo
Referee: Fernando Rapallini (Argentina)

Palmeiras won 1–0 on aggregate and advanced to the quarter-finals (Match S4).

2 August 2023
19:00 UTC−5

| Deportivo Pereira (Colombian Football Federation) | 1–0 | (Ecuadorian Football Federation) Independiente del Valle |
|---|---|---|
| Santacruz 58' | Report |

Estadio Hernán Ramírez Villegas, Pereira
Attendance: 13,733
Referee: Yael Falcón Pérez (Argentina)
9 August 2023
19:00 UTC−5

| Independiente del Valle (Ecuadorian Football Federation) | 1–1 | (Colombian Football Federation) Deportivo Pereira |
|---|---|---|
| Hoyos 6' | Report | Angulo 50' |

Estadio Olímpico Atahualpa, Quito (Note: Independiente del Valle played their home match at Estadio Olímpico Atahualpa, Quito instead of their regular stadium Estadio Banco Guayaquil, Quito which did not meet CONMEBOL requirements.)
Attendance: 16,654
Referee: Darío Herrera (Argentina)

Deportivo Pereira won 2–1 on aggregate and advanced to the quarter-finals (Match S4).

1 August 2023
19:00 UTC−3

| Argentinos Juniors (Argentine Football Association) | 1–1 | (Brazilian Football Confederation) Fluminense |
|---|---|---|
| Ávalos 14' | Report | Samuel Xavier 87' |

Estadio Diego Armando Maradona, Buenos Aires
Attendance: 7,860
Referee: Piero Maza (Chile)
8 August 2023
19:00 UTC−3

| Fluminense (Brazilian Football Confederation) | 2–0 | (Argentine Football Association) Argentinos Juniors |
|---|---|---|
| Samuel Xavier 86'; John Kennedy 90+7' | Report |

Estádio do Maracanã, Rio de Janeiro
Referee: Alexis Herrera (Venezuela)

Fluminense won 3–1 on aggregate and advanced to the quarter-finals (Match S3).

1 August 2023
21:00 UTC−3

| River Plate (Argentine Football Association) | 2–1 | (Brazilian Football Confederation) Internacional |
|---|---|---|
| Solari 65', 79' | Report | Valencia 45+1' |

Estadio Monumental, Buenos Aires
Attendance: 64,696
Referee: Jesús Valenzuela (Venezuela)
8 August 2023
21:00 UTC−3

| Internacional (Brazilian Football Confederation) | 2–1 | (Argentine Football Association) River Plate |
|---|---|---|
| Mercado 70'; Alan Patrick 78' | Report | Rojas 90' |
Penalties
| Luiz Adriano (penalty scored); Valencia (penalty scored); Bruno Henrique (penalty scored); Pedro Henrique (penalty scored); Renê (penalty scored); Mercado (penalty scored); De Pena (penalty missed); Johnny (penalty scored); Gomes (penalty scored); Rochet (penalty scored) | 9–8 | (penalty scored) Palavecino; (penalty scored) Beltrán; (penalty scored) Fernández; (penalty scored) De la Cruz; (penalty scored) Colidio; (penalty scored) Aliendro; (penalty missed) Solari; (penalty scored) E. Díaz; (penalty scored) P. Díaz; (penalty missed) Rojas |

Estádio Beira-Rio, Porto Alegre
Attendance: 50,479
Referee: Andrés Matonte (Uruguay)

Tied 3–3 on aggregate, Internacional won on penalties and advanced to the quarter-finals (Match S2).

2 August 2023
21:00 UTC−3

| Nacional (Uruguayan Football Association) | 0–0 | (Argentine Football Association) Boca Juniors |
|---|---|---|
| | Report |

Estadio Gran Parque Central, Montevideo
Attendance: 32,524
Referee: Raphael Claus (Brazil)
9 August 2023
21:00 UTC−3

| Boca Juniors (Argentine Football Association) | 2–2 | (Uruguayan Football Association) Nacional |
|---|---|---|
| Merentiel 12'; Advíncula 47' | Report | Trezza 16'; Ramírez 75' |
Penalties
| Zeballos (penalty scored); Benedetto (penalty scored); Valentini (penalty scored); G. Fernández (penalty missed); Barco (penalty scored) | 4–2 | (penalty missed) Ramírez; (penalty scored) Polenta; (penalty missed) Bocanegra; (penalty scored) Gigliotti |

Estadio Alberto J. Armando, Buenos Aires
Attendance: 49,780
Referee: Anderson Daronco (Brazil)

Tied 2–2 on aggregate, Boca Juniors won on penalties and advanced to the quarter-finals (Match S1).

== Quarter-finals ==
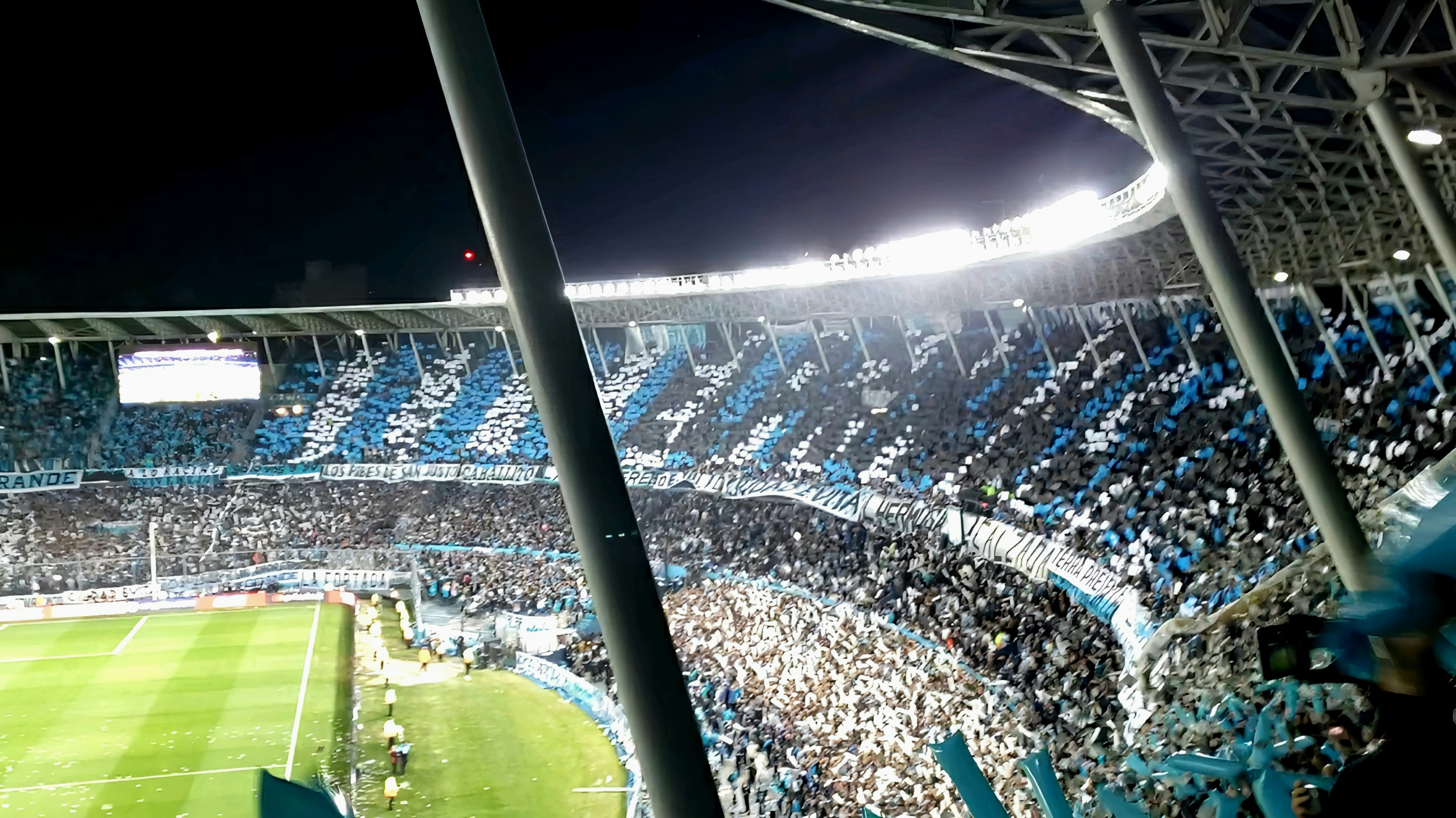
Racing vs. Boca Juniors, Quarter-finals match (30 August 2023)

=== Summary ===
The first legs were played on 22–24 August, and the second legs were played on 29–31 August 2023.

| Team 1 | Agg. | Team 2 | 1st leg | 2nd leg |
|---|---|---|---|---|
| Boca Juniors (Argentina) | 0–0 (4–1 p) | (Argentina) Racing | 0–0 | 0–0 |
| Bolívar (Bolivia) | 0–3 | (Brazil) Internacional | 0–1 | 0–2 |
| Fluminense (Brazil) | 5–1 | (Paraguay) Olimpia | 2–0 | 3–1 |
| Deportivo Pereira (Colombia) | 0–4 | (Brazil) Palmeiras | 0–4 | 0–0 |

=== Matches ===
23 August 2023
21:30 UTC−3

| Boca Juniors (Argentine Football Association) | 0–0 | (Argentine Football Association) Racing |
|---|---|---|
| | Report |

Estadio Alberto J. Armando, Buenos Aires
Referee: Wilton Sampaio (Brazil)
30 August 2023
21:30 UTC−3

| Racing (Argentine Football Association) | 0–0 | (Argentine Football Association) Boca Juniors |
|---|---|---|
| | Report |
Penalties
| Piovi (penalty missed); Quintero (penalty scored); Sigali (penalty missed) | 1–4 | (penalty scored) Zeballos; (penalty scored) Janson; (penalty scored) Cavani; (penalty scored) Rojo |

Estadio Presidente Perón, Avellaneda
Attendance: 41,597
Referee: Andrés Matonte (Uruguay)

Tied 0–0 on aggregate, Boca Juniors won on penalties and advanced to the semi-finals (Match F1).

22 August 2023
18:00 UTC−4

| Bolívar (Bolivian Football Federation) | 0–1 | (Brazilian Football Confederation) Internacional |
|---|---|---|
| | Report | Valencia 16' |

Estadio Hernando Siles, La Paz
Attendance: 36,054
Referee: Darío Herrera (Argentina)
29 August 2023
19:00 UTC−3

| Internacional (Brazilian Football Confederation) | 2–0 | (Bolivian Football Federation) Bolívar |
|---|---|---|
| Valencia 11', 60' | Report |

Estádio Beira-Rio, Porto Alegre
Attendance: 49,137
Referee: Esteban Ostojich (Uruguay)

Internacional won 3–0 on aggregate and advanced to the semi-finals (Match F2).

24 August 2023
21:30 UTC−3

| Fluminense (Brazilian Football Confederation) | 2–0 | (Paraguayan Football Association) Olimpia |
|---|---|---|
| André 43'; Cano 59' | Report |

Estádio do Maracanã, Rio de Janeiro
Attendance: 64,047
Referee: Andrés Matonte (Uruguay)
31 August 2023
20:30 UTC−4

| Olimpia (Paraguayan Football Association) | 1–3 | (Brazilian Football Confederation) Fluminense |
|---|---|---|
| Zabala 44' | Report | John Kennedy 24'; Cano 80', 90+1' |

Estadio Defensores del Chaco, Asunción
Attendance: 34,793
Referee: Jesús Valenzuela (Venezuela)

Fluminense won 5–1 on aggregate and advanced to the semi-finals (Match F2).

23 August 2023
19:30 UTC−5

| Deportivo Pereira (Colombian Football Federation) | 0–4 | (Brazilian Football Confederation) Palmeiras |
|---|---|---|
| | Report | Veiga 23' (pen.); Rocha 31'; Mayke 34'; Rony 82' |

Estadio Hernán Ramírez Villegas, Pereira
Attendance: 22,789
Referee: Facundo Tello (Argentina)
30 August 2023
21:30 UTC−3

| Palmeiras (Brazilian Football Confederation) | 0–0 | (Colombian Football Federation) Deportivo Pereira |
|---|---|---|
| | Report |

Allianz Parque, São Paulo
Attendance: 37,785
Referee: Cristian Garay (Chile)

Palmeiras won 4–0 on aggregate and advanced to the semi-finals (Match F1).

== Semi-finals ==
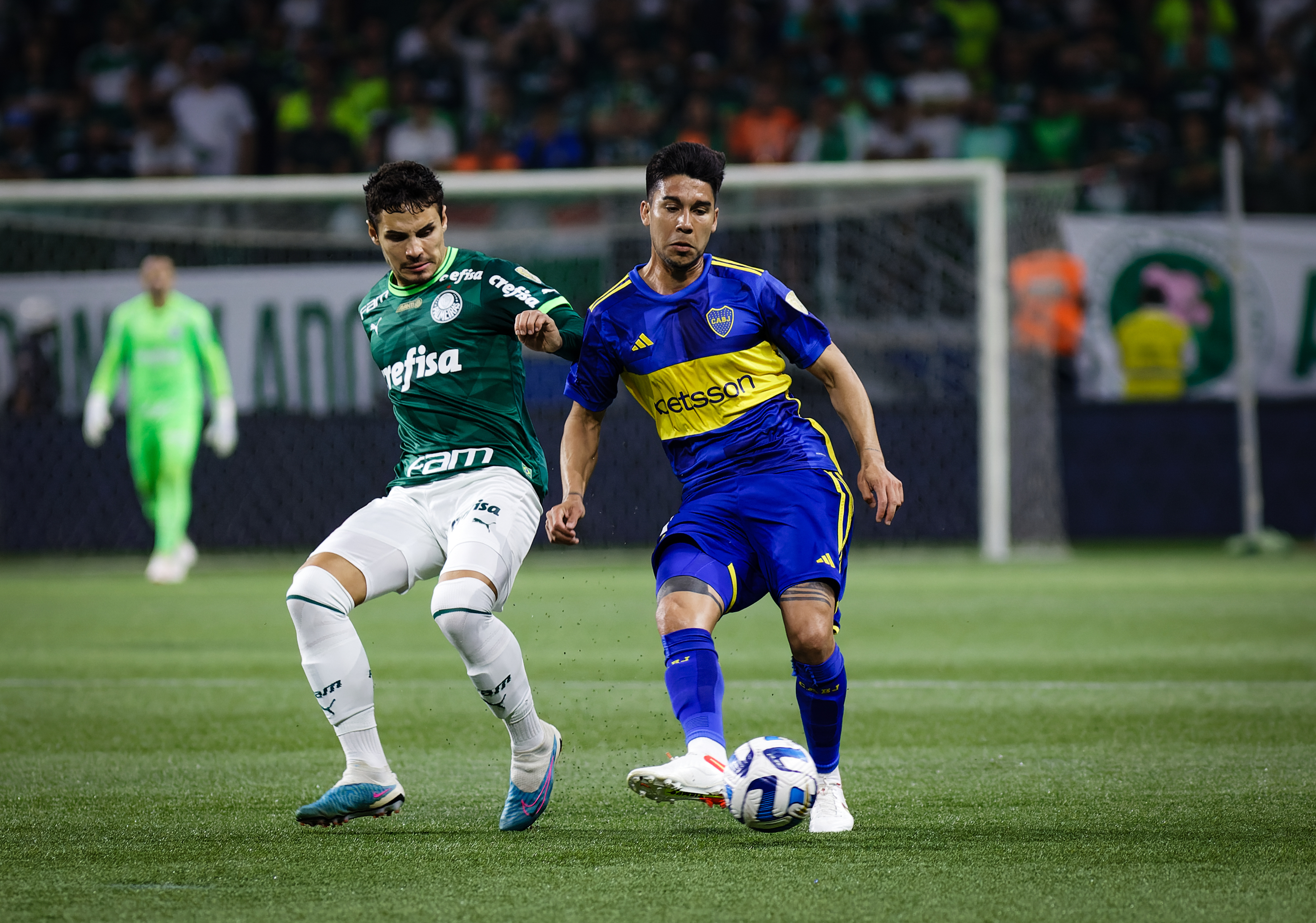
Palmeiras vs. Boca Juniors, Semi-finals match (5 October 2023)

=== Summary ===
The first legs were played on 27 and 28 September, and the second legs were played on 4 and 5 October 2023.

| Team 1 | Agg. | Team 2 | 1st leg | 2nd leg |
|---|---|---|---|---|
| Boca Juniors (Argentina) | 1–1 (4–2 p) | (Brazil) Palmeiras | 0–0 | 1–1 |
| Fluminense (Brazil) | 4–3 | (Brazil) Internacional | 2–2 | 2–1 |

=== Matches ===
28 September 2023
21:30 UTC−3

| Boca Juniors (Argentine Football Association) | 0–0 | (Brazilian Football Confederation) Palmeiras |
|---|---|---|
| | Report |

Estadio Alberto J. Armando, Buenos Aires
Attendance: 53,615
Referee: Wilmar Roldán (Colombia)
5 October 2023
21:30 UTC−3

| Palmeiras (Brazilian Football Confederation) | 1–1 | (Argentine Football Association) Boca Juniors |
|---|---|---|
| Piquerez 73' | Report | Cavani 23' |
Penalties
| Veiga (penalty missed); Gómez (penalty missed); Kevin (penalty scored); Piquerez (penalty scored) | 2–4 | (penalty missed) Cavani; (penalty scored) Valdez; (penalty scored) Valentini; (penalty scored) Figal; (penalty scored) G. Fernández |

Allianz Parque, São Paulo
Attendance: 40,398
Referee: Andrés Matonte (Uruguay)

Tied 1–1 on aggregate, Boca Juniors won on penalties and advanced to the final.

27 September 2023
21:30 UTC−3

| Fluminense (Brazilian Football Confederation) | 2–2 | (Brazilian Football Confederation) Internacional |
|---|---|---|
| Cano 10', 78' | Report | Mallo 45+5'; Alan Patrick 64' |

Estádio do Maracanã, Rio de Janeiro
Attendance: 67,515
Referee: Darío Herrera (Argentina)
4 October 2023
21:30 UTC−3

| Internacional (Brazilian Football Confederation) | 1–2 | (Brazilian Football Confederation) Fluminense |
|---|---|---|
| Mercado 10' | Report | John Kennedy 81'; Cano 87' |

Estádio Beira-Rio, Porto Alegre
Attendance: 50,002
Referee: Jesús Valenzuela (Venezuela)

Fluminense won 4–3 on aggregate and advanced to the final.

== Final ==
The final was played on 4 November 2023 at Maracanã Stadium in Rio de Janeiro.

4 November 2023
17:00 UTC−3

| Boca Juniors (Argentina) | 1–2 (a.e.t.) | (Brazil) Fluminense |
|---|---|---|
| Advíncula 72' | Report | Cano 36'; John Kennedy 99' |

Maracanã, Rio de Janeiro
Attendance: 69,232
Referee: Wilmar Roldán (Colombia)
