= Mateo Levato =

Argentine footballer (born 1996)

Personal information
- Date of birth: 20 January 1996 (age 30)
- Place of birth: Pergamino, Argentina
- Height: 1.89 m (6 ft 2 in)
- Position: Forward

Team information
- Current team: Montevideo Wanderers

Youth career
- Douglas Haig

Senior career*
Years	Team	Apps	(Gls)
2016	Argentino de Pergamino	12	(2)
2017–2021	Los Andes	14	(1)
2019–2020	→ Flandria (loan)	16	(7)
2021–2022	Deportivo Morón	52	(7)
2023	Patronato	25	(4)
2024	Ferro Carril Oeste	35	(10)
2025	Delfín	17	(1)
2025	Universidad de Concepción	12	(2)
2026–	Montevideo Wanderers	0	(0)
- * Club domestic league appearances and goals as of 31 January 2026

Mateo Levato (born 7 June 1996) is an Argentine professional footballer who plays as a forward for Uruguayan club Montevideo Wanderers.

== Career ==
Levato had a youth stint with Douglas Haig. His first taste of senior football arrived in 2016 with Torneo Federal C and Torneo Federal B's Argentino Pergamino, scoring two goals across twelve fixtures in the latter as they suffered relegation back down. In 2017, Levato completed a move to Primera B Nacional side Los Andes. He made his professional league bow on 17 July against San Martín, which was followed by his opening goal for the club two weeks later in a draw away to Estudiantes. After six appearances off the bench, Levato started for the first time in a match with Guillermo Brown in October 2018.

After relegation in 2018–19, Levato spent the 2019–20 campaign out on loan in Primera B Metropolitana with Flandria. His first appearance arrived on 13 October against Deportivo Armenio, before scoring his opening goal for them against parent club Los Andes on 11 November. More goals followed versus Defensores Unidos, Talleres (2), Acassuso, Almirante Brown and Sacachispas in a season that was ended early due to the COVID-19 pandemic.

On 1 July 2021, Levato joined Deportivo Morón.

In the second half of 2025, Levato moved to Chile and signed with Universidad de Concepción, winning the 2025 Liga de Ascenso.

In January 2026, Levato signed with Uruguayan club Montevideo Wanderers.

== Personal life ==
Levato is the nephew of former professional footballers Diego and Mauricio, who both played in the Primera División with Los Andes in the early 2000s.

== Career statistics ==
As of 18 May 2025.

Appearances and goals by club, season and competition
Club	Division	League			Cup		Continental		Total	
Club	Division	Season	Apps	Goals	Apps	Goals	Apps	Goals	Apps	Goals
Argentino Pergamino	Torneo Federal B	2016	12	2	—		—		12	2
Los Andes	Primera B Nacional	2016-17	2	1	0	0	—		2	1
Los Andes	Primera B Nacional	2017-18	1	0	—		—		1	0
Los Andes	Primera B Nacional	2018-19	11	0	—		—		11	0
Los Andes	Total		14	1	0	0	0	0	14	1
Flandria	Primera B Metropolitana	2019-20	16	7	—		—		16	7
Deportivo Morón	Primera B Nacional	2021	18	3	0	0	—		18	3
Deportivo Morón	Primera B Nacional	2022	33	4	1	0	—		34	4
Deportivo Morón	Total		51	7	1	0	0	0	52	7
Patronato	Primera B Nacional	2023	26	3	—		3	2	29	5
Ferro	Primera B Nacional	2024	35	10	—		—		35	10
Delfín S. C.	Ecuadorian Serie A	2025	11	1	0	0	—		11	1
Career total			165	31	1	0	3	2	169	33

== Honours ==
Universidad de Concepción

- Primera B de Chile: 2025
