= John Kennedy (footballer, born 2002) =

Brazilian footballer (born 2002)

Personal information
- Full name: John Kennedy Batista de Souza
- Date of birth: 18 May 2002 (age 24)
- Place of birth: Itaúna, Brazil
- Height: 1.73 m (5 ft 8 in)
- Position: Forward

Team information
- Current team: Fluminense
- Number: 9

Youth career
- –2016: Serrano-RJ
- 2016–2021: Fluminense

Senior career*
Years	Team	Apps	(Gls)
2021–	Fluminense	130	(27)
2023	→ Ferroviária (loan)	11	(6)
2025	→ Pachuca (loan)	20	(9)
- * Club domestic league appearances and goals as of 29 May 2026

John Kennedy Batista de Souza (born 18 May 2002), known as John Kennedy, is a Brazilian professional footballer who plays as a forward for Fluminense.

== Club career ==
=== Fluminense ===
Born in Itaúna, Minas Gerais, Kennedy joined Fluminense's youth setup in 2016, aged 14, from Serrano-RJ. On 29 September 2020, he renewed his contract with the club until 2024. Kennedy made his first team – and Série A – debut on 20 January 2021; after coming on as a half-time substitute for fellow youth graduate Luiz Henrique, he scored his team's first in a 3–3 away draw against Coritiba. Later that year on 23 October, he scored a brace in a 3–1 home win over rivals Flamengo.

On 4 November 2023, Kennedy scored the winning goal for Fluminense in a 2–1 victory over Boca Juniors after extra time in the Copa Libertadores final in what was his club's first title in that competition. A month later on 18 December, he scored a goal in the 90th minute in a 2–0 victory over Al Ahly in the FIFA Club World Cup semi-finals.

==== Loan to Pachuca ====
On 6 January 2025, Kennedy joined Mexican club Pachuca on a one-year loan. On 14 July, his loan was terminated.

== Career statistics ==
As of 31 May 2026

Club	Season	League			State league (Note: Includes Campeonato Carioca, Campeonato Paulista)		National cup (Note: Includes Copa do Brasil)		Continental		Other		Total	
Club	Season	Division	Apps	Goals	Apps	Goals	Apps	Goals	Apps	Goals	Apps	Goals	Apps	Goals
Fluminense	2020	Série A	7	2	0	0	0	0	—		—		7	2
Fluminense	2021	Série A	13	2	8	2	1	0	0	0	—		22	4
Fluminense	2022	Série A	6	0	0	0	1	0	1 (Note: Appearance in Copa Sudamericana)	0	—		8	0
Fluminense	2023	Série A	26	6	—		3	1	10 (Note: Appearances in Copa Libertadores)	4	2 (Note: Appearances in FIFA Club World Cup)	1	41	12
Fluminense	2024	Série A	22	0	4	1	3	1	4	1	1 (Note: Appearance in Recopa Sudamericana)	0	34	3
Fluminense	2025	Série A	17	2	—		1	0	2	0	—		20	2
Fluminense	2026	Série A	17	9	10	3	2	0	6	2	—		35	14
Fluminense	Total		108	21	22	6	11	2	23	7	3	1	167	37
Ferroviária (loan)	2023	Série D	—		11	6	—		—		—		11	6
Pachuca (loan)	2024–25	Liga MX	20	9	—		—		—		2	0	22	9
Career total			128	30	33	12	11	2	23	7	5	1	200	52

== Honours ==
Fluminense

- Campeonato Carioca: 2023
- Copa Libertadores: 2023
- Recopa Sudamericana: 2024
