= Rubén Bentancourt =

Uruguayan footballer (born 1993)

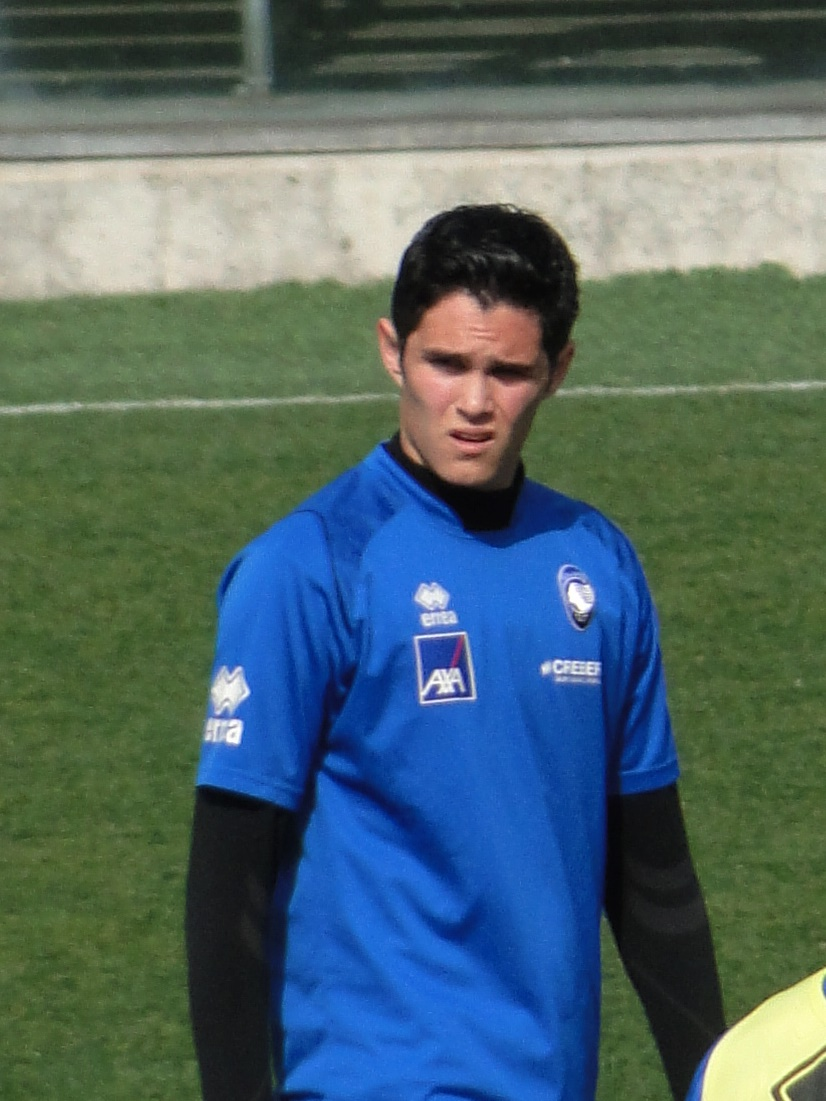
- Bentancourt with Atalanta in 2014

Personal information
- Full name: Rubén Daniel Bentancourt Morales
- Date of birth: 2 March 1993 (age 33)
- Place of birth: Salto, Uruguay
- Height: 1.85 m (6 ft 1 in)
- Position: Forward

Team information
- Current team: Liverpool Montevideo
- Number: 11

Youth career
- Danubio
- PSV

Senior career*
Years	Team	Apps	(Gls)
2013–2014	Jong PSV	19	(1)
2014–2016	Atalanta	3	(0)
2014–2015	→ Bologna (loan)	5	(0)
2015	→ Defensor Sporting (loan)	8	(0)
2015–2016	→ Arezzo (loan)	29	(4)
2016–2017	Defensa y Justicia	0	(0)
2017	Paraná	0	(0)
2017	Sud América	17	(10)
2018–2019	Independiente Santa Fe	15	(1)
2019–2020	Atlante	6	(0)
2020–2021	Boston River	35	(14)
2021–2023	Peñarol	43	(12)
2023–2024	Liverpool Montevideo	31	(13)
2024–2025	Nacional	30	(9)
2025–2026	Argentinos Juniors	9	(0)
2026–	Liverpool Montevideo	4	(0)

International career
2012–2013	Uruguay U20	12	(5)
- * Club domestic league appearances and goals as of 18:42, 7 March 2026 (UTC)

Rubén Daniel Bentancourt Morales (born 2 March 1993) is a Uruguayan professional footballer who plays as a forward for Liverpool Montevideo.

== Career ==
Bentancourt made his professional debut as Jong PSV player in the second division on 19 August 2013 against FC Oss.

On 31 January 2014, he moved from PSV to Serie A side Atalanta for an undisclosed fee.

On 5 August 2014, Atalanta signed Rolando Bianchi from Bologna in a temporary deal, with Bentancourt moved to opposite direction on loan.

On 9 February 2015, he was loaned out by Uruguayan club Defensor Sporting.

On 15 July 2016, he was released by Atalanta.

On 2 September he was signed by Argentine club Defensa y Justicia.

On 28 December 2017, he was signed by Colombian club Independiente Santa Fe.

On 2 August 2021, he joined Peñarol.

== Honours ==
Liverpool F.C. (Montevideo)

- 2023 Uruguayan Primera División season

Peñarol

- Uruguayan Primera División: 2021
- Supercopa Uruguaya: 2022
