= Diego Bejarano =

Bolivian footballer (born 1991)

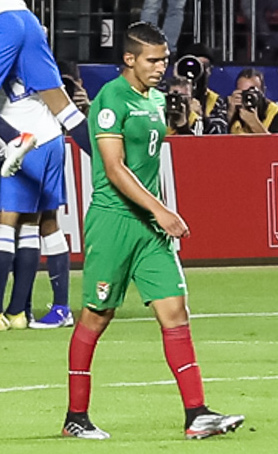
- Bejarano with Bolivia at the 2019 Copa América

Personal information
- Full name: Diego Bejarano Ibáñez
- Date of birth: 24 August 1991 (age 35)
- Place of birth: Santa Cruz de la Sierra, Bolivia
- Height: 1.74 m (5 ft 9 in)
- Positions: Right back; defensive midfielder

Youth career
- –2010: The Strongest

Senior career*
Years	Team	Apps	(Gls)
2010–2014	The Strongest	85	(7)
2012	→ Guabirá (loan)	15	(1)
2014–2016	Panetolikos	27	(2)
2016	→ The Strongest (loan)	14	(3)
2017–2018	The Strongest	60	(18)
2018–2023	Bolívar	141	(16)
2024–2025	Oriente Petrolero	12	(0)

International career^{‡}
2012–	Bolivia	50	(3)
- * Club domestic league appearances and goals as of 02:28, 3 January 2021 (UTC) ‡ National team caps and goals as of 20:16, 25 March 2024 (UTC)

Diego Bejarano Ibáñez (born 24 August 1991) is a Bolivian professional footballer who plays as a right back or defensive midfielder.

== Career ==
=== Club ===
Panetolikos official website announced that the Bolivian international midfielder Diego Bejarano signed a three-year contract with the club as a free agent. Bejarano has international experience at club level as he played in two consecutive years in Copa Libertadores. Bejarano debuted professionally in the Bolivian giant The Strongest, from which he played on loan to Guabirá for the 2012 season, as he was not in the plans of his manager Mauricio Soria.

On 22 September 2014, he debuted in the Greek Super League Greece with the club, in a 1–0 home loss against PAOK. In April 2015, Bejarano in an interview stated that is enjoyed the first eight months in European football, so he wants to stay many years playing football in Europe. His impressive displays against the giants of Greek Super League, named Olympiacos, Panathinaikos and PAOK was an asset for his club, but also attracted their interest."I am satisfied so far, I have played 25 games out of 32 for the club and scored two goals". His agent, Argentinian Alejandro de Bartolo stated that "as the Greek league ends on 10 May, we will see whether he stays at the club or move to another Greek club". Bejarano stated that "...although the Greek Super League is not the most popular league in Europe and his club is not the most popular, fans are very passionate and often games are played to packed stadiums." Panetolikos defensive midfielder will be in contention for the first two games in the Super League Greece play-offs as he is set to travel to Bolivia late in May in order to start preparations for the Copa América. The Bolivian midfielder revealed that he will fly to his homeland on 27 May in order to be in contention with his National Team ahead of the tournament in Latin America which goes underway two weeks later.

On 5 January 2016, Panetolikos announced that Bejarano would be returning to Bolivia for six months to play for The Strongest.

=== International ===
Bejarano has represented Bolivia at youth level. On 15 November 2012, Bejarano debuted for the Bolivia National team in 1–1 friendly international home draw against Costa Rica. As of 7 June 2016, Bejarano earned 13 caps for Bolivia and he represented his country in 6 FIFA World Cup qualification matches.

=== International goals ===
Scores and results list Bolivia's goal tally first.

No	Date	Venue	Opponent	Score	Result	Competition
1.	15 October 2013	Estadio Nacional de Lima, Lima, Peru	Peru	1–1	1–1	2014 FIFA World Cup qualification
2.	7 June 2017	Estadio Provincial de Yacuíba, Yacuíba, Bolivia	Nicaragua	1–2	3–2	Friendly
3.	3 June 2021	Estadio Hernando Siles, La Paz, Bolivia	Venezuela	2–1	3–1	2022 FIFA World Cup qualification

== Honours ==
The Strongest Liga de Fútbol Profesional Boliviano: Apertura 2013, 2014
