= Luciano Pons =

Argentine footballer

Personal information
- Full name: Luciano Daniel Pons
- Date of birth: 18 April 1990 (age 36)
- Place of birth: Rosario, Argentina
- Height: 1.80 m (5 ft 11 in)
- Position: Forward

Team information
- Current team: Atlético Bucaramanga
- Number: 27

Youth career
- Tiro Federal
- 2006–2008: Argentino de Rosario

Senior career*
Years	Team	Apps	(Gls)
2009–2014	Argentino de Rosario	107	(37)
2012	→ Aragua (loan)	7	(2)
2013	→ Jorge Newbery VT (loan)	–	(–)
2014–2015	San Miguel	50	(34)
2015–2017	Atlanta	30	(13)
2017–2018	Flandria	22	(10)
2018–2020	San Martín Tucumán	32	(16)
2020–2021	Banfield	41	(5)
2022–2023	Independiente Medellín	96	(25)
2024–2025	Universidad de Chile	22	(3)
2025	→ Atlético Bucaramanga (loan)	39	(18)
2026–	Atlético Bucaramanga	35	(15)
- * Club domestic league appearances and goals as of 5 January 2026

Luciano Daniel Pons (born 18 April 1990) is an Argentine professional footballer who plays as a forward for Categoría Primera A club Atlético Bucaramanga.

== Career ==
As a youth player, Pons was with Tiro Federal. Pons' career started in 2009 with Argentino, who he remained with for five years whilst scoring thirty-seven goals in one hundred and seven league appearances; in Primera C Metropolitana and Primera D Metropolitana up until 2014. In 2012, Pons joined Venezuelan Primera División side Aragua on loan. He scored two goals, versus Deportivo Anzoátegui and Estudiantes (M), in seven matches for the club. After returning to Argentino, he was loaned to Torneo Argentino B team Jorge Newbery. San Miguel signed Pons on 30 June 2014. He subsequently scored thirty-four times across two seasons.

Pons then completed a move to Primera B Metropolitana's Atlanta ahead of the 2016 campaign. He scored on his second start, netting the winning goal against Estudiantes (BA) on 27 February. That was the opening of eight in his debut season, which preceded a further five in the following 2016–17. August 2017 saw Pons join Flandria of Primera B Nacional.

He scored ten goals for Flandria, including one against eventual champions San Martín who ended up signing Pons ahead of their return to the Argentine Primera División on 1 July 2018. He scored four goals in the top-flight, although they suffered relegation. He remained with San Martín in Primera B Nacional, going on to net twelve goals across the 2019–20 campaign; which included a hat-trick in a 4–1 victory over Quilmes on 14 October 2019. The club were sat top of the table at the time of the season's curtailment due to the COVID-19 pandemic. In August 2020, Pons joined Primera División team Banfield.

On 11 January 2022, Pons joined Colombian club Independiente Medellín on a deal for the rest of the year. He made his debut on 30 January, scoring a brace in a 2–0 win against Deportivo Cali. In total Pons scored 10 goals in the 2022 Apertura, placing third in the top scorers chart as Medellin made the playoffs. Pons had another good season in the 2022 Finalizacion, scoring seven goals, including winning goals against rivals Atlético Nacional and Águilas Doradas as Medellin qualified to the 2022 Finalizacion finals, with the striker playing both legs as Medellin finished runner-up, losing on penalties.

In 2024, Pons moved to Chile and signed with Universidad de Chile. In 2025, he was loaned out to Colombian club Atlético Bucaramanga and renewed with them until the 2028 season.

== Career statistics ==
As of 10 August 2025.

Club statistics
Club	Division	League			Cup		Continental		Total	
Club	Division	Season	Apps	Goals	Apps	Goals	Apps	Goals	Apps	Goals
Argentino de Rosario	Primera C Metropolitana	2009-10	21	3	—		—		21	3
Argentino de Rosario	Primera D Metropolitana	2010-11	27	9	—		—		27	9
Argentino de Rosario	Primera D Metropolitana	2011-12	25	12	1	0	—		26	12
Argentino de Rosario	Primera D Metropolitana	2013-14	28	12	1	0	—		29	12
Argentino de Rosario	Total		101	36	2	0	0	0	103	36
Aragua	Venezuelan Primera División	2012-13	7	2	—		—		7	2
San Miguel	Primera D Metropolitana	2014	16	8	—		—		16	8
San Miguel	Primera C Metropolitana	2015	35	24	—		—		35	24
San Miguel	Total		51	32	0	0	0	0	51	32
Atlanta	Primera B Metropolitana	2016-17	31	13	1	0	—		32	13
Flandria	Primera B Nacional	2017-18	22	10	—		—		22	10
San Martín Tucumán	Argentine Primera División	2018-19	12	4	1	0	—		13	4
San Martín Tucumán	Primera B Nacional	2019-20	20	12	2	0	—		22	12
San Martín Tucumán	Total		32	16	3	0	0	0	35	16
Banfield	Argentine Primera División	2020-21	—		12	4	—		12	4
Banfield	Argentine Primera División	2021	21	1	11	2	—		32	3
Banfield	Total		21	1	23	6	0	0	44	7
Independiente Medellín	Categoría Primera A	2022	49	17	4	1	7	2	60	20
Independiente Medellín	Categoría Primera A	2023	47	8	4	1	12	5	63	14
Independiente Medellín	Total		96	25	8	2	19	7	123	34
Universidad de Chile	Chilean Primera División	2024	22	3	5	1	—		27	4
Atlético Bucaramanga	Categoría Primera A	2025	18	11	4	2	7	3	29	16
Career total			401	149	46	11	26	10	473	170

== Personal life ==
At the beginning of his football career, he also worked as a builder.
