= Football at the 2022 South American Games – Men's tournament =

Men's football at the 2022 South American Games
Tournament details
- Host country: Paraguay
- Dates: 4–12 October
- Teams: 8
- Venue: 1 (in 1 host city)

Final positions
- Champions: Paraguay (2nd title)
- Runners-up: Ecuador
- Third place: Colombia
- Fourth place: Uruguay

Tournament statistics
- Matches played: 16
- Goals scored: 49 (3.06 per match)
- Top scorer: (Paraguay) Allan Wlk (6 goals)

The men's tournament of the football at the 2022 South American Games was held from 4 to 12 October 2022 at the Complejo de Fútbol in Luque, Paraguay, a sub-venue outside Asunción. It was the ninth staging of the football men's tournament since its first appearance in the South American Games' first edition in La Paz 1978.

The tournament was officially restricted to under-19 players (born on or after 1 January 2003).

The defending champions Chile were unable to retain their title after being eliminated in the group stage.

Paraguay won the gold medal and their second South American Games men's football title after defeating Ecuador by a 1–0 score in the final. Colombia beat Uruguay 2–1 in the third place match to win the bronze medal.

== Schedule ==
The tournament was held over a 9-day period, from 4 to 12 October.

| GS | Group stage | SF | Semi-finals | B | Bronze medal match | F | Gold medal match |

| Tue 4 | Wed 5 | Thu 6 | Fri 7 | Sat 8 | Sun 9 | Mon 10 | Tue 11 | Sun 12 | |
|---|---|---|---|---|---|---|---|---|---|
| GS | | GS | | GS | | SF | | B | F |
| 4 M | | 4 M | | 4 M | | 2 M | | 2 M | |

== Teams ==
A total of eight ODESUR NOCs entered teams for the men's tournament.

| Teams | App | Previous best performance |
|---|---|---|
| Argentina | 5th | Gold medal (1982, 1986) |
| Ecuador | 8th | Silver medal (1978, 1982, 1990, 2010) |
| Chile | 7th | Gold medal (2018) |
| Colombia | 7th | Gold medal (2010, 2014) |
| Paraguay | 6th | Gold medal (1978) |
| Peru | 7th | Gold medal (1990) |
| Uruguay | 3rd | Silver medal (2018) |
| Venezuela | 4th | Silver medal (1994) |

=== Squads ===
Each participating NOC had to enter a squad of 18 players (Technical manual Article 9). Players had to be born on or after 1 January 2003 to be eligible (Technical manual Article 1).

== Venue ==
All matches were played at the Complejo de Fútbol courts located within the Parque Olímpico cluster in Luque, Paraguay, owned by the Paraguayan Olympic Committee.

== Results ==
All match times are in PYST (UTC−3).

=== Group stage ===
The group stage consisted of two groups of 4 teams, each group was played under the round-robin format with the top two teams progressing to the semi-finals.

Teams were ranked according to points earned (3 points for a win, 1 point for a draw, 0 points for a loss). If tied on points, the following tiebreakers were applied (Technical manual Article 10.1):

1. Goal difference;
2. Goals scored;
3. Fewest goals against;
4. Fewest red cards received;
5. Fewest yellow cards received;
6. Drawing of lots.

==== Group A ====
| Pos | Team | Pld | W | D | L | GF | GA | GD | Pts | Qualification |
|---|---|---|---|---|---|---|---|---|---|---|
| 1 | Uruguay | 3 | 1 | 2 | 0 | 5 | 3 | +2 | 5 | Advance to semi-finals |
| 2 | Paraguay (H) | 3 | 1 | 1 | 1 | 7 | 3 | +4 | 4 | Advance to semi-finals |
| 3 | Venezuela | 3 | 1 | 1 | 1 | 4 | 4 | 0 | 4 | |
| 4 | Peru | 3 | 0 | 2 | 1 | 2 | 8 | −6 | 2 | |

Source: ASU2022
(H) Hosts
4 October 2022
15:00

| Venezuela | 1–3 | Uruguay |
|---|---|---|
| Kelsy 31' | Report | Chagas 7'; Antoni 45+2'; Mereles 90+3' |

Complejo de Fútbol – court 2, Luque
Attendance: 250
Referee: Jordy Alemán (Bolivia)
4 October 2022
16:00

| Paraguay | 6–0 | Peru |
|---|---|---|
| Wlk 19', 73', 90'; Rolón 26'; Carhuallanqui 29' (o.g.); Pereira 84' | Report |

Complejo de Fútbol – court 1, Luque
Attendance: 1228
Referee: Marlon Vera (Ecuador)

6 October 2022
15:00

| Peru | 1–1 | Venezuela |
|---|---|---|
| Cabellos 36' (pen.) | Report | Chacón 75' (pen.) |

Complejo de Fútbol – court 2, Luque
Attendance: 850
Referee: Jordy Alemán (Bolivia)
6 October 2022
16:07

| Paraguay | 1–1 | Uruguay |
|---|---|---|
| Wlk 90+4' | Report | L. Rodríguez 43' |

Complejo de Fútbol – court 1, Luque
Attendance: 1500
Referee: Marlon Vera (Ecuador)

8 October 2022
9:07

| Paraguay | 0–2 | Venezuela |
|---|---|---|
| | Report | Riasco 25'; Kelsy 57' |

Complejo de Fútbol – court 1, Luque
Attendance: 700
Referee: Jordy Alemán (Bolivia)
8 October 2022
15:00

| Uruguay | 1–1 | Peru |
|---|---|---|
| Ponte 90+2' | Report | Olaya 52' (pen.) |

Complejo de Fútbol – court 2, Luque
Attendance: 450
Referee: Marlon Vera (Ecuador)

==== Group B ====
| Pos | Team | Pld | W | D | L | GF | GA | GD | Pts | Qualification |
|---|---|---|---|---|---|---|---|---|---|---|
| 1 | Colombia | 3 | 2 | 0 | 1 | 7 | 3 | +4 | 6 | Advance to semi-finals |
| 2 | Ecuador | 3 | 2 | 0 | 1 | 5 | 6 | −1 | 6 | Advance to semi-finals |
| 3 | Argentina | 3 | 1 | 0 | 2 | 3 | 3 | 0 | 3 | |
| 4 | Chile | 3 | 1 | 0 | 2 | 2 | 5 | −3 | 3 | |

Source: ASU2022
4 October 2022
9:07

| Ecuador | 3–2 | Colombia |
|---|---|---|
| Cuero 41' (pen.); Sánchez 61'; Arroyo 71' | Report | Castillo 3'; Caraballo 8' |

Complejo de Fútbol – court 1, Luque
Referee: Joel Alarcón (Peru)
4 October 2022
11:15

| Argentina | 0–1 | Chile |
|---|---|---|
| | Report | Matamoros 85' |

Complejo de Fútbol – court 1, Luque
Referee: Giancarlos Juliadoza (Paraguay)

6 October 2022
9:07

| Chile | 1–2 | Ecuador |
|---|---|---|
| Fuentealba 18' (pen.) | Report | Cuero 10'; Klinger 69' |

Complejo de Fútbol – court 1, Luque
Attendance: 450
Referee: Juan López (Paraguay)
6 October 2022
11:22

| Colombia | 2–0 | Argentina |
|---|---|---|
| Monsalve 72', 90' | Report |

Complejo de Fútbol – court 1, Luque
Attendance: 500
Referee: José Uzcátegui (Venezuela)

8 October 2022
11:22

| Ecuador | 0–3 | Argentina |
|---|---|---|
| | Report | Ovando 40'; R. Rodríguez 73'; Besozzi 78' |

Complejo de Fútbol – court 1, Luque
Attendance: 700
Referee: Juan López (Paraguay)
8 October 2022
16:07

| Colombia | 3–0 | Chile |
|---|---|---|
| Monsalve 6' (pen.); Mulato 62'; Girado 79' | Report |

Complejo de Fútbol – court 1, Luque
Attendance: 700
Referee: Giancarlos Juliadoza (Paraguay)

=== Final stage ===
The final stage consisted of the semi-finals and bronze and gold medal matches. The semi-finals match-ups were:

- Semifinal 1: Group B winners v Group A runners-up
- Semifinal 2: Group A winners v Group B runners-up

In the final stage, if a match had been tied after 90 minutes, the match would have been decided by a penalty shoot-out. Winners of semi-finals played the gold medal match, while losers played the bronze medal match.

Semi-finals
10 October
Colombia | 2
Paraguay | 4
10 October
Uruguay | 1
Ecuador | 3

Gold medal match
12 October
Paraguay | 1
Ecuador | 0
Bronze medal match
12 October
Colombia | 2
Uruguay | 1

==== Semi-finals ====
10 October 2022
9:07

| Colombia | 2–4 | Paraguay |
|---|---|---|
| Caraballo 30'; Cortés 72' | Report | Wlk 10'; Pereira 42'; Quintana 60'; Segovia 88' |

Complejo de Fútbol – court 1, Luque
Attendance: 700
Referee: José Uzcátegui (Venezuela)
10 October 2022
16:00

| Uruguay | 1–3 | Ecuador |
|---|---|---|
| Ponte 14' | Report | Cuero 4', 45+3', 56' |

Complejo de Fútbol – court 1, Luque
Attendance: 250
Referee: Joel Alarcón (Peru)

==== Bronze medal match ====
12 October 2022
9:07

| Colombia | 2–1 | Uruguay |
|---|---|---|
| Córdoba 31'; Salazar 90+5' | Report | Sánchez 90+3' |

Complejo de Fútbol – court 1, Luque
Attendance: 650
Referee: Giancarlos Juliadoza (Paraguay)

==== Gold medal match ====
12 October 2022
16:07

| Paraguay | 1–0 | Ecuador |
|---|---|---|
| Wlk 33' | Report |

Complejo de Fútbol – court 1, Luque
Attendance: 1800
Referee: José Uzcátegui (Venezuela)

== Goalscorers ==
There were 49 goals scored in 16 matches, for an average of 3.06 goals per match.

6 goals

- (Paraguay) Allan Wlk

5 goals

- (Ecuador) Justin Cuero

3 goals

- (Colombia) Miguel Monsalve

2 goals

- (Colombia) Ricardo Caraballo
- (Paraguay) Kevin Pereira
- (Uruguay) Mateo Ponte
- (Venezuela) Kevin Kelsy

1 goal

- (Argentina) Lucas Besozzi
- (Argentina) Lautaro Ovando
- (Argentina) Román Rodríguez
- (Chile) Jeison Fuentealba
- (Chile) Nicolás Matamoros
- (Colombia) Juan Córdoba
- (Colombia) Óscar Cortés
- (Colombia) Sebastián Girado
- (Colombia) Alexis Manyoma
- (Colombia) José Mulato
- (Colombia) Andrés Salazar
- (Ecuador) Jean Arroyo
- (Ecuador) José Klinger
- (Ecuador) Juan Sánchez
- (Paraguay) Leonardo Rolón
- (Paraguay) Victor Quintana
- (Paraguay) Matías Segovia'
- (Peru) Catriel Cabellos
- (Peru) Stefano Olaya
- (Uruguay) Mateo Antoni
- (Uruguay) Rodrigo Chagas
- (Uruguay) Exequiel Mereles
- (Uruguay) Luciano Rodríguez
- (Uruguay) Renzo Sánchez
- (Venezuela) Yerson Chacón
- (Venezuela) José Riasco

1 own goal

- (Peru) Jack Carhuallanqui (against Paraguay)

Source: ASU2022

== Final ranking ==
| Rank | Team |
|---|---|
| 1st place, gold medalist(s) | Paraguay |
| 2nd place, silver medalist(s) | Ecuador |
| 3rd place, bronze medalist(s) | Colombia |
| 4 | Uruguay |
| 5 | Venezuela |
| 5 | Argentina |
| 5 | Chile |
| 5 | Peru |

2022 Men's South American Games Football Champions

Paraguay
Second title

Team squad: Ángel González, Alan Núñez, Gilberto Flores, Alexis Cantero, Thiago Servín, Víctor Quintana, Fernando Ovelar, Diego Gómez (c), Allan Wlk, Matías Segovia, Leonardo Rolón, Carlos Urán, Luis Rolón, Nelson Gauto, Leandro Caballero, Blas Duarte, Kevin Pereira, Hugo Benítez
Head coach: Aldo Bobadilla

== Medalists ==
| Gold | Silver | Bronze |
| Paraguay Ángel González; Alan Núñez; Gilberto Flores; Alexis Cantero; Thiago Servín; Víctor Quintana; Fernando Ovelar; Diego Gómez (c); Allan Wlk; Matías Segovia; Leonardo Rolón; Carlos Urán; Luis Rolón; Nelson Gauto; Leandro Caballero; Blas Duarte; Kevin Pereira; Hugo Benítez Head coach: Aldo Bobadilla | Ecuador Tony Jiménez; Randy Meneses; Luis Mario Córdova; Davis Bautista; Denil Castillo (c); Yeltzin Erique; Emerson Pata; Patrik Mercado; Justin Cuero; José Andrés Klinger; Madison Mina; Ethan Minda; Steven Cortez; Orlando Herrera; Gilbert Sánchez; Ariel Suárez; Mathías Solís; Jean Pierre Arroyo Head coach: Jimmy Bran | Colombia Cristian Santander; Daniel Pedrozo; Edier Ocampo; Julián Palacios; Kevin Mantilla (c); Jhon Vélez; Sebastián Girado; Gustavo Puerta; Ricardo Caraballo; Alexis Castillo; José Mulato; Luis Marquinez; Oscar Cortés; Juan José Córdoba; Andrés Salazar; Miguel Monsalve; Stiven Valencia; Daniel Luna Head coach: Héctor Cardenas |

== See also ==
- Football at the 2022 South American Games – Women's tournament
