= Football at the 2022 South American Games =

Football competitions at the 2022 South American Games

- Venue: Complejo de Fútbol, Luque
- Dates: 4−12 October 2022
- Competitors: 252 from 9 nations
- Teams: 14 (8 men and 6 women)

Medalists
| gold medal | Paraguay (men) |
| gold medal | Venezuela (women) |
| silver medal | Ecuador (men) |
| silver medal | Uruguay (women) |
| bronze medal | Colombia (men) |
| bronze medal | Colombia (women) |

Football competitions at the 2022 South American Games in Asunción, Paraguay were held between 4 and 12 October 2022 at the Complejo de Fútbol located within the Parque Olímpico cluster in Luque, a sub-venue apart from Asunción.

Two medal events were scheduled to be contested: a men's and women's tournament. A total of 252 athletes (144 athletes–8 teams for men and 108 athletes–6 teams for women) competed in the events. Both tournaments had age limits, the men's tournament was restricted to under-19 players (born on or after 1 January 2003) while women's tournament was restricted to under-20 players (born on or after 1 January 2002).

Chile and Paraguay were the defending champions of the South American Games men's and women's football events. Both teams won their respective title in the South American Games' previous edition.

Paraguay and Venezuela won the gold medal in the men's and women's events respectively.

== Participating nations ==
A total of 8 ODESUR nations registered teams for the football events. Each nation was able to enter a maximum of 36 athletes (one team of 18 players per gender). Ecuador and Peru competed in the men's event while the other six nations competed in both events.

- Argentina (36 players)
- Chile (36)
- Colombia (36)
- Ecuador (18)
- Paraguay (36)
- Peru (18)
- Uruguay (36)
- Venezuela (36)

== Medal summary ==
=== Medal table ===
* Host nation (Host nation)

| Rank | Nation | Gold | Silver | Bronze | Total |
|---|---|---|---|---|---|
| 1 | Paraguay (PAR)* | 1 | 0 | 0 | 1 |
| 1 | Venezuela (VEN) | 1 | 0 | 0 | 1 |
| 3 | Ecuador (ECU) | 0 | 1 | 0 | 1 |
| 3 | Uruguay (URU) | 0 | 1 | 0 | 1 |
| 5 | Colombia (COL) | 0 | 0 | 2 | 2 |
| Totals (5 entries) | | 2 | 2 | 2 | 6 |

=== Medalists ===
| Event | Gold | Silver | Bronze |
|---|---|---|---|
| Men's tournament | Paraguay (PAR); Alan Núñez; Alexis Cantero; Allan Wlk; Ángel González; Blas Duarte; Carlos Urán; Diego Gómez; Fernando Ovelar; Gilberto Flores; Hugo Benítez; Kevin Pereira; Leandro Caballero; Leonardo Rolón; Luis Rolón; Matías Segovia; Nelson Gauto; Thiago Servín; Víctor Quintana | Ecuador (ECU); Ariel Suárez; Davis Bautista; Denil Castillo; Emerson Pata; Ethan Minda; Jean Pierre Arroyo; José Klinger; Gilbert Sánchez; Justin Cuero; Luis Mario Córdova; Madison Mina; Mathías Solís; Orlando Martínez; Patrik Mercado; Randy Meneses; Steven Cortez; Tony Jiménez; Yeltzin Erique | Colombia (COL); Alexis Castillo; Andrés Salazar; Cristian Santander; Daniel Luna; Daniel Pedrozo; Edier Ocampo; Gustavo Puerta; Jhon Vélez; José Mulato; Juan José Córdoba; Julián Palacios; Kevin Mantilla; Luis Marquinez; Miguel Monsalve; Oscar Cortés; Ricardo Caraballo; Sebastián Girado; Stiven Valencia |
| Women's tournament | Venezuela (VEN); Ana Paula Fraiz; Ashley Pulgar; Bárbara Martínez; Bárbara Olivieri; Daniela Martínez; Fabiola Solórzano; Floriangel Apostol; Gabriela Angulo; Génesis Hernández; Hilary Azuaje; Jaimar Torrealba; Kimberlyn Campos; Maria Duerto; Marianyela Jiménez; Nerimar Infante; Raiderlin Carrasco; Sabrina Araujo-Elorza; Zulaycar Milano | Uruguay (URU); Adriana Salvagno; Agustina Nuñez; Ahelin Piña; Alison Latúa; Ángela Gómez; Belén Aquino; Florencia Ponce; Florencia Méndez; Guillermina Grant; Jennifer Sosa; Julieta Morales; Maria Cufré; Nikol Laurnaga; Oriana Fontan; Solange Lemos; Valentina Pereira; Vanina Sburlati; Wendy Carballo | Colombia (COL); Angie Guarín; Camila Russi; Danna Lambraño; Gabriela Urueña; Greicy Landázury; Kaily Siso; Laura Marcelo; Ledys Calvo; María Reyes; Maria Rojas; Maryluz Montillo; Sandra Ibargüen; Sara Garzon; Sofia Buitrago; Valery Restrepo; Vennus Pineda; Yirleidis Minota; Yunaira López |

== Men's tournament ==
=== Group stage ===
==== Group A ====
| Pos | Team | Pld | W | D | L | GF | GA | GD | Pts | Qualification |
|---|---|---|---|---|---|---|---|---|---|---|
| 1 | Uruguay | 3 | 1 | 2 | 0 | 5 | 3 | +2 | 5 | Advance to semi-finals |
| 2 | Paraguay (H) | 3 | 1 | 1 | 1 | 7 | 3 | +4 | 4 | Advance to semi-finals |
| 3 | Venezuela | 3 | 1 | 1 | 1 | 4 | 4 | 0 | 4 | |
| 4 | Peru | 3 | 0 | 2 | 1 | 2 | 8 | −6 | 2 | |

Source: ASU2022
(H) Hosts

==== Group B ====
| Pos | Team | Pld | W | D | L | GF | GA | GD | Pts | Qualification |
|---|---|---|---|---|---|---|---|---|---|---|
| 1 | Colombia | 3 | 2 | 0 | 1 | 7 | 3 | +4 | 6 | Advance to semi-finals |
| 2 | Ecuador | 3 | 2 | 0 | 1 | 5 | 6 | −1 | 6 | Advance to semi-finals |
| 3 | Argentina | 3 | 1 | 0 | 2 | 3 | 3 | 0 | 3 | |
| 4 | Chile | 3 | 1 | 0 | 2 | 2 | 5 | −3 | 3 | |

Source: ASU2022

=== Final stage ===
Semi-finals
10 October
Colombia | 2
Paraguay | 4
10 October
Uruguay | 1
Ecuador | 3

Gold medal match
12 October
Paraguay | 1
Ecuador | 0
Bronze medal match
12 October
Colombia | 2
Uruguay | 1

=== Final standings ===
| Rank | Team |
|---|---|
| 1st place, gold medalist(s) | Paraguay |
| 2nd place, silver medalist(s) | Ecuador |
| 3rd place, bronze medalist(s) | Colombia |
| 4 | Uruguay |
| 5 | Venezuela |
| 5 | Argentina |
| 5 | Chile |
| 5 | Peru |

== Women's tournament ==
=== Group stage ===
==== Group A ====
| Pos | Team | Pld | W | D | L | GF | GA | GD | Pts | Qualification |
|---|---|---|---|---|---|---|---|---|---|---|
| 1 | Venezuela | 2 | 2 | 0 | 0 | 8 | 0 | +8 | 6 | Advance to gold medal match |
| 2 | Paraguay (H) | 2 | 1 | 0 | 1 | 3 | 6 | −3 | 3 | Advance to bronze medal match |
| 3 | Chile | 2 | 0 | 0 | 2 | 1 | 6 | −5 | 0 | |

Source: ASU2022
(H) Hosts

==== Group B ====
| Pos | Team | Pld | W | D | L | GF | GA | GD | Pts | Qualification |
|---|---|---|---|---|---|---|---|---|---|---|
| 1 | Uruguay | 2 | 2 | 0 | 0 | 7 | 1 | +6 | 6 | Advance to gold medal match |
| 2 | Colombia | 2 | 1 | 0 | 1 | 2 | 3 | −1 | 3 | Advance to bronze medal match |
| 3 | Argentina | 2 | 0 | 0 | 2 | 2 | 7 | −5 | 0 | |

Source: ASU2022

=== Final stage ===
| Bronze medal match |
| 11 October |
| Paraguay | 0 |
| Colombia | 1 |

| Gold medal match |
| 11 October |
| Uruguay | 2 (4) |
| Venezuela (p) | 2 (5) |

=== Final standings ===
| Rank | Team |
|---|---|
| 1st place, gold medalist(s) | Venezuela |
| 2nd place, silver medalist(s) | Uruguay |
| 3rd place, bronze medalist(s) | Colombia |
| 4 | Paraguay |
| 5 | Argentina |
| 5 | Chile |
