= 2024 CONMEBOL Pre-Olympic Tournament squads =

The 2024 CONMEBOL Pre-Olympic Tournament was an international football tournament that was held in Venezuela from 20 January to 11 February 2024. The ten national teams involved in the tournament were required to register a squad of a minimum of 19 and a maximum of 23 players, including at least three goalkeepers (Regulations Article 48). Only players in these squads are eligible to take part in the tournament. The tournament exclusively requires players to be born on or after 1 January 2001 to be eligible, that is, they must be a maximum of 23 years old by the end of the calendar year in which the competition is played (Regulations Article 45).

As the tournament will not held during the FIFA International Match Calendar, clubs were not obligated to release the players.

Each national team had to register its list of up to 23 players in the COMET system and then submit it to CONMEBOL by 5 January 2024, 18:00 PYST (UTC−3) (Regulations Articles 49 and 50). Teams are only permitted to make player replacements in cases of serious injuries or illness up to 48 hours before the start of the tournament (Regulations Article 56). Teams are also permitted to replace an injured goalkeeper with another at any time during the tournament (Regulations Article 57). In addition, any player with positive PCR tests for SARS-CoV-2 may be replaced at any moment before and during the tournament (Regulations Article 59). All the substitutions must have the approval of the CONMEBOL Medical Commission.

The age listed for each player is as of 20 January 2024, the first day of the tournament. A flag is included for coaches who are of a different nationality than their own national team. Players name marked in bold have been capped at full international level.

== Group A ==
=== Venezuela ===
Venezuela announced a preliminary roster of 28 players on 5 January 2024. The final 23-man squad was announced on 18 January 2024.

Head coach: (Argentina) Ricardo Valiño

No.	Pos.	Player	Date of birth (age)	Club
1	GK	Samuel Rodríguez	5 May 2003 (aged 20)	(Royal Spanish Football Federation) Burgos
2	DF	Carlos Vivas (captain)	4 April 2002 (aged 21)	(Venezuelan Football Federation) Deportivo Táchira
3	DF	Rafael Uzcátegui	4 October 2004 (aged 19)	(Colombian Football Federation) Boyacá Chicó
4	DF	Andrés Ferro	2 August 2001 (aged 22)	(Argentine Football Association) Central Córdoba (SdE)
5	MF	Emerson Ruíz	1 March 2003 (aged 20)	(Venezuelan Football Federation) Metropolitanos
6	MF	Bryant Ortega	28 February 2003 (aged 20)	(Venezuelan Football Federation) Caracas
7	MF	Matías Lacava	24 October 2002 (aged 21)	(Portuguese Football Federation) Vizela
8	MF	**Telasco Segovia**	2 April 2003 (aged 20)	(Portuguese Football Federation) Casa Pia
9	FW	Kevin Kelsy	27 July 2004 (aged 19)	(Ukrainian Association of Football) Shakhtar Donetsk
10	FW	José Riasco	2 February 2004 (aged 19)	(Uruguayan Football Association) Boston River
11	FW	Jovanny Bolívar	16 December 2001 (aged 22)	(Royal Spanish Football Federation) Huesca
12	GK	Frankarlos Benítez	3 May 2004 (aged 19)	(Venezuelan Football Federation) Caracas
13	DF	Jesús Paz	13 May 2001 (aged 22)	(Polish Football Association) Chrobry Głogów
14	MF	Carlos Faya	18 January 2002 (aged 22)	(Royal Spanish Football Federation) Navalcarnero
15	DF	Bianneider Tamayo	13 January 2005 (aged 19)	(Venezuelan Football Federation) Caracas
16	DF	Renné Rivas	21 March 2003 (aged 20)	(Venezuelan Football Federation) Caracas
17	MF	**David Martínez**	7 February 2006 (aged 17)	(United States Soccer Federation) LAFC
18	DF	Jesús Quintero	1 February 2001 (aged 22)	(Colombian Football Federation) Deportivo Pasto
19	FW	Bryan Castillo	14 May 2001 (aged 22)	(Venezuelan Football Federation) Deportivo Táchira
20	MF	Anderson Contreras	30 March 2001 (aged 22)	(Venezuelan Football Federation) Caracas
21	DF	Álex Custodio	31 January 2004 (aged 19)	(Venezuelan Football Federation) Deportivo La Guaira
22	GK	Pedro Fulco	26 January 2005 (aged 18)	(Venezuelan Football Federation) Academia Puerto Cabello
23	FW	Luifer Hernández	28 April 2001 (aged 22)	(Venezuelan Football Federation) Academia Puerto Cabello

=== Brazil ===
Brazil announced their 23-man squad on 21 December 2023, Defender Luan Cândido (Red Bull Bragantino), midfielder Danilo (Nottingham Forest) and goalkeeper Andrew (Gil Vicente) were ruled out as their clubs decided not to release them and were replaced by Kaiki Bruno, Maurício and Kaique, respectively. On 5 January 2024, the Brazilian Football Confederation announced a final 23-man squad with several more changes: defenders Vinicius Tobias (Real Madrid), Patryck Lanza (São Paulo), Kaiky (Almería) and Robert Renan (Internacional) were replaced by Khellven, Rikelme, Luan Patrick and Bruno Gomes. On 11 January 2024, defender Matheus Dias was ruled out due to an injury and four days later was replaced by Lucas Fasson.

Head coach: Ramon Menezes

No.	Pos.	Player	Date of birth (age)	Club
1	GK	Mycael	12 March 2004 (aged 19)	(Brazilian Football Confederation) Athletico Paranaense
2	DF	Khellven	25 February 2001 (aged 22)	(Russian Football Union) CSKA Moscow
3	DF	Michel	20 May 2003 (aged 20)	(Brazilian Football Confederation) Palmeiras
4	DF	Arthur Chaves	29 January 2001 (aged 22)	(Portuguese Football Federation) Académico de Viseu
5	MF	**Andrey Santos**	3 May 2004 (aged 19)	(The Football Association) Chelsea
6	DF	Kaiki Bruno	8 March 2003 (aged 20)	(Brazilian Football Confederation) Cruzeiro
7	MF	Gabriel Pirani	4 December 2002 (aged 21)	(United States Soccer Federation) D.C. United
8	MF	Marlon Gomes	14 December 2003 (aged 20)	(Brazilian Football Confederation) Vasco da Gama
9	FW	**Endrick**	21 July 2006 (aged 17)	(Brazilian Football Confederation) Palmeiras
10	FW	Marquinhos	7 April 2003 (aged 20)	(The Football Association) Arsenal
11	FW	Guilherme Biro	20 April 2004 (aged 19)	(Brazilian Football Confederation) Corinthians
12	GK	Matheus Donelli	17 May 2002 (aged 21)	(Brazilian Football Confederation) Corinthians
13	DF	Luan Patrick	20 January 2002 (aged 22)	(Brazilian Football Confederation) Athletico Paranaense
14	DF	Lucas Fasson	30 May 2001 (aged 22)	(Russian Football Union) Lokomotiv Moscow
15	MF	Bruno Gomes	4 April 2001 (aged 22)	(Brazilian Football Confederation) Coritiba
16	DF	Rikelme	16 July 2003 (aged 20)	(Brazilian Football Confederation) Cuiabá
17	DF	Ronald	11 February 2003 (aged 20)	(Brazilian Football Confederation) Grêmio
18	MF	Alexsander	8 October 2003 (aged 20)	(Brazilian Football Confederation) Fluminense
19	FW	John Kennedy	18 May 2002 (aged 21)	(Brazilian Football Confederation) Fluminense
20	MF	Maurício	22 June 2001 (aged 22)	(Brazilian Football Confederation) Internacional
21	FW	Giovane	24 November 2003 (aged 20)	(Brazilian Football Confederation) Corinthians
22	GK	Kaique	16 April 2003 (aged 20)	(Brazilian Football Confederation) Palmeiras
23	FW	Gabriel Pec	11 February 2001 (aged 22)	(United States Soccer Federation) LA Galaxy

=== Colombia ===
Colombia announced their 23-man squad on 5 January 2024. On 11 January, forwards Kener Valencia and Edwin Mosquera were ruled out due to injuries and were replaced by Nelson Quiñones and Alejandro García, respectively. During the tournament, forwards Óscar Cortés and Andrés Gómez were released from the squad, the former at the request of his club Lens after Colombia missed out on qualification, and the latter due to injury.

Head coach: Héctor Cárdenas

No.	Pos.	Player	Date of birth (age)	Club
1	GK	Sebastián Guerra	8 January 2001 (aged 23)	(United States Soccer Federation) Atlanta United FC
2	DF	Cristian Devenish (captain)	25 January 2001 (aged 22)	(Colombian Football Federation) Atlético Nacional
3	DF	Brayan Ceballos	24 May 2001 (aged 22)	(Colombian Football Federation) Atlético Junior
4	DF	Fernando Álvarez	24 August 2003 (aged 20)	(Canadian Soccer Association) CF Montréal
5	MF	Jimer Fory	24 May 2002 (aged 21)	(Colombian Football Federation) Deportivo Pereira
6	DF	**Juan David Mosquera** (captain)	5 September 2002 (aged 21)	(United States Soccer Federation) Portland Timbers
7	FW	Alejandro García	28 February 2001 (aged 22)	(Colombian Football Federation) Once Caldas
8	FW	Brahian Palacios	24 November 2002 (aged 21)	(Colombian Football Federation) Atlético Nacional
9	FW	Carlos Cortés	17 September 2001 (aged 22)	(Colombian Football Federation) Cortuluá
10	MF	**Daniel Ruiz**	30 July 2001 (aged 22)	(Colombian Football Federation) Millonarios
11	FW	**Andrés Gómez**	12 September 2002 (aged 21)	(United States Soccer Federation) Real Salt Lake
12	GK	Alejandro Rodríguez	12 January 2001 (aged 23)	(Colombian Football Federation) Deportivo Cali
13	MF	Juan Castilla	27 July 2004 (aged 19)	(Colombian Football Federation) Deportivo Cali
14	MF	Yani Quintero	17 July 2002 (aged 21)	(Colombian Football Federation) Deportes Quindío
15	MF	**Nelson Palacio**	16 June 2001 (aged 22)	(United States Soccer Federation) Real Salt Lake
16	FW	Nelson Quiñones	20 August 2002 (aged 21)	(United States Soccer Federation) Houston Dynamo FC
17	FW	Óscar Perea	27 September 2005 (aged 18)	(Colombian Football Federation) Atlético Nacional
18	MF	Jhojan Torres	12 January 2003 (aged 21)	(Colombian Football Federation) Santa Fe
19	DF	Devan Tanton	3 January 2004 (aged 20)	(The Football Association) Fulham
20	FW	**Óscar Cortés**	3 December 2003 (aged 20)	(French Football Federation) Lens
21	DF	**Samuel Velásquez**	29 May 2003 (aged 20)	(Colombian Football Federation) Atlético Nacional
22	GK	Luis Marquinez	10 April 2003 (aged 20)	(Colombian Football Federation) Atlético Nacional
23	MF	Josen Escobar	12 December 2004 (aged 19)	(Colombian Football Federation) América de Cali

=== Bolivia ===
Bolivia announced a preliminary roster of 35 players on 1 January 2024. The final 23-man squad was announced on 16 January 2024.

Midfielder Miguel Terceros (Santos) and forwards Enzo Monteiro (Santos) and Jaume Cuellar (Barcelona Atlètic) were initially considered but then ruled out because their clubs decided not to release them.

Head coach: (Brazil) Antônio Carlos Zago

No.	Pos.	Player	Date of birth (age)	Club
1	GK	Bruno Poveda	22 October 2003 (aged 20)	(Bolivian Football Federation) Jorge Wilstermann
2	DF	**Jairo Quinteros**	7 February 2001 (aged 22)	(Bolivian Football Federation) Bolívar
3	DF	**Diego Medina**	13 January 2002 (aged 22)	(Bolivian Football Federation) Always Ready
4	DF	Denilson Durán	24 March 2003 (aged 20)	(Bolivian Football Federation) Blooming
5	DF	César Romero	3 August 2001 (aged 22)	(Bolivian Football Federation) Blooming
6	DF	Eduardo Álvarez	9 April 2003 (aged 20)	(Bolivian Football Federation) Royal Pari
7	MF	Miguel Villarroel	10 January 2003 (aged 21)	(Bolivian Football Federation) Bolívar
8	MF	Carlos Sejas	10 January 2004 (aged 20)	(Bolivian Football Federation) Aurora
9	FW	José Briceño	20 January 2002 (aged 22)	Unattached
10	FW	**Lucas Chávez**	17 April 2003 (aged 20)	(Bolivian Football Federation) Bolívar
11	MF	Javier Uzeda	31 July 2002 (aged 21)	(Bolivian Football Federation) Bolívar
12	GK	Carlos Adorno	3 April 2001 (aged 22)	(Bolivian Football Federation) Nacional Potosí
13	DF	**Pablo Vaca**	31 May 2002 (aged 21)	(Bolivian Football Federation) Always Ready
14	DF	Yomar Rocha	21 June 2003 (aged 20)	(Bolivian Football Federation) Bolívar
15	MF	**Gabriel Villamil**	28 June 2001 (aged 22)	(Ecuadorian Football Federation) LDU Quito
16	MF	Marco Salazar	14 October 2004 (aged 19)	(Bolivian Football Federation) Always Ready
17	MF	Jhon Velásquez	22 April 2003 (aged 20)	(Bolivian Football Federation) Bolívar
18	MF	**Fernando Nava**	8 June 2004 (aged 19)	(Brazilian Football Confederation) Athletico Paranaense
19	FW	**Jeyson Chura**	3 February 2002 (aged 21)	(Bolivian Football Federation) The Strongest
20	DF	Leonardo Justiniano	20 July 2001 (aged 22)	(Bolivian Football Federation) Real Tomayapo
21	FW	Daniel Ribera	18 February 2005 (aged 18)	(Argentine Football Association) Talleres (C)
22	DF	Daniel Lino	18 February 2002 (aged 21)	(Bolivian Football Federation) The Strongest
23	GK	Daniel Sandy	22 October 2001 (aged 22)	(Bolivian Football Federation) Jorge Wilstermann

=== Ecuador ===
Ecuador announced their 23-man squad on 28 December 2023. On 3 January 2024, Ecuadorian Football Federation announced that Sebastián González, Óscar Zambrano, Daykol Romero (all three from LDU Quito) and Jhoanner Chávez (Bahia) were dropped from the squad because their clubs decided not to release them and were replaced by Ronny Borja, Andrew Draper, Ronald Perlaza and Carlos Sánchez.

Forward Nilson Angulo was initially considered but was not part of the team as his club (Anderlecht) decided not to release him.

Head coach: Miguel Bravo

No.	Pos.	Player	Date of birth (age)	Club
1	GK	Cristhian Loor	9 March 2006 (aged 17)	(Ecuadorian Football Federation) Independiente del Valle
2	DF	Óscar Quiñónez	19 February 2001 (aged 22)	(Ecuadorian Football Federation) Orense
3	DF	Christian García	6 July 2004 (aged 19)	(Ecuadorian Football Federation) Independiente del Valle
4	DF	Álex Rangel	18 March 2002 (aged 21)	(Ecuadorian Football Federation) Técnico Universitario
5	MF	Erick Plúas	20 March 2002 (aged 21)	(Ecuadorian Football Federation) Orense
6	DF	**Layan Loor**	23 May 2001 (aged 22)	(Ecuadorian Football Federation) Universidad Católica
7	FW	**Yaimar Medina**	5 November 2004 (aged 19)	(Ecuadorian Football Federation) Independiente del Valle
8	MF	**Patrik Mercado**	31 July 2003 (aged 20)	(Ecuadorian Football Federation) Independiente del Valle
9	FW	Justin Cuero	18 March 2004 (aged 19)	(Russian Football Union) Orenburg
10	MF	**Pedro Vite** (captain)	9 March 2002 (aged 21)	(Canadian Soccer Association) Vancouver Whitecaps
11	FW	**John Mercado**	3 June 2002 (aged 21)	(Portuguese Football Federation) AVS
12	GK	Gilmar Napa	5 January 2003 (aged 21)	(Ecuadorian Football Federation) Emelec
13	DF	Joshué Quiñónez	29 May 2001 (aged 22)	(Ecuadorian Football Federation) Barcelona
14	DF	Carlos Sánchez	6 February 2001 (aged 22)	(Ecuadorian Football Federation) Independiente del Valle
15	MF	Ronny Borja	10 June 2005 (aged 18)	(Ecuadorian Football Federation) El Nacional
16	FW	**Allen Obando**	13 June 2006 (aged 17)	(Ecuadorian Football Federation) Barcelona
17	FW	Júnior Ayoví	21 December 2001 (aged 22)	(Ecuadorian Football Federation) Guayaquil City
18	MF	Youri Ochoa	10 January 2005 (aged 19)	(Ecuadorian Football Federation) Independiente del Valle
19	FW	Cristhoper Zambrano	5 July 2004 (aged 19)	(Ecuadorian Football Federation) Aucas
20	MF	Andrew Draper	4 August 2001 (aged 22)	(United States Soccer Federation) Sporting Kansas City
21	MF	Ronald Perlaza	11 May 2005 (aged 18)	(Ecuadorian Football Federation) Aucas
22	GK	Alexis Villa	22 September 2001 (aged 22)	(Ecuadorian Football Federation) Independiente del Valle
23	DF	Maikel Reyes	13 January 2003 (aged 21)	(Ecuadorian Football Federation) Delfín

== Group B ==
=== Argentina ===
Argentina announced their 23-man squad on 10 January 2024. Julián Malatini was ruled out of the squad after he was transferred to Werder Bremen, who revoked the authorization initially given by the player's selling club Defensa y Justicia, so Argentina will only have 22 players for this competition.

Head coach: Javier Mascherano

No.	Pos.	Player	Date of birth (age)	Club
1	GK	Leandro Brey	21 September 2002 (aged 21)	(Argentine Football Association) Boca Juniors
2	DF	Marco Di Cesare	30 January 2002 (aged 21)	(Argentine Football Association) Argentinos Juniors
3	DF	Valentín Barco	23 July 2004 (aged 19)	(The Football Association) Brighton & Hove Albion
4	DF	Joaquín García	20 August 2001 (aged 22)	(Argentine Football Association) Vélez Sarsfield
5	MF	Federico Redondo	18 January 2003 (aged 21)	(Argentine Football Association) Argentinos Juniors
6	DF	Nicolás Valentini	6 April 2001 (aged 22)	(Argentine Football Association) Boca Juniors
7	FW	Pablo Solari	22 March 2001 (aged 22)	(Argentine Football Association) River Plate
8	MF	Cristian Medina	1 June 2002 (aged 21)	(Argentine Football Association) Boca Juniors
9	FW	Luciano Gondou	22 June 2001 (aged 22)	(Argentine Football Association) Argentinos Juniors
10	MF	**Thiago Almada** (captain)	26 April 2001 (aged 22)	(United States Soccer Federation) Atlanta United
11	MF	Claudio Echeverri	2 January 2006 (aged 18)	(Argentine Football Association) River Plate
12	GK	Fabricio Iacovich	29 January 2002 (aged 21)	(Argentine Football Association) Estudiantes (LP)
13	MF	Juan Sforza	14 February 2002 (aged 21)	(Argentine Football Association) Newell's Old Boys
14	DF	Aaron Quirós	31 October 2001 (aged 22)	(Argentine Football Association) Banfield
15	DF	Gonzalo Luján	27 April 2001 (aged 22)	(Argentine Football Association) San Lorenzo
16	MF	Baltasar Rodríguez	9 July 2003 (aged 20)	(Argentine Football Association) Racing
17	FW	Francisco González	6 April 2001 (aged 22)	(Argentine Football Association) Newell's Old Boys
18	FW	Santiago Castro	18 September 2004 (aged 19)	(Argentine Football Association) Vélez Sarsfield
19	DF	Julián Malatini	31 May 2001 (aged 22)	(German Football Association) Werder Bremen
20	MF	Juan Nardoni	14 July 2002 (aged 21)	(Argentine Football Association) Racing
21	MF	Ezequiel Fernández	25 July 2002 (aged 21)	(Argentine Football Association) Boca Juniors
22	DF	Lucas Esquivel	14 October 2001 (aged 22)	(Brazilian Football Confederation) Athletico Paranaense
23	GK	Rocco Ríos Novo	4 June 2002 (aged 21)	(United States Soccer Federation) Phoenix Rising

=== Uruguay ===
Uruguay announced their 23-man squad on 5 January 2024. On 17 January, the Uruguayan Football Association announced that Los Angeles FC decided to revoke the authorization of its striker Cristian Olivera to participate in the tournament, so the Uruguayan team will only have 22 players, as substitutions are only allowed in case of serious injury or illness. On the same day, forward Rodrigo Dudok was replaced by Agustín Albarracín due to an injury.

Defender Alan Matturro (Genoa) and forwards Matías Arezo (Granada) and Agustín Álvarez Martínez (Sassuolo) were initially considered but then ruled out because their clubs decided not to release them.

Head coach: (Argentina) Marcelo Bielsa

No.	Pos.	Player	Date of birth (age)	Club
1	GK	Ignacio Suárez	5 February 2002 (aged 21)	(Uruguayan Football Association) Nacional
2	DF	Sebastián Boselli	4 December 2003 (aged 20)	(Argentine Football Association) River Plate
3	DF	Mateo Antoni	22 April 2003 (aged 20)	(Uruguayan Football Association) Nacional
4	DF	Mateo Ponte	24 May 2003 (aged 20)	(Brazilian Football Confederation) Botafogo
5	MF	César Araújo	2 April 2001 (aged 22)	(United States Soccer Federation) Orlando City
6	DF	Valentín Rodríguez	13 June 2001 (aged 22)	(Uruguayan Football Association) Peñarol
7	FW	Anderson Duarte	23 March 2004 (aged 19)	(Uruguayan Football Association) Defensor Sporting
8	MF	Rodrigo Chagas	20 August 2003 (aged 20)	(Uruguayan Football Association) Nacional
9	FW	Matias Fonseca	12 March 2001 (aged 22)	(Uruguayan Football Association) Montevideo Wanderers
10	MF	Tiago Palacios	28 March 2001 (aged 22)	(Uruguayan Football Association) Montevideo City Torque
11	FW	Juan Cruz de los Santos	22 February 2003 (aged 20)	(Uruguayan Football Association) River Plate
12	GK	Randall Rodríguez	29 November 2003 (aged 20)	(Uruguayan Football Association) Peñarol
13	FW	Agustín Albarracín	29 August 2005 (aged 18)	(Uruguayan Football Association) Montevideo Wanderers
14	DF	Nicolás Marichal	17 March 2001 (aged 22)	(Russian Football Union) Dynamo Moscow
15	MF	Vicente Poggi	11 July 2002 (aged 21)	(Argentine Football Association) Godoy Cruz
16	MF	Erico Cuello	25 May 2005 (aged 18)	(Uruguayan Football Association) Defensor Sporting
17	FW	Matías Abaldo	2 April 2004 (aged 19)	(Argentine Football Association) Gimnasia y Esgrima (LP)
18	MF	Santiago Homenchenko	30 August 2003 (aged 20)	(Uruguayan Football Association) Peñarol
19	FW	Luciano Rodríguez	16 July 2003 (aged 20)	(Uruguayan Football Association) Liverpool
20	FW	Cristian Olivera	17 April 2002 (aged 21)	(United States Soccer Federation) Los Angeles FC
21	MF	Renzo Sánchez	17 February 2004 (aged 19)	(Uruguayan Football Association) Nacional
22	DF	Fredy Martínez	1 May 2001 (aged 22)	(Uruguayan Football Association) Nacional
23	GK	Fabrizio Correa	18 January 2001 (aged 23)	(Uruguayan Football Association) River Plate

=== Chile ===
Chile announced a preliminary roster of 35 players on 11 December 2023. The preliminary roster was reduced to 28 after seven players were ruled out, including midfielder Luis Rojas who was excluded due to disciplinary issues. The final 23-man squad was announced on 5 January 2024. On 10 January 2024, midfielder Felipe Chamorro was ruled out due to an injury, and was replaced by Leandro Hernández. On 16 January 2024, forward Lautaro Pastrán was ruled out due to an injury, and was replaced by Clemente Montes.

Players such as Darío Osorio (Midtjylland), Nayel Mehssatou (Kortrijk) and Bruno Barticciotto (Talleres) did not make the squad as their clubs decided not to release them.

Head coach: Nicolás Córdova

No.	Pos.	Player	Date of birth (age)	Club
1	GK	Vicente Reyes	19 November 2003 (aged 20)	(The Football Association) Norwich City
2	DF	Joaquín Gutiérrez	4 July 2002 (aged 21)	(Football Federation of Chile) Huachipato
3	DF	Jonathan Villagra	28 March 2001 (aged 22)	(Football Federation of Chile) Unión Española
4	DF	Matías Vásquez	12 January 2003 (aged 21)	(Football Federation of Chile) Magallanes
5	DF	Valentín Vidal	12 May 2004 (aged 19)	(Football Federation of Chile) Unión Española
6	MF	**Vicente Pizarro** (captain)	5 November 2002 (aged 21)	(Football Federation of Chile) Colo-Colo
7	FW	**Clemente Montes**	25 April 2001 (aged 22)	(Football Federation of Chile) Universidad Católica
8	MF	**César Pérez**	29 November 2002 (aged 21)	(Football Federation of Chile) Unión La Calera
9	FW	**Luciano Arriagada**	30 April 2002 (aged 21)	(Brazilian Football Confederation) Athletico Paranaense
10	MF	**Lucas Assadi**	8 January 2004 (aged 20)	(Football Federation of Chile) Universidad de Chile
11	FW	Gonzalo Tapia	18 February 2002 (aged 21)	(Football Federation of Chile) Universidad Católica
12	GK	Diego Carreño	26 April 2002 (aged 21)	(Football Federation of Chile) O'Higgins
13	DF	Daniel Gutiérrez	16 February 2003 (aged 20)	(Football Federation of Chile) Colo-Colo
14	FW	Leandro Hernández	13 June 2005 (aged 18)	(Football Federation of Chile) Colo-Colo
15	MF	Renato Cordero	16 April 2003 (aged 20)	(Football Federation of Chile) Universidad de Chile
16	MF	Jeison Fuentealba	10 January 2003 (aged 21)	(Football Federation of Chile) Universidad de Chile
17	DF	Esteban Matus	12 February 2002 (aged 21)	(Football Federation of Chile) Audax Italiano
18	FW	**Alexander Aravena**	6 September 2002 (aged 21)	(Football Federation of Chile) Universidad Católica
19	FW	Lucas Cepeda	31 October 2002 (aged 21)	(Football Federation of Chile) Santiago Wanderers
20	FW	**Damián Pizarro**	28 March 2005 (aged 18)	(Football Federation of Chile) Colo-Colo
21	FW	Julián Alfaro	2 September 2001 (aged 22)	(Football Federation of Chile) Magallanes
22	DF	**Jeyson Rojas**	23 January 2002 (aged 21)	(Football Federation of Chile) Colo-Colo
23	GK	Ignacio Sáez	4 September 2005 (aged 18)	(Football Federation of Chile) Universidad de Chile

=== Paraguay ===
Paraguay announced their 23-man squad on 5 January 2024.

Players such as Romeo Benítez (Athletico Paranaense), Damián Bobadilla (São Paulo), Matías Segovia (Botafogo), Julio Enciso (Brighton & Hove Albion), Diego González (Lazio), Hugo Cuenca (Milan), Sebastián Olmedo (Puebla), Matías Galarza (Talleres) and Santiago Ocampos (Flamengo) did not make the squad as their clubs decided not to release them.

Head coach: Carlos Jara Saguier

No.	Pos.	Player	Date of birth (age)	Club
1	GK	Ángel González	4 February 2003 (aged 20)	(Paraguayan Football Association) Libertad
2	DF	Alan Núñez	1 October 2004 (aged 19)	(Paraguayan Football Association) Cerro Porteño
3	DF	Gilberto Flores	1 April 2003 (aged 20)	(Paraguayan Football Association) Libertad
4	DF	Alexis Cantero	5 February 2003 (aged 20)	(Paraguayan Football Association) Guaraní
5	DF	Fernando Román	23 February 2001 (aged 22)	(Paraguayan Football Association) Guaraní
6	MF	Marcos Gómez	10 November 2001 (aged 22)	(Paraguayan Football Association) Olimpia
7	FW	Tiago Caballero	27 May 2005 (aged 18)	(Paraguayan Football Association) Nacional
8	MF	**Diego Gómez** (captain)	27 March 2003 (aged 20)	(United States Soccer Federation) Inter Miami
9	FW	Kevin Parzajuk	9 August 2002 (aged 21)	(Paraguayan Football Association) Olimpia
10	MF	Wílder Viera	4 March 2002 (aged 21)	(Paraguayan Football Association) Cerro Porteño
11	FW	Marcelo Fernández	25 October 2001 (aged 22)	(Paraguayan Football Association) Libertad
12	GK	Rodrigo Frutos	6 January 2003 (aged 21)	(Paraguayan Football Association) Olimpia
13	DF	Ronaldo Dejesús	21 April 2001 (aged 22)	(Paraguayan Football Association) Cerro Porteño
14	MF	Rubén Lezcano	9 February 2004 (aged 19)	(Paraguayan Football Association) Libertad
15	DF	Gastón Benítez	21 May 2002 (aged 21)	(Paraguayan Football Association) Nacional
16	MF	Juan José Cardozo	24 February 2004 (aged 19)	(Argentine Football Association) Argentinos Juniors
17	FW	Marcelo Pérez	23 March 2001 (aged 22)	(Argentine Football Association) Huracán
18	MF	Iván Leguizamón	3 July 2002 (aged 21)	(Argentine Football Association) San Lorenzo
19	MF	Fabrizio Peralta	2 August 2002 (aged 21)	(Paraguayan Football Association) Cerro Porteño
20	MF	Enso González	20 January 2005 (aged 19)	(The Football Association) Wolverhampton Wanderers
21	DF	Daniel Rivas	6 December 2001 (aged 22)	(Paraguayan Football Association) Cerro Porteño
22	GK	Javier Talavera	12 August 2003 (aged 20)	(Paraguayan Football Association) Cerro Porteño
23	MF	Fernando Cardozo	8 February 2001 (aged 22)	(Paraguayan Football Association) Olimpia

=== Peru ===
Peru announced their 23-man squad on 15 January 2024.

Players such as Piero Quispe (UNAM), Alfonso Barco (Defensor Sporting), Jesús Castillo (Gil Vicente), Catriel Cabellos (Alianza Lima), Joao Grimaldo, Jostin Alarcón (both from Sporting Cristal), Matías Lazo and Kenji Cabrera (both from Melgar) did not make the squad as their clubs decided not to release them.

Head coach: José del Solar

No.	Pos.	Player	Date of birth (age)	Club
1	GK	Diego Romero	17 August 2001 (aged 22)	(Peruvian Football Federation) Universitario
2	DF	Anderson Villacorta	25 July 2005 (aged 18)	(Mexican Football Federation) Zacatecas
3	DF	Alejandro Pósito	5 September 2005 (aged 18)	(Peruvian Football Federation) Sporting Cristal
4	DF	Erick Noriega	22 October 2001 (aged 22)	(Peruvian Football Federation) Comerciantes Unidos
5	DF	Rafael Lutiger	3 July 2001 (aged 22)	(Peruvian Football Federation) Sporting Cristal
6	MF	Ian Wisdom	14 September 2005 (aged 18)	(Peruvian Football Federation) Sporting Cristal
7	DF	Emilio Saba (captain)	26 March 2001 (aged 22)	(Peruvian Football Federation) Carlos A. Mannucci
8	MF	Álvaro Rojas	12 March 2005 (aged 18)	(Peruvian Football Federation) Universitario
9	FW	Víctor Guzmán	25 March 2006 (aged 17)	(Peruvian Football Federation) Alianza Lima
10	MF	Adrián Ascues	15 November 2002 (aged 21)	(Peruvian Football Federation) Sporting Cristal
11	FW	Diether Vásquez	6 July 2003 (aged 20)	(Mexican Football Federation) Zacatecas
12	GK	Jhefferson Rodríguez	13 March 2006 (aged 17)	(Peruvian Football Federation) Universitario
13	DF	Mathías Llontop	22 May 2002 (aged 21)	(Peruvian Football Federation) Carlos A. Mannucci
14	DF	Marco Huamán	25 September 2002 (aged 21)	(Peruvian Football Federation) Alianza Lima
15	DF	Julinho Astudillo	7 January 2005 (aged 19)	(Peruvian Football Federation) Universitario
16	MF	Eslyn Correa	29 June 2005 (aged 18)	(Peruvian Football Federation) Cusco
17	MF	Bassco Soyer	17 October 2006 (aged 17)	(Peruvian Football Federation) Alianza Lima
18	MF	Alessandro Burlamaqui	18 February 2002 (aged 21)	(Royal Spanish Football Federation) Intercity
19	FW	Guillermo Larios	11 May 2002 (aged 21)	(Peruvian Football Federation) Alianza Atlético
20	FW	Juan Pablo Goicochea	12 January 2005 (aged 19)	Unattached
21	GK	Jeferson Nolasco	19 March 2002 (aged 21)	(Peruvian Football Federation) Cienciano
22	DF	Brian Arias	2 September 2006 (aged 17)	(Peruvian Football Federation) Alianza Lima
23	MF	Franchesco Flores	15 June 2001 (aged 22)	(Peruvian Football Federation) Universidad César Vallejo
