= Football at the 2022 South American Games – Women's tournament =

Women's football at the 2022 South American Games
Tournament details
- Host country: Paraguay
- Dates: 5–11 October
- Teams: 6
- Venue: 1 (in 1 host city)

Final positions
- Champions: Venezuela
- Runners-up: Uruguay
- Third place: Colombia
- Fourth place: Paraguay

Tournament statistics
- Matches played: 8
- Goals scored: 28 (3.5 per match)
- Attendance: 5,250 (656 per match)
- Top scorer: (Uruguay) Belén Aquino (5 goals)

The women's tournament of the football at the 2022 South American Games was held from 5 to 11 October 2022 at the Complejo de Fútbol in Luque, Paraguay, a sub-venue outside Asunción. It was the third edition of the football women's tournament at the South American Games since its first appearance in Santiago 2014 (It had been scheduled to be held in Medellin 2010 but ended being cancelled).

The tournament was restricted to under-20 players (born on or after 1 January 2002).

Hosts and defending champions Paraguay were unable to retain their title after finishing second in their group, which led them to play the bronze medal match which they lost 1–0 to Colombia.

Venezuela won the gold medal and their first South American Games women's football title by beating Uruguay in the final on penalties after a 2–2 draw.

== Schedule ==
The tournament was held over a 7-day period, from 5 to 11 October.

GS	Group stage	SF	Semi-finals	B	Bronze medal match	F	Gold medal match

Wed 5	Thu 6	Fri 7	Sat 8	Sun 9	Mon 10	Tue 11	
GS		GS		GS		B	F
2 M		2 M		2 M		2 M	

== Teams ==
A total of eight ODESUR NOCs entered teams for the women's tournament.

Teams	App	Previous best performance
Argentina	3rd	Gold medal (2014)
Chile	3rd	Silver medal (2014)
Colombia	3rd	Silver medal (2018)
Paraguay	2nd	Gold medal (2018)
Uruguay	2nd	Group stage (2014)
Venezuela	2nd	Group stage (2014)

=== Rosters ===
Each participating NOC had to enter a roster of 18 players (Technical manual Article 9). Players had to be born on or after 1 January 2002 to be eligible (Technical manual Article 1).

== Venue ==
All matches were played at the Complejo de Fútbol courts located within the Parque Olímpico cluster in Luque, Paraguay, owned by the Paraguayan Olympic Committee.

== Results ==
All match times are in PYST (UTC−3).

=== Group stage ===
The group stage consisted of two groups of 3 teams, each group was played under the round-robin format. The winners of each group advanced to the gold medal match while the runners-up advanced to the bronze medal match.

Teams were ranked according to points earned (3 points for a win, 1 point for a draw, 0 points for a loss). If tied on points, the following tiebreakers were applied (Technical manual Article 10.1):

1. Goal difference;
2. Goals scored;
3. Fewest goals against;
4. Fewest red cards received;
5. Fewest yellow cards received;
6. Drawing of lots.

==== Group A ====
Pos	Team	Pld	W	D	L	GF	GA	GD	Pts	Qualification
1	Venezuela	2	2	0	0	8	0	+8	6	Advance to gold medal match
2	Paraguay (H)	2	1	0	1	3	6	−3	3	Advance to bronze medal match
3	Chile	2	0	0	2	1	6	−5	0	

Source: ASU2022
(H) Hosts
5 October 2022
9:00

Paraguay	0–5	Venezuela
	Report	Olivieri 42' (pen.); Jiménez 52'; Campos 53'; Martínez 83'; Hernández 88'

Complejo de Fútbol – court 1, Luque
Attendance: 750
Referee: Charly Deretti (Brazil)
7 October 2022
11:15

Venezuela	3–0	Chile
Campos 40', 44'; Jiménez 79'	Report

Complejo de Fútbol – court 1, Luque
Attendance: 300
Referee: Marcelly Zambrano (Ecuador)
9 October 2022
11:15

Paraguay	3–1	Chile
Leiva 38'; Villalba 65'; Cristaldo 90+5'	Report	Valencia 2'

Complejo de Fútbol – court 1, Luque
Attendance: 1300
Referee: Sirley Cornejo (Bolivia)

==== Group B ====
Pos	Team	Pld	W	D	L	GF	GA	GD	Pts	Qualification
1	Uruguay	2	2	0	0	7	1	+6	6	Advance to gold medal match
2	Colombia	2	1	0	1	2	3	−1	3	Advance to bronze medal match
3	Argentina	2	0	0	2	2	7	−5	0	

Source: ASU2022
5 October 2022
11:15

Argentina	1–5	Uruguay
Natta 50'	Report	Carballo 17'; Gómez 18'; Aquino 25', 60', 64'

Complejo de Fútbol – court 1, Luque
Attendance: 100
Referee: Angelina Rodas (Paraguay)
7 October 2022
9:00

Uruguay	2–0	Colombia
Fontán 48' (pen.); Aquino 90+5'	Report

Complejo de Fútbol – court 1, Luque
Attendance: 750
Referee: Melany Bermejo (Peru)
9 October 2022
9:00

Argentina	1–2	Colombia
Holzheier 24'	Report	López 74'; Calvo 86'

Complejo de Fútbol – court 1, Luque
Attendance: 650
Referee: Charly Deretti (Brazil)

=== Final stage ===
The final stage consisted of the bronze and gold medal matches. If one or both matches were tied after 90 minutes, the match was decided directly by a penalty shoot-out.

Bronze medal match
11 October
Paraguay	0
Colombia	1

Gold medal match
11 October
Uruguay	2 (4)
Venezuela (p)	2 (5)

==== Bronze medal match ====
11 October 2022
9:00

Paraguay	0–1	Colombia
	Report	Reyes 28'

Complejo de Fútbol – court 1, Luque
Attendance: 700
Referee: Marcelly Zambrano (Ecuador)

==== Gold medal match ====
11 October 2022
16:00

Uruguay	2–2	Venezuela
Lemos 23'; Aquino 73'	Report	Olivieri 32'; Campos 57'
Penalties
Aquino (penalty scored); Núñez (penalty missed); Piña (penalty scored); Lemos (penalty scored); Carballo (penalty scored); Latua (penalty missed)	4–5	(penalty scored) Olivieri; (penalty scored) Infante; (penalty scored) Torrealba; (penalty missed) B. Martínez; (penalty scored) Campos; (penalty scored) Solorzano

Complejo de Fútbol – court 1, Luque
Attendance: 700
Referee: Charly Deretti (Brazil)

== Goalscorers ==
There were 28 goals scored in 8 matches, for an average of 3.5 goals per match.

5 goals

- (Uruguay) Belén Aquino

4 goals

- (Venezuela) Kimberlyn Campos

2 goals

- (Venezuela) Bárbara Olivieri
- (Venezuela) Marianyela Jiménez

1 goal

- (Argentina) Agostina Holzheier
- (Argentina) Magali Natta
- (Chile) Mary Valencia
- (Colombia) Ledys Calvo
- (Colombia) Yunaira López
- (Colombia) María Camila Reyes
- (Paraguay) Maidi Cristaldo
- (Paraguay) Tais Leyva
- (Paraguay) Pamela Villalba
- (Uruguay) Wendy Carballo
- (Uruguay) Oriana Fontán
- (Uruguay) Ángela Gómez
- (Uruguay) Solange Lemos
- (Venezuela) Génesis Hernández
- (Venezuela) Daniela Martínez

Source: ASU2022

== Final ranking ==
Rank	Team
1st place, gold medalist(s)	Venezuela
2nd place, silver medalist(s)	Uruguay
3rd place, bronze medalist(s)	Colombia
4	Paraguay
5	Argentina
5	Chile

2022 Men's South American Games Football Champions

Venezuela
First title

Team roster: Hilary Azuaje, Fabiola Solórzano, Maria Duerto, Sabrina Araujo-Elorza, Jaimar Torrealba, Ana Paula Fraiz, Gabriela Angulo (c), Marianyela Jiménez, Kimberlyn Campos, Bárbara Olivieri, Raiderlin Carrasco, Ashley Pulgar, Génesis Hernández, Daniela Martínez, Nerimar Infante, Floriangel Apostol, Zulaycar Milano, Bárbara Martínez
Head coach: Vincenzo Conti

== Medalists ==
Gold	Silver	Bronze
Venezuela Hilary Azuaje; Fabiola Solórzano; Maria Duerto; Sabrina Araujo-Elorza; Jaimar Torrealba; Ana Paula Fraiz; Gabriela Angulo (c); Marianyela Jiménez; Kimberlyn Campos; Bárbara Olivieri; Raiderlin Carrasco; Ashley Pulgar; Génesis Hernández; Daniela Martínez; Nerimar Infante; Floriangel Apostol; Zulaycar Milano; Bárbara Martínez Head coach: Vincenzo Conti	Uruguay Vanina Sburlati; Adriana Salvagno; Maria Cufré; Oriana Fontán; Valentina Pereira; Florencia Méndez; Alison Latúa; Ángela Gómez; Wendy Carballo; Solange Lemos; Belén Aquino (c); Jennifer Sosa; Ahelin Piña; Nikol Laurnaga; Agustina Nuñez; Florencia Bartholomai; Julieta Morales; Guillermina Grant Head coach: Daniel Pérez	Colombia Valery Restrepo; Danna Lambraño; Angie Guarín; Yunaira López; Camila Russi; Laura Marcelo; Sara Garzon; María Reyes (c); Gabriela Urueña; Greicy Landázury; Yirleidis Quejada; Sofia Buitrago; Sandra Ibargüen; Ledys Calvo; Vennus Pineda; Maryluz Montillo; Kaily Siso; Maria Rojas Head coach: Alejandro Camacho

== See also ==
- Football at the 2022 South American Games – Men's tournament
