= Lautaro Ovando =

Argentine footballer

Personal information
- Full name: Lautaro Nahuel Ovando
- Date of birth: 10 February 2003 (age 23)
- Place of birth: San Martín, Buenos Aires, Argentina
- Height: 1.72 m (5 ft 8 in)
- Position: Forward

Team information
- Current team: San Martín Tucumán (on loan from Argentinos Juniors)

Youth career
- Argentinos Juniors

Senior career*
Years	Team	Apps	(Gls)
2021–	Argentinos Juniors	20	(0)
2023–2024	→ Talleres (loan)	5	(0)
2024	→ Estudiantes BA (loan)	18	(2)
2025	→ Deportes La Serena (loan)	13	(0)
2026–	→ San Martín Tucumán (loan)	4	(3)

International career
- Argentina U15
2019	Argentina U16	6	(0)
2022	Argentina U20	4	(1)
- * Club domestic league appearances and goals as of 17:41, 4 May 2026 (UTC)

Lautaro Nahuel Ovando (born 10 February 2003) is an Argentine footballer who plays as a forward for San Martín Tucumán, on loan from Argentinos Juniors.

== Club career ==
Born in San Martín, Argentina, Ovando is a product of Argentinos Juniors and made his professional debut in an Argentine Primera División match against Independiente on 18 July 2021.

In August 2023, Ovando was loaned out to Talleres on a deal for 18 months with an option to buy. In June 2024, Argentinos Juniors ended his loan with Talleres and subsequently loaned him to Estudiantes de Buenos Aires until December of the same year.

In January 2025, Ovando moved on loan to Chilean Primera División club Deportes La Serena. He left them on 28 July of the same year.

== International career ==
Ovando has represented Argentina at under-15, under-16 and under-20 level. He represented Argentina U20 at the 2022 South American Games.
