= Exequiel Mereles =

Uruguayan footballer (born 2005)

Personal information
- Full name: Exequiel Mereles de la Quintana
- Date of birth: 16 September 2005 (age 21)
- Place of birth: San Carlos, Uruguay
- Height: 1.70 m (5 ft 7 in)
- Position: Forward

Team information
- Current team: Nacional
- Number: 24

Senior career*
Years	Team	Apps	(Gls)
2021–2023	Atenas	33	(3)
2024–	Nacional	15	(2)

International career
2022–2024	Uruguay U20	11	(1)
- * Club domestic league appearances and goals as of 1 October 2025

Exequiel Mereles de la Quintana (born 16 September 2005) is a Uruguayan professional footballer who plays as a forward for Nacional.

== Club career ==
Mereles is a youth academy graduate of Atenas. On 16 June 2021, Mereles made his professional debut for the club when Atenas manager Diego Forlán brought him on as a 81st-minute substitute for Gervasio Olivera in a 2–1 league defeat to Danubio.

Mereles joined Nacional in March 2024.

== International career ==
Mereles is a Uruguay youth international. In October 2022, he was named in Uruguay's squad for the 2022 South American Games.

== Career statistics ==
As of 27 August 2021

Club	Season	League			Cup		Continental		Total	
Club	Season	Division	Apps	Goals	Apps	Goals	Apps	Goals	Apps	Goals
Atenas	2021	Uruguayan Segunda División	3	0	0	0	—		3	0
Career total			3	0	0	0	0	0	3	0
