= César Romero (footballer, born 2001) =

Bolivian footballer

Personal information
- Full name: César Benjamín Romero Ortíz
- Date of birth: 3 August 2001 (age 25)
- Place of birth: Santa Cruz de la Sierra, Bolivia
- Height: 1.87 m (6 ft 1 1/2 in)
- Position: Defender

Team information
- Current team: SA Bulo Bulo
- Number: 26

Senior career*
Years	Team	Apps	(Gls)
2023-2025	Blooming	70	(3)
2026-	SA Bulo Bulo	1	(0)

International career^{‡}
2024-	Bolivia U23	2	(0)
2024-	Bolivia	1	(0)
- * Club domestic league appearances and goals as of 00:15 (UTC) 27 May 2026 ‡ National team caps and goals as of 00:15 (UTC) 15 June 2024

César Benjamín Romero Ortíz (born 3 August 2001) is a Bolivian professional footballer who plays for SA Bulo Bulo and the Bolivia national football team.

== Club career ==
A central defender, he made his league debut for Club Blooming in March 2023 against Bolivar. He scored his first league goal that month, in a 2–2 draw against Real Tomayapo. He was part of the Club Blooming team which played in the 2023 Copa Sudamericana.

== International career ==
A Bolivia U23 player, he was called up to the senior Bolivia national football team for the first time ahead of the 2024 Copa America. He made his debut for the senior Bolivia side on 31 May 2024, in a friendly match against Mexico in Chicago, Illinois. On 3 June 2024, he was subsequently named in the Bolivia squad for the 2024 Copa America.
