= Allan Wlk =

Paraguayan footballer (born 2003)

Personal information
- Full name: Allan Steven Wlk Duré
- Date of birth: 1 March 2003 (age 23)
- Place of birth: Asunción, Paraguay
- Height: 1.88 m (6 ft 2 in)
- Position: Forward

Team information
- Current team: Lanús
- Number: 20

Youth career
- Nacional
- Olimpia

Senior career*
Years	Team	Apps	(Gls)
2023–2026	Olimpia	4	(0)
2024	→ Celaya (loan)	32	(8)
2025	→ Ameliano (loan)	14	(1)
2025	→ Atlante (loan)	11	(1)
2026	→ Recoleta (loan)	18	(13)
2026–	Lanús	1	(0)

International career^{‡}
2022–	Paraguay U20	8	(8)
2026–	Paraguay	1	(0)
Medal record
Men's football
Representing Paraguay
South American Games
Gold medal – first place	2022 Asunción	Team
- * Club domestic league appearances and goals as of 16:32, 26 July 2026 (UTC) ‡ National team caps and goals as of 14:52, 18 November 2026 (UTC)

Allan Steven Wlk Duré (born 1 March 2003) is a Paraguayan footballer who plays as a striker for Argentine Primera División club Lanús and the Paraguay national team.

== Club career ==
=== Olimpia ===
Wlk played at Club Nacional as a child but started playing for Club Olimpia from the age of 14 years old. He broke numerous goal scoring records as a teenager including one period where he scored 130 goals in 3 seasons of youth football. He signed a professional contract with Olimpia in 2021 lasting until 2025. He made his league debut for Olimpia on 12 March 2023 in a 2-1 win against Club General Caballero JLM.

=== Celaya (loan) ===
In January 2024, he signed on a season-long loan for Mexican side Celaya of the Liga de Expansión MX. He scored his first league goal for the club in the 91st minute against Cimarrones de Sonora to secure a 1-0 away win for his side.

== International career ==
=== South American Games: Gold medal and top scorer ===
Wlk was the tournament top scorer as Paraguay won gold at the 2022 South American Games held in Paraguay between 4 and 12 October, 2022. His haul at the games of six goals in five games included a hat-trick against Peru. He also scored the only goal in the final as Paraguay beat Ecuador 1-0. Wlk was quoted as saying after the final; “This achievement is something unique that I will never forget, at the time I could not measure what we had achieved. I am very proud of this great group because we gave everything and we were fair winners of this gold medal”.

=== South American U20 Championships ===
Wlk was named in the Paraguay squad for the 2023 South American U-20 Championship held in Colombia which commenced in January 2023. He scored in Paraguay’s first two games, first against Colombia in a 1-1 draw, and second in a 2-1 win over Argentina.

== Personal life ==
His father is called Cristhian Wlk. Regarding his surname, Wlk was quoted as saying to the radio station Universo 970AM "My great-grandfather came from the Czech Republic after the war, he arrived and settled in Colonia Independencia, I often visit the place."
