= Davis Bautista =

Ecuadorian footballer (born 2005)

Personal information
- Full name: Davis Carlos Bautista Medina
- Date of birth: 16 February 2005 (age 21)
- Place of birth: Guayaquil, Ecuador
- Height: 1.83 m (6 ft 0 in)
- Position: Defender

Team information
- Current team: Houston Dynamo 2

Senior career*
Years	Team	Apps	(Gls)
2022	Aucas	0	(0)
2023–2026	Eintracht Frankfurt II	23	(0)
2023–2026	Eintracht Frankfurt	0	(0)
2026–	Houston Dynamo 2	0	(0)
Medal record
Men's football
Representing Ecuador
South American Games
Silver medal – second place	2022 Asunción	Team
- * Club domestic league appearances and goals as of 1 January 2025

Davis Carlos Bautista Medina (born 16 February 2005) is an Ecuadorian footballer who plays as a defender for Houston Dynamo 2.

== Early life ==
Bautista studied academics at the youth academy of Ecuadorian side Aucas.

== Career ==
Bautista represented Ecuador internationally at the 2023 South American U-20 Championship.

== Style of play ==
Bautista mainly operates as a defender and is left-footed.

== Personal life ==
Bautista was born in Quito, Ecuador.

== Career statistics ==
As of match played 30 November 2024

Appearances and goals by club, season and competition
Club	Season	League			National Cup		Total	
Club	Season	Division	Apps	Goals	Apps	Goals	Apps	Goals
SD Aucas	2022	Ecuadorian Serie A	0	0	–		0	0
Eintracht Frankfurt II	2023–24	Regionalliga Südwest	16	0	–		16	0
Eintracht Frankfurt II	2024–25	Regionalliga Südwest	7	0	–		7	0
Eintracht Frankfurt II	Total		23	0	–		23	0
Career total			23	0	–		23	0
