= Jeison Fuentealba =

Chilean footballer (born 2003)

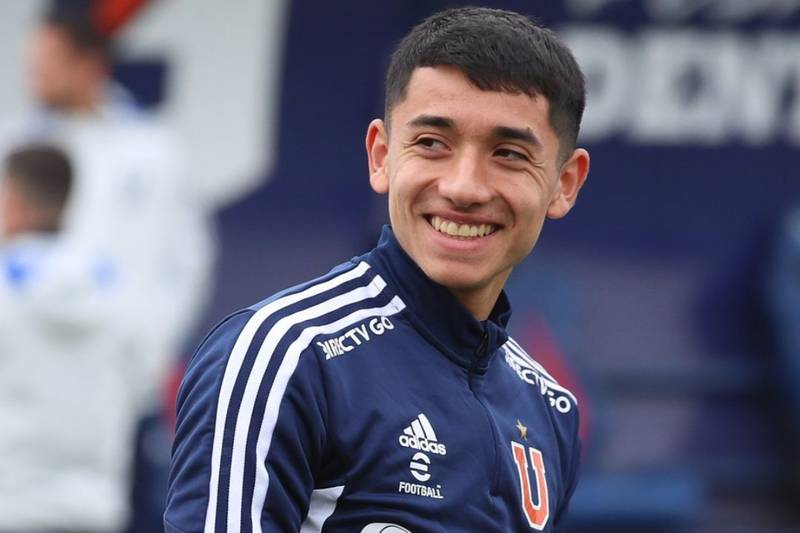
- Fuentealba with Universidad de Chile in 2023

Personal information
- Full name: Jeison Joaquín Fuentealba Vergara
- Date of birth: 10 January 2003 (age 23)
- Place of birth: Santiago, Chile
- Height: 1.69 m (5 ft 7 in)
- Position: Midfielder

Team information
- Current team: Universidad de Concepción (on loan from Universidad de Chile)

Youth career
- Universidad de Chile

Senior career*
Years	Team	Apps	(Gls)
2022–	Universidad de Chile	21	(1)
2022	→ Deportes La Serena (loan)	7	(0)
2024–	→ Universidad de Concepción (loan)	43	(7)

International career^{‡}
2021–2023	Chile U20	12	(3)
2024	Chile U23	2	(0)
- * Club domestic league appearances and goals as of 12 January 2026 ‡ National team caps and goals as of 13 February 2024

Jeison Joaquín Fuentealba Vergara (born 10 January 2003) is a Chilean footballer who plays as a midfielder for Universidad de Concepción on loan from Universidad de Chile.

== Club career ==
Born in Santiago de Chile, Fuentealba is a product of the Universidad de Chile youth system. In 2022, he was loaned to Deportes La Serena in the top division, with whom he made his professional debut, with no option to buy.

In 2023, he returned to Universidad de Chile, joining the first team. He scored his first goal in the 2–5 loss against O'Higgins on 7 August.

In the second half of 2024, Fuentealba was loaned out to Universidad de Concepción until the end of the season. He continued with them the next year and won the 2025 Primera B de Chile. He renewed for a third stint with them on 12 January 2026.

== International career ==
Fuentealba has made many appearances for the Chile U20 team. In December 2021, he made thee appearances in the Copa Rául Coloma Rivas. The next year, he made three appearances and scored two goals against Australia in the Costa Cálida Supercup in September, and took part in the South American Games, scoring against Ecuador.

In 2023, he took part in the South American U20 Championship, making three appearances. He also has been with the Chile under-23 squad in training microcycles.

In 2024, he took part in the Pre-Olympic Tournament.

At senior level, he received his first call up for the 2026 FIFA World Cup qualifiers against Uruguay and Colombia in September 2023.

== Honours ==
Universidad de Concepción

- Primera B de Chile: 2025
