= José Klinger =

Ecuadorean footballer (born 2005)

Personal information
- Full name: José Andrés Klinger Sosa
- Date of birth: 10 March 2005 (age 21)
- Place of birth: Esmeraldas, Ecuador
- Height: 1.67 m (5 ft 6 in)
- Position: Forward

Team information
- Current team: Macará (on loan from Independiente del Valle)

Senior career*
Years	Team	Apps	(Gls)
2023-	Independiente del Valle	2	(0)
2026-	→ Macará (loan)	8	(0)

International career
2023-	Ecuador U-20	11	(2)
Medal record
Men's football
Representing Ecuador
South American Games
Silver medal – second place	2022 Asunción	Team
- * Club domestic league appearances and goals as of 00:15, 28 December 2025 (UTC)

José Andrés Klinger Sosa (born 10 March 2005) is an Ecuadorean footballer who plays for Macará, on loan from Independiente del Valle. He is a Ecuador national under-20 football team.

== Club career ==
From Esmeraldas, he plays predominantly as a left-sided wide player. Klinger made his Ecuadorian Serie A debut for Independiente del Valle on 12 June 2023 appearing as a substitute against Orense. He made his debut in the Copa Libertadores on 29 June 2023, against Argentinos Juniors.

== International career ==
He was selected by Ecuador to represent them at the 2023 South American U-20 Championship. Later that same year he was chosen for the 2023 FIFA U-20 World Cup, starting in Argentina in May 2023. A goal he scored at the tournament against Slovakia U-20 was highlighted by FIFA as one of the goals-of-the-tournament.
