= Adrián Ascues =

Peruvian footballer (born 2002)

Personal information
- Full name: Adrián Ademir Ascues Earl
- Date of birth: 15 November 2002 (age 23)
- Place of birth: Lima, Peru
- Position: Midfielder

Team information
- Current team: UCV (on loan from Cienciano)
- Number: 72

Youth career
- Sporting Cristal
- Deportivo Municipal

Senior career*
Years	Team	Apps	(Gls)
2020–2022	Deportivo Municipal	55	(10)
2023–2024	Sporting Cristal	27	(1)
2025–	Cienciano	11	(0)
2025–	→ UCV (loan)	8	(1)

International career^{‡}
2022	Peru U23	1	(0)
- * Club domestic league appearances and goals as of 14:52, 11 October 2025 (UTC) ‡ National team caps and goals as of 05:00, 1 September 2022 (UTC)

Adrián Ademir Ascues Earl (born 15 November 2002) is a Peruvian footballer who plays as a midfielder for Peruvian Segunda División side UCV, on loan from Cienciano.

== Career ==
=== Club career ===
Ascues joined Deportivo Municipal from Sporting Cristal. He got his official debut in the Peruvian Primera División for Deportivo Municipal at the age of 17 against Deportivo Llacuabamba on 8 September 2020. He started on the bench, but replaced Rodrigo Vilca after 81 minutes.

In the 2022 season in Deportivo Municipal, Ascues would become an important figure for the team as he score 10 goals, along with 2 assists throughout the season. Ahead of the 2023 season, Ascues returned to his former club, Sporting Cristal.

In January 2025, Ascues moved to Cienciano. He got his debut for the club on February 16, 2025, against Universitario. On 27 July 2025, he joined UCV on a loan deal until the end of the year.

== Personal life ==
Adrián's uncle, Carlos Ascues, is also a professional footballer.
