= Valentín Vidal =

Chilean footballer

Personal information
- Full name: Valentín Antonio Vidal Tapia
- Date of birth: 12 May 2004 (age 22)
- Place of birth: Chile
- Height: 1.85 m (6 ft 1 in)
- Position: Centre-back

Team information
- Current team: Everton (on loan from Unión Española)
- Number: 37

Youth career
- Unión Española

Senior career*
Years	Team	Apps	(Gls)
2023–	Unión Española	63	(1)
2026–	→ Everton (loan)	0	(0)

International career
2024	Chile U23	4	(0)
- * Club domestic league appearances and goals as of 3 February 2026

Valentín Antonio Vidal Tapia (born 12 May 2004) is a Chilean footballer who plays as a centre-back for Chilean Primera División side Everton de Viña del Mar on loan from Unión Española.

== Club career ==
A defender from the Unión Española youth ranks, Vidal made his senior debut in the 0–1 away win against Provincial Ovalle on 25 June 2022 for the Copa Chile. On 8 August 2024, he renewed with them until the 2027 season. Later, he made appearances in the 2025 Copa Sudamericana.

On 1 February 2026, Vidal joined Everton de Viña del Mar on a one-year loan.

== International career ==
Vidal represented the Chile national U23 team in the 2024 Pre-Olympic Tournament, making four appearances.

== Personal life ==
=== Controversies ===
On 4 December 2024, Vidal was accused and arrested for rape. Five days later, he was released for lack of evidence.
