= Esteban Matus =

Chilean footballer

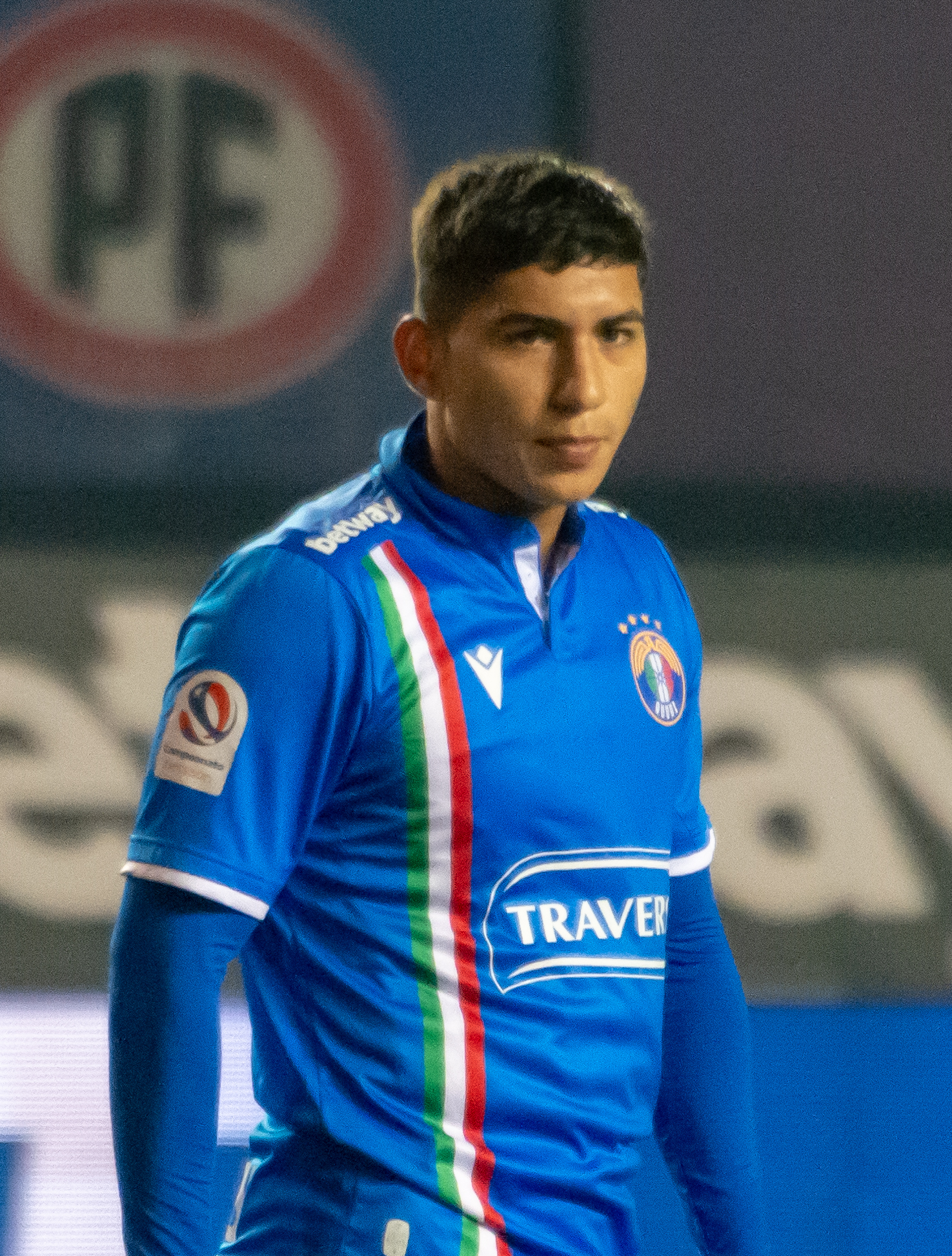
- Matus with Audax Italiano in 2023

Personal information
- Full name: Esteban Patricio Matus Castro
- Date of birth: 12 February 2002 (age 24)
- Place of birth: Estación Central, Santiago, Chile
- Height: 1.70 m (5 ft 7 in)
- Position: Left-back

Team information
- Current team: Olimpia
- Number: 17

Youth career
- Audax Italiano

Senior career*
Years	Team	Apps	(Gls)
2022–2026	Audax Italiano	93	(5)
2024	→ Unión La Calera (loan)	13	(0)
2026–	Olimpia	0	(0)

International career^{‡}
2024	Chile U23	1	(0)
- * Club domestic league appearances and goals as of 1 August 2026 ‡ National team caps and goals as of 3 February 2025

Esteban Patricio Matus Castro (born 12 February 2002) is a Chilean footballer who plays as a left-back for Paraguayan Primera División side Olimpia.

== Club career ==
Born in Estación Central commune, Santiago de Chile, Matus played baby-fútbol in his early career and took part in the 2015 Copa Enel with the Santiago city team.

A product of the Audax Italiano youth system, Matus made his senior debut in the Chilean Primera División match against Ñublense on 7 February 2022. In February 2024, Matus was loaned out to Unión La Calera. He returned to Audax Italiano in the second half of the same year.

In July 2026, Matus moved to Paraguay and signed with Olimpia under Pablo Sánchéz, former manager of Audax Italiano.

== International career ==
Matus represented Chile at under-23 level in the 2024 Pre-Olympic Tournament. He made an appearance in the 5–0 loss against Argentina.

At senior level, he received his first call up for the friendly match against Panama on 8 February 2025.
