= Miguel Monsalve =

Colombian footballer (born 2004)

Personal information
- Full name: Miguel Ángel Monsalve Gonzáles
- Date of birth: 27 February 2004 (age 22)
- Place of birth: Medellín, Colombia
- Height: 1.78 m (5 ft 10 in)
- Positions: Midfielder; forward

Team information
- Current team: Estudiantes (on loan from Grêmio)
- Number: 34

Youth career
- 2008–2020: Independiente Medellín

Senior career*
| Years | Team | Apps | (Gls) |
| 2020–2024 | Independiente Medellín | 75 | (9) |
| 2024– | Grêmio | 49 | (7) |
| 2026– | → Estudiantes (loan) | 3 | (1) |

International career^{‡}
| 2022– | Colombia U20 | 13 | (0) |
- * Club domestic league appearances and goals as of 17:42, 21 November 2026 (UTC) ‡ National team caps and goals as of 27 February 2025

Miguel Ángel Monsalve Gonzáles (born 27 February 2004) is a Colombian footballer who currently plays as a midfielder for Estudiantes, on loan from Grêmio.

== Club career ==
Born in Medellín, Monsalve began his career with local side Independiente Medellín at the age of four, following in the footsteps of his elder brother. Despite clubs in Colombia not officially allowed to have players below the age of five, Monsalve impressed coaches and was enrolled in the academy. He consistently stood out in the academy of Independiente, playing with players older than him each year, and was invited to train with the first team at the age of thirteen.

He made his professional debut for the club on 15 October 2020 in a 1–1 draw with Jaguares de Córdoba in the Categoría Primera A. The following year, he was named by English newspaper The Guardian as one of the sixty best young players born in 2004 worldwide.

== International career ==
Monsalve has represented Colombia at under-20 level.

== Style of play ==
Monsalve describes himself as an attacking midfielder, but says he is also capable of playing in the front three. A creative player, Monsalve has stated that he idolises Lionel Messi.

== Career statistics ==
=== Club ===
As of 29 March 2023.

Appearances and goals by club, season and competition
| Club | Season | League | | | Cup | | Continental | | Other | | Total | |
| Club | Season | Division | Apps | Goals | Apps | Goals | Apps | Goals | Apps | Goals | Apps | Goals |
|---|---|---|---|---|---|---|---|---|---|---|---|---|
| Independiente Medellín | 2020 | Categoría Primera A | 5 | 0 | 0 | 0 | 0 | 0 | 0 | 0 | 5 | 0 |
| Independiente Medellín | 2021 | Categoría Primera A | 3 | 0 | 0 | 0 | 0 | 0 | 0 | 0 | 3 | 0 |
| Independiente Medellín | 2022 | Categoría Primera A | 9 | 1 | 3 (Note: Appearances in the Copa Colombia) | 1 | 0 | 0 | 0 | 0 | 12 | 2 |
| Independiente Medellín | 2023 | Categoría Primera A | 10 | 2 | 0 | 0 | 3 (Note: Appearances in the Copa Libertadores) | 0 | 0 | 0 | 5 | 1 |
| Career total | | | 19 | 2 | 3 | 1 | 3 | 0 | 0 | 0 | 25 | 3 |

== Honours ==
Grêmio

- Campeonato Gaúcho: 2026
- Recopa Gaúcha: 2025
