= Justin Cuero =

Ecuadorian footballer (born 2004)

Personal information
- Full name: Justin Raúl Cuero Palacio
- Date of birth: 18 March 2004 (age 22)
- Place of birth: Esmeraldas, Ecuador
- Height: 1.84 m (6 ft 0 in)
- Position: Forward

Team information
- Current team: Independiente del Valle

Youth career
- 2017–2022: Independiente del Valle

Senior career*
Years	Team	Apps	(Gls)
2023–2024	Independiente del Valle	2	(0)
2023–2024	Independiente Juniors	6	(1)
2023–2024	→ Orenburg (loan)	13	(1)
2024–2026	Orenburg	7	(0)
2025	→ Emelec (loan)	17	(1)
2026–	Independiente del Valle	0	(0)

International career
2022–2024	Ecuador U20	9	(4)
Medal record
Men's football
Representing Ecuador
South American Games
Silver medal – second place	2022 Asunción	Team
- * Club domestic league appearances and goals as of 31 December 2025

Justin Raúl Cuero Palacio (born 18 March 2004) is an Ecuadorean football player who plays as a forward for Independiente del Valle. He played as Ecuador finished runners-up at the 2022 South American Games and represented his country at the 2023 South American U-20 Championship.

== Early life ==
Cuero is from Esmeraldas, Ecuador, in the north-western part of the country. He came from the Independiente del Valle football academy.

== Club career ==
Cuero made his Liga Pro debut for Independiente del Valle in a 3–1 home win against Mushuc Runa S.C. on February 25, 2023.

On 15 August 2023, Cuero joined Russian Premier League club Orenburg on loan with an option to buy.

On 20 February 2026, Orenburg announced Cuero's return to Independiente del Valle.

== International career ==
Cuero was selected to play Football at the 2022 South American Games in October 2022 for Ecuador in Asunción. He scored a hat-trick in the semi-final against Uruguay to help his team to the final against hosts Paraguay. Cuero excelled playing for Ecuador at the 2023 South American U-20 Championship. Cuero was Ecuador's top scorer in the initial phase of the tournament from which they qualified for the Hexagonal group stage. Cuero scored four goals in total at the tournament, including two against Paraguay that ensured his country finished in the top four and qualified from the Hexagonal group stage for the 2023 FIFA U-20 World Cup to be held in Indonesia. Cuero thanked the Ecuadorean fans for helping the team achieve their never-say-die attitude.

== Career statistics ==
=== Club ===
As of match played 24 May 2025

Appearances and goals by club, season and competition
Club	Season	League			Cup		Continental		Total	
Club	Season	Division	Apps	Goals	Apps	Goals	Apps	Goals	Apps	Goals
Independiente del Valle	2023	Ecuadorian Serie A	2	0	0	0	0	0	2	0
Independiente Juniors	2023	Serie B	0	0	0	0	5 (Note: Appearance(s) in U-20 Copa Libertadores)	0	5	0
Orenburg (loan)	2023–24	Russian Premier League	13	1	8	0	—		21	1
Orenburg	2024–25	Russian Premier League	7	0	4	2	—		11	2
Career total			22	1	12	2	5	0	39	3

== Style of play ==
Cuero has been described as a target man style centre forward, adept at playing on his own up-front. He has also been described as being “powerful physically and with good movements in the area to make space for himself”.
