= Daniel Luna =

Colombian footballer (born 2003)

Personal information
- Full name: Daniel Andrés Luna García
- Date of birth: 7 May 2003 (age 23)
- Place of birth: Cali, Colombia
- Height: 1.80 m (5 ft 11 in)
- Position: Attacking midfielder

Team information
- Current team: Mallorca

Youth career
- 2015–2020: Deportivo Cali

Senior career*
Years	Team	Apps	(Gls)
2021–2023	Deportivo Cali	42	(5)
2023	→ Mallorca B (loan)	4	(0)
2023–2024	Mallorca B	11	(2)
2023–	Mallorca	2	(0)
2024	→ Mirandés (loan)	9	(0)
2025	→ Cartagena (loan)	17	(3)
2025–2026	→ Huesca (loan)	32	(2)

International career^{‡}
2022–2023	Colombia U20	23	(3)
- * Club domestic league appearances and goals as of 9 June 2026 ‡ National team caps and goals as of 3 June 2023

Daniel Andrés Luna García (born 7 May 2003) is a Colombian professional footballer who plays as an attacking midfielder for Spanish club RCD Mallorca.

== Club career ==
Born in Cali, Luna joined his hometown side Deportivo Cali's youth setup in 2015, and was promoted to the first team ahead of the 2021 season. He made his first team – and Categoría Primera A – debut on 29 January 2021, coming on as a late substitute for Darwin Andrade in a 1–1 home draw against Envigado.

Luna scored his first professional goal on 11 December 2021, netting his team's second in a 2–0 home win over Atlético Junior. After finishing the 2021 season with one goal in 19 appearances, he contributed with four goals during the 2022 campaign, also playing in the Copa Libertadores.

On 11 January 2023, amidst interest from Spanish La Liga side Mallorca, Deportivo Cali released a statement to clarify that the transfer "was not confirmed". Late in the month, however, Mallorca announced the loan of Luna, with a buyout clause.

On 14 June 2023, despite only featuring for the reserves in Segunda Federación, Mallorca exercised Luna's buyout clause. He made his first team debut with the Bermellones on 1 November, replacing Cyle Larin in a 4–0 Copa del Rey away routing of CD Boiro.

On 1 February 2024, Luna was loaned to Segunda División side Mirandés for the remainder of the season. Upon returning, he made his debut in the Spanish top tier on 1 November, playing the last 11 minutes in a 1–0 away loss to Deportivo Alavés.

On 3 February 2025, Luna moved on another second tier loan to FC Cartagena. On 27 August, he renewed his contract with Mallorca until 2028, and was loaned to SD Huesca also in the second division.
