= Kevin Mantilla =

Colombian footballer (born 2003)

Personal information
- Full name: Kevin Andrés Mantilla Camargo
- Date of birth: 22 May 2003 (age 23)
- Place of birth: Bogotá, Colombia
- Height: 1.91 m (6 ft 3 in)
- Position: Centre-back

Team information
- Current team: Independiente Medellín (on loan from Talleres)
- Number: 4

Youth career
- Santa Fe

Senior career*
Years	Team	Apps	(Gls)
2022–2023	Santa Fe	31	(0)
2023–	Talleres	5	(0)
2025–	→ Independiente Medellín (loan)	8	(0)

International career^{‡}
2021–	Colombia U20	24	(1)
- * Club domestic league appearances and goals as of 11 December 2025 ‡ National team caps and goals as of 27 July 2023

Kevin Andrés Mantilla Camargo (born 22 May 2003) is a Colombian professional footballer who plays as a centre-back for Independiente Medellín, on loan from Argentine Primera División club Talleres.

== Club career ==
=== Santa Fe ===
While at Santa Fe, Mantilla briefly played alongside Francisco Meza, who he cited as a reference for his style of play. Following his impressive performances at the 2023 South American U-20 Championship, Mantilla was linked with a move to English Premier League side Liverpool.

=== Talleres ===
On 27 July 2023, Argentine Primera División side Talleres announced the signing of Mantilla on a four-year deal, paying a reported fee of €1.8 million for 80% of the player's economic rights.

== International career ==
=== Youth ===
Mantilla has represented Colombia at under-20 level.

== Career statistics ==
=== Club ===
As of 5 May 2023.

Appearances and goals by club, season and competition
Club	Season	League			Cup		Continental		Other		Total	
Club	Season	Division	Apps	Goals	Apps	Goals	Apps	Goals	Apps	Goals	Apps	Goals
Santa Fe	2022	Categoría Primera A	25	0	1 (Note: Appearances in the Copa Colombia)	0	—		0	0	26	0
Santa Fe	2023	Categoría Primera A	6	0	0	0	3	1	0	0	9	1
Career total			31	0	1	0	3	1	0	0	35	1
