= Marianyela Jiménez =

Venezuelan soccer player (born 2004)

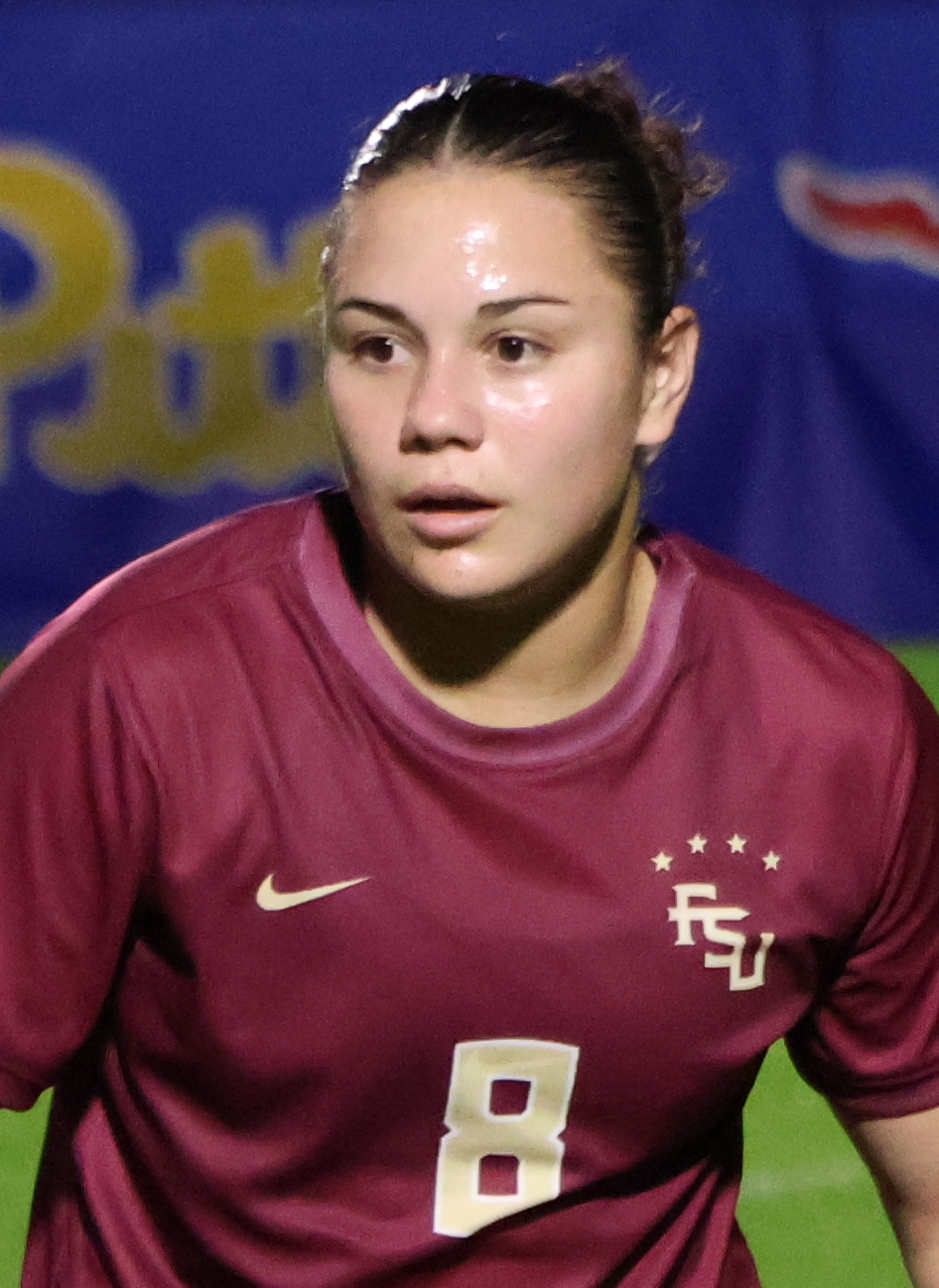
- Jiménez with Florida State in 2024

Personal information
- Full name: Marianyela Antonella Jiménez Zerpa
- Date of birth: April 16, 2004 (age 22)
- Height: 5 ft 4 in (1.63 m)
- Position: Midfielder

Team information
- Current team: Querétaro
- Number: 8

College career
Years	Team	Apps	(Gls)
2021–2023	William Carey Crusaders	66	(46)
2024–2025	Florida State Seminoles	16	(4)

Senior career*
Years	Team	Apps	(Gls)
2026–	Querétaro	5	(1)

International career^{‡}
2018	Venezuela U-17	2	(0)
2020–2024	Venezuela U-20	22	(6)
2023–	Venezuela	7	(1)
- * Club domestic league appearances and goals as of March 16, 2026 ‡ National team caps and goals as of September 7, 2024

Marianyela Antonella Jiménez Zerpa (born April 16, 2004) is a Venezuelan professional footballer player who plays as a midfielder for Liga MX Femenil club Querétaro and the Venezuela national team. She played college soccer for the William Carey Crusaders and the Florida State Seminoles, winning the 2025 national championship with the Seminoles.

== College career ==
Originally from Puerto Cabello, Jiménez moved to the United States in 2021 to attend William Carey University in Mississippi. She had scholarship support from Deyna Castellanos's Queen Deyna Program. In three seasons with the National Association of Intercollegiate Athletics (NAIA)–level Crusaders, she scored 46 goals in 66 games. She was named the NAIA Player of the Year in 2023 after scoring 21 goals in 25 games and leading the Crusaders to an NAIA national championship appearance.

Jiménez transferred to the NCAA champion Florida State Seminoles in 2024, scoring 4 goals in 16 games in her debut season. She scored two minutes into the ACC tournament first round against Notre Dame, before helping the Seminoles to their fifth consecutive conference tournament title, and scored one minute into the shootout loss to Vanderbilt in the NCAA tournament second round. In 2025, she played in 17 games and had 5 assists as the Seminoles won their fifth national title.

== Club career ==
Jiménez signed her first professional contract with Mexican club Querétaro in February 2026.

== International career ==
Jiménez represented the Venezuela under-20 team at three South American U-20 Women's Championships, starring at the 2024 edition in which she scored five goals in eight games. She started all three games for the under-20s at the 2024 FIFA U-20 Women's World Cup.

Jiménez made her senior debut for Venezuela on April 6, 2023, starting and playing 75 minutes in the friendly 1–1 draw against Argentina.

== Honors and awards ==
William Carey Crusaders

- NAIA women's soccer championship runner-up: 2021, 2023

Florida State Seminoles

- NCAA Division I women's soccer tournament: 2025
- ACC women's soccer tournament: 2024

Individual

- NAIA Player of the Year: 2023
