= Daniel Pedrozo =

Colombian footballer (born 2004)

Personal information
- Full name: Daniel Esteban Pedrozo Martínez
- Date of birth: 19 March 2004 (age 22)
- Place of birth: El Rocío, Bucaramanga, Colombia
- Height: 1.84 m (6 ft 0 in)
- Position: Defender

Team information
- Current team: Deportes Tolima

Youth career
- 2012–2018: Independiente Santander
- 2019: Arcos Zaragoza

Senior career*
Years	Team	Apps	(Gls)
2020–2023	Real Cartagena	53	(4)
2023–2026	Al Wasl	1	(0)
2026–	Deportes Tolima	0	(0)

International career
2019	Colombia U15	6	(0)
2020	Colombia U17	3	(0)
2022–	Colombia U20	12	(0)
- * Club domestic league appearances and goals as of 23:04, 13 February 2023 (UTC)

Daniel Esteban Pedrozo Martínez (born 19 March 2004) is a Colombian professional footballer currently playing as a defender for Deportes Tolima.

== Club career ==
Born in Bucaramanga, Pedrozo began his career with amateur side Independiente Santander, joining at the age of eight. He stayed with Independiente until the age of fourteen, and spent 2019 with Belén La Nubia Arco Zaragoza in Medellín. In January 2020, he signed with professional side Real Cartagena and was immediately integrated into the first team at the age of fifteen.

In early 2023, he was subject of a bid from an unnamed club from the United Arab Emirates.

== International career ==
Pedrozo represented Colombia at the 2023 South American U-20 Championship, where he was one of Colombia's best players during the tournament.

== Career statistics ==
=== Club ===
As of 13 March 2023.

Appearances and goals by club, season and competition
Club	Season	League			Cup		Other		Total	
Club	Season	Division	Apps	Goals	Apps	Goals	Apps	Goals	Apps	Goals
Real Cartagena	2020	Categoría Primera B	9	0	1 (Note: Appearances in the Copa Colombia)	0	0	0	10	0
Real Cartagena	2021	Categoría Primera B	21	1	4	1	0	0	25	2
Real Cartagena	2022	Categoría Primera B	25	2	0	0	0	0	25	2
Real Cartagena	2023	Categoría Primera B	4	1	1	0	0	0	5	1
Career total			59	4	6	1	0	0	65	5
