= Andrés Salazar =

Colombian footballer (born 2003)

Personal information
- Full name: Andrés Salazar Osorio
- Date of birth: 15 January 2003 (age 23)
- Place of birth: Guarne, Colombia
- Height: 1.82 m (6 ft 0 in)
- Position: Left-back

Team information
- Current team: Riga FC
- Number: 17

Youth career
- Manantiales
- Atlético Nacional

Senior career*
Years	Team	Apps	(Gls)
2021–2025	Atlético Nacional	48	(2)
2021	→ Valledupar (loan)	9	(1)
2022	→ Fortaleza CEIF (loan)	26	(1)
2024	→ Heart of Midlothian (loan)	1	(0)
2026–	Riga FC	23	(2)

International career^{‡}
2021–	Colombia U20	30	(1)
2023–	Colombia	1	(0)
- * Club domestic league appearances and goals as of 12 November 2026 ‡ National team caps and goals as of 21:36, 16 June 2023 (UTC)

Andrés Salazar Osorio (born 15 January 2003) is a Colombian professional footballer who plays as a left-back for Latvian Higher League club Riga FC. He has also represented Colombia at senior international level.

== Early life ==
Salazar was born in Guarne in the Antioquia Department, and grew up in the Camilo Torres de Guarne neighbourhood.

== Club career ==
Salazar started his career with grassroots side Manantiales, before moving to professional side Atlético Nacional. While in the academy, he suffered a potentially career-threatening injury, but was able to overcome it to continue his development. He was loaned to Categoría Primera B sides Valledupar and Fortaleza C.E.I.F. for the 2021 and 2022 seasons, respectively.

In a Categoría Primera A match between Atlético Nacional and América de Cali, Salazar injured América de Cali's Spanish forward Iago Falque with a strong challenge. He received criticism for the perceived malice in his challenge, which Salazar denied, stating that there was "no bad intention" and that he hoped Falque "recovers soon". Falque himself would go on to state that Salazar had sent him a message to apologise, and that he had forgiven him for the incident, describing the injury as "involuntary".

Following impressive performances with the Colombia under-20 squad, Salazar was linked with a move to Mexican side Club América.

On 15 August 2024, Salazar joined Scottish Premiership side Heart of Midlothian on a season-long loan deal. On 4 January 2025, Hearts had announced that Salazar had left the club to return to Atlético Nacional.

On 5 February 2026, Salazar joined Latvian Higher League club Riga FC on a contract.

== International career ==
Salazar has represented Colombia at under-20 level. He made his debut for the senior team on 16 June 2023 in a 1–0 win against Iraq.

== Career statistics ==
=== Club ===
As of 14 June 2026.

Appearances and goals by club, season and competition
Club	Season	League			Cup		Continental		Other		Total	
Club	Season	Division	Apps	Goals	Apps	Goals	Apps	Goals	Apps	Goals	Apps	Goals
Atlético Nacional	2023	Categoría Primera A	7	0	0	0	(Note: Appearances in the Copa Libertadores)4	0	0	0	11	0
Atlético Nacional	2024	Categoría Primera A	15	1	0	0	0	0	0	0	15	1
Atlético Nacional	2025	Categoría Primera A	26	1	6	1	0	0	(Note: Appearances in the Colombian Super Cup)2	0	34	2
Atlético Nacional	total		48	2	6	1	4	0	2	0	60	3
Valledupar (loan)	2021	Categoría Primera B	9	1	2 (Note: Appearances in the Copa Colombia)	0	–		0	0	11	1
Fortaleza C.E.I.F. (loan)	2022	Categoría Primera B	26	1	4	0	–		0	0	30	1
Riga FC	2026	Latvian Higher League	8	1	0	0	0	0	1 (Note: Appearances in the Latvian Supercup)	0	9	1
Career total			91	5	12	1	4	0	3	0	110	6
