= Kevin Pereira (footballer) =

Paraguayan footballer (born 2004)

Personal information
- Full name: Kevin Tadeo Pereira Leguizamon
- Date of birth: 15 January 2004 (age 22)
- Place of birth: Asunción, Paraguay
- Height: 1.66 m (5 ft 5 in)
- Position: Forward

Team information
- Current team: Sportivo Luqueño
- Number: 7

Youth career
- Río Salado de Limpio
- 2017–2018: Capiatá

Senior career*
Years	Team	Apps	(Gls)
2018–2022	Capiatá	5	(0)
2022–2023	Talleres	1	(0)
2023	→ Juárez (loan)	1	(0)
2023–	Sportivo Luqueño	34	(2)

International career^{‡}
2019	Paraguay U15	6	(2)
2019–2020	Paraguay U16	5	(3)
2021	Paraguay U17		
2022–	Paraguay U20	5	(2)
- * Club domestic league appearances and goals as of 13 August 2025 ‡ National team caps and goals as of 11:19, 18 January 2023 (UTC)

Kevin Tadeo Pereira Leguizamon (born 15 January 2004) is a Paraguayan footballer who plays as a forward for Paraguayan side Sportivo Luqueño.

== Club career ==
Pereira started his career with amateur side Río Salado de Limpio, and was recruited by Deportivo Capiatá at the age of thirteen. He made his debut for Capiatá at the age of fourteen in the Copa Paraguay against Teniente Fariña, becoming the youngest professional footballer in the country at the time.

Just after his eighteenth birthday, he moved to Argentina to join Talleres de Córdoba, stating that he felt "as if he were at home" with the Córdoba-based club.

== International career ==
Pereira has represented Paraguay at youth international level.

== Career statistics ==
=== Club ===
As of 18 January 2023.

Appearances and goals by club, season and competition
Club	Season	League			Cup		Other		Total	
Club	Season	Division	Apps	Goals	Apps	Goals	Apps	Goals	Apps	Goals
Capiatá	2018	Paraguayan Primera División	2	0	2 (Note: Appearances in the Copa Paraguay)	0	0	0	4	0
Capiatá	2019	Paraguayan Primera División	3	0	0	0	0	0	3	0
Capiatá	2020	Paraguayan División Intermedia	– (Note: The 2020 season of the División Intermedia was cancelled by the Paraguayan Football Association due to the COVID-19 pandemic.)							
Capiatá	2021	Paraguayan División Intermedia	–		0	0	0	0	0	0
Capiatá	Total		5	0	2	0	0	0	7	0
Talleres	2022	Argentine Primera División	0	0	0	0	0	0	0	0
Talleres	2023	Argentine Primera División	0	0	0	0	0	0	0	0
Talleres	Total		0	0	0	0	0	0	0	0
Career total			5	0	2	0	0	0	7	0
