= Jhon Vélez =

Colombian footballer (born 2003)

Personal information
- Full name: Jhon Jaider Vélez Carey
- Date of birth: 25 July 2003 (age 23)
- Place of birth: Rebolo, Barranquilla, Colombia
- Height: 1.76 m (5 ft 9 in)
- Position: Midfielder

Team information
- Current team: Atlético Junior
- Number: 5

Youth career
- Atalanta Luz
- Todo bien por Killa
- Quilla
- 2018–2021: Barranquilla

Senior career*
Years	Team	Apps	(Gls)
2021–2022	Barranquilla	44	(0)
2023–	Atlético Junior	49	(0)

International career^{‡}
2021–	Colombia U20	21	(1)
- * Club domestic league appearances and goals as of 15 May 2025 ‡ National team caps and goals as of 2 April 2023

Jhon Jaider Vélez Carey (born 25 July 2003) is a Colombian footballer who plays as a midfielder for Atlético Junior.

== Early life ==
Born in the Rebolo neighbourhood of Barranquilla, Vélez is the youngest of three siblings. He took an interest in football as a child, going as far as to sneak out through a hole in his patio to go play, after his mother had scolded him for playing outside of curfew. He met local amateur football coach Carlos de la Rosa, who would help him financially with boots, kit and travel expenses when his family were unable to do so.

== Club career ==
=== Early career ===
Vélez played his first organised football with Atalanta Luz de Sión, before being invited to join a district team named Todo bien por Killa in 2015, with whom he participated in the La Liga Promises 2015, where he faced a number of Spanish sides. He played for Quilla FC before trialling successfully with professional side Barranquilla in 2018.

=== Barranquilla ===
Vélez progressed to under-17 level with Barranquilla, before the COVID-19 pandemic in Colombia meant that he was unable to train with the team. He was forced to return to playing on the streets, avoiding police and the mandatory isolation put in place by the Colombian government, as well as training with coach de la Rosa. He started picking and selling fruit and vegetables with his uncle, waking up at 4am and working twelve-hour shifts until 4pm to be able to provide for his family.

As organised football gradually returned, Vélez made his debut with Barranquilla in the Categoría Primera B on 1 February 2021, coming on as a second-half substitute for Juan David Martínez in a 1–0 loss to Real Cartagena. After the next game, where he started in a 1–0 win against Real Santander, he was offered his first professional contract.

=== Atlético Junior ===
Following impressive performances with Barranquilla, the team's parent club, Atlético Junior, and their manager at the time, Juan Cruz Real, wanted to promote Vélez to the team, but Barranquilla coach Arturo Reyes decided against the move, as he considered the experience in the Colombian second division to be better for Vélez. However, the following year, Vélez followed Reyes in joining Atlético Junior, and made his debut in a 1–0 loss to Deportivo Pasto on 19 February 2023. Despite not featuring in every game for Atlético Junior, his performances for the team, as well as at youth international level, caught the eye of English side Brighton & Hove Albion and Portuguese side Porto.

== International career ==
Vélez has represented Colombia at under-20 level.

== Style of play ==
Initially a centre-back at youth level, due to his height advantage over his teammates at the time, he was converted to play as a defensive midfielder by Barranquilla coach Roberto Peñaloza, after Peñaloza watched him on his debut and decided he was too small to play in defence.

== Career statistics ==
=== Club ===
As of 29 June 2023.

Appearances and goals by club, season and competition
Club	Season	League			Cup		Continental		Other		Total	
Club	Season	Division	Apps	Goals	Apps	Goals	Apps	Goals	Apps	Goals	Apps	Goals
Barranquilla	2021	Categoría Primera B	23	0	4 (Note: Appearances in the Copa Colombia)	0	–		0	0	27	0
Barranquilla	2022	Categoría Primera B	21	0	1	0	–		0	0	22	0
Barranquilla	Total		44	0	5	0	0	0	0	0	49	0
Atlético Junior	2023	Categoría Primera A	6	0	0	0	1 (Note: Appearances in the Copa Sudamericana)	0	0	0	7	0
Career total			50	0	5	0	1	0	0	0	56	0

== Honours ==
Junior

- Categoría Primera A: 2023-II
