= Sebastián Girado =

Colombian footballer (born 2004)

Personal information
- Full name: Sebastián David Girado Díaz
- Date of birth: 11 August 2004 (age 22)
- Place of birth: Cartagena, Bolívar, Colombia
- Height: 1.65 m (5 ft 5 in)
- Position: Forward

Team information
- Current team: Famalicão (on loan from Real Cartagena)

Youth career
- Arcos Zaragoza

Senior career*
Years	Team	Apps	(Gls)
2020–	Real Cartagena	77	(11)
2023–	→ Famalicão (loan)	0	(0)

International career^{‡}
2019	Colombia U15	7	(3)
2020	Colombia U16	3	(1)
2022–	Colombia U20	5	(1)
- * Club domestic league appearances and goals as of 16:53, 14 September 2023 (UTC) ‡ National team caps and goals as of 21:36, 14 September 2023 (UTC)

Sebastián David Girado Díaz (born 11 August 2004) is a Colombian footballer who currently plays as a forward for Portuguese Primeira Liga side Famalicão, on loan from Real Cartagena.

== Club career ==
Born in Cartagena, in the Bolívar Department of Colombia, Girado first came to prominence for his performances in the under-15 interclub league, where he finished top scorer with twenty-six goals for Medellín-based club Belén la Nubia Arco Zaragoza. These goal-scoring feats earned him a call up to the Colombia under-15 team for the 2019 South American U-15 Championship, and following the tournament, he joined Categoría Primera B side Real Cartagena.

Having made his debut for Real Cartagena in February 2020, he began to be linked with a number of clubs in Europe, including Manchester City, Manchester United and Porto. He continued to impress with his performances the following season, and he established himself as a goal-scorer in the second division, most notably scoring two goals in a 3–3 away draw with Orsomarso.

Girado started the 2023 season with Real Cartagena, but in July of the same year, the club's technical director, Martín Cardetti, stated that he would be leaving the team, and joining a club in Portugal. Days later, it was announced that this unnamed club was Famalicão, and that Girado had joined on an initial one-year loan deal with a purchase option.

== International career ==
Girado has represented Colombia at under-15, under-16 and under-20 level.

== Career statistics ==
=== Club ===
As of 14 September 2023.

Appearances and goals by club, season and competition
Club	Season	League			Cup		Other		Total	
Club	Season	Division	Apps	Goals	Apps	Goals	Apps	Goals	Apps	Goals
Real Cartagena	2020	Categoría Primera B	11	2	1 (Note: Appearances in the Copa Colombia)	1	0	0	12	3
Real Cartagena	2021	Categoría Primera B	20	3	3	0	0	0	23	3
Real Cartagena	2022	Categoría Primera B	28	4	0	0	0	0	28	4
Real Cartagena	2023	Categoría Primera B	18	2	6	2	0	0	24	4
Real Cartagena	Total		77	11	10	3	0	0	87	14
Famalicão (loan)	2023–24	Primeira Liga	0	0	0	0	0	0	0	0
Career total			77	11	10	3	0	0	87	14
