= Raiderlin Carrasco =

Venezuelan footballer (born 2002)

Personal information
- Full name: Raiderlin Nazareth Carrasco Vargas
- Date of birth: 11 June 2002 (age 24)
- Place of birth: Caracas, Venezuela
- Height: 1.59 m (5 ft 3 in)
- Position: Forward

Team information
- Current team: Madrid CFF
- Number: 14

Senior career*
Years	Team	Apps	(Gls)
2022–2024	Sporting de Huelva	54	(3)
2024–2026	Levante	46	(3)
2026–	Madrid CFF	8	(1)

International career^{‡}
2022	Venezuela U20	7	(0)
2022–	Venezuela	32	(2)
- * Club domestic league appearances and goals as of 18:54, 16 November 2026 (UTC) ‡ National team caps and goals as of 18:54, 16 November 2026 (UTC)

Raiderlin Nazareth Carrasco Vargas (born 11 June 2002) is a Venezuelan professional footballer who plays as a forward for Liga F club Madrid CFF and the Venezuela national team.
