= Alexis Manyoma =

Colombian footballer (born 2003)

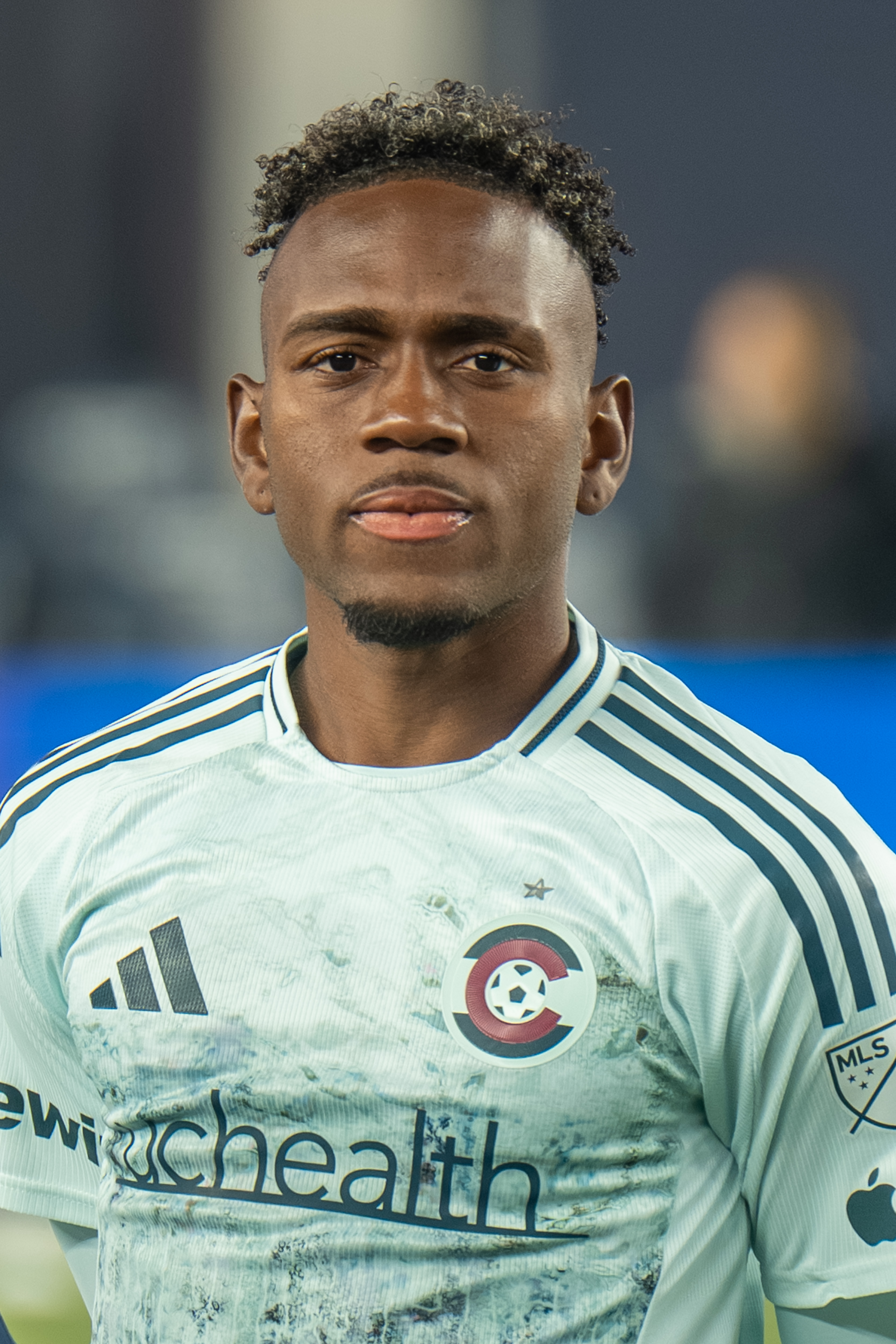
- Manyoma with the Colorado Rapids in 2026

Personal information
- Full name: Alexis Castillo Manyoma
- Date of birth: 30 January 2003 (age 23)
- Place of birth: Puerto Tejada, Colombia
- Height: 1.68 m (5 ft 6 in)
- Position: Winger

Team information
- Current team: Deportivo Cali (on loan from Estudiantes)
- Number: 14

Youth career
- Cortuluá

Senior career*
Years	Team	Apps	(Gls)
2020–2023	Cortuluá	73	(8)
2023–	Estudiantes de La Plata	41	(4)
2025–2026	→ Colorado Rapids (loan)	14	(1)
2026–	→ Deportivo Cali (loan)	7	(1)

International career
2021–	Colombia U20	31	(4)
- * Club domestic league appearances and goals as of 17:05, 4 October 2026 (UTC)

Alexis Castillo Manyoma (born 30 January 2003) is a Colombian professional footballer who currently plays as a winger for Deportivo Cali, on loan from Primera División club Estudiantes de La Plata.

== Club career ==
In February 2023, following the conclusion of the 2023 South American U-20 Championship, Manyoma was linked with a move to Categoría Primera A side Independiente Santa Fe. Manyoma had already reportedly signed for Independiente Santa Fe, with the club officially announcing him as their player for the 2023 season in December 2022. Given his high potential, the deal included a clause which would allow him to leave if an offer from an overseas club came in.

However, his coaches at Cortuluá decided that he would get more minutes in the Colombian second division, in the hopes that he would then be called up for the 2023 FIFA U-20 World Cup, and cancelled the deal with Independiente Santa Fe.

On 12 August 2023, an agreement was announced by Argentine Primera División side Estudiantes de La Plata to sign Manyoma. A post published on Estudiantes' social media accounts the same day unveiled Manyoma was signed to a 4-year contract through 2027.

On 8 August 2025, Manyoma joined MLS side Colorado Rapids on a one-year loan, with an option for a permanent transfer.

== International career ==
Having represented Colombia at the 2023 South American U-20 Championship, Manyoma was again called up to the squad for the 2023 FIFA U-20 World Cup. He gave an interview before Colombia's opening game against Israel, stating that it was "very important start with a win; [as] it gives the team a lot of confidence for the following games".

== Career statistics ==
=== Club ===
As of 27 November 2023.

Appearances and goals by club, season and competition
Club	Season	League			Cup		Continental		Other		Total	
Club	Season	Division	Apps	Goals	Apps	Goals	Apps	Goals	Apps	Goals	Apps	Goals
Cortuluá	2020	Categoría Primera B	12	0	2 (Note: Appearances in the Copa Colombia)	0	–		0	0	14	0
Cortuluá	2021	Categoría Primera B	18	1	1	0	–		0	0	19	1
Cortuluá	2022	Categoría Primera A	35	5	1	0	–		0	0	36	5
Cortuluá	2023	Categoría Primera B	8	2	0	0	–		0	0	8	2
Estudiantes de La Plata	2023	Argentine Primera División	8	1	1	0			0	0	8	1
Career total			73	8	4	0	0	0	0	0	77	8

== Honours ==
Estudiantes

- Copa Argentina: 2023
- Copa de la Liga Profesional: 2024
- Trofeo de Campeones de la Liga Profesional: 2024
