= Wendy Carballo =

Uruguayan footballer (born 2002)

Personal information
- Full name: Wendy Naiely Carballo Rosa
- Date of birth: 28 July 2002 (age 24)
- Place of birth: Melo, Uruguay
- Height: 1.57 m (5 ft 2 in)
- Position: Forward

Team information
- Current team: Peñarol

Senior career*
Years	Team	Apps	(Gls)
20??–2021	Arachanas		
2021	Internacional	16	(1)
202?–	Peñarol		

International career^{‡}
2018	Uruguay U17	6	(0)
2020–2022	Uruguay U20	11	(6)
2019–	Uruguay	5	(1)
- * Club domestic league appearances and goals as of 5 September 2021 ‡ National team caps and goals as of 18 July 2022

Wendy Naiely Carballo Rosa (born 28 July 2002) is a Uruguayan professional footballer who plays as a forward for Peñarol and the Uruguay women's national team.

== Club career ==
Carballo has played for Arachanas Cerro Largo in Uruguay.

== International career ==
Carballo represented Uruguay at the 2018 South American U-17 Women's Championship. She made her senior debut on 6 October 2019 in a 0–3 friendly loss to Chile.

=== International goals ===
Scores and results list Uruguay's goal tally first

No.	Date	Venue	Opponent	Score	Result	Competition
1.	8 October 2019	Estadio El Teniente, Rancagua, Chile	Chile	1–0	1–3	Friendly
2.	24 February 2024	Estadio Charrúa, Montevideo, Uruguay	Peru	1–3	1–3	Friendly
