= Matías Segovia =

Paraguayan footballer (born 2003)

Personal information
- Full name: Matías Emanuel Segovia Torales
- Date of birth: 4 January 2003 (age 23)
- Place of birth: Caaguazú, Paraguay
- Height: 1.65 m (5 ft 5 in)
- Position: Winger

Team information
- Current team: América Mineiro (on loan from RWDM Brussels)
- Number: 77

Youth career
- –2019: Guaraní

Senior career*
Years	Team	Apps	(Gls)
2019–2023	Guaraní	43	(2)
2023–2025	Botafogo	21	(0)
2024	→ RWDM Brussels (loan)	7	(0)
2024–2025	→ Al Ain (loan)	9	(1)
2025–	RWDM Brussels	15	(2)
2026–	→ América Mineiro (loan)	33	(6)

International career^{‡}
2019	Paraguay U17	13	(4)
2022–2023	Paraguay U20	15	(1)
- * Club domestic league appearances and goals as of 18 November 2026 ‡ National team caps and goals as of 12 February 2023

Matías Emanuel Segovia Torales (born 4 January 2003), known as Segovinha, is a Paraguayan professional footballer who plays as a winger for Brazilian club América Mineiro, on loan from Belgian Challenger Pro League club RWDM Brussels.

== Career statistics ==
=== Club ===
As of 15 December 2019.

Club	Season	League			Cup		Continental		Other		Total	
Club	Season	Division	Apps	Goals	Apps	Goals	Apps	Goals	Apps	Goals	Apps	Goals
Club Guaraní	2019	Paraguayan Primera División	1	0	0	0	0	0	0	0	1	0
Career total			1	0	0	0	0	0	0	0	1	0

== Honours ==
Paraguay U20

- South American Games: 2022
