= Luis Marquinez =

Colombian footballer (born 2003)

Personal information
- Full name: Luis Miguel Marquinez Preciado
- Date of birth: 10 April 2003 (age 23)
- Place of birth: Tumaco, Nariño, Colombia
- Height: 1.87 m (6 ft 2 in)
- Position: Goalkeeper

Team information
- Current team: Atlético Nacional
- Number: 25

Youth career
- Sol de Oriente - JCO
- 2020–2022: Atlético Nacional

Senior career*
Years	Team	Apps	(Gls)
2022–	Atlético Nacional	18	(0)

International career^{‡}
- Colombia U19
2021–	Colombia U20	7	(0)
2023	Colombia U23	2	(0)
- * Club domestic league appearances and goals as of 11 December 2025 ‡ National team caps and goals as of 16:53, 5 January 2023 (UTC)

Luis Miguel Marquinez Preciado (born 10 April 2003) is a Colombian footballer who currently plays as a goalkeeper for Atlético Nacional.

== Club career ==
Born in Tumaco, Nariño Department, Marquinez started his career with amateur side Club Deportivo Sol de Oriente JCO. On 11 July 2022, despite being the third-choice goalkeeper at Atlético Nacional at the time, he made his professional debut in a 1–1 Categoría Primera A game against Cortuluá. With Aldair Quintana reportedly to be leaving the club ahead of the 2023 season, Marquinez was tipped to be made second-choice goalkeeper.

== International career ==
Marquinez has represented Colombia at under-19 and under-20 level. He was called up to the under-20 side for the 2023 South American U-20 Championship.

== Career statistics ==
=== Club ===
As of match played 9 December 2024.

Appearances and goals by club, season and competition
Club	Season	League			Cup		Continental		Other		Total	
Club	Season	Division	Apps	Goals	Apps	Goals	Apps	Goals	Apps	Goals	Apps	Goals
Atlético Nacional	2021	Categoría Primera A	0	0	0	0	0	0	—		0	0
Atlético Nacional	2022	Categoría Primera A	3	0	0	0	0	0	—		3	0
Atlético Nacional	2023	Categoría Primera A	0	0	2	0	0	0	—		2	0
Atlético Nacional	2024	Categoría Primera A	9	0	0	0	0	0	—		9	0
Career total			12	0	2	0	0	0	0	0	14	0
