= Ángel González (Paraguayan footballer) =

Paraguayan footballer (born 2003)

Angel Gonzalez
Personal information
- Full name: Ángel Ariel González González
- Date of birth: 4 February 2003 (age 23)
- Place of birth: Asunción, Paraguay
- Height: 1.87 m (6 ft 2 in)
- Position: Goalkeeper

Team information
- Current team: Club Libertad
- Number: 25

Youth career
- Club Libertad

Senior career*
| Years | Team | Apps | (Gls) |
| 2021– | Club Libertad | 2 | (0) |
| 2021–2022 | → Porto B (loan) | 0 | (0) |

International career^{‡}
| 2019 | Paraguay U16 | 2 | (0) |
| 2019 | Paraguay U17 | 5 | (0) |
| 2019 | Paraguay U18 | 1 | (0) |
- * Club domestic league appearances and goals as of 12 August 2025 ‡ National team caps and goals as of 17:04, 26 April 2022 (UTC)

Ángel Ariel González González (born 4 February 2003) is a Paraguayan footballer currently playing as a goalkeeper for Club Libertad.

== Club career ==
In 2021, after first-choice goalkeeper Martín Silva contracted COVID-19 and backup goalkeeper Carlos Servín was injured, González was given two games in the Club Libertad first team.

== International career ==
González has represented Paraguay at youth international level. In January 2022, he was called up to the Paraguay senior national team during the 2022 FIFA World Cup qualification. On 9 July 2024, he withdrew from the Paraguayan squad for the 2024 Summer Olympics due to injury.

== Club statistics ==
As of 26 April 2022.

| Club | Season | League | | | Cup | | Other | | Total | |
| Club | Season | Division | Apps | Goals | Apps | Goals | Apps | Goals | Apps | Goals |
|---|---|---|---|---|---|---|---|---|---|---|
| Club Libertad | 2021 | Paraguayan Primera División | 2 | 0 | 0 | 0 | 0 | 0 | 2 | 0 |
| Club Libertad | 2022 | Paraguayan Primera División | 0 | 0 | 0 | 0 | 0 | 0 | 0 | 0 |
| Club Libertad | Total | | 2 | 0 | 0 | 0 | 0 | 0 | 2 | 0 |
| Porto B (loan) | 2021–22 | Liga Portugal 2 | 0 | 0 | – | | 0 | 0 | 0 | 0 |
| Career total | | | 2 | 0 | 0 | 0 | 0 | 0 | 2 | 0 |

== Honours ==
Paraguay U20

- South American Games: 2022
