= Alan Núñez =

Paraguayan footballer (born 2004)

Personal information
- Full name: Alan Herminio Núñez Duarte
- Date of birth: October 1, 2004 (age 22)
- Place of birth: Luque, Paraguay
- Height: 1.78 m (5 ft 10 in)
- Position: Right-back

Team information
- Current team: Argentinos Juniors (on loan from Cerro Porteño)
- Number: 30

Youth career
- 2022: Cerro Porteño

Senior career*
| Years | Team | Apps | (Gls) |
| 2022– | Cerro Porteño | 27 | (0) |
| 2025–2026 | → Nacional (loan) | 21 | (1) |
| 2026– | → Argentinos Juniors (loan) | 0 | (0) |

International career^{‡}
| 2020 | Paraguay U16 | 3 | (0) |
| 2022–2023 | Paraguay U20 | 16 | (0) |
| 2023– | Paraguay Olympic | 16 | (1) |
- * Club domestic league appearances and goals as of 16:35, 19 August 2026 (UTC) ‡ National team caps and goals as of 15 November 2025

Alan Herminio Núñez Duarte (born 1 October 2004) is a Paraguayan footballer who plays as a right-back for AFA Liga Profesional de Fútbol club Argentinos Juniors, on loan from Paraguayan Primera División club Cerro Porteño.

He has also represented Paraguay at the youth level, playing for the U-20 and the U-23.

== Career ==
=== Cerro Porteño ===
Núñez began his career in the youth divisions of Cerro Porteño, where he excelled as a right-back. In 2022, he was promoted to the first team and made his debut on 15 May 2022, in a Paraguayan Primera División match, a 2-1 loss against Sol de América.

==== 2025–26: Loan to Nacional ====
On 4 July 2025, it was announced that Núñez had joined Nacional on loan.

== International career ==
In 2023, he participated in the U-20 Copa Libertadores held in Chile with Cerro Porteño's youth team, finishing in third place. During the tournament, he played a total of five matches.

That same year, he was called up to the Paraguay national under-20 football team to play in the South American U-20 Championship held in Colombia. In 2024, he won the CONMEBOL Pre-Olympic Tournament held in Venezuela, securing Paraguay's qualification for the 2024 Summer Olympics.

== Career statistics ==
=== Club ===
| Season | Club | League | Apps | Goals | National Cup | Apps | Goals | Continental | Apps | Goals | Total Apps | Total Goals |
|---|---|---|---|---|---|---|---|---|---|---|---|---|
| 2022 | Club Cerro Porteño | Paraguayan Primera División | 2 | 0 | Copa Paraguay 2022 | 1 | 0 | 2022 Copa Libertadores | 0 | 0 | 3 | 0 |
| 2023 | Club Cerro Porteño | Paraguayan Primera División | 15 | 0 | Copa Paraguay 2023 | 1 | 0 | 2023 Copa Libertadores | 0 | 0 | 16 | 0 |
| 2024 | Club Cerro Porteño | Paraguayan Primera División | 7 | 0 | Copa Paraguay 2024 | 1 | 0 | 2024 Copa Libertadores+2024 Copa Sudamericana | 0 | 0 | 8 | 0 |
| Career Total | | | 24 | 0 | | 3 | 0 | | 0 | 0 | 27 | 0 |

=== International ===
| Tournament | Edition | Matches | Goals | Assists |
|---|---|---|---|---|
| Olympic Games | Paris 2024 | 4 | 0 | 0 |
| Pre-Olympic South American Tournament | Venezuela 2024 | 6 | 1 | 0 |
| South American U-20 Championship | 2023 | 9 | 0 | 1 |
| South American U-15 Championship | 2019 | 2 | 0 | 0 |

== Honours ==
Paraguay U20

- South American Games: 2022
