= 2025 Club Alianza Lima season =

Club Alianza Lima
2025 season
- Manager: Néstor Gorosito
- Stadium: Alejandro Villanueva Stadium
- Liga 1 Torneo Apertura: 2nd
- Liga 1 Torneo Clausura: 4th
- Copa Libertadores: Group stage
- Copa Sudamericana: Quarter-finals
- Top goalscorer: League: Paolo Guerrero (15); All: Paolo Guerrero (18)
- Average home league attendance: 24,548
- Biggest win: Alianza Lima 3–0 Cusco
- Biggest defeat: ADT 3–0 Alianza Lima
Home colours	Away colours

The 2025 season was the 124th in the history of Alianza Lima and their ninth consecutive campaign in the top tier of Peruvian football. The club competed in Liga 1 and the Copa Libertadores. Alianza Lima drew the second-highest average home league attendance in the 2025 season with 22,837. The highest average was recorded by Universitario de Deportes with 38,523.

== Squad ==
=== Transfers In ===
Pos.	Player	Transferred from	Fee	Date	Source
MF	(Peru) Jean Pierre Archimbaud	(Peru) Melgar	Free	1 January 2025	
DF	(Argentina) Juan Pablo Freytes	(Argentina) Newell's Old Boys	€610,000	1 January 2025	
GK	(Bolivia) Guillermo Viscarra	(Bolivia) The Strongest	Undiclosed	1 January 2025	
DF	(Argentina) Guillermo Enrique	(Argentina) Gimnasia y Esgrima La Plata	Loan	3 January 2025	
MF	(Ecuador) Fernando Gaibor	(Ecuador) Barcelona	Free	4 January 2025	
DF	(Peru) Miguel Trauco	(Brazil) Criciúma	Free	6 January 2025	
MF	(Ecuador) Erick Castillo	(Brazil) Vitória	Free	7 January 2025	
MF	(Uruguay) Pablo Lavandeira	(Peru) Melgar	Free	9 January 2025	
FW	(Argentina) Alan Cantero	(Argentina) Godoy Cruz	Loan	11 January 2025	
MF	(Uruguay) Pablo Ceppelini	(Colombia) Atlético Nacional	Free	11 January 2025	
MF	(Argentina) Gaspar Gentile	(Peru) Cienciano	€130,000	1 July 2025	
DF	(Peru) Josué Estrada	(Peru) Cienciano	Undisclosed	8 July 2025	
MF	(Peru) Sergio Peña	(Greece) PAOK	Undisclosed	9 July 2025	
MF	(Peru) Alessandro Burlamaqui	(Spain) CF Intercity	Free	10 July 2025	
DF	(Peru) Gianfranco Chávez	(Peru) Sporting Cristal	Undisclosed	7 August 2025	
MF	(Peru) Pedro Aquino	(Mexico) Santos Laguna	Loan	19 August 2025	

=== Transfers Out ===
Pos.	Player	Transferred to	Fee	Date	Source
DF	(Argentina) Juan Pablo Freytes	(Brazil) Fluminense	Undisclosed	3 January 2025	
FW	(Panama) Cecilio Waterman	(Chile) Coquimbo Unido	Free	7 January 2025	
MF	(Peru) Axel Moyano	(Peru) ADT	Free	10 January 2025	
MF	(Argentina) Adrián Arregui	(Argentina) Temperley	Free	11 January 2025	
MF	(Peru) Óscar Pinto	(Peru) ADT	Free	29 January 2025	
MF	(Peru) Franco Zanelatto	(Greece) OFI	Free	2 February 2025	
MF	(Peru) Piero Vivanco	(Peru) Melgar	Free	6 February 2025	
MF	(Peru) Luis Navea	(Peru) Alianza Atlético	Loan	5 March 2025	
MF	(Argentina) Gonzalo Aguirre	(Argentina) Nueva Chicago	Loan return	30 June 2025	
FW	(Peru) Bassco Soyer	(Portugal) Gil Vicente U23	Undisclosed	22 July 2025	
MF	(Peru) Jhamir D'Arrigo	(Peru) Melgar	Undisclosed	9 August 2025	
MF	(Peru) Javier Navea	(Denmark) Vendsyssel FF	Undisclosed	15 August 2025	

== Friendlies ==
=== Pre-season ===
12 January 2025 Friendly	Alianza Lima (Peru)	2–0	(Ecuador) Emelec

15 January 2025 Friendly	Vélez Sársfield (Argentina)	1–1	(Peru) Alianza Lima

15 January 2025 Friendly	Vélez Sársfield (Argentina)	0–1	(Peru) Alianza Lima
			Aguirre 25'

21 January 2025 Friendly	Deportivo Morón (Argentina)	2–1	(Peru) Alianza Lima

25 January 2025 Friendly	LDU Quito (Ecuador)	1–1	(Peru) Alianza Lima

== Competitions ==
=== Liga 1 ===
==== Apertura ====
Pos	Team	Pld	W	D	L	GF	GA	GD	Pts	Qualification
1	Universitario	18	12	3	3	38	12	+26	39	Advance to the Playoffs
2	Alianza Lima	18	11	4	3	23	11	+12	37	
3	Cusco	18	10	4	4	34	20	+14	34	
4	Alianza Atlético	18	11	1	6	28	18	+10	34	
5	Sporting Cristal	18	10	2	6	31	24	+7	32	

Source: Liga 1, Soccerway
Rules for classification: 1) Points; 2) Goal difference; 3) Goals for; 4) Fair play points; 5) Drawing of lots.

==== Results by round ====
Round	1	2	3	4	5	6	7	8	9	10	11	12	13	14	15	16	17	18
Ground	H	A	H	A	H	A	H	A	H	A	H	A	H	A	H		A	H
Result	W	L	W	W	W	L	D	W	W	W	L	D	W	W	D	B	W	W
Position	1	8	6	4	3	4	4	4	4	2	2	3	2	2	2	3	2	

Updated to match(es) played on 5 July 2025. Source:
A = Away; H = Home; W = Win; D = Draw; L = Loss

==== Matches ====
9 February 2025 1	Alianza Lima	3–0	Cusco	Lima
				Stadium: Alejandro Villanueva Stadium

15 February 2025 2	Alianza Atlético	3–1	Alianza Lima	Trujillo
15:30				Stadium: Estadio Mansiche

22 February 2025 3	Alianza Lima	1–0	ADC Juan Pablo II College	Lima
				Stadium: Alejandro Villanueva Stadium

2 March 2025 4	Sporting Cristal	1–2	Alianza Lima	Lima
20:00				Stadium: National Stadium of Peru

8 March 2025 5	Alianza Lima	2–0	Ayacucho	Lima
				Stadium: Alejandro Villanueva Stadium

29 March 2025 6	ADT	3–0	Alianza Lima	Tarma
13:00 UTC−5				Stadium: Estadio Unión Tarma

5 April 2025 7	Alianza Lima	1–1	Universitario	Lima
19:00 UTC−5				Stadium: Alejandro Villanueva Stadium

14 April 2025 8	Deportivo Garcilaso	0–1	Alianza Lima	Cusco
19:30 UTC−5			Guerrero 52'	Stadium: Estadio Garcilaso

18 April 2025 9	Alianza Lima	1–0	Los Chankas	Lima
20:00	Barcos (yellow card) 45+2' (yellow-red card) 70', (goal) 68' (pen.)			Stadium: Alejandro Villanueva Stadium

2 May 2025 11	Alianza Lima	0–1	Cienciano	Lima
19:30				Stadium: Alejandro Villanueva Stadium

10 May 2025 12	Atlético Grau	1–1	Alianza Lima

20 May 2025 13	Alianza Lima	2–0	Alianza Universidad

26 April 2025 10	Comerciantes Unidos	v	Alianza Lima	Cajabamba
				Stadium: Estadio Germán Contreras Jara

=== Copa Libertadores ===
==== Qualifying stages ====
===== First stage =====
5 February 2025 First leg	Nacional (Paraguay)	1–1	(Peru) Alianza Lima	Asunción, Paraguay
21:30 UTC−3	Caballero 7'	Report	Barcos 90+9' (pen.)	Stadium: Estadio Arsenio Erico; Attendance: 1,405; Referee: Jhon Ospina (Colombia)

12 February 2025 Second leg	Alianza Lima (Peru)	3–1 (4–2 agg.)	(Paraguay) Nacional	Lima
19:30 UTC−5	Quevedo 11', 55'; Barcos 50'	Report	Gaona 15'	Stadium: Alejandro Villanueva Stadium; Attendance: 23,401; Referee: Piero Maza (Chile)

===== Second stage =====
18 February 2025 First leg	Alianza Lima (Peru)	1–0	(Argentina) Boca Juniors	Lima
19:30 UTC−3	Ceppelini 4'	Report		Stadium: Alejandro Villanueva Stadium; Attendance: 27,869; Referee: Esteban Ostojich (Uruguay)

25 February 2025 Second leg	Boca Juniors (Argentina)	2–1 (2–2 agg.) (4–5 p)	(Peru) Alianza Lima	Buenos Aires, Argentina
21:30 UTC−3	Trauco 5' (o.g.); Zenón 58'	Report	Barcos 19'	Stadium: La Bombonera; Attendance: 28,099; Referee: Piero Maza (Chile)
	Penalties
	Rojo (penalty scored); Cavani (penalty scored); Alarcón (penalty scored); Giménez (penalty scored); Velasco (penalty missed)		(penalty scored) Guerrero; (penalty scored) Gaibor; (penalty scored) Trauco; (penalty scored) Noriega; (penalty scored) Lavandeira

===== Third stage =====
4 March 2025 First leg	Deportes Iquique (Chile)	1–2	(Peru) Alianza Lima	Iquique, Chile
19:00 UTC−3	Zambrano 66' (o.g.)	Report	Barcos 31'; E. Castillo 34'	Stadium: Estadio Tierra de Campeones; Attendance: 10,446; Referee: Flavio de Souza (Brazil)

11 March 2025 Second leg	Alianza Lima (Peru)	1–1 (3–2 agg.)	(Chile) Deportes Iquique	Lima
17:00 UTC−5	Quevedo 42'	Report	Dávila 90'	Stadium: Alejandro Villanueva Stadium; Attendance: 27,007; Referee: Yael Falcón Pérez (Argentina)

==== Group stage ====
Pos	Team	Pld	W	D	L	GF	GA	GD	Pts	Qualification
1	(Brazil) São Paulo	6	4	2	0	10	4	+6	14	Advance to round of 16
2	(Paraguay) Libertad	6	2	3	1	6	5	+1	9	Advance to round of 16
3	(Peru) Alianza Lima	6	1	2	3	7	11	−4	5	Transfer to Copa Sudamericana
4	(Argentina) Talleres	6	1	1	4	5	8	−3	4	

Source: CONMEBOL
Rules for classification: 1) Points; 2) Goal difference; 3) Goals scored; 4) Away goals scored; 5) CONMEBOL ranking.

1 April 2025 1	Alianza Lima (Peru)	0–1	(Paraguay) Libertad	Lima
21:00 UTC−5	Enrique (yellow card) 17' (yellow-red card) 90+6'	Report	Aguilar 52'; Martínez (red card) 68'	Stadium: Alejandro Villanueva Stadium; Attendance: 25,376; Referee: Wilmar Roldán (Colombia)

10 April 2025 2	São Paulo (Brazil)	2–2	(Peru) Allianza Lima	São Paulo, Brazil
21:30 UTC−3	Ferreira 32', 37'	Report	Castillo 66'; Quevedo 76'	Stadium: Estádio do Morumbi; Attendance: 49,938; Referee: Alexis Herrera (Venezuela)

22 April 2025 3	Alianza Lima (Peru)	3–2	(Argentina) Talleres	Lima
17:00 UTC−5	Guerrero 11', 57'; Zambrano (yellow card) 72' (yellow-red card) 82'; Barcos 90+5'	Report	Girotti 64' (pen.), 69'	Stadium: Estadio Alejandro Villanueva; Attendance: 24,553; Referee: Andrés Rojas (Colombia)

6 May 2025 4	Alianza Lima (Peru)	0–2	(Brazil) São Paulo	Lima
17:00		Report	André Silva 35', 89'	Stadium: Estadio Alejandro Villanueva; Attendance: 25,208

15 May 2025 5	Talleres (Argentina)	2–0	(Peru) Alianza Lima	Córdoba, Argentina
19:00 UTC−3	Botta 23'; Depietri 38'	Report		Stadium: Estadio Mario Alberto Kempes; Attendance: 25,046; Referee: Gery Vargas (Bolivia)

27 May 2025 6	Libertad (Paraguay)	2–2	(Peru) Alianza Lima	Asunción, Paraguay
19:30 UTC−3	Ó. Cardozo 45+5' (pen.); Ramírez 63'	Report	Guerrero 28'; E. Castillo 42'	Stadium: Estadio La Huerta; Attendance: 2,567

=== Copa Sudamericana ===
==== Knockout round play-offs ====
16 July 2025 First leg	Alianza Lima (Peru)	2–0	(Brazil) Grêmio	Lima
19:30 UTC−5	Gentile 58'; E. Castillo 61'	Report		Stadium: Estadio Alejandro Villanueva; Attendance: 23,320; Referee: Wilmar Roldán (Colombia)

23 July 2025 Second leg	Grêmio (Brazil)	1–1 (1–3 agg.)	(Peru) Alianza Lima	Porto Alegre, Brazil
21:30 UTC−3	Gustavo Martins 56'	Report	Barcos 90+6'	Stadium: Arena do Grêmio; Referee: Darío Herrera (Argentina)

==== Round of 16 ====
13 August 2025 First leg	Alianza Lima (Peru)	2–0	(Ecuador) Universidad Católica	Lima
19:30 UTC−5	Cantero 76', 87'	Report		Stadium: Estadio Alejandro Villanueva; Attendance: 26,351; Referee: Leandro Rey Hilfer (Argentina)

20 August 2025 Second leg	Universidad Católica (Ecuador)	1–2 (1–4 agg.)	(Peru) Alianza Lima	Quito, Ecuador
19:30 UTC−5	Londoño 18'	Report	E. Castillo 39'; Quevedo 81'	Stadium: Estadio Olímpico Atahualpa; Referee: Flavio de Souza (Brazil)

==== Quarter-finals ====
18 September 2025 First leg	Alianza Lima (Peru)	0–0	Universidad de Chile	Lima, Peru
19:30 UTC−5		Report		Stadium: Estadio Alejandro Villanueva; Referee: Ramon Abatti (Brazil)

25 September 2025 Second leg	Universidad de Chile	2–1	(Peru) Alianza Lima	Coquimbo, Chile
21:30 UTC−3				Stadium: Estadio Municipal Francisco Sánchez Rumoroso (Note: Universidad de Chile will play their quarter-final home match at Estadio Municipal Francisco Sánchez Rumoroso, Coquimbo instead of their regular stadium Estadio Nacional Julio Martínez Prádanos, Santiago which will be reserved for the 2025 FIFA U-20 World Cup.); Attendance: 0
