= 2025 Club Atlético Boca Juniors season =

Boca Juniors
2025 season
- President: Juan Román Riquelme
- Manager: Fernando Gago (until April 29); Mariano Herrón (interim, from April 30 to May 20); Miguel Ángel Russo (from June 2 to October 8); Claudio Úbeda (from October 9)
- Stadium: Estadio Alberto J. Armando
- Torneo Apertura: Quarter-finals
- Torneo Clausura: Semifinals
- Copa Argentina: Round of 32
- Copa Libertadores: Second stage
- Club World Cup: Group stage
- Top goalscorer: League: Miguel Merentiel (11 goals); All: Miguel Merentiel (13 goals)
- Average home league attendance: 52,478
Home colours	Away colours	Third colours

The 2025 Club Atlético Boca Juniors season is the 97th consecutive season in the top flight of Argentine football. In addition to the domestic league; divided in two tournaments, Boca Juniors are participating in this season's editions of the Copa Argentina, Copa Libertadores and Club World Cup.

== Season overview ==
=== January ===
Bruno Valdez, Gonzalo Maroni, Gonzalo Morales, Nicolás Orsini, Simón Rivero, Gabriel Aranda, Esteban Rolón, Nazareno Solís and Renzo Giampaoli returned from their respective loans. Carlos Palacios is transferred from Colo-Colo. Guillermo Fernández ended his contract with the club and subsequently joined Fortaleza. Nicolás Valentini ended his contract with the club and subsequently joined Fiorentina. Aaron Anselmino is recalled from his loan spell and returns to Chelsea. Gonzalo Morales is loaned to Barracas Central. Boca and Gary Medel agreed to mutually terminate the midfielder's contract. Nazareno Solís is loaned to Deportivo Madryn and Gabriel Aranda is loaned to Quilmes. Renzo Giampaoli is loaned to Gimnasia y Esgrima (LP). Cristian Medina is transferred to Estudiantes (LP). Ayrton Costa arrives from Royal Antwerp, Ander Herrera arrives from Athletic Bilbao, Rodrigo Battaglia arrives from Atlético Mineiro, Alan Velasco arrives from FC Dallas, Williams Alarcón arrives from Huracán and Agustín Marchesín arrives from Grêmio. Gonzalo Maroni is loaned to Newell's Old Boys. Jabes Saralegui is loaned to Tigre. Bruno Valdez is loaned again to Cerro Porteño. The first match of the season is a 5–0 win over Argentino (MM) in Copa Argentina. On 26 January, Boca drew 0–0 against Argentinos Juniors. On 29 January, Boca drew 1–1 against Unión.

=== February ===
Boca and Jan Carlos Hurtado agreed to mutually terminate the forward's contract. Juan Ramírez was loaned to Lanús. Mauricio Benítez was loaned to Royal Antwerp. On 2 February, Boca defeated Huracán 2–1. On 8 February, Boca lost 0–2 against Racing. On 11 February, Boca defeated Independiente Rivadavia 2–0. On 14 February, Boca defeated Banfield 1–0. In the first match of 2025 Copa Libertadores Boca lost 0–1 against Alianza Lima in Peru. On 22 February, Boca defeated Aldosivi 2–1. On 25 February, Boca won 2–1 in the second leg against Alianza Lima, but lost on penalties, being eliminated from the 2025 Copa Libertadores. On 28 February, Boca defeated Rosario Central 1–0.

=== March ===
On march 7, Boca defeated Central Córdoba (SdE) 3–0. Nicolás Orsini is loaned to Platense. On march 16, Boca defeated Defensa y Justicia 4–0. On march 30, Boca lost 0–2 against Newell's Old Boys.

=== April ===
On April 6, Boca defeated Barracas Central 1–0. On April 12, Boca defeated Belgrano 3-1. On April 19, Boca defeated Estudiantes (LP) 2–0. On April 27, Boca lost the Superclásico 1-2. On April 29, Fernando Gago is sacked and Mariano Herrón is appointed as interim manager.

=== May ===
On may 4, Boca drew 1–1 against Tigre. On may 10, Boca advanced to the quarterfinals of Torneo Apertura after defeating Lanús 4-2 on penalties. On may 19 Boca is eliminated from Torneo Apertura after a 0-1 defeat against Independiente. Miguel Ángel Russo is appointed as new manager; being the third time at the club, after 2006-2007 and 2020-2021.

=== June ===
Malcom Braida arrives from San Lorenzo and Marco Pellegrino arrives from AC Milan. In the first match of 2025 FIFA Club World Cup Boca drew 2-2 against Benfica. On the second match Boca lost 1-2 against German powerhouse Bayern Munich. On the third match Boca drew 1-1 against Auckland City, being eliminated in the group stage. Jorman Campuzano returns from Atletico Nacional.

=== July ===
World champion Leandro Paredes returns to the club from Roma after eleven years. Simón Rivero is loaned to Tigre. On july 13, Boca drew 0–0 against Argentinos Juniors. Jorman Campuzano is transferred to Atletico Nacional. On july 18, Boca drew 1-1 against Unión. On july 23 Boca lost 1-2 against Atlético Tucumán in the Round of 16 of Copa Argentina. Boca and Esteban Rolón agreed to mutually terminate the midfielder's contract. On july 27 Boca lost 0-1 against Huracán.

=== August ===
Boca and Marcos Rojo agreed to mutually terminate the defender's contract. On august 9, Boca drew 1-1 against Racing. On august 17, Boca defeated Independiente Rivadavia 3–0. On august 24, Boca defeated Banfield 2–0. Marcelo Saracchi is loaned to Celtic. On august 31, Boca defeated Aldosivi 2–0. Vicente Taborda, who was on loan to Platense, is transferred to Panathinaikos.

=== September ===
On september 14, Boca drew 1-1 against Rosario Central. On september 14, Boca drew 2-2 against Central Córdoba (SdE). On september 27 Boca lost 1-2 against Defensa y Justicia.

=== October ===
On october 5, Boca defeated Newell's Old Boys 5–0. On october 8 manager Miguel Ángel Russo passed away and the match against Barracas Central was postponed. Boca and Sergio Romero agreed to mutually terminate the goalkeeper's contract. On october 18 Boca lost 1-2 against Belgrano. On october 27 Boca defeated Barracas Central 3–1.

=== November ===
On november 2 Boca defeated Estudiantes (LP) 2–1. On 9 November, Boca won the Superclásico against River Plate 2–0. On november 16 Boca defeated Tigre 2–0. On november 23 Boca defeated Talleres (C) 2–0 and advanced to the quarterfinals of Torneo Clausura. On november 30 Boca defeated Argentinos Juniors 1–0 and advanced to the semifinals of Torneo Clausura.

=== December ===
On december 7 Boca is eliminated from Torneo Clausura after a 0-1 defeat against Racing.

== Current squad ==
Last updated on December 8, 2025.

Squad no.	Name	Nationality	Position	Date of birth (age)	Apps	Goals	Last team	Note
Goalkeepers
12	Leandro Brey	(Argentina)	GK	21 September 2002 (age 24)	28	-17	(Argentina) Los Andes	
13	Javier García	(Argentina)	GK	29 January 1987 (age 39)	74	-90	(Argentina) Racing	
25	Agustín Marchesín (VC 3º)	(Argentina)	GK	16 March 1988 (age 38)	40	-32	(Brazil) Grêmio	
Defenders
2	Cristian Lema	(Argentina)	DF	24 March 1990 (age 36)	34	1	(Argentina) Lanús	
4	Nicolás Figal	(Argentina)	DF	3 April 1994 (age 32)	109	5	(United States) Inter Miami	
17	Luis Advíncula	(Peru)	DF	2 March 1990 (age 36)	169	6	(Spain) Rayo Vallecano	
18	Frank Fabra	(Colombia)	DF	22 February 1991 (age 35)	244	15	(Colombia) Independiente Medellín	
23	Lautaro Blanco	(Argentina)	DF	19 September 1999 (age 27)	83	1	(Spain) Elche	
24	Juan Barinaga	(Argentina)	DF	10 October 2000 (age 26)	32	0	(Argentina) Belgrano	
26	Marco Pellegrino	(Argentina)	DF	18 July 2002 (age 24)	8	0	(Italy) AC Milan	
32	Ayrton Costa	(Argentina)	DF	12 June 1999 (age 27)	26	3	(Belgium) Royal Antwerp	
34	Mateo Mendía	(Argentina)	DF	3 February 2004 (age 22)	7	0	(Argentina) Youth team	
40	Lautaro Di Lollo	(Argentina)	DF	10 March 2004 (age 22)	52	3	(Argentina) Youth team	
42	Lucas Blondel	(Switzerland)	DF	14 September 1996 (age 30)	31	4	(Argentina) Tigre	
Midfielders
5	Leandro Paredes (VC 2º)	(Argentina)	MF	29 June 1994 (age 32)	49	6	(Italy) Roma	
6	Rodrigo Battaglia	(Argentina)	MF	12 July 1991 (age 35)	35	5	(Brazil) Atlético Mineiro	
8	Carlos Palacios	(Chile)	MF	19 July 2000 (age 26)	36	3	(Chile) Colo-Colo	
14	Ignacio Miramón	(Argentina)	MF	12 June 2003 (age 23)	19	0	(France) Lille	
15	Williams Alarcón	(Chile)	MF	29 November 2000 (age 25)	26	0	(Argentina) Huracán	
19	Agustín Martegani	(Argentina)	MF	20 May 2000 (age 26)	13	0	(Argentina) San Lorenzo	
21	Ander Herrera (VC 4º)	(Spain)	MF	14 August 1989 (age 37)	17	0	(Spain) Athletic Bilbao	
22	Kevin Zenón	(Argentina)	MF	30 July 2001 (age 25)	79	10	(Argentina) Unión	
27	Malcom Braida	(Argentina)	MF	17 May 1997 (age 29)	8	0	(Argentina) San Lorenzo	
30	Tomás Belmonte	(Argentina)	MF	27 May 1998 (age 28)	43	1	(Mexico) Toluca	
38	Camilo Rey Domenech	(Argentina)	MF	10 March 2006 (age 20)	7	0	(Argentina) Youth team	
43	Milton Delgado	(Argentina)	MF	16 June 2005 (age 21)	41	0	(Argentina) Youth team	
51	Santiago Dalmasso	(Argentina)	MF	18 June 2004 (age 22)	3	0	(Argentina) Youth team	
Forwards
7	Exequiel Zeballos	(Argentina)	FW	24 April 2002 (age 24)	127	15	(Argentina) Youth team	
9	Milton Giménez	(Argentina)	FW	12 August 1996 (age 30)	59	17	(Argentina) Banfield	
10	Edinson Cavani (C)	(Uruguay)	FW	14 February 1987 (age 39)	79	28	(Spain) Valencia	
11	Lucas Janson	(Argentina)	FW	16 August 1994 (age 32)	47	3	(Argentina) Vélez Sarsfield	
16	Miguel Merentiel (VC 3º)	(Uruguay)	FW	24 February 1996 (age 30)	143	50	(Brazil) Palmeiras	
20	Alan Velasco	(Argentina)	FW	27 July 2002 (age 24)	31	1	(United States) FC Dallas	
33	Brian Aguirre	(Argentina)	FW	6 January 2003 (age 23)	37	4	(Argentina) Newell's Old Boys	
53	Joaquín Ruiz	(Argentina)	MF	21 July 2006 (age 20)	3	0	(Argentina) Youth team	

== Transfers ==
=== Summer ===
==== In ====
Players transferred
Pos.	Name	Club	Fee
GK	(Argentina) Agustín Marchesín	(Brazil) Grêmio	Undisclosed
DF	(Argentina) Ayrton Costa	(Belgium) Royal Antwerp	Undisclosed
MF	(Chile) Williams Alarcón	(Argentina) Huracán	Undisclosed
MF	(Argentina) Rodrigo Battaglia	(Brazil) Atlético Mineiro	Undisclosed
MF	(Spain) Ander Herrera	(Spain) Athletic Bilbao	Free
FW	(Chile) Carlos Palacios	(Chile) Colo-Colo	Undisclosed
FW	(Argentina) Alan Velasco	(United States) FC Dallas	Undisclosed

Players loaned
Pos.	Name	Club	End date

Loan Return
Pos.	Name	Return from
DF	(Argentina) Gabriel Aranda	(Argentina) Banfield
DF	(Argentina) Renzo Giampaoli	(Uruguay) Defensor Sporting
DF	(Paraguay) Bruno Valdez	(Paraguay) Cerro Porteño
MF	(Argentina) Gonzalo Maroni	(Argentina) San Lorenzo
MF	(Argentina) Simón Rivero	(Argentina) Unión
MF	(Argentina) Esteban Rolón	(Argentina) Belgrano
FW	(Argentina) Gonzalo Morales	(Argentina) Unión
FW	(Argentina) Nicolás Orsini	(Argentina) Unión
FW	(Argentina) Nazareno Solís	(Argentina) Gimnasia y Esgrima (M)

==== Out ====
Players transferred
Pos.	Name	Club	Fee
DF	(Argentina) Nicolás Valentini	(Italy) Fiorentina	Free
MF	(Argentina) Guillermo Fernández	(Brazil) Fortaleza	Free
MF	(Chile) Gary Medel	(Chile) Universidad Católica	Free
MF	(Argentina) Cristian Medina	(Argentina) Estudiantes (LP)	15.000.000
FW	(Venezuela) Jan Carlos Hurtado	(Argentina) Gimnasia y Esgrima (LP)	Free

Players loaned
Pos.	Name	Club	End date
DF	(Argentina) Gabriel Aranda	(Argentina) Quilmes	December 2025
DF	(Argentina) Renzo Giampaoli	(Argentina) Gimnasia y Esgrima (LP)	December 2025
DF	(Paraguay) Bruno Valdez	(Paraguay) Cerro Porteño	December 2025
MF	(Argentina) Mauricio Benítez	(Belgium) Royal Antwerp	June 2026
MF	(Argentina) Gonzalo Maroni	(Argentina) Newell's Old Boys	December 2025
MF	(Argentina) Juan Ramírez	(Argentina) Lanús	December 2025
MF	(Argentina) Jabes Saralegui	(Argentina) Tigre	December 2025
FW	(Argentina) Gonzalo Morales	(Argentina) Barracas Central	December 2025
FW	(Argentina) Nicolás Orsini	(Argentina) Platense	December 2025
FW	(Argentina) Nazareno Solís	(Argentina) Deportivo Madryn	December 2026

Loan return
Pos.	Name	Return to
DF	(Argentina) Aaron Anselmino	(England) Chelsea

=== Winter ===
==== In ====
Players transferred
Pos.	Name	Club	Fee
DF	(Argentina) Marco Pellegrino	(Italy) AC Milan	Undisclosed
MF	(Argentina) Malcom Braida	(Argentina) San Lorenzo	Undisclosed
MF	(Argentina) Leandro Paredes	(Italy) Roma	Undisclosed

Players loaned
Pos.	Name	Club	End date

Loan Return
Pos.	Name	Return from
MF	(Colombia) Jorman Campuzano	(Colombia) Atletico Nacional

==== Out ====
Players transferred
Pos.	Name	Club	Fee
GK	(Argentina) Sergio Romero	(Argentina) Argentinos Juniors	Free
MF	(Argentina) Marcos Rojo	(Argentina) Racing	Free
MF	(Colombia) Jorman Campuzano	(Colombia) Atletico Nacional	Undisclosed
FW	(Argentina) Vicente Taborda	(Greece) Panathinaikos	Undisclosed

Players loaned
Pos.	Name	Club	End date
DF	(Uruguay) Marcelo Saracchi	(Scotland) Celtic	June 2026
MF	(Argentina) Simón Rivero	(Argentina) Tigre	December 2026

Loan return
Pos.	Name	Return to

== Competitions ==
=== Overall ===
Competition	First match	Last match	Starting round	Final position	Record							
Competition	First match	Last match	Starting round	Final position	Pld	W	D	L	GF	GA	GD	Win %
Torneo Apertura	26 January 2025	19 May 2025	Matchday 1	Quarterfinals	18	10	4	4	24	12	+12	55.56
Torneo Clausura	13 July 2025	7 December 2025	Matchday 1	Semifinals	19	10	5	4	31	13	+18	52.63
Copa Argentina	22 January 2025	23 July 2025	Round of 64	Round of 32	2	1	0	1	6	2	+4	50.00
Copa Libertadores	18 February 2025	25 February 2025	Second stage	Second stage	2	1	0	1	2	2	+0	50.00
Club World Cup	16 June 2025	24 June 2025	Group stage	Group stage	3	0	2	1	4	5	−1	0.00
Total					44	22	11	11	67	34	+33	50.00

Last updated: December 8, 2025
Source: Competitions

=== Primera División ===
==== Torneo Apertura ====
===== Group stage =====
====== Zone A ======
Pos	Team	Pld	W	D	L	GF	GA	GD	Pts	Qualification
1	Argentinos Juniors	16	9	6	1	24	9	+15	33	Advance to round of 16
2	Boca Juniors	16	10	3	3	24	11	+13	33	Advance to round of 16
3	Racing	16	9	1	6	26	16	+10	28	Advance to round of 16
4	Huracán	16	7	6	3	19	12	+7	27	Advance to round of 16
5	Tigre	16	8	3	5	18	12	+6	27	Advance to round of 16

Source: AFA

===== Results summary =====
Overall								Home						Away					
Pld	W	D	L	GF	GA	GD	Pts	W	D	L	GF	GA	GD	W	D	L	GF	GA	GD
16	10	3	3	24	11	+13	33	7	1	0	14	2	+12	3	2	3	10	9	+1

Source: AFA

===== Results by round =====
Round	1	2	3	4	5	6	7	8	9	10	11	12	13	14	15	16
Ground	H	A	H	A	H	A	H	H	A	H	A	H	A	H	A	A
Result	D	D	W	L	W	W	W	W	W	W	L	W	W	W	L	D
Position	9	9	9	11	9	6	4	4	3	1	2	1	1	1	1	2

Source: AFA
A = Away; H = Home; W = Win; D = Draw; L = Loss

===== Matches =====
Win Draw Loss Postponed

26 January 2025 1	Boca Juniors	0–0	Argentinos Juniors	Buenos Aires
19:00 UTC−3	Fabra (yellow card) 73'	Report	Fattori (yellow card) 60'; Prieto (yellow card) 67'	Stadium: La Bombonera; Referee: Pablo Dóvalo

29 January 2025 2	Unión	1–1	Boca Juniors	Santa Fe
19:15 UTC−3	M. Pittón (yellow card) 18'; B. Pittón (yellow card) 34'; Palacios (yellow card) 62'; Fragapane 90+1'; Colazo (yellow card) 90+3'	Report	Saracchi 4'; Zeballos (yellow card) 39'; Battaglia (yellow card) 45+1'; Barinaga (yellow card) 79'	Stadium: 15 de Abril; Referee: Pablo Echavarría

2 February 2025 3	Boca Juniors	2–1	Huracán	Buenos Aires
19:15 UTC−3	Saracchi (yellow card) 8'; Cavani 18'; Alarcón (yellow card) 38'; Palacios 67'	Report	Pellegrino 30'; Miljevic (yellow card) 35'; Guidara (yellow card) 36'; Pérez (yellow card) 49'; Sequeira (yellow card) 70'	Stadium: La Bombonera; Referee: Silvio Trucco

8 February 2025 4	Racing	2–0	Boca Juniors	Avellaneda
22:15 UTC−3	Vietto 15'; Martirena (yellow card) 34'; Nardoni (yellow card) 45+3'; Martínez (yellow card) 53' (goal) 86'; Mura (yellow card) 71'; Solari (yellow card) 83'	Report	Cavani (yellow card) 16'; Costa (yellow card) 36'; Barinaga (yellow card) 47'; Belmonte (yellow card) 83'; Zenón (red card) 88'; Marchesín (yellow card) 89'; Alarcón (yellow card) 90+7'	Stadium: Presidente Juan Domingo Perón; Referee: Yael Falcón Pérez

11 February 2025 5	Boca Juniors	2–0	Independiente Rivadavia	Buenos Aires
20:00 UTC−3	Costa (yellow card) 14'; Velasco (yellow card) 49'; Merentiel 51'; Di Lollo (yellow card) 59'; Alarcón (yellow card) 80'; Zeballos 83'	Report	Villalba (yellow card) 59'; Fernández (yellow card) 90+1'	Stadium: La Bombonera; Referee: Facundo Tello

14 February 2025 6	Banfield	0–1	Boca Juniors	Banfield
20:00 UTC−3		Report	Blanco (yellow card) 49'; Costa (yellow card) 76' (yellow-red card) 88'; Di Lollo 86'	Stadium: Florencio Solá; Referee: Pablo Dóvalo

22 February 2025 7	Boca Juniors	2–1	Aldosivi	Buenos Aires
19:30 UTC−3	Herrera (yellow card) 31'; Advíncula 49'; Blanco (yellow card) 65'; Merentiel 84' (yellow card) 90+1'; Zenón (yellow card) 89'	Report	Cerato (yellow card) 43'; Serrago 63'	Stadium: La Bombonera; Referee: Leandro Rey Hilfer

28 February 2025 8	Boca Juniors	1–0	Rosario Central	Buenos Aires
20:00 UTC−3	Giménez 8'; Blondel (yellow card) 10'; Di Lollo (yellow card) 40'	Report	Campaz (yellow card) 45'; Broun (yellow card) 76'; Malcorra (yellow card) 84'	Stadium: La Bombonera; Referee: Hernán Mastrángelo

7 March 2025 9	Central Córdoba (SdE)	0–3	Boca Juniors	Santiago del Estero
21:15 UTC−3	Verón (yellow card) 41'; Galván (red card) 45+9'; Perelló (yellow card) 65'	Report	Giménez 16'; Florentín 36' (o.g.); Delgado (yellow card) 45+6'; Merentiel 89'	Stadium: Único Madre de Ciudades; Referee: Yael Falcón Pérez

16 March 2025 10	Boca Juniors	4–0	Defensa y Justicia	Buenos Aires
18:30 UTC−3	Cavani 9'; Giménez 32', 50' (yellow card) 34'; Belmonte (yellow card) 72'; Merentiel 81'; Rojo (yellow card) 88'	Report	Schamine (yellow card) 67'; Miritello (yellow card) 88'	Stadium: La Bombonera; Referee: Pablo Dóvalo

30 March 2025 11	Newell's Old Boys	2–0	Boca Juniors	Rosario
19:30 UTC−3	Herrera 4'; Lollo 45+2'; Martino (yellow card) 51'; Montero (yellow card) 78'; Banega (yellow card) 81'	Report	Di Lollo (yellow card) 24'; Cavani (penalty missed) 53'	Stadium: Marcelo Bielsa; Referee: Darío Herrera

6 April 2025 12	Boca Juniors	1–0	Barracas Central	Buenos Aires
18:00 UTC−3	Giménez (yellow card) 31'; Battaglia 39'; Rojo (yellow card) 77'	Report	Insúa (yellow card) 42'	Stadium: La Bombonera; Referee: Fernando Echenique

12 April 2025 13	Belgrano	1–3	Boca Juniors	Córdoba
20:30 UTC−3	Menossi 59'; Grillo (yellow card) 90'	Report	Rojo 37'; Zenón 60'; Palacios 75'; Battaglia (yellow card) 87'	Stadium: Julio César Villagra; Referee: Hernán Mastrángelo

19 April 2025 14	Boca Juniors	2–0	Estudiantes (LP)	Buenos Aires
20:30 UTC−3	Advíncula (yellow card) 19'; Cavani (penalty missed) 40'; Palacios (yellow card) 41' (goal) 48'; Blanco (yellow card) 50'; Merentiel 63'; Miramón (yellow card) 90+2'; Marchesín (yellow card) 90+3'	Report	Arzamendia (yellow card) 26'; Mansilla (yellow card) 51'; Ascacíbar (yellow card) 90+2'	Stadium: La Bombonera; Referee: Nazareno Arasa

27 April 2025 15	River Plate	2–1	Boca Juniors	Buenos Aires
15:30 UTC−3	Mastantuono 26' (yellow card) 90+2'; Driussi 45'; Borja (yellow card) 45+1'; Acuña (yellow card) 45+1'; Meza (yellow card) 55'; Martínez Quarta (yellow card) 74'; Castaño (yellow card) 90+4'	Report	Belmonte (yellow card) 12'; Costa (yellow card) 19'; Rojo (yellow card) 23'; Merentiel 39'; Advíncula (yellow card) 62'; Battaglia (yellow card) 85'	Stadium: Monumental Antonio Vespucio Liberti; Referee: Nicolás Ramírez

4 May 2025 16	Tigre	1–1	Boca Juniors	Victoria
18:00 UTC−3	Moreno (yellow card) 3'; Scipioni (yellow card) 16' (goal) 45+2'; Palacios (yellow card) 62'	Report	Zenón 20'; Velasco (yellow card) 23'; Battaglia (yellow card) 29'; Delgado (yellow card) 90+1'	Stadium: José Dellagiovanna; Referee: Facundo Tello

===== Final stages =====
10 May 2025 Round of 16	Boca Juniors	0–0 (4–2 p)	Lanús	Buenos Aires
20:30 UTC−3	Delgado (yellow card) 57'; Rojo (yellow card) 61'	Report	Medina (yellow card) 21'; Méndez (yellow card) 42'; Dejesús (yellow card) 62'	Stadium: La Bombonera; Referee: Leandro Rey Hilfer
	Penalties
	Rojo (penalty scored); Zeballos (penalty scored); Alarcón (penalty scored); Giménez (penalty scored)		(penalty missed) Canelo; (penalty scored) Moreno; (penalty missed) Aquino; (penalty scored) Carrera

19 May 2025 Quarter-finals	Boca Juniors	0–1	Independiente	Buenos Aires
21:30 UTC−3	Costa (yellow card) 47'; Zenón (yellow card) 68'; Battaglia (yellow card) 80'	Report	Vera (yellow card) 46'; Angulo 63'; Giménez (yellow card) 85'; Galdames (yellow card) 85'; Rey (yellow card) 87'	Stadium: La Bombonera; Referee: Nicolás Ramírez

==== Torneo Clausura ====
===== League table =====
====== Zone A ======
Pos	Team	Pld	W	D	L	GF	GA	GD	Pts	Qualification
1	Boca Juniors	16	8	5	3	28	12	+16	29	Advance to round of 16
2	Unión	16	6	7	3	20	13	+7	25	Advance to round of 16
3	Racing	16	7	4	5	16	13	+3	25	Advance to round of 16
4	Central Córdoba (SdE)	16	5	9	2	17	11	+6	24	Advance to round of 16
5	Argentinos Juniors	16	7	3	6	18	13	+5	24	Advance to round of 16

Source: AFA
Rules for classification: 1) points; 2) goal difference; 3) goals scored; 4) fair play ranking 5) drawing of lots.

===== International qualification =====
Pos	Team	Pld	W	D	L	GF	GA	GD	Pts	Qualification or relegation
1	Rosario Central (Q)	32	18	12	2	40	16	+24	66	Qualification for Copa Libertadores group stage
2	Boca Juniors (Q)	32	18	8	6	52	23	+29	62	Qualification for Copa Libertadores group stage
3	Argentinos Juniors (T)	32	16	9	7	42	22	+20	57	Qualification for Copa Libertadores second stage
4	River Plate (X)	32	14	11	7	41	24	+17	53	Qualification for Copa Sudamericana group stage
5	Racing (X)	32	16	5	11	42	29	+13	53	Qualification for Copa Sudamericana group stage

Updated to match(es) played on 16 November 2025. Source: AFA
Rules for classification: 1) points; 2) goal difference; 3) goals scored; 4) head-to-head results 5) fair play ranking 6) drawing of lots.
(Q) Qualified for the phase indicated; (T) Qualified, but not yet for the particular phase indicated; (X) Assured of Copa Sudamericana, but may still qualify for Copa Libertadores

===== Relegation =====
Pos	Team	2023 Pts	2024 Pts	2025 Pts	Total Pts	Total Pld	Avg	Relegation
1	River Plate	85	70	53	208	114	1.825	
2	Boca Juniors	62	67	62	191	114	1.675	
3	Racing	60	70	53	183	114	1.605	

===== Results summary =====
Overall								Home						Away					
Pld	W	D	L	GF	GA	GD	Pts	W	D	L	GF	GA	GD	W	D	L	GF	GA	GD
16	8	5	3	28	12	+16	29	4	3	1	16	6	+10	4	2	2	12	6	+6

Source: AFA

===== Results by round =====
Round	1	2	3	4	5	6	7	8	9	10	11	12	13	14	15	16
Ground	A	H	A	H	A	H	A	A	H	A	H	A	H	A	H	H
Result	D	D	L	D	W	W	W	D	D	L	W	W	L	W	W	W
Position	8	11	13	14	10	5	3	3	3	6	1	4	3	1	1	1

Source: AFA
A = Away; H = Home; W = Win; D = Draw; L = Loss

===== Matches =====
Win Draw Loss Postponed

13 July 2025 1	Argentinos Juniors	0–0	Boca Juniors	Buenos Aires
18:45 UTC−3	Álvarez (yellow card) 14'; Godoy (yellow card) 38'; Lescano (yellow card) 83'	Report	Advíncula (yellow card) 13'; Braida (yellow card) 85'	Stadium: Diego Armando Maradona; Referee: Ariel Penel

18 July 2025 2	Boca Juniors	1–1	Unión	Buenos Aires
19:30 UTC−3	Di Lollo 84'	Report	Pardo (yellow card) 42'; Tarragona 63'; Fragapane (yellow card) 87'; Tagliamonte (yellow card) 90+4'	Stadium: La Bombonera; Referee: Nazareno Arasa

27 July 2025 3	Huracán	1–0	Boca Juniors	Buenos Aires
18:30 UTC−3	Ibáñez (yellow card) 40'; Miljevic 65'	Report	Paredes (yellow card) 29'; Velasco (yellow card) 31'; Giménez (yellow card) 49'; Pellegrino (yellow card) 55'; Cavani (yellow card) 69'	Stadium: Tomás Adolfo Ducó; Referee: Leandro Rey Hilfer

9 August 2025 4	Boca Juniors	1–1	Racing	Buenos Aires
16:30 UTC−3	Velasco (yellow card) 63'; Giménez 82' (yellow card) 89'	Report	García Basso (yellow card) 29'; Nardoni (yellow card) 43'; Martínez (yellow card) 45'; Solari 75'; Rojas (yellow card) 82'; Conechny (yellow card) 88'; Fernández (yellow card) 90+2'	Stadium: La Bombonera; Referee: Nicolás Ramírez

17 August 2025 5	Independiente Rivadavia	0–3	Boca Juniors	Mendoza
20:30 UTC−3	Souto (yellow card) 21'; Studer (yellow card) 90+3'	Report	Palacios (yellow card) 19'; Pellegrino (yellow card) 25'; Centurión 29' (o.g.); Velasco (yellow card) 83' (goal) 89'; Zeballos 87'	Stadium: Bautista Gargantini; Referee: Pablo Dóvalo

24 August 2025 6	Boca Juniors	2–0	Banfield	Buenos Aires
18:15 UTC−3	Di Lollo (yellow card) 46'; Merentiel 54'; Cavani 81'	Report		Stadium: La Bombonera; Referee: Nicolás Lamolina

31 August 2025 7	Aldosivi	0–2	Boca Juniors	Mar del Plata
14:30 UTC−3	Gino (yellow card) 37'; Leiva (yellow card) 73'; Cabral (yellow card) 76'	Report	Costa (yellow card) 41'; Di Lollo 45+1'; Paredes (yellow card) 76'; Battaglia 80'	Stadium: José María Minella; Referee: Sebastián Zunino

14 September 2025 8	Rosario Central	1–1	Boca Juniors	Rosario
17:30 UTC−3	Quintana (yellow card) 18'; Di María 24'; Malcorra (yellow card) 32'; Ibarra (yellow card) 90'	Report	Battaglia 20'; Cavani (yellow card) 32'; Di Lollo (yellow card) 83'; Alarcón (yellow card) 87'	Stadium: Gigante de Arroyito; Referee: Facundo Tello

21 September 2025 9	Boca Juniors	2–2	Central Córdoba (SdE)	Buenos Aires
16:45 UTC−3	Battaglia 41'; Merentiel 56'; Paredes (yellow card) 78'; Di Lollo (yellow card) 90+3'	Report	Godoy (yellow card) 29'; Florentín 62'; Gómez 83'; Alfonso (yellow card) 84'; Aguerre (yellow card) 87'; Verón (yellow card) 90+3'	Stadium: La Bombonera; Referee: Yael Falcón Pérez

27 September 2025 10	Defensa y Justicia	2–1	Boca Juniors	Florencio Varela
19:00 UTC−3	Ferreira (yellow card) 25'; Gutiérrez (yellow card) 39'; Osorio 83' (pen.), 90+3'	Report	Di Lollo (yellow card) 37'; Paredes 87' (pen.)	Stadium: Norberto Tomaghello; Referee: Jorge Baliño

5 October 2025 11	Boca Juniors	5–0	Newell's Old Boys	Buenos Aires
19:00 UTC−3	Giménez 6', 23'; Costa 31'; Aguirre 49'; Blanco 58'	Report	Montero (yellow card) 30'	Stadium: La Bombonera; Referee: Sebastian Zunino

11 October 2025 12	Barracas Central	v	Boca Juniors	Buenos Aires
14:30 UTC−3		Report		Stadium: Claudio Tapia; Referee: Nicolás Lamolina

18 October 2025 13	Boca Juniors	1–2	Belgrano	Buenos Aires
18:00 UTC−3	Blanco (yellow card) 27'; Paredes (yellow card) 45+5'; Battaglia (yellow card) 55'; Marchesín (yellow card) 56'; Zeballos 65'; Palacios (yellow card) 82'	Report	Maldonado (yellow card) 55'; Passerini 57' (pen.) (yellow card) 83'; Paredes 61' (o.g.); Cardozo (yellow card) 68'; Spörle (yellow card) 86'	Stadium: La Bombonera; Referee: Pablo Dóvalo

27 October 2025 12	Barracas Central	1–3	Boca Juniors	Buenos Aires
16:00 UTC−3	Barrios (yellow card) 2'; Tapia (yellow card) 6' (yellow-red card) 13'; Insúa 19' (yellow card) 75'; Miloc (yellow card) 44'; Ruiz (yellow card) 47'; Candia (yellow card) 58'	Report	Paredes (yellow card) 6'; Palacios (yellow card) 44'; Giménez 52', 55'; Merentiel 65'	Stadium: Claudio Tapia; Referee: Nicolás Lamolina
Note: Match postponed due to the death of Miguel Ángel Russo.

2 November 2025 14	Estudiantes (LP)	1–2	Boca Juniors	La Plata
16:00 UTC−3	Cetré (yellow card) 19' (goal) 58' (pen.); Rodríguez (yellow card) 45+1'; Núñez (yellow card) 45+5'; Neves (red card) 83'	Report	Giménez (yellow card) 17'; Zeballos (penalty missed) 45+4' 48'; Merentiel (yellow card) 45+5' (goal) 90+6' (pen.)	Stadium: Jorge Luis Hirschi; Referee: Leandro Rey Hilfer

9 November 2025 15	Boca Juniors	2–0	River Plate	Buenos Aires
16:30 UTC−3	Di Lollo (yellow card) 38'; Zeballos 45'; Merentiel 46'; Blanco (yellow card) 78'; Giménez (yellow card) 84'	Report	Martínez Quarta (yellow card) 13'; Acuña (yellow card) 45+3'; Armani (yellow card) 51'; Montiel (yellow card) 63'; Borja (yellow card) 69'; Galarza Fonda (yellow card) 71'; Galoppo (yellow card) 73'	Stadium: La Bombonera; Referee: Nicolás Ramírez

16 November 2025 16	Boca Juniors	2–0	Tigre	Buenos Aires
20:15 UTC−3	Costa 72'; Delgado (yellow card) 82'; Cavani 90+2' (pen.)	Report	López (yellow card) 43'; Oviedo (yellow card) 68'; Medina (yellow card) 76'	Stadium: La Bombonera; Referee: Darío Herrera

===== Final stages =====
23 November 2025 Round of 16	Boca Juniors	2–0	Talleres (C)	Buenos Aires
20:00 UTC−3	Merentiel 28', 46'; Paredes (yellow card) 38'	Report	Galarza (yellow card) 10'; Angulo (yellow card) 33'; Cáceres (penalty missed) 45'; Ortegoza (yellow card) 57'; Palomino (yellow card) 81'	Stadium: La Bombonera; Referee: Sebastian Zunino

30 November 2025 Quarterfinals	Boca Juniors	1–0	Argentinos Juniors	Buenos Aires
18:30 UTC−3	Costa 4'; Paredes (yellow card) 32'; Zeballos (yellow card) 42'; Di Lollo (yellow card) 50'; Delgado (yellow card) 73'; Belmonte (yellow card) 88'	Report	Godoy (yellow card) 42'; Oroz (yellow card) 45+4'	Stadium: La Bombonera; Referee: Fernando Echenique

7 December 2025 Semifinals	Boca Juniors	0–1	Racing	Buenos Aires
19:00 UTC−3	Barinaga (yellow card) 60'; Paredes (yellow card) 86'	Report	Nardoni (yellow card) 23'; Mura (yellow card) 42'; Di Cesare (yellow card) 45+2'; Colombo (yellow card) 55'; Martínez 74' (yellow card) 85'; Fernández (yellow card) 90+4'	Stadium: La Bombonera; Referee: Darío Herrera

=== Copa Argentina ===
22 January 2025 Round of 64	Boca Juniors	5–0	Argentino (MM)	Santa Fe
21:10 UTC−3	Zeballos 45+1'; Merentiel 45+4'; Janson 88'; Giménez 90'; Zenón 90+3'	Report	Díaz (yellow card) 14'; Fassino (yellow card) 31'; Cuesta (yellow card) 42'	Stadium: Brigadier General Estanislao López; Referee: Luis Lobo Medina

23 July 2025 Round of 32	Boca Juniors	1–2	Atlético Tucumán	Santiago del Estero
21:10 UTC−3	Fabra (yellow card) 60'; Paredes (yellow card) 71'; Cavani 90+7'	Report	Ferreira 65'; Bajamich 75'	Stadium: Único Madre de Ciudades; Referee: Hernán Mastrángelo

=== Copa Libertadores ===
==== Qualifying stage ====
===== Second stage =====
18 February 2025 First leg	Alianza Lima (Peru)	1–0	(Argentina) Boca Juniors	Lima, Peru
19:30 UTC−5	Noriega (yellow card) 1'; Ceppelini 4'; Trauco (yellow card) 17'; Enrique (yellow card) 48'; Barcos (yellow card) 85'; Zambrano (yellow card) 90+3'	Report	Alarcón (yellow card) 32'; Merentiel (yellow card) 34'; Battaglia (yellow card) 75'	Stadium: Estadio Alejandro Villanueva; Referee: Esteban Ostojich (Uruguay)

25 February 2025 Second leg	Boca Juniors (Argentina)	2–1 (2–2 agg.) (4–5 p)	(Peru) Alianza Lima	Buenos Aires, Argentina
21:30 UTC−3	Trauco 5' (o.g.); Zenón 58'; Merentiel (yellow card) 61'; Saracchi (yellow card) 64'; Giménez (yellow card) 90+3'	Report	Noriega (yellow card) 14'; Barcos 19'; Garcés (yellow card) 63'; Lavandeira (yellow card) 64'; Guerrero (yellow card) 90+1'	Stadium: La Bombonera; Referee: Piero Maza (Chile)
	Penalties
	Rojo (penalty scored); Cavani (penalty scored); Alarcón (penalty scored); Giménez (penalty scored); Velasco (penalty missed)		(penalty scored) Guerrero; (penalty scored) Gaibor; (penalty scored) Trauco; (penalty scored) Noriega; (penalty scored) Lavandeira

=== Club World Cup ===
==== Group stage ====
Pos	Team	Pld	W	D	L	GF	GA	GD	Pts	Qualification
1	(Portugal) Benfica	3	2	1	0	9	2	+7	7	Advance to knockout stage
2	(Germany) Bayern Munich	3	2	0	1	12	2	+10	6	Advance to knockout stage
3	(Argentina) Boca Juniors	3	0	2	1	4	5	−1	2	
4	(New Zealand) Auckland City	3	0	1	2	1	17	−16	1	

Source: FIFA
Rules for classification: Group stage tiebreakers

16 June 2025 1	Boca Juniors (Argentina)	2–2	(Portugal) Benfica	Miami Gardens, United States
19:00 UTC−3	Otamendi 21' (o.g.); Battaglia 27'; Herrera (red card) 45'; Palacios (yellow card) 66'; Costa (yellow card) 85'; Figal (red card) 88'	Report	Di María 45+3' (pen.); Carreras (yellow card) 67'; Belotti (red card) 70'; Pavlidis (yellow card) 83'; Otamendi 84'	Stadium: Hard Rock Stadium; Attendance: 55,574; Referee: César Arturo Ramos (Mexico)

20 June 2025 2	Bayern Munich (Germany)	2–1	(Argentina) Boca Juniors	Miami Gardens, United States
22:00 UTC−3	Kane 18'; Goretzka (yellow card) 45+3'; Olise 84'	Report	Rojo (yellow card) 15'; Advíncula (yellow card) 36'; Merentiel 66'; Di Lollo (yellow card) 71'	Stadium: Hard Rock Stadium; Attendance: 63,587; Referee: Alireza Faghani (Australia)

24 June 2025 3	Auckland City (New Zealand)	1–1	(Argentina) Boca Juniors	Nashville, United States
15:00 UTC−3	Gray 52'	Report	Garrow 26' (o.g.)	Stadium: Geodis Park; Attendance: 16,899; Referee: Glenn Nyberg (Sweden)

== Team statistics ==
	Total	Home	Away	Neutral
Games played	44	22	17	5
Games won	22	14	7	1
Games drawn	11	5	4	2
Games lost	11	3	6	2
Biggest win	5–0 vs Argentino (MM)	5–0 vs Newell's Old Boys	3–0 vs Central Córdoba (SdE)	5–0 vs Argentino (MM)
Biggest loss	0–2 vs Racing	0–1 vs Independiente	0–2 vs Racing	1–2 vs Bayern Munich
Biggest win (Torneo Apertura)	4–0 vs Defensa y Justicia	4–0 vs Defensa y Justiciaa	3–0 vs Central Córdoba (SdE)	None
Biggest win (Torneo Clausura)	5–0 vs Newell's Old Boys	5–0 vs Newell's Old Boys	3–0 vs Independiente Rivadavia	
Biggest win (Copa Argentina)	5–0 vs Argentino (MM)	None		5–0 vs Argentino (MM)
Biggest win (Copa Libertadores)	2–1 vs Alianza Lima	2–1 vs Alianza Lima	None	
Biggest win (Club World Cup)	None			
Biggest loss (Torneo Apertura)	0–2 vs Racing	0–1 vs Independiente	0–2 vs Racing	None
Biggest loss (Torneo Clausura)	0–1 vs Huracán	1–2 vs Belgrano	0–1 vs Huracán	None
Biggest loss (Copa Argentina)	1–2 vs Atlético Tucumán	None		1–2 vs Atlético Tucumán
Biggest loss (Copa Libertadores)	0–1 vs Alianza Lima	None	0–1 vs Alianza Lima	None
Biggest loss (Club World Cup)	1–2 vs Bayern Munich	None		1–2 vs Bayern Munich
Clean sheets	19	13	5	1
Goals scored	67	35	22	10
Goals conceded	34	11	16	7
Goal difference	+33	+24	+6	+3
Yellow cards	104	52	45	7
Red cards	4		2	2
Top scorer	Merentiel (15)	Merentiel (9)	Merentiel (4)	Merentiel (2)
Penalties for	6	3	3	
Penalties against	2	1	1	

=== Appearances and goals ===
As of December 7, 2025

No.	Pos	Nat	Player	Total		Torneo Apertura		Torneo Clausura		Copa Argentina		Copa Libertadores		Club World Cup	
No.	Pos	Nat	Player	Apps	Goals	Apps	Goals	Apps	Goals	Apps	Goals	Apps	Goals	Apps	Goals
Goalkeepers
12	GK	(Argentina) ARG	Leandro Brey	6	-2	2	-1	1+1	-1	1	0	0+1	0	0	0
13	GK	(Argentina) ARG	Javier García	0	0	0	0	0	0	0	0	0	0	0	0
25	GK	(Argentina) ARG	Agustín Marchesín	39	-32	16	-11	17	-12	1	-2	2	-2	3	-5
Defenders
2	DF	(Argentina) ARG	Cristian Lema	0	0	0	0	0	0	0	0	0	0	0	0
4	DF	(Argentina) ARG	Nicolás Figal	3	0	0	0	2	0	0	0	0	0	1	0
17	DF	(Peru) PER	Luis Advíncula	24	1	7+6	1	3+3	0	1	0	1	0	3	0
18	DF	(Colombia) COL	Frank Fabra	4	0	1+1	0	0	0	1+1	0	0	0	0	0
23	DF	(Argentina) ARG	Lautaro Blanco	37	1	13	0	19	1	0+1	0	0+1	0	3	0
24	DF	(Argentina) ARG	Juan Barinaga	22	0	2+1	0	16+1	0	1	0	1	0	0	0
26	DF	(Argentina) ARG	Marco Pellegrino	8	0	0	0	6	0	1	0	0	0	1	0
32	DF	(Argentina) ARG	Ayrton Costa	26	3	7+3	0	13	3	1	0	0	0	2	0
34	DF	(Argentina) ARG	Mateo Mendia	3	0	1	0	0+1	0	0	0	0+1	0	0	0
40	DF	(Argentina) ARG	Lautaro Di Lollo	31	3	7+4	1	15+1	2	1	0	1	0	2	0
42	DF	(Argentina) ARG	Lucas Blondel	12	0	9+2	0	0	0	0	0	1	0	0	0
Midfielders
5	MF	(Argentina) ARG	Leandro Paredes	18	1	0	0	16+1	1	1	0	0	0	0	0
6	MF	(Argentina) ARG	Rodrigo Battaglia	35	5	11+3	1	12+3	3	1	0	2	0	3	1
8	MF	(Chile) CHI	Carlos Palacios	36	3	13+2	3	15	0	1	0	2	0	3	0
14	MF	(Argentina) ARG	Ignacio Miramón	3	0	1+2	0	0	0	0	0	0	0	0	0
15	MF	(Chile) CHI	Williams Alarcón	25	0	5+5	0	2+8	0	1	0	1+1	0	0+2	0
19	MF	(Argentina) ARG	Agustín Martegani	2	0	1	0	0	0	0+1	0	0	0	0	0
21	MF	(Spain) ESP	Ander Herrera	17	0	4+2	0	1+7	0	1	0	1	0	1	0
22	MF	(Argentina) ARG	Kevin Zenón	33	4	12+4	2	0+10	0	0+2	1	1+1	1	2+1	0
27	MF	(Argentina) ARG	Malcom Braida	8	0	0	0	3	0	1+2	0	0	0	0+2	0
30	MF	(Argentina) ARG	Tomás Belmonte	23	0	12+1	0	2+6	0	0	0	0	0	1+1	0
38	MF	(Argentina) ARG	Camilo Rey Domenech	7	0	3+2	0	0	0	1	0	1	0	0	0
43	MF	(Argentina) ARG	Milton Delgado	24	0	11+1	0	8+3	0	0	0	1	0	0	0
51	MF	(Argentina) ARG	Santiago Dalmasso	1	0	0+1	0	0	0	0	0	0	0	0	0
Forwards
7	FW	(Argentina) ARG	Exequiel Zeballos	35	6	6+11	1	6+7	4	1	1	0+1	0	1+2	0
9	FW	(Argentina) ARG	Milton Giménez	34	10	10+4	4	10+4	5	0+1	1	0+2	0	0+3	0
10	FW	(Uruguay) URU	Edinson Cavani	24	5	10+1	2	6+4	2	1	1	1	0	1	0
11	FW	(Argentina) ARG	Lucas Janson	6	1	1+2	0	0+1	0	0+1	1	0+1	0	0	0
16	FW	(Uruguay) URU	Miguel Merentiel	44	15	8+10	6	19	7	2	1	2	0	3	1
20	FW	(Argentina) ARG	Alan Velasco	31	1	8+5	0	6+6	1	1	0	1+1	0	3	0
33	FW	(Argentina) ARG	Brian Aguirre	19	1	1+5	0	8+3	1	1+1	0	0	0	0	0
53	MF	(Argentina) ARG	Joaquín Ruiz	1	0	0+1	0	0	0	0	0	0	0	0	0
Players who have made an appearance or had a squad number this season, but have left the club
1	GK	(Argentina) ARG	Sergio Romero	0	0	0	0	0	0	0	0	0	0	0	0
3	DF	(Uruguay) URU	Marcelo Saracchi	11	1	4+3	1	0	0	1	0	2	0	0+1	0
6	DF	(Argentina) ARG	Marcos Rojo	13	1	12	1	0	0	0	0	1	0	0	0

=== Top scorers ===
As of December 7, 2025

Rank	Pos.	No.	Player	Torneo Apertura	Torneo Clausura	Copa Argentina	Copa Libertadores	Club World Cup	Total
1	FW	16	(Uruguay) Miguel Merentiel	6	7	1		1	15
2	FW	9	(Argentina) Milton Giménez	4	5	1			10
3	FW	7	(Argentina) Exequiel Zeballos	1	4	1			6
4	MF	29	(Argentina) Rodrigo Battaglia	1	3			1	5
5	FW	10	(Uruguay) Edinson Cavani	2	2	1			5
6	MF	22	(Argentina) Kevin Zenón	2		1	1		4
7	MF	8	(Chile) Carlos Palacios	3					3
8	DF	40	(Argentina) Lautaro Di Lollo	1	2				3
9	DF	32	(Argentina) Ayrton Costa		3				2
10	FW	11	(Argentina) Lucas Janson			1			1
11	DF	3	(Uruguay) Marcelo Saracchi	1					1
12	DF	17	(Peru) Luis Advíncula	1					1
13	DF	6	(Argentina) Marcos Rojo	1					1
14	FW	20	(Argentina) Alan Velasco		1				1
15	MF	5	(Argentina) Leandro Paredes		1				1
16	FW	33	(Argentina) Brian Aguirre		1				1
17	DF	23	(Argentina) Lautaro Blanco		1				1
Own goals				1	1		1	2	5
Totals				24	31	6	2	4	67

=== Top assists ===
As of December 7, 2025

Rank	Pos.	No.	Player	Torneo Apertura	Torneo Clausura	Copa Argentina	Copa Libertadores	Club World Cup	Total
1	FW	7	(Argentina) Exequiel Zeballos	1	3	1			5
2	MF	8	(Chile) Carlos Palacios	3	1				4
3	FW	16	(Uruguay) Miguel Merentiel	3	1				4
4	FW	9	(Argentina) Milton Giménez	1	2	1			4
5	MF	5	(Argentina) Leandro Paredes		4				4
6	FW	33	(Argentina) Brian Aguirre		2	1			3
7	DF	23	(Argentina) Lautaro Blanco	2	1				3
8	FW	10	(Uruguay) Edinson Cavani	2					2
9	DF	24	(Argentina) Juan Barinaga		2				2
10	DF	18	(Colombia) Frank Fabra			2			2
11	MF	43	(Argentina) Milton Delgado	1					1
12	DF	17	(Peru) Luis Advíncula	1					1
13	DF	42	(Argentina) Lucas Blondel	1					1
14	DF	32	(Argentina) Ayrton Costa					1	1
15	FW	20	(Argentina) Alan Velasco					1	1
16	MF	15	(Chile) Williams Alarcón		1				1
Totals				15	17	5		3	40

=== Clean sheets ===
As of December 7, 2025

Rank	Pos.	No.	Player	Torneo Apertura	Torneo Clausura	Copa Argentina	Copa Libertadores	Club World Cup	Total
1	GK	25	(Argentina) Agustín Marchesín	8	9				17
2	GK	12	(Argentina) Leandro Brey	1		1			2
Totals				9	9	1			19

=== Penalties ===
Date	Penalty Taker	Scored	Opponent	Competition
March 30, 2025	Edinson Cavani	No	Newell's Old Boys	Torneo Apertura
April 19, 2025	Edinson Cavani	No	Estudiantes (LP)	Torneo Apertura
September 27, 2025	Leandro Paredes	Yes	Defensa y Justicia	Torneo Clausura
November 2, 2025	Exequiel Zeballos	No	Estudiantes (LP)	Torneo Clausura
November 2, 2025	Miguel Merentiel	Yes	Estudiantes (LP)	Torneo Clausura
November 16, 2025	Edinson Cavani	Yes	Tigre	Torneo Clausura

=== Disciplinary record ===
As of December 7, 2025

No.	Pos	Nat	Player	Torneo Apertura			Torneo Clausura			Copa Argentina			Copa Libertadores			Club World Cup			Total		
No.	Pos	Nat	Player	Yellow card	(yellow card) (yellow-red card)	Red card	Yellow card	(yellow card) (yellow-red card)	Red card	Yellow card	(yellow card) (yellow-red card)	Red card	Yellow card	(yellow card) (yellow-red card)	Red card	Yellow card	(yellow card) (yellow-red card)	Red card	Yellow card	(yellow card) (yellow-red card)	Red card
Goalkeepers
12	GK	(Argentina)	Leandro Brey																		
13	GK	(Argentina)	Javier García																		
25	GK	(Argentina)	Agustín Marchesín	2			1												3		
Defenders
2	DF	(Argentina)	Cristian Lema																		
4	DF	(Argentina)	Nicolás Figal															1			1
17	DF	(Peru)	Luis Advíncula	2			1									1			4		
18	DF	(Colombia)	Frank Fabra	1						1									2		
23	DF	(Argentina)	Lautaro Blanco	3			2												5		
24	DF	(Argentina)	Juan Barinaga	2			1												3		
26	DF	(Argentina)	Marco Pellegrino				2												2		
32	DF	(Argentina)	Ayrton Costa	4	1		1									1			6	1	
34	DF	(Argentina)	Mateo Mendia																		
40	DF	(Argentina)	Lautaro Di Lollo	3			6									1			10		
42	DF	(Argentina)	Lucas Blondel	1															1		
Midfielders
5	MF	(Argentina)	Leandro Paredes				8			1									9		
6	MF	(Argentina)	Rodrigo Battaglia	5			1						1						7		
8	MF	(Chile)	Carlos Palacios	1			3									1			5		
14	MF	(Argentina)	Ignacio Miramón	1															1		
15	MF	(Chile)	Williams Alarcón	3			1						1						5		
19	MF	(Argentina)	Agustín Martegani																		
21	MF	(Spain)	Ander Herrera	1														1	1		1
22	MF	(Argentina)	Kevin Zenón	2		1													2		1
27	MF	(Argentina)	Malcom Braida				1												1		
30	MF	(Argentina)	Tomás Belmonte	3			1												4		
38	MF	(Argentina)	Camilo Rey Domenech																		
43	MF	(Argentina)	Milton Delgado	3			2												45		
51	MF	(Argentina)	Santiago Dalmasso																		
Forwards
7	FW	(Argentina)	Exequiel Zeballos	1			1												2		
9	FW	(Argentina)	Milton Giménez	2			4						1						7		
10	FW	(Uruguay)	Edinson Cavani	1			3												4		
11	FW	(Argentina)	Lucas Janson																		
16	FW	(Uruguay)	Miguel Merentiel	1			1						2						4		
20	FW	(Argentina)	Alan Velasco	2			3												5		
33	FW	(Argentina)	Brian Aguirre																		
53	MF	(Argentina)	Joaquín Ruiz																		
Players who have made an appearance or had a squad number this season, but have left the club
1	GK	(Argentina)	Sergio Romero																		
3	DF	(Uruguay)	Marcelo Saracchi	1									1						2		
6	DF	(Argentina)	Marcos Rojo	4												1			5		
Total				49	1	1	43			2			6			5		2	105	1	3
