= 2025 Copa Libertadores qualifying stages =

The 2025 Copa Libertadores qualifying stages were played from 4 February to 13 March 2025. A total of 19 teams competed in the qualifying stages to decide four of the 32 places in the group stage of the 2025 Copa Libertadores.

== Draw ==
The draw for the qualifying stages was held on 19 December 2024, 12:00 PYT (UTC−3), at the CONMEBOL Convention Centre in Luque, Paraguay.

Teams were seeded by their CONMEBOL Clubs ranking as of 16 December 2024 (shown in parentheses), taking into account the following three factors:

1. Performance in the last 10 years, taking into account Copa Libertadores and Copa Sudamericana results in the period 2015–2024.
2. Historical coefficient, taking into account Copa Libertadores and Copa Sudamericana results in the period 1960–2014 and 2002–2014 respectively.
3. Local tournament champion, with bonus points awarded to domestic league champions of the last 10 years.

For the first stage, the six teams were drawn into three ties (E1–E3), with the teams from Pot 1 hosting the second leg.

First stage draw
Pot 1	Pot 2
(Peru) Alianza Lima (50); (Ecuador) El Nacional (68); (Uruguay) Defensor Sporting (75)	(Paraguay) Nacional (85); (Venezuela) Monagas (99); (Bolivia) Blooming (111)

1. ^{†} The identity of the team from Bolivia was not known at the time the pots were announced and it was seeded in Pot 2.

For the second stage, the 16 teams were drawn into eight ties (C1–C8), with the teams from Pot 1 hosting the second leg. Teams from the same association could not be drawn into the same tie, excluding the three winners of the first stage, which were seeded in Pot 2 and whose identity was not known at the time of the draw, and could be drawn into the same tie with another team from the same association.

Second stage draw
Pot 1	Pot 2
(Argentina) Boca Juniors (3); (Brazil) Corinthians (18); (Paraguay) Cerro Porteño (20); (Ecuador) Barcelona (25); (Colombia) Santa Fe (45); (Peru) Melgar (51); (Brazil) Bahia (77); (Chile) Ñublense (90)	(Chile) Deportes Iquique (153); (Uruguay) Boston River (206); (Venezuela) Universidad Central (No rank); (Bolivia) The Strongest (36); (Colombia) Deportes Tolima (54); First stage winner E1; First stage winner E2; First stage winner E3

1. ^{†} The identity of the team from Bolivia and the second team from Colombia was not known at the time the pots were announced and they were seeded in Pot 2.

For the third stage, the eight winners of the second stage were allocated without any draw into the following four ties (G1–G4), with the team in each tie with the higher CONMEBOL ranking hosting the second leg.

- Second stage winner C1 vs. Second stage winner C8
- Second stage winner C2 vs. Second stage winner C7
- Second stage winner C3 vs. Second stage winner C6
- Second stage winner C4 vs. Second stage winner C5

== Format ==
In the qualifying stages, each tie was played on a home-and-away two-legged basis. If tied on aggregate, extra time was not played, and a penalty shoot-out was used to determine the winner (Regulations Article 2.4.3).

== Bracket ==
The qualifying stages were structured as follows:

- First stage (6 teams): The three winners of the first stage advanced to the second stage to join the 13 teams which were given byes to the second stage.
- Second stage (16 teams): The eight winners of the second stage advanced to the third stage.
- Third stage (8 teams): The four winners of the third stage advanced to the group stage to join the 28 direct entrants. The four teams eliminated in the third stage entered the Copa Sudamericana group stage.

The bracket was decided based on the first stage draw and second stage draw, which was held on 19 December 2024.

=== Winner G1 ===
First stage
(Chile) Deportes Iquique	Bye
(Colombia) Santa Fe	Bye
(Paraguay) Nacional	1	1	2
(Peru) Alianza Lima	1	3	4
(Argentina) Boca Juniors	Bye

Second stage
(Chile) Deportes Iquique (p)	2	1	3 (2)
(Colombia) Santa Fe	1	2	3 (1)
(Peru) Alianza Lima (p)	1	1	2 (5)
(Argentina) Boca Juniors	0	2	2 (4)

Third stage
(Chile) Deportes Iquique	1	1	2
(Peru) Alianza Lima	2	1	3

=== Winner G2 ===
First stage
(Uruguay) Boston River	Bye
(Chile) Ñublense	Bye
(Bolivia) The Strongest	Bye
(Brazil) Bahia	Bye

Second stage
(Uruguay) Boston River	1	1	2
(Chile) Ñublense	0	1	1
(Bolivia) The Strongest	1	0	1
(Brazil) Bahia	1	3	4

Third stage
(Uruguay) Boston River	0	0	0
(Brazil) Bahia	0	1	1

=== Winner G3 ===
First stage
(Colombia) Deportes Tolima	Bye
(Peru) Melgar	Bye
(Venezuela) Monagas	2	2	4
(Uruguay) Defensor Sporting	0	0	0
(Paraguay) Cerro Porteño	Bye

Second stage
(Colombia) Deportes Tolima	0	0	0
(Peru) Melgar	1	1	2
(Venezuela) Monagas	0	1	1
(Paraguay) Cerro Porteño	4	3	7

Third stage
(Peru) Melgar	0	2	2
(Paraguay) Cerro Porteño	1	4	5

=== Winner G4 ===
First stage
(Bolivia) Blooming	3	1	4 (3)
(Ecuador) El Nacional (p)	2	2	4 (4)
(Ecuador) Barcelona	Bye
(Venezuela) Universidad Central	Bye
(Brazil) Corinthians	Bye

Second stage
(Ecuador) El Nacional	0	1	1
(Ecuador) Barcelona	1	1	2
(Venezuela) Universidad Central	1	2	3
(Brazil) Corinthians	1	3	4

Third stage
(Ecuador) Barcelona	3	0	3
(Brazil) Corinthians	0	2	2

== First stage ==
=== Summary ===
The first legs were played on 4–6 February, and the second legs were played on 11–13 February 2025.

Team 1	Agg.	Team 2	1st leg	2nd leg
Blooming (Bolivia)	4–4 (3–4 p)	(Ecuador) El Nacional	3–2	1–2
Nacional (Paraguay)	2–4	(Peru) Alianza Lima	1–1	1–3
Monagas (Venezuela)	4–0	(Uruguay) Defensor Sporting	2–0	2–0

=== Matches ===
6 February 2025
20:30 UTC−4

Blooming (Bolivia)	3–2	(Ecuador) El Nacional
Garzón 16'; Villarroel 21'; Alaniz 37'	Report	Guisamano 27'; Ledesma 87'

Estadio Ramón Tahuichi Aguilera, Santa Cruz de la Sierra
Attendance: 14,870
Referee: Mario Díaz de Vivar (Paraguay)
13 February 2025
19:30 UTC−5

El Nacional (Ecuador)	2–1	(Bolivia) Blooming
Martínez 67'; Guisamano 75'	Report	Spenhay 19'
Penalties
Flor (penalty scored); Olmedo (penalty scored); Martínez (penalty scored); Mejía (penalty missed); Pazmiño (penalty scored)	4–3	(penalty scored) Villarroel; (penalty missed) Vadalá; (penalty scored) Alaniz; (penalty missed) Spenhay; (penalty scored) Enoumba

Estadio Olímpico Atahualpa, Quito
Attendance: 10,038
Referee: Flavio de Souza (Brazil)

Tied 4–4 on aggregate, El Nacional won on penalties and advanced to the second stage (Match C4).

5 February 2025
21:30 UTC−3

Nacional (Paraguay)	1–1	(Peru) Alianza Lima
Caballero 7'	Report	Barcos 90+9' (pen.)

Estadio Arsenio Erico, Asunción
Attendance: 1,405
Referee: Jhon Ospina (Colombia)
12 February 2025
19:30 UTC−5

Alianza Lima (Peru)	3–1	(Paraguay) Nacional
Quevedo 11', 55'; Barcos 50'	Report	Gaona 15'

Estadio Alejandro Villanueva, Lima
Attendance: 23,041
Referee: Piero Maza (Chile)

Alianza Lima won 4–2 on aggregate and advanced to the second stage (Match C8).

4 February 2025
20:30 UTC−4

Monagas (Venezuela)	2–0	(Uruguay) Defensor Sporting
T. Rodríguez 78'; Manríque 90'	Report

Estadio Monumental, Maturín
Attendance: 15,100
Referee: Augusto Aragón (Ecuador)
11 February 2025
21:30 UTC−3

Defensor Sporting (Uruguay)	0–2	(Venezuela) Monagas
	Report	T. Rodríguez 34'; Romero 61'

Estadio Centenario, Montevideo (Note: Defensor Sporting played their home match at Estadio Centenario, Montevideo instead of their regular stadium Estadio Luis Franzini, Montevideo which did not meet CONMEBOL requirements.)
Attendance: 1,738
Referee: Kevin Ortega (Peru)

Monagas won 4–0 on aggregate and advanced to the second stage (Match C3).

== Second stage ==
=== Summary ===
The first legs were played on 18–20 February, and the second legs were played on 25–27 February 2025.

Team 1	Agg.	Team 2	1st leg	2nd leg
Deportes Iquique (Chile)	3–3 (2–1 p)	(Colombia) Santa Fe	2–1	1–2
The Strongest (Bolivia)	1–4	(Brazil) Bahia	1–1	0–3
Monagas (Venezuela)	1–7	(Paraguay) Cerro Porteño	0–4	1–3
El Nacional (Ecuador)	1–2	(Ecuador) Barcelona	0–1	1–1
Universidad Central (Venezuela)	3–4	(Brazil) Corinthians	1–1	2–3
Deportes Tolima (Colombia)	0–2	(Peru) Melgar	0–1	0–1
Boston River (Uruguay)	2–1	(Chile) Ñublense	1–0	1–1
Alianza Lima (Peru)	2–2 (5–4 p)	(Argentina) Boca Juniors	1–0	1–2

=== Matches ===
18 February 2025
19:00 UTC−3

Deportes Iquique (Chile)	2–1	(Colombia) Santa Fe
Puch 35', 70' (pen.)	Report	Rodallega 2'

Estadio Tierra de Campeones, Iquique
Attendance: 8,794
Referee: Roberto Pérez (Peru)
25 February 2025
17:00 UTC−5

Santa Fe (Colombia)	2–1	(Chile) Deportes Iquique
Murillo 14'; Mafla 90+7'	Report	Pino 6'
Penalties
Albornoz (penalty missed); Ríos (penalty missed); Á. Rodríguez (penalty scored); D. Torres (penalty missed); Rodallega (penalty missed)	1–2	(penalty missed) Dávila; (penalty scored) Salinas; (penalty missed) Fuentes; (penalty scored) Soto

Estadio Metropolitano de Techo, Bogotá (Note: Santa Fe played their home match against Deportes Iquique at Estadio Metropolitano de Techo, Bogotá instead of their regular stadium Estadio El Campín, Bogotá which was reserved for Shakira's Las Mujeres Ya No Lloran World Tour.)
Attendance: 5,743
Referee: Derlis López (Paraguay)

Tied 3–3 on aggregate, Deportes Iquique won on penalties and advanced to the third stage (Match G1).

18 February 2025
20:30 UTC−4

The Strongest (Bolivia)	1–1	(Brazil) Bahia
Guerrero 38'	Report	Willian José 69'

Estadio Hernando Siles, La Paz
Attendance: 8,356
Referee: Guillermo Guerrero (Ecuador)
25 February 2025
21:30 UTC−3

Bahia (Brazil)	3–0	(Bolivia) The Strongest
Rodríguez 41' (pen.); Ademir 48', 63'	Report

Arena Fonte Nova, Salvador
Attendance: 45,161
Referee: Carlos Betancur (Colombia)

Bahia won 4–1 on aggregate and advanced to the third stage (Match G2).

20 February 2025
18:00 UTC−4

Monagas (Venezuela)	0–4	(Paraguay) Cerro Porteño
	Report	Da Costa 14'; Benítez 33'; Domínguez 45+3'; Viera 63'

Estadio Monumental, Maturín
Attendance: 14,930
Referee: Darío Herrera (Argentina)
27 February 2025
19:00 UTC−3

Cerro Porteño (Paraguay)	3–1	(Venezuela) Monagas
León 19'; Morel 45+4'; Viera 51'	Report	Rodríguez 4'

Estadio General Pablo Rojas, Asunción
Attendance: 11,126
Referee: Flavio de Souza (Brazil)

Cerro Porteño won 7–1 on aggregate and advanced to the third stage (Match G3).

19 February 2025
19:30 UTC−5

El Nacional (Ecuador)	0–1	(Ecuador) Barcelona
	Report	Vélez 78' (o.g.)

Estadio Olímpico Atahualpa, Quito
Attendance: 21,448
Referee: Cristian Garay (Chile)
26 February 2025
19:30 UTC−5

Barcelona (Ecuador)	1–1	(Ecuador) El Nacional
Rivero 68'	Report	Ledesma 45+9' (pen.)

Estadio Monumental Isidro Romero Carbo, Guayaquil
Referee: Esteban Ostojich (Uruguay)

Barcelona won 2–1 on aggregate and advanced to the third stage (Match G4).

19 February 2025
20:30 UTC−4

Universidad Central (Venezuela)	1–1	(Brazil) Corinthians
João Pedro 75' (o.g.)	Report	Carrillo 36'

Estadio Olímpico de la UCV, Caracas
Attendance: 4,732
Referee: Gustavo Tejera (Uruguay)
26 February 2025
21:30 UTC−3

Corinthians (Brazil)	3–2	(Venezuela) Universidad Central
Yuri Alberto 3', 89'; Matheus Bidu 40'	Report	Cuesta 6'; A. Martínez 45+1'

Neo Química Arena, São Paulo
Attendance: 44,643
Referee: Wilmar Roldán (Colombia)

Corinthians won 4–3 on aggregate and advanced to the third stage (Match G4).

20 February 2025
19:30 UTC−5

Deportes Tolima (Colombia)	0–1	(Peru) Melgar
	Report	Cabrera 36'

Estadio Manuel Murillo Toro, Ibagué
Attendance: 4,075
Referee: Ramon Abatti (Brazil)
27 February 2025
19:30 UTC−5

Melgar (Peru)	1–0	(Colombia) Deportes Tolima
Bordacahar 86' (pen.)	Report

Estadio Monumental de la UNSA, Arequipa
Attendance: 27,956
Referee: Carlos Benítez (Paraguay)

Melgar won 2–0 on aggregate and advanced to the third stage (Match G3).

19 February 2025
19:00 UTC−3

Boston River (Uruguay)	1–0	(Chile) Ñublense
Gutiérrez 77' (pen.)	Report

Estadio Centenario, Montevideo (Note: Boston River played their home matches at Estadio Centenario, Montevideo instead of their regular stadium Estadio Campeones Olímpicos, Florida which did not meet CONMEBOL requirements.)
Attendance: 2,077
Referee: Ivo Méndez (Bolivia)
26 February 2025
19:00 UTC−3

Ñublense (Chile)	1–1	(Uruguay) Boston River
M. Rodríguez 9'	Report	Anello 85'

Estadio Municipal Nelson Oyarzún Arenas, Chillán
Attendance: 8,495
Referee: Leandro Rey Hilfer (Argentina)

Boston River won 2–1 on aggregate and advanced to the third stage (Match G2).

18 February 2025
19:30 UTC−5

Alianza Lima (Peru)	1–0	(Argentina) Boca Juniors
Ceppelini 4'	Report

Estadio Alejandro Villanueva, Lima
Attendance: 27,869
Referee: Esteban Ostojich (Uruguay)
25 February 2025
21:30 UTC−3

Boca Juniors (Argentina)	2–1	(Peru) Alianza Lima
Trauco 5' (o.g.); Zenón 58'	Report	Barcos 19'
Penalties
Rojo (penalty scored); Cavani (penalty scored); Alarcón (penalty scored); Giménez (penalty scored); Velasco (penalty missed)	4–5	(penalty scored) Guerrero; (penalty scored) Gaibor; (penalty scored) Trauco; (penalty scored) Noriega; (penalty scored) Lavandeira

La Bombonera, Buenos Aires
Attendance: 28,099
Referee: Piero Maza (Chile)

Tied 2–2 on aggregate, Alianza Lima won on penalties and advanced to the third stage (Match G1).

== Third stage ==
=== Summary ===
The first legs were played on 4–6 March, and the second legs were played on 11–13 March 2025.

Team 1	Agg.	Team 2	1st leg	2nd leg
Deportes Iquique (Chile)	2–3	(Peru) Alianza Lima	1–2	1–1
Boston River (Uruguay)	0–1	(Brazil) Bahia	0–0	0–1
Melgar (Peru)	2–5	(Paraguay) Cerro Porteño	0–1	2–4
Barcelona (Ecuador)	3–2	(Brazil) Corinthians	3–0	0–2

=== Matches ===
4 March 2025
19:00 UTC−3

Deportes Iquique (Chile)	1–2	(Peru) Alianza Lima
Zambrano 66' (o.g.)	Report	Barcos 31'; E. Castillo 34'

Estadio Tierra de Campeones, Iquique
Attendance: 10,446
Referee: Flavio de Souza (Brazil)
11 March 2025
17:00 UTC−5

Alianza Lima (Peru)	1–1	(Chile) Deportes Iquique
Quevedo 42'	Report	Dávila 90'

Estadio Alejandro Villanueva, Lima
Attendance: 27,007
Referee: Yael Falcón Pérez (Argentina)

Alianza Lima won 3–2 on aggregate and advanced to the group stage.

6 March 2025
21:30 UTC−3

Boston River (Uruguay)	0–0	(Brazil) Bahia
	Report

Estadio Centenario, Montevideo
Referee: Juan Gabriel Benítez (Paraguay)
13 March 2025
21:30 UTC−3

Bahia (Brazil)	1–0	(Uruguay) Boston River
Jean Lucas 59'	Report

Arena Fonte Nova, Salvador
Attendance: 40,670
Referee: Cristian Garay (Chile)

Bahia won 1–0 on aggregate and advanced to the group stage.

5 March 2025
17:00 UTC−5

Melgar (Peru)	0–1	(Paraguay) Cerro Porteño
	Report	Piris Da Motta 34' (pen.)

Estadio Monumental de la UNSA, Arequipa
Attendance: 19,589
Referee: Piero Maza (Chile)
12 March 2025
19:00 UTC−3

Cerro Porteño (Paraguay)	4–2	(Peru) Melgar
Araujo 12'; Carrizo 56'; Da Costa 70'; Fariña 79'	Report	Martínez 45+6' (pen.); Liza 89'

Estadio General Pablo Rojas, Asunción
Attendance: 13,049
Referee: Raphael Claus (Brazil)

Cerro Porteño won 5–2 on aggregate and advanced to the group stage.

5 March 2025
19:30 UTC−5

Barcelona (Ecuador)	3–0	(Brazil) Corinthians
Corozo 45+2' (pen.), 84'; Rivero 80'	Report

Estadio Monumental Isidro Romero Carbo, Guayaquil
Attendance: 16,188
Referee: Darío Herrera (Argentina)
12 March 2025
21:30 UTC−3

Corinthians (Brazil)	2–0	(Ecuador) Barcelona
Torres 40'; Carrillo 84'	Report

Neo Química Arena, São Paulo
Attendance: 44,877
Referee: Esteban Ostojich (Uruguay)

Barcelona won 3–2 on aggregate and advanced to the group stage.
