= Frank Fabra =

Colombian footballer (born 1991)

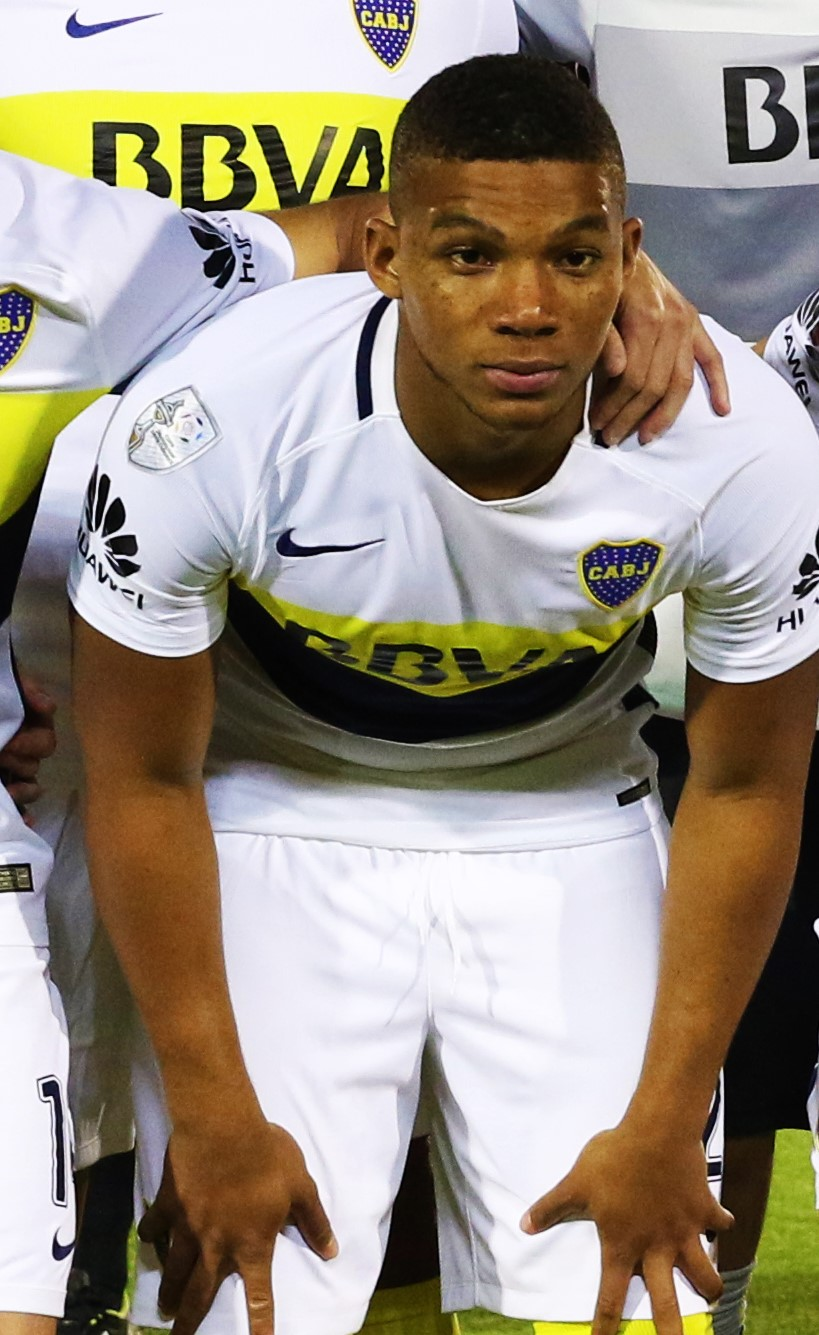
- Fabra with Boca Juniors in 2016

Personal information
- Full name: Frank Yusty Fabra Palacios
- Date of birth: 22 February 1991 (age 35)
- Place of birth: Nechí, Colombia
- Height: 1.74 m (5 ft 9 in)
- Position: Left-back

Team information
- Current team: Independiente Medellín
- Number: 18

Senior career*
Years	Team	Apps	(Gls)
2010–2015	Envigado	90	(3)
2014–2015	→ Deportivo Cali (loan)	38	(1)
2015–2016	Independiente Medellín	18	(1)
2016–2026	Boca Juniors	167	(10)
2026–	Independiente Medellín	1	(0)

International career^{‡}
2015–2023	Colombia	28	(1)
Medal record
Colombia
Copa América Centenario
Bronze medal – third place	2016 United States
Third place	2021 Brazil
- * Club domestic league appearances and goals as of 18 February 2026 ‡ National team caps and goals as of 27 September 2022 (UTC)

Frank Yusty Fabra Palacios (born 22 February 1991) is a Colombian professional footballer who plays as left-back for Independiente Medellín. Fabra's last club was Argentine Primera División club Boca Juniors, where he played from 2016 to January 2026. Fabra was also part of the Colombia national team.

He began his career with Envigado, debuting in 2010. He joined Deportivo Cali in 2014, where he was part of the squad that won the 2015 Apertura. After a brief spell at Independiente Medellín, Fabra signed for Boca Juniors on a three-year deal.

Fabra made his international debut for Colombia in 2015, and was part of the squads that finished third at the Copa América in 2016 and 2021.

== Club career ==
=== Envigado ===
Fabra is a product of Envigado's youth system. At the age of 18, he was called up to the first team and debuted on 22 July 2010 against Cúcuta Deportivo. Despite his young age, Fabra quickly made himself a first team player, earning 106 caps and scoring three goals for El Equipo Naranja after four seasons at the club.

=== Deportivo Cali ===
In July 2014, Fabra was loaned out to fellow Colombian club Deportivo Cali for 6 months with a purchase option. During his loan spell in Cali, he was fast to install himself into the starting eleven, scoring once and earning 26 caps. The 2015 Apertura was Fabra's first big break, as he helped guide Cali to secure its ninth league. Following his first career title, Fabra was included in the Apertura's team of the season.

=== Independiente Medellín ===
For the 2015 Clausura, Fabra signed for Independiente Medellín after being heavily requested by Leonel Álvarez, Independiente's manager at the time. Fabra did not waste time during his adaptation and was quick to form part of the team's starting eleven. on 25 July, he scored his first goal for the Paisa club in a 1–0 victory against Deportes Tolima.

=== Boca Juniors ===
On 24 January 2016, Fabra signed a three-and-a-half-year contract with Argentine super club Boca Juniors despite heavy interest from several clubs in South America and Europe. He made his debut on 14 February in a home loss against Atlético Tucumán, having to leave the pitch after 44 minutes due to a later confirmed injury. His first goal came at the 2016 Copa Libertadores and was against his former club Deportivo Cali. The match ended in a 6–2 victory for Boca. On 12 May, Fabra scored an important away goal during the first leg of quarter-finals against Uruguayans Club Nacional. The match finished in a one-goal draw. The second leg finished with the same score, forcing a penalty shoot out between the teams. Fabra converted his penalty in a cheeky manner with some people comparing it to the way Diego Maradona often converted his own. Boca advanced to the semi-finals winning 4–3 on penalties and the series ended 2–2 on aggregate.

On 11 September 2016, Fabra scored his third goal for the Xeneizes against Belgrano in a 3–0 home triumph for match day three of the season. Fabra won the 2016–17 Argentine Primera División with Boca Juniors, making the achievement his first title with the club.

Sequentially after the end of Jonathan Silva's loan the following year, Fabra saw himself as the club's first choice left-back. For match day four of the 2017–18 season, Fabra found the net in Boca's 4–0 thrashing of Vélez Sarsfield. His second goal of the season arrived against Atlético Temperley, the sole celebration of the match.

On 3 November 2019, Fabra scored his first brace for Boca Juniors in a 5–1 route of Arsenal de Sarandí.

== International career ==
On 28 August 2015, Fabra received his first call up from José Pékerman to Colombia's senior team to play a friendly against Peru. Fabra made his debut on 8 September, playing 90 minutes in a 1–1 draw against the Peruvians. His first official game was also against Peru, this time for the 2018 FIFA World Cup qualifiers. Colombia secured 3 points, claiming a 2–0 victory in the Estadio Metropolitano of Barranquilla.

He was included in Colombia's 23-man squad for the Copa América Centenario, tournament where Fabra scored his first international goal against Costa Rica. He appeared four times at the tournament as Colombia clinched a third-place finish.

During the later part of the 2018 World Cup qualifiers, Fabra broke into the starting eleven for the rest of the matches with Colombia eventually finishing fourth thus earning direct qualification for the 2018 World Cup in Russia.

In May 2018 Fabra was named in Colombia's squad for the 2018 FIFA World Cup in Russia. However, he was ruled out of the tournament after sustaining an anterior cruciate ligament tear in his left knee during training on 9 June 2018.

== Personal life ==
Fabra is married to fellow Colombian Tatiana Gómez, with whom he has a son. Since 2019, Fabra has been a citizen of Argentina.

== Career statistics ==
=== Club ===
As of 30 December 2025

Club	Season	League			National Cup		Continental		Other		Total	
Club	Season	Division	Apps	Goals	Apps	Goals	Apps	Goals	Apps	Goals	Apps	Goals
Envigado	2010	Categoría Primera A	4	0	—		—		2 (Note: Appearance(s) in Relegation/promotion playoff)	0	6	0
Envigado	2011	Categoría Primera A	10	0	7	0	—		—		17	0
Envigado	2012	Categoría Primera A	32	1	3	0	3 (Note: Appearance(s) in Copa Sudamericana)	0	—		38	1
Envigado	2013	Categoría Primera A	29	1	1	0	—		—		30	1
Envigado	2014	Categoría Primera A	15	1	—		—		—		15	1
Envigado	Total		90	3	11	0	3	0	2	0	106	3
Deportivo Cali (loan)	2014	Categoría Primera A	19	1	3	0	4	0	—		26	1
Deportivo Cali (loan)	2015	Categoría Primera A	19	0	2	0	—		—		21	0
Deportivo Cali (loan)	Total		38	1	5	0	4	0	—		47	1
Independiente Medellín	2015	Categoría Primera A	18	1	6	0	—		—		24	1
Boca Juniors	2016	Primera División	2	0	—		10 (Note: Appearance(s) in Copa Libertadores)	2	1 (Note: Appearance(s) in Torneos de Verano)	0	13	2
Boca Juniors	2016-17	Primera División	20	1	2	0	—		2	0	24	1
Boca Juniors	2017-18	Primera División	22	2	2	1	4	1	1 (Note: Appearance(s) in Supercopa Argentina)	0	29	4
Boca Juniors	2018-19	Primera División	1	0	0	0	0	0	2 (Note: Appearance(s) in Copa de la Superliga)	0	3	0
Boca Juniors	2019-20	Primera División	18	2	2	0	—		1	0	21	2
Boca Juniors	2020-21	Primera División	4	0	4	0	10	0	—		18	0
Boca Juniors	2021	Primera División	33	2	—		3	0	—		36	2
Boca Juniors	2022	Primera División	36	3	3	0	7	0	4 (Note: Three appearances in Torneos de Verano, One appearance in Trofeo de Campeones)	0	50	3
Boca Juniors	2023	Primera División	22	0	2	0	11	0	2 (Note: One appearance in Supercopa Argentina, One appearance in Supercopa Internacional)	0	37	0
Boca Juniors	2024	Primera División	7	0	—		3	0	—		10	0
Boca Juniors	2025	Primera División	2	0	1	0	—		—		3	0
Boca Juniors	Total		167	10	16	1	48	3	13	0	244	14
Career Total			313	15	38	1	55	3	15	0	421	19

== International ==
As of match played 17 November 2020. Colombia score listed first, score column indicates score after each Fabra goal.

International goals by date, venue, cap, opponent, score, result and competition
No.	Date	Venue	Cap	Opponent	Score	Result	Competition
1	11 June 2016	NRG Stadium, Houston, United States	7	Costa Rica	1–1	2–3	Copa América Centenario

== Honours ==
Deportivo Cali

- Primera A: 2015 Apertura

Boca Juniors

- Argentine Primera División: 2016–17, 2017–18, 2019–20, 2022
- Copa Argentina: 2019–20
- Copa de la Liga Profesional: 2020, 2022
- Supercopa Argentina: 2018, 2022

Individual

- Copa Libertadores Team of the Tournament: 2016
- Argentine Primera División Team of the Season: 2016–17, 2023
