= Carlos Palacios (Chilean footballer) =

Chilean footballer (born 2000)

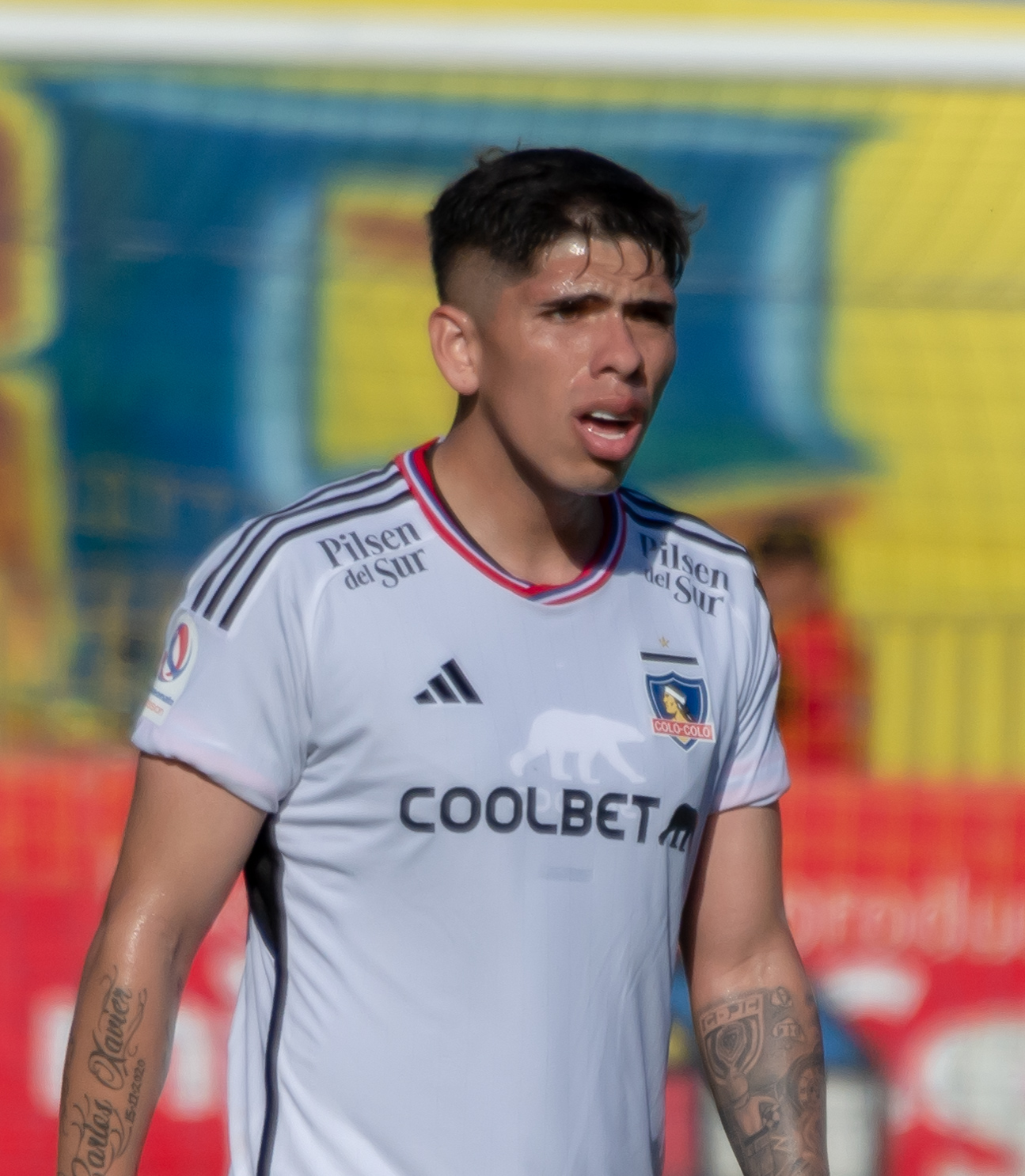
- Palacios with Colo-Colo in 2023

Personal information
- Full name: Carlos Enrique Palacios Núñez
- Date of birth: 20 July 2000 (age 26)
- Place of birth: Renca, Chile
- Height: 1.80 m (5 ft 11 in)
- Position: Midfielder

Team information
- Current team: Boca Juniors
- Number: 7

Youth career
- 2009–2012: Santiago Morning
- 2012–2018: Unión Española

Senior career*
Years	Team	Apps	(Gls)
2017–2022	Unión Española	58	(10)
2021–2022	→ Internacional (loan)	29	(0)
2022–2024	Vasco da Gama	24	(1)
2023–2024	→ Colo-Colo (loan)	34	(9)
2024	Colo-Colo	12	(5)
2025–	Boca Juniors	30	(3)

International career^{‡}
2020–	Chile	9	(0)
- * Club domestic league appearances and goals as of 7 December 2025 ‡ National team caps and goals as of 23:20, 10 October 2024 (UTC)

Carlos Enrique Palacios Núñez (born 20 July 2000) is a Chilean footballer who plays as a midfielder for Argentine club Boca Juniors and the Chile national team.

== Club career ==
Palacios is a youth product of Unión Española and made his professional debut with the team on 19 February 2018 in a 1–1 draw against Deportes Antofagasta. He scored his first on 5 October 2019 in a 1–1 draw against Universidad de Concepción.

On 22 March 2021, he was announced as a new player for Brazilian Série A side Internacional on a deal for a year on loan from Unión Española and a transfer promise for additional three years.

Following Internacional, Palacios switched to Vasco da Gama in April 2022. The next year, he was loaned out to Chilean club Colo-Colo. In the second half of 2024, Colo-Colo purchased 50% of the rights of the player. The next year, Palacios moved to Argentine club Boca Juniors.

== International career ==
In November 2020, he received his first call up to the Chile senior team for the 2022 World Cup qualifiers against Peru and Venezuela, making his international debut in the match against Venezuela.

== Personal life ==
Palacios has been nicknamed La Joya ("The Jewel") for his talent. Fans have also humorously compared him to the Titán Carguero ("Cart Titan") from the anime series Attack on Titan, due to a perceived resemblance.

In July 2026, Palacios was involved in drug trafficking after his father-in-law, allegedly the leader of a gang called Los Pájaros (The Birds), used his car and was arrested in La Florida, Chile. In November of the same year, he made a statement as an accused.

== Career statistics ==
=== Club ===
As of 7 December 2025.

Club	Season	League			State League		Cup		Continental		Other		Total	
Club	Season	Division	Apps	Goals	Apps	Goals	Apps	Goals	Apps	Goals	Apps	Goals	Apps	Goals
Unión Española	2018	Chilean Primera División	14	0	—		3	0	0	0	—		17	0
Unión Española	2019	Chilean Primera División	5	2	—		1	0	—		—		6	2
Unión Española	2020	Chilean Primera División	33	8	—		—		—		—		33	8
Unión Española	2021	Chilean Primera División	—		—		—		2 (Note: Appearances in the Copa Libertadores)	0	—		2	0
Unión Española	Total		52	10	—		4	0	2	0	—		58	10
Internacional (loan)	2021	Série A	20	0	8 (Note: Appearances in the Campeonato Gaúcho)	0	0	0	6	0	—		34	0
Internacional (loan)	2022	Série A	0	0	1	0	0	0	—		—		1	0
Internacional (loan)	Total		20	0	9	0	0	0	6	0	—		35	0
Vasco da Gama	2022	Série B	24	1	—		—		—		—		24	1
Colo-Colo	2023	Chilean Primera División	23	7	—		7	5	5 (Note: Three appearances and one goal in Copa Libertadores, two appearances in Copa Sudamericana)	1	0	0	35	13
Colo-Colo	2024	Chilean Primera División	23	7	—		4	2	14	3	1 (Note: Appearance in Supercopa de Chile)	1	42	13
Colo-Colo	Total		46	14	—		11	7	19	4	1	1	77	26
Boca Juniors	2025	Argentine Primera División	30	3	—		1	0	2	0	3 (Note: Appearances in FIFA Club World Cup)	0	36	3
Career total			172	28	9	0	16	7	29	4	4	1	230	40

=== International ===
As of match played on 10 October 2024

Appearances and goals by national team and year
National team	Year	Apps	Goals
Chile	2020	1	0
Chile	2021	6	0
Chile	2024	3	0
Total		10	0

== Honors ==
Colo-Colo

- Chilean Primera División: 2024

Boca Juniors

- Argentine Primera División: 2026 Liga
- Copa Sudamericana: 2026

Individual

- Chilean Primera División Team of the Season: 2024
