= Marco Pellegrino =

Argentine footballer (born 2002)

Personal information
- Date of birth: 18 July 2002 (age 24)
- Place of birth: Buenos Aires, Argentina
- Height: 1.84 m (6 ft 0 in)
- Position: Centre-back

Team information
- Current team: Boca Juniors
- Number: 26

Youth career
- 2010–2023: Platense
- 2024: AC Milan

Senior career*
Years	Team	Apps	(Gls)
2023	Platense	17	(1)
2023–2025	AC Milan	1	(0)
2024	→ Salernitana (loan)	10	(0)
2024	→ Independiente (loan)	7	(0)
2025	→ Huracán (loan)	18	(1)
2025–	Boca Juniors	10	(0)

International career^{‡}
2023–	Argentina U23	3	(0)
- * Club domestic league appearances and goals as of 17:29, 16 June 2026 (UTC) ‡ National team caps and goals as of 23:45, 17 February 2025 (UTC)

Marco Pellegrino (born 18 July 2002) is an Argentine professional footballer who plays as a defender for Primera División club Boca Juniors.

== Early life ==
Born in Buenos Aires, in a family with Italian origins, Marco Pellegrino first played youth tennis at high level, before switching to football.

== Club career ==
=== Platense ===
Marco Pellegrino joined the Club Atlético Platense academy in 2010. He signed his first professional contract with the club in November 2021.

Marco Pellegrino made his professional debut for Platense on the 14 March 2023, starting the Primera División game against Vélez Sarsfield. On July 30, he scored his first ever goal in a 1–1 draw against Gimnasia, coincidentally his last game for the club.

=== Milan ===
On 22 August 2023, Pellegrino joined Italian Serie A club AC Milan on a five-year contract until 30 June 2028.

On 29 October 2023, Pellegrino made his debut for Milan in a 2–2 away draw with Napoli, coming on as a substitute for the injured Pierre Kalulu 19 minutes into the game. However, at the 87th minute, Pellegrino himself had to be substituted due to an injury that ruled him out of play for three months. He came back from injury to play with the Primavera side in January 2024.

==== Loan to Salernitana ====
On 1 February 2024, Pellegrino joined fellow Serie A club Salernitana on a six-month loan until the end of the season.

==== Loan to Independiente ====
On 10 August 2024, he moved back to Argentina and joined Primera División club Independiente on loan for the 2024–25 season. His loan spell was cut short and he returned to AC Milan on 31 December 2024.

==== Loan to Huracán ====
On 18 January 2025, Pellegrino joined Primera División club Huracán, on a six-month loan until the end of the season.

=== Boca Juniors ===
On 10 June 2025, Pellegrino joined Primera División club Boca Juniors permanently, on a four-year contract until 30 June 2029.

== International career ==
He made his debut with the Argentina national under-23 team for a 1–1 draw in a friendly match against the Venezuela national under-23 team on 14 October 2023, featuring full-time as a starter.

Pellegrino was part of the 34 players that were called up to the Argentina national team for the 2026 FIFA World Cup qualification matches against Paraguay and Peru on 12 and 17 October 2023, respectively.

== Career statistics ==
As of match played 24 August 2025

Appearances and goals by club, season and competition
Club	Season	League			National cup		Continental		Other		Total	
Club	Season	Division	Apps	Goals	Apps	Goals	Apps	Goals	Apps	Goals	Apps	Goals
Platense	2023	Primera División	17	1	—		—		—		17	1
AC Milan	2023–24	Serie A	1	0	0	0	0	0	—		1	0
Salernitana (loan)	2023–24	Serie A	10	0	—		—		—		10	0
Independiente (loan)	2024	Primera División	7	0	—		—		—		7	0
Huracán (loan)	2025	Primera División	18	1	1	0	5	0	—		24	1
Boca Juniors	2025	Primera División	6	0	1	0	—		1 (Note: Appearances in FIFA Club World Cup)	0	8	0
Career total			59	2	2	0	5	0	1	0	67	2

== Honours ==
Boca Juniors

- Argentine Primera División: 2026 Liga
