= Benjamín Schamine =

Argentine footballer

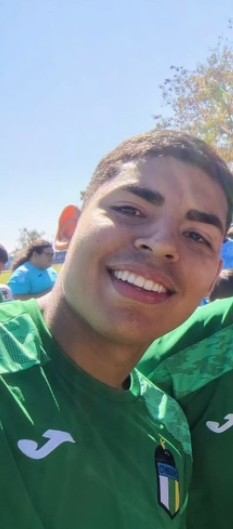
- Schamine with O'Higgins in 2026

Personal information
- Full name: Benjamín Facundo Schamine
- Date of birth: 24 October 2003 (age 23)
- Place of birth: Santa Rosa, La Pampa, Argentina
- Height: 1.78 m (5 ft 10 in)
- Position: Midfielder

Team information
- Current team: Godoy Cruz (on loan from Defensa y Justicia)

Youth career
- Mac Allister
- 2018–2023: Defensa y Justicia

Senior career*
Years	Team	Apps	(Gls)
2023–	Defensa y Justicia	44	(2)
2026	→ O'Higgins (loan)	13	(1)
2026–	→ Godoy Cruz (loan)	0	(0)
- * Club domestic league appearances and goals as of 5 July 2026

Benjamín Facundo Schamine (born 24 October 2003) is an Argentine footballer who plays as a midfielder for Godoy Cruz on loan from Defensa y Justicia.

== Career ==
Born in Santa Rosa, La Pampa, Argentina, Schamine joined the Defensa y Justicia youth ranks in 2018 and made his professional debut in the 2–2 away draw against Godoy Cruz on 15 July 2023 for the Argentine Primera División. He scored his first goal in the 0–4 away win against Tigre on 11 November 2024.

In January 2026, Schamine moved abroad and joined Chilean club O'Higgins on a one-year loan. He returned to Argentina for the second half of the year with Godoy Cruz.

== Personal life ==
Schamine is nicknamed Toti.
