= Tiago Serrago =

Argentine footballer (born 2004)

Personal information
- Date of birth: 5 February 2004 (age 22)
- Place of birth: Palermo, Buenos Aires
- Height: 1.75 m (5 ft 9 in)
- Position: Midfielder

Team information
- Current team: Tigre (on loan from River Plate)
- Number: 11

Youth career
- ?–2010: GEBA
- 2010–2024: River Plate

Senior career*
Years	Team	Apps	(Gls)
2024–	River Plate	0	(0)
2024	→ Defensa y Justicia (loan)	0	(0)
2025	→ Aldosivi (loan)	24	(2)
2026–	→ Tigre (loan)	22	(2)
- * Club domestic league appearances and goals as of 17:49, 9 November 2026 (UTC)

Tiago Serrago (born 5 February 2004) is an Argentine professional association football player who plays as an attacking midfielder for Argentine Primera División club Tigre, on loan from River Plate.

== Club career ==
=== Early career ===
Serrago born 5 February 2004 on Palermo, Buenos Aires. He began his football career at Gimnasia y Esgrima de Buenos Aires. Then, at the age of six, he joined "Escuela de Fútbol de Ángel Labruna" (of River Plate), tried out for the youth teams, and was soon accepted after demonstrating his skills in practice.

=== River Plate ===
In 2019, playing for the seventh division, he scored a goal against Boca Juniors in an away match. The goal sealed River Plate's 3–0 victory.

In March 2023, he scored his first goal for the River Plate reserve squad against Lanús in the Torneo Proyección. He then traveled with the first team for a friendly match against Universidad de Chile, although he did not make his debut.

In March 2021, he signed his first contract with River Plate for three years. While in November 2023, he extended said contract until December 2025.

==== Loan to Defensa y Justicia ====
In February 2024, Serrago was loaned to Defensa y Justicia. He made his first division debut in the 1–1 draw against Central Córdoba (SdE) in the Copa de la Liga Profesional.

==== Loan to Aldosivi ====
In January 2025 he was loaned out for one year. On March 22 of that same year, he scored his first professional goal against Boca Juniors, just 28 seconds after coming on as a substitute.

==== Loan to Tigre ====
In December 2025 he was loaned out for one year, free of charge and with a buyout clause of $1,600,000 for 50% of his transfer rights.

On February 7, 2026, he scored his first goal for the club, in a 4–1 victory against his former club River Plate at the Monumental Stadium, scoring in the 6th minute to make it 1–0.
