= Roger Manríque =

Venezuelan footballer (born 1999)

Personal information
- Full name: Roger Alexander Manríque Laorca
- Date of birth: 23 March 1999 (age 27)
- Place of birth: Maracay, Venezuela
- Height: 1.81 m (5 ft 11 in)
- Position: Defender

Team information
- Current team: Monagas
- Number: 27

Senior career*
Years	Team	Apps	(Gls)
2019–2022	Aragua F.C.	68	(4)
2023–2024	Caracas	23	(0)
2024–	Monagas	7	(0)
- * Club domestic league appearances and goals as of 3 November 2020

Roger Alexander Manríque Laorca (born 23 March 1999) is a Venezuelan footballer who plays as a defender for Monagas in the Venezuelan Primera División.

== Career ==
=== Aragua ===
A graduate of the club's youth academy, Manríque made his competitive debut on 24 March 2019 in a 2–1 away victory over Estudiantes de Caracas.
