= Piero Vivanco =

Peruvian footballer (born 2000)

Personal information
- Full name: Piero Antonio Vivanco Ayala
- Date of birth: 17 January 2000 (age 26)
- Place of birth: Lima, Peru
- Height: 1.80 m (5 ft 11 in)
- Position: Midfielder

Team information
- Current team: Universidad San Martín (on loan from Huachipato)
- Number: 26

Youth career
- –2017: Esther Grande

Senior career*
Years	Team	Apps	(Gls)
2018–	Huachipato	2	(0)
2020–	→ San Martín (loan)	2	(1)
- * Club domestic league appearances and goals as of 08:07, 11 June 2020 (UTC)

Piero Antonio Vivanco Ayala (born 17 January 2000) is a Peruvian footballer who plays as a midfielder for Universidad San Martín on loan from Chilean Primera División side Huachipato.

== Career statistics ==
=== Club ===
As of 24 September 2024.

Club	Division	League			Cup		Continental		Total	
Club	Division	Season	Apps	Goals	Apps	Goals	Apps	Goals	Apps	Goals
Huachipato	2018	Chilean Primera División	1	0	2	0	0	0	3	0
Huachipato	2019	Chilean Primera División	1	0	—		—		1	0
Huachipato	Total		2	0	2	0	0	0	4	0
San Martín	2020	Peruvian Primera División	3	1	—		—		3	1
San Martín	2021	Peruvian Primera División	19	1	—		—		19	1
San Martín	Total		22	2	0	0	0	0	22	2
Sport Boys	2022	Peruvian Primera División	30	2	—		2	0	32	2
Atlético Grau	2023	Peruvian Primera División	19	0	—		—		19	0
Atlético Grau	2024	Peruvian Primera División	17	1	—		—		17	1
Atlético Grau	Total		36	1	0	0	0	0	36	1
Career total			90	5	2	0	2	0	94	5
