= Axel Moyano =

Peruvian footballer (born 2001)

Personal information
- Full name: Axel Aarón Moyano Durand
- Date of birth: 3 January 2001 (age 25)
- Place of birth: Lurigancho-Chosica, Peru
- Height: 1.72 m (5 ft 8 in)
- Position: Midfielder

Team information
- Current team: ADT
- Number: 8

Youth career
- Alianza Lima

Senior career*
Years	Team	Apps	(Gls)
2019–2024	Alianza Lima	23	(1)
2020	→ Alianza Universidad (loan)	14	(1)
2022	→ Univ. San Martín (loan)	30	(1)
2023	→ Atlético Grau (loan)	29	(0)
2025–	ADT	20	(0)

International career
2020	Peru U-20	2	(0)
2022	Peru U-23	1	(0)
- * Club domestic league appearances and goals as of 30 December 2025

Axel Aarón Moyano Durand (born 3 January 2001) is a Peruvian footballer who plays as a midfielder for Peruvian Primera División side ADT.

== Career ==
=== Club career ===
Moyano is a product of Alianza Lima and in March 2019, he signed his first professional contract with the club. To add some minutes on the pitch, Moyano was loaned out to Alianza Universidad at the end of January 2020. On 9 February 2020, Moyano got his professional debut for Alianza Universidad against FC Carlos Stein in the Peruvian Primera División. Moyano played the whole game, which Alianza won 1–0.

After returning from loan, Moyano got shirt number 14 for Alianza Lima and also got his official debut for the club on 17 May 2021 against Sport Boys. He made a total of 13 appearances in that season.

On 2 February 2022, Moyano was loaned out to Universidad San Martín until the end of the year. He got his official debut 10 days later, on 12 February 2022, against Universitario.

Ahead of the 2023 season, he joined Atlético Grau on a one-year loan.

In January 2025, Moyano moved to ADT.
