= Guillermo Enrique =

Argentine footballer

Personal information
- Full name: Guillermo Nicolás Enrique
- Date of birth: 24 February 2000 (age 26)
- Place of birth: Goya, Corrientes, Argentina
- Height: 1.74 m (5 ft 9 in)
- Position: Right-back

Team information
- Current team: Huracán de Goya

Youth career
- 2016–2021: Gimnasia LP

Senior career*
Years	Team	Apps	(Gls)
2021–2026	Gimnasia LP	69	(1)
2024	→ Banfield (loan)	5	(0)
2025	→ Alianza Lima (loan)	19	(1)
2026	Aldosivi	7	(0)
2026–	Huracán de Goya		
- * Club domestic league appearances and goals as of 17:47, 3 October 2026 (UTC)

Guillermo Nicolás Enrique (born 24 February 2000) is an Argentine professional footballer who plays as a right-back for Huracán de Goya.

== Career ==
Enrique joined the Gimnasia LP youth setup in 2016 and signed his first professional contract with the club on 15 September 2021. He became a regular in the first team the following season in 2022, playing 33 league games. He scored his first and only goal for Gimnasia on 30 January 2023 in a 3–1 defeat against Vélez Sarsfield.

In July 2024, he was loaned to fellow Liga Profesional side Banfield for a fee of $100,000, with an option to make the loan permanent for $600,000. He left Banfield after receiving few opportunities.

Ahead of the 2025 season, he moved abroad to join Liga 1 club Alianza Lima, coached by former Gimnasia manager Néstor Gorosito, on loan for a year with an option to buy. In January, he suffered a shoulder injury that kept him out of the qualification rounds for the Copa Libertadores. On 24 August, he was the man of the match in the clásico against Universitario, which ended 0–0. After the loan ended, he returned to Gimnasia where the termination of his contract was agreed by mutual consent.

In January 2026, he joined Aldosivi. He made his debut in a 0–0 draw against Barracas Central on 28 January.

== Career statistics ==
As of 7 February 2026

Appearances and goals by club, season and competition
Club	Season	League			Cup (Note: Includes Copa Argentina)		Continental		Other		Total	
Club	Season	Division	Goals	Apps	Apps	Goals	Apps	Goals	Apps	Goals	Apps	Goals
Gimnasia LP	2021	Liga Profesional	1	0	—		—		—		1	0
Gimnasia LP	2022	Liga Profesional	33	0	3	0	—		—		36	0
Gimnasia LP	2023	Liga Profesional	29	1	1	0	4 (Note: Appearances in Copa Sudamericana)	0	—		34	1
Gimnasia LP	2024	Liga Profesional	6	0	—		—		—		6	0
Gimnasia LP	Total		69	1	4	0	4	0	0	0	77	1
Banfield	2024	Liga Profesional	5	0	—		—		—		5	0
Alianza Lima	2025	Liga 1	19	1	—		16 (Note: Ten appearances in Copa Libertadores, six appearances in Copa Sudamericana)	0	—		35	1
Aldosivi	2026	Liga Profesional	1	0	—		—		—		1	0
Career total			94	2	4	0	20	0	0	0	118	2
