= Williams Alarcón =

Chilean footballer (born 2000)

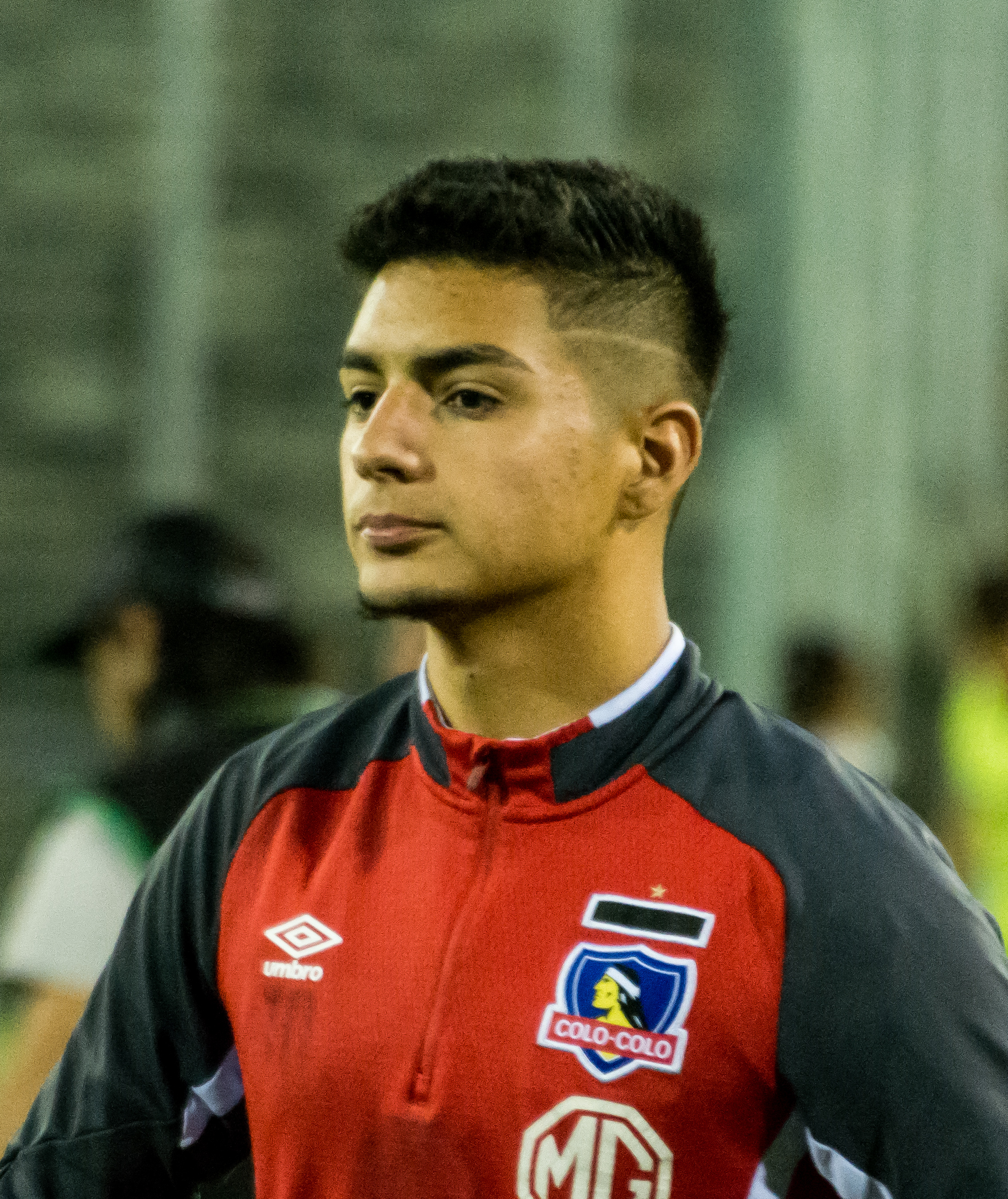
- Alarcón with Colo-Colo in 2020

Personal information
- Full name: Williams Héctor Alarcón Cepeda
- Date of birth: 29 November 2000 (age 25)
- Place of birth: Santiago, Chile
- Height: 1.76 m (5 ft 9 in)
- Position: Midfielder

Team information
- Current team: Boca Juniors
- Number: 15

Youth career
- Juanita Aguirre
- Colo-Colo

Senior career*
| Years | Team | Apps | (Gls) |
| 2018–2023 | Colo-Colo | 34 | (0) |
| 2021–2022 | → Unión La Calera (loan) | 33 | (5) |
| 2023 | Unión La Calera | 7 | (0) |
| 2023 | → Ibiza (loan) | 12 | (0) |
| 2023–2025 | Huracán | 50 | (5) |
| 2025– | Boca Juniors | 26 | (0) |

International career
| 2019 | Chile U23 | 3 | (0) |
| 2022–2024 | Chile | 7 | (0) |
- * Club domestic league appearances and goals as of 17:18, 16 June 2026 (UTC)

Williams Héctor Alarcón Cepeda (born 29 November 2000) is a Chilean footballer who plays as a midfielder for Argentine Primera División side Boca Juniors.

== Career ==
As a youth player, Alarcón was with club Juanita Aguirre from Conchalí, Santiago, before joining Colo-Colo, where he coincided with Rodrigo Ureña.

On 31 January 2023, Alarcón signed for Segunda División club Ibiza on loan from Unión La Calera until the end of the season with an option to buy.

Back to Unión La Calera, in August 2023 Alarcón signed with Argentine club Huracán until December 2026. In January 2025, he was transferred to Boca Juniors.

== International career ==
He represented Chile at under-23 level in the 2019 Toulon Tournament and the 1–0 win against Peru U23 on 31 August 2022, in the context of preparations for the 2023 Pan American Games.

At senior level, he made his debut in the friendly match against Morocco on 23 September 2022.

== Personal life ==
He is the son of former footballer Williams Alarcón who was also a product of Colo-Colo youth system.

In February 2026, Alarcón was granted Argentine citizenship.

== Career statistics ==
=== Club ===
As of match played 27 October 2025.

Appearances and goals by club, season and competition
| Club | Season | League | | | Cup | | Continental | | Other | | Total | |
| Club | Season | Division | Apps | Goals | Apps | Goals | Apps | Goals | Apps | Goals | Apps | Goals |
|---|---|---|---|---|---|---|---|---|---|---|---|---|
| Colo-Colo | 2018 | Chilean Primera División | 1 | 0 | 1 (Note: Appearances in the Copa Chile) | 0 | 0 | 0 | 0 | 0 | 2 | 0 |
| Colo-Colo | 2019 | Chilean Primera División | 11 | 0 | 0 | 0 | 2 (Note: Appearances in the Copa Sudamericana) | 0 | 0 | 0 | 13 | 0 |
| Colo-Colo | 2020 | Chilean Primera División | 18 | 0 | 0 | 0 | 2 | 0 | 1 (Note: Appearance in Supercopa de Chile) | 0 | 21 | 0 |
| Colo-Colo | 2021 | Chilean Primera División | 4 | 0 | 0 | 0 | 2 | 0 | 1 | 0 | 22 | 0 |
| Colo-Colo | Total | | 34 | 0 | 1 | 0 | 6 | 0 | 2 | 0 | 58 | 0 |
| Unión La Calera (loan) | 2021 | Chilean Primera División | 10 | 0 | 0 | 0 | 0 | 0 | — | | 10 | 0 |
| Unión La Calera (loan) | 2022 | Chilean Primera División | 23 | 3 | 0 | 0 | 8 | 0 | — | | 31 | 3 |
| Unión La Calera (loan) | Total | | 33 | 3 | 0 | 0 | 8 | 0 | 0 | 0 | 41 | 3 |
| Unión La Calera | 2023 | Chilean Primera División | 7 | 1 | 0 | 0 | 0 | 0 | 0 | 0 | 7 | 1 |
| Ibiza (loan) | 2022–23 | Segunda División | 12 | 0 | — | | — | | — | | 12 | 0 |
| Huracán | 2023 | Argentine Primera División | 13 | 0 | 0 | 0 | — | | — | | 13 | 0 |
| Huracán | 2024 | Argentine Primera División | 37 | 5 | 4 | 0 | — | | — | | 41 | 5 |
| Huracán | Total | | 50 | 5 | 4 | 0 | 0 | 0 | 0 | 0 | 54 | 5 |
| Boca Juniors | 2025 | Argentine Primera División | 21 | 0 | 1 | 0 | 2 (Note: Appearances in the Copa Libertadores) | 0 | 2 (Note: Appearances in the FIFA Club World Cup) | 0 | 26 | 0 |
| Career total | | | 157 | 9 | 6 | 0 | 16 | 0 | 4 | 0 | 183 | 11 |

=== International ===
Appearances and goals by national team and year
| National team | Year | Apps | Goals |
|---|---|---|---|
| Chile | 2022 | 2 | 0 |
| Chile | 2023 | 3 | 0 |
| Chile | 2024 | 2 | 0 |
| Total | | 7 | 0 |

== Honours ==
Boca Juniors

- Copa Sudamericana: 2026
- Argentine Primera División: 2026 Liga
