= Alan Velasco =

Argentine footballer (born 2002)

Personal information
- Full name: Alan Agustín Velasco
- Date of birth: 27 July 2002 (age 24)
- Place of birth: Quilmes, Argentina
- Height: 1.67 m (5 ft 6 in)
- Position: Winger

Team information
- Current team: Boca Juniors
- Number: 20

Youth career
- 2012–2019: Independiente

Senior career*
Years	Team	Apps	(Gls)
2019–2021	Independiente	48	(6)
2022–2024	FC Dallas	62	(12)
2025–	Boca Juniors	31	(3)

International career
2019	Argentina U17	5	(1)
- * Club domestic league appearances and goals as of 17:23, 16 June 2026 (UTC)

Alan Agustín Velasco (born 27 July 2002) is an Argentine professional footballer who plays as a winger for Argentine Primera División club Boca Juniors.

== Club career ==
Velasco started his career in the youth system of Independiente, having joined the club in 2012. He was promoted into their first-team, aged sixteen, towards the end of the 2018–19 campaign, with the winger initially appearing as an unused substitute for a Copa Sudamericana second stage encounter with Rionegro Águilas on 21 May 2019. He was again on the bench for the second leg on 28 May, with Velasco subsequently making his professional debut at the Estadio Libertadores de América; replacing Jony in added time. Sixteen appearances later, Velasco scored his first senior goal in the Sudamericana away to Fénix in Montevideo.

Velasco, aged eighteen, netted his opening domestic goals in the Copa de la Liga Profesional in November and December against Colón and Argentinos Juniors respectively. That was followed by a strike against Arsenal de Sarandí on 3 January and a brace away to River Plate on 9 January.

On February 1, 2022, Velasco was announced by FC Dallas as its costliest signing ever at that time in a four-year deal reported at $7 million with potentially an additional $1.7M based on incentives. Independiente will also receive 15% of his next sale.

== International career ==
Velasco represented Argentina at U15 and U17 level, scoring one goal in four appearances for the latter at the 2019 South American Championship in Peru; which they won. In October 2019, Velasco was called up for the 2019 FIFA U-17 World Cup in Brazil.

== Career statistics ==
As of match played 7 December 2025

Appearances and goals by club, season and competition
Club	Season	League			Cup (Note: Includes Copa Argentina, US Open Cup)		Continental		Other		Total	
Club	Season	Division	Apps	Goals	Apps	Goals	Apps	Goals	Apps	Goals	Apps	Goals
Independiente	2019–20	Primera División	4	0	1	0	4 (Note: Appearances in Copa Sudamericana)	0	1 (Note: Appearance in Copa de la Superliga)	0	10	0
Independiente	2020–21	Primera División	9	5	—		6	1	—		15	6
Independiente	2021	Primera División	35	1	1	0	8	1	—		44	2
Independiente	Total		48	6	2	0	18	2	—		69	8
FC Dallas	2022	MLS	26	6	2	0	—		2 (Note: Appearances in MLS Cup Playoffs)	1	30	7
FC Dallas	2023	MLS	28	4	1	0	—		5 (Note: Four appearances and two goals in Leagues Cup, one appearance in MLS Cup Playoffs)	2	34	6
FC Dallas	2024	MLS	8	2	0	0	—		0	0	8	2
FC Dallas	Total		62	12	3	0	—		7	3	72	15
Boca Juniors	2025	Primera División	25	1	1	0	2 (Note: Appearances in Copa Libertadores)	0	3 (Note: Appearances in FIFA Club World Cup)	0	31	1
Career total			135	19	6	0	20	2	11	3	172	24

== Honours ==
Boca Juniors

- Copa Sudamericana: 2026
- Argentine Primera División: 2026 Liga

Argentina U17

- South American U-17 Championship: 2019
