= Pablo Lavandeira =

Uruguayan footballer (born 1990)

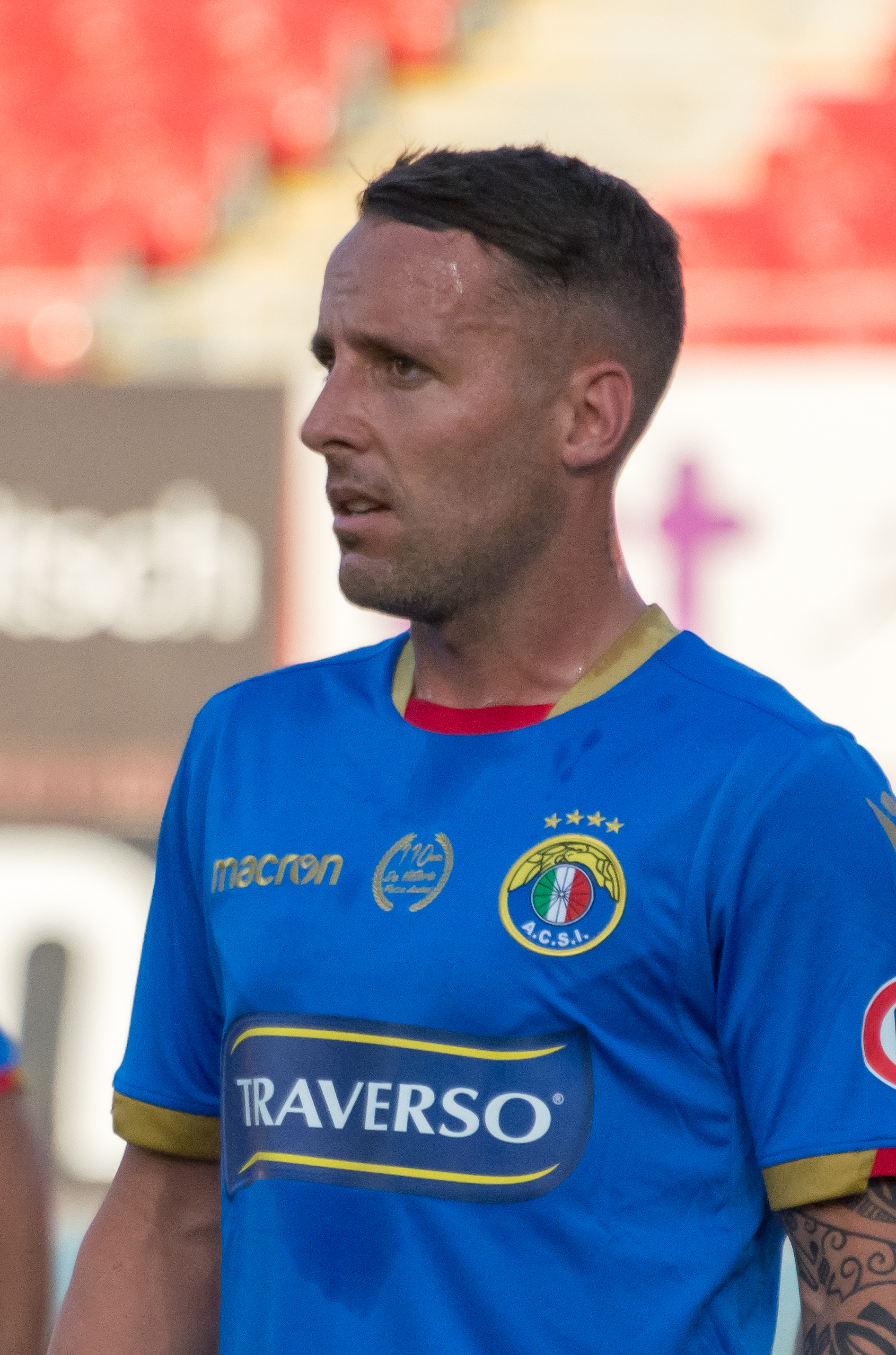
- Lavandeira playing for Audax Italiano in 2020

Personal information
- Full name: Pablo Damián Lavandeira Hernández
- Date of birth: 11 May 1990 (age 36)
- Place of birth: Canelones, Uruguay
- Height: 1.72 m (5 ft 8 in)
- Position: Attacking midfielder

Team information
- Current team: Atletico Grau
- Number: 19

Youth career
- Peñarol

Senior career*
| Years | Team | Apps | (Gls) |
| 2008–2010 | Peñarol | 0 | (0) |
| 2008 | → Tacuarembó (loan) | 14 | (1) |
| 2009 | → Progreso (loan) | 5 | (0) |
| 2010–2011 | Huracán | 20 | (8) |
| 2011 | Cerro Largo | 13 | (0) |
| 2012 | Antofagasta | 9 | (0) |
| 2013 | Progreso | 11 | (0) |
| 2013 | Montevideo Wanderers | 11 | (0) |
| 2014 | Atlético San Luis | 2 | (0) |
| 2014 | Villa Teresa | 11 | (4) |
| 2015 | UTC | 13 | (2) |
| 2016 | Deportivo Municipal | 46 | (9) |
| 2017 | Sport Rosario | 24 | (5) |
| 2017–2018 | Deportivo Municipal | 28 | (7) |
| 2018–2019 | Universitario | 31 | (4) |
| 2020 | Audax Italiano | 19 | (3) |
| 2021 | Ayacucho FC | 26 | (10) |
| 2022-2023 | Alianza Lima | 61 | (14) |
| 2023-2024 | FBC Melgar | 28 | (7) |
| 2025- | Club Alianza Lima | 7 | (1) |

International career
| 2007 | Uruguay U17 | 1 | (0) |
- * Club domestic league appearances and goals as of 29 December 2025

Pablo Damián Lavandeira Hernández (Spanish pronunciation: [ˈpaβlo ðaˈmjan laβanˈdejɾa eɾˈnandes], born 11 May 1990) is an Uruguayan footballer who currently plays for Atletico Grau as an attacking midfielder.
