= Milton Giménez =

Argentine footballer (born 1996)

Personal information
- Date of birth: 12 August 1996 (age 30)
- Place of birth: Grand Bourg, Argentina
- Height: 1.84 m (6 ft 0 in)
- Position: Striker

Team information
- Current team: Boca Juniors
- Number: 9

Youth career
- Deportivo Armenio
- Atlanta

Senior career*
Years	Team	Apps	(Gls)
2014–2021	Atlanta	48	(9)
2017	→ Ferrocarril Midland (loan)	20	(5)
2019–2020	→ Comunicaciones (loan)	25	(15)
2021	Central Córdoba SdE	33	(16)
2022–2023	Necaxa	38	(9)
2023	→ Banfield (loan)	35	(7)
2024	Banfield	18	(8)
2024–	Boca Juniors	54	(19)

International career
2016	Argentina U23		
- * Club domestic league appearances and goals as of 17:15, 16 June 2026 (UTC)

Milton Giménez (born 12 August 1996) is an Argentine professional footballer who plays as a striker for Argentine Primera División club Boca Juniors.

== Club career ==
Giménez started with Atlanta, having joined from Deportivo Armenio. He made three appearances off the bench across three seasons to start his career, one in each campaign; he featured as a substitute nine times in the subsequent 2016–17. Midway through that season, Giménez was loaned out to Primera C Metropolitana's Ferrocarril Midland. Five goals in twenty matches occurred. Back with Atlanta, Giménez played in fourteen fixtures in 2017–18 as well as scoring five – his first against Comunicaciones was followed by goals versus Almirante Brown, San Miguel, Talleres and Defensores de Belgrano.

In July 2019, after promotion to Primera B Nacional with Atlanta, Giménez completed a loan move to Comunicaciones of Primera B Metropolitana. He netted on his home debut versus San Miguel on 17 August. Fourteen further goals were scored by him in 2019–20, which included braces against Fénix, Sacachispas and Argentino. Giménez returned to Atlanta in June 2020, subsequently scoring three goals in eight games against Ferro Carril Oeste, Estudiantes and San Martín in the second tier. On 18 February 2021, Giménez moved up to the Primera División with Central Córdoba; penning a deal until December.

Giménez scored on his top-flight debut during a victory away from home against Atlético Tucumán on 22 February 2021. He followed that up with a goal in both his next two appearances versus San Lorenzo and Banfield, respectively.

== International career ==
Giménez represented Argentina's U23s at the 2016 Sait Nagjee Trophy in India.

== Career statistics ==
As of 6 March 2021

Appearances and goals by club, season and competition
Club	Season	League			Cup		League Cup		Continental		Other		Total	
Club	Season	Division	Apps	Goals	Apps	Goals	Apps	Goals	Apps	Goals	Apps	Goals	Apps	Goals
Atlanta	2014	Primera B Metropolitana	1	0	0	0	—		—		0	0	1	0
Atlanta	2015	Primera B Metropolitana	1	0	0	0	—		—		0	0	1	0
Atlanta	2016	Primera B Metropolitana	1	0	0	0	—		—		0	0	1	0
Atlanta	2016–17	Primera B Metropolitana	9	0	0	0	—		—		0	0	9	0
Atlanta	2017–18	Primera B Metropolitana	14	5	0	0	—		—		0	0	14	5
Atlanta	2018–19	Primera B Metropolitana	11	1	1	0	—		—		0	0	12	1
Atlanta	2019–20	Primera B Nacional	0	0	0	0	—		—		0	0	0	0
Atlanta	2020	Primera B Nacional	10	3	0	0	—		—		0	0	10	3
Atlanta	Total		47	9	1	0	—		—		0	0	48	9
Ferrocarril Midland (loan)	2016–17	Primera C Metropolitana	20	5	0	0	—		—		0	0	20	5
Comunicaciones (loan)	2019–20	Primera B Metropolitana	25	15	0	0	—		—		0	0	25	15
Central Córdoba	2021 (Note: Soccerway counts Copa de la Liga Profesional appearances as league appearances.)	Primera División	3	3	0	0	—		—		0	0	3	3
Career total			95	32	1	0	—		—		0	0	96	32

== Honours ==
Boca Juniors

- Copa Sudamericana: 2026
- Argentine Primera División: 2026 Liga
