= 2022 Club Atlético Boca Juniors season =

Boca Juniors
2022 season
- President: Jorge Amor Ameal
- Manager: Sebastián Battaglia (until 6 July); Hugo Ibarra (from 7 July)
- Stadium: Estadio Alberto J. Armando
- Primera División: Winners
- Copa de la Liga Profesional: Winners
- Copa Argentina: Semifinals
- Trofeo de Campeones de la Liga Profesional: Runner-Up
- 2022 Copa Libertadores: Round of 16
Home colours	Away colours	Third colours

The 2022 Club Atlético Boca Juniors season was the 94th consecutive season in the top flight of Argentine football. In addition to the domestic league, Boca Juniors participated in this season's editions of the Copa de la Liga Profesional, the Supercopa Argentina, the Copa Argentina and the 2022 Copa Libertadores.

== Season overview ==
=== November ===
Huracán activated their option to buy Franco Cristaldo permanently from his loan spell.

=== December ===
Gastón Ávila, Ramón Ábila, Walter Bou and Mateo Retegui returned from their respective loans. Edwin Cardona ended his loan with Boca and returned to his club.

=== January ===
Darío Benedetto rejoins the club after playing between 2016 and 2019, the forward arrives from Marseille. Walter Bou is transferred to Defensa y Justicia. Nicolás Figal arrives from Inter Miami. Lisandro López is transferred to Tijuana. Guillermo Fernández arrives from Cruz Azul. Agustín Obando is loaned to Tigre.

=== February ===
Goalkeeper Leandro Brey arrives from Los Andes. Mateo Retegui is loaned to Tigre. Ramón Ábila is transferred to Colón. On the first match of Copa de la Liga Profesional Boca drew 1–1 against Colón. On February 16 Boca defeated Aldosivi 2–1. Óscar Romero joins the club on a free transfer, he last played in San Lorenzo. On February 20 Boca defeated Rosario Central 2–1. On February 26 Boca drew 2–2 against Independiente.

=== March ===
On march 2 Boca defeated Central Córdoba (R) 4-1 and advanced to the Round of 32 of Copa Argentina. On march 6 Boca lost 0-1 against Huracán. On march 13 Boca defeated Estudiantes (LP) 1-0. On march 20 Boca defeated River 1-0 on the Superclásico.

=== April ===
On April 2 Boca drew 2-2 against Arsenal. On the first match of Copa Libertadores Boca lost 0-2 against Deportivo Cali. On April 9 Boca drew 0-0 against Vélez Sarsfield. On April 11 Boca defeated Bolivian Always Ready 2-0 in Copa Libertadores. On April 17 Boca drew 1-1 against Lanús. On April 20 Boca drew 1-1 against Godoy Cruz. On April 23 Boca defeated Central Córdoba (SdE) 2-1. On April 26 Boca lost 0-2 against Brazilian Corinthians in Copa Libertadores. On April 30 Boca defeated Barracas Central 2-0 and qualified to the final stages of 2022 Copa de la Liga Profesional.

=== May ===
On May 4 Boca defeated Bolivian Always Ready 2-0 in Copa Libertadores. On May 7 Boca defeated Tigre 2-0. On May 10 Boca defeated Defensa y Justicia 2-0 and advanced to the semifinals of Copa de la Liga Profesional. On May 14 Boca advanced to the final of Copa de la Liga Profesional after eliminating Racing on penalties. On May 17 Boca drew 1-1 against Brazilian Corinthians in Copa Libertadores. On May 22 Boca defeated Tigre 3-0, winning the Copa de la Liga Profesional and qualifying to 2023 Copa Libertadores. On May 26 Boca defeated Colombian Deportivo Cali 1-0 and qualified to the final stage of Copa Libertadores, facing Corinthians in Round of 16.

=== June ===
On the first match of 2022 Primera Division tournament, Boca defeated Arsenal 2-0. On June 8 Boca defeated Ferro Carril Oeste 1-0 and advanced to the Round of 16 of Copa Argentina. On June 12 Boca lost 0-1 against Central Córdoba (SdE). On June 15 Boca defeated Tigre 5-3. On June 15 Boca defeated Barracas Central 3-1. Gonzalo Maroni returns from Atlas and is again loaned to San Lorenzo. Gabriel Vega is loaned to Godoy Cruz. Vicente Taborda is loaned to Platense. On June 24 Boca lost 1-2 against Unión. On June 28 Boca drew 0-0 against Brazilian Corinthians in Copa Libertadores. Eros Mancuso, Cristian Pavón and Eduardo Salvio ended their contract with the club.

=== July ===
On July 1 Boca lost 0-3 against Banfield. After another 0-0 draw against Corinthians, Boca lost on penalties and was eliminated of Copa Libertadores. On July 7, Sebastián Battaglia is sacked and Hugo Ibarra is appointed as interim manager. On July 9 Boca lost 1-2 against San Lorenzo. Martín Payero is loaned from Middlesbrough. On July 16 Boca defeated Talleres (C) 1-0. Facundo Roncaglia rejoins the club after playing between 2007 and 2012, the defender arrives on a free transfer from Aris Limassol. On July 19 Boca lost 0-2 against Argentinos Juniors. Gastón Ávila is transferred to Antwerp. On July 24 Boca defeated Estudiantes (LP) 3-1. Carlos Izquierdoz is transferred to Sporting Gijón. On July 31 Boca lost 0-3 against Patronato.

=== August ===
On August 6 Boca defeated Platense 2-1. Goalkeeper Sergio Romero arrives on a free transfer from Venezia. On August 10 Boca defeated Agropecuario Argentino 1-0 and advanced to the Quarterfinals of Copa Argentina. On August 14 Boca drew 0-0 against Racing. On August 17 Boca drew 0-0 against Rosario Central. On August 21 Boca defeated Defensa y Justicia 1-0. On August 21 Boca defeated Atlético Tucumán 2-1.

=== September ===
On September 4 Boca defeated Colón 2-1. Jorman Campuzano is loaned to Giresunspor. On September 11 Boca defeated River 1-0, winning the Superclásico. On September 14 Boca defeated Lanús 1-0. On September 19 Boca drew 0-0 against Huracán. On September 23 Boca defeated Godoy Cruz 1-0. On September 28 Boca defeated Quilmes 3-2 and advanced to the Semifinals of Copa Argentina.

=== October ===
On October 2 Boca defeated Vélez Sarsfield 1-0. On October 9 Boca defeated Aldosivi 2-1. On October 12 Boca defeated Sarmiento (J) 1-0. On October 16 Boca lost 0-2 against Newell's Old Boys. On October 20 Boca defeated Gimnasia y Esgrima (LP) 2-1. On October 23 Boca drew 2-2 against Independiente, winning their 35th title of Primera División. On October 26 Boca lost on penalties against Patronato, being eliminated of Copa Argentina.

=== November ===
On November 6 Boca lost 1-2 against Racing in the Trofeo de Campeones.

== Squad ==
Last updated on November 6, 2022.

Squad no.	Name	Nationality	Position	Date of birth (age)	Apps	Goals	Last team	Note
Goalkeepers
1	Agustín Rossi	(Argentina)	GK	August 21, 1995 (age 31)	151	-110	(Argentina) Lanús	
12	Leandro Brey	(Argentina)	GK	September 21, 2002 (age 24)	1	0	(Argentina) Los Andes	
13	Javier García	(Argentina)	GK	January 29, 1987 (age 39)	61	-74	(Argentina) Racing	
25	Sergio Romero	(Argentina)	GK	February 22, 1987 (age 39)	0	0	(Italy) Venezia	
Defenders
2	Facundo Roncaglia	(Argentina)	DF	February 10, 1987 (age 39)	102	6	(Cyprus) Aris Limassol	
3	Agustín Sández	(Argentina)	DF	January 16, 2001 (age 25)	32	1	(Argentina) Youth team	
4	Nicolás Figal	(Argentina)	DF	April 3, 1994 (age 32)	26	0	(United States) Inter Miami	
5	Carlos Zambrano	(Peru)	DF	July 10, 1989 (age 37)	62	2	(Ukraine) Dynamo Kyiv	
6	Marcos Rojo (C)	(Argentina)	DF	March 20, 1990 (age 36)	59	6	(England) Manchester United	Injured
17	Luis Advíncula	(Peru)	DF	March 2, 1990 (age 36)	61	1	(Spain) Rayo Vallecano	
18	Frank Fabra (VC 3º)	(Colombia)	DF	February 22, 1991 (age 35)	187	15	(Colombia) Independiente Medellín	
19	Valentín Barco	(Argentina)	DF	July 23, 2004 (age 22)	3	0	(Argentina) Youth team	
35	Nahuel Génez	(Argentina)	DF	June 18, 2003 (age 23)	2	0	(Argentina) Youth team	
39	Gabriel Aranda	(Argentina)	DF	April 16, 2001 (age 25)	15	0	(Argentina) Youth team	
57	Marcelo Weigandt	(Argentina)	DF	April 6, 2001 (age 25)	40	1	(Argentina) Gimnasia y Esgrima (LP)	
Midfielders
8	Guillermo Fernández (VC 2º)	(Argentina)	MF	October 11, 1991 (age 34)	97	8	(Mexico) Cruz Azul	
10	Óscar Romero	(Paraguay)	MF	July 4, 1992 (age 34)	45	2	(Argentina) San Lorenzo	
11	Martín Payero	(Argentina)	MF	September 11, 1998 (age 28)	17	1	(England) Middlesbrough	
14	Esteban Rolón	(Argentina)	MF	March 25, 1995 (age 31)	26	0	(Argentina) Huracán	
16	Aaron Molinas	(Argentina)	MF	August 2, 2000 (age 26)	47	0	(Argentina) Youth team	
20	Juan Ramírez	(Argentina)	MF	May 25, 1993 (age 33)	67	2	(Argentina) San Lorenzo	
23	Diego González	(Argentina)	MF	February 9, 1988 (age 38)	37	3	(Argentina) Racing Club	
32	Agustín Almendra	(Argentina)	MF	February 11, 2000 (age 26)	69	6	(Argentina) Youth team	
33	Alan Varela (VC 4º)	(Argentina)	MF	July 4, 2001 (age 25)	77	1	(Argentina) Youth team	
34	Pedro Velurtas	(Argentina)	MF	June 26, 2001 (age 25)	1	0	(Argentina) Youth team	
36	Cristian Medina	(Argentina)	MF	June 1, 2002 (age 24)	80	1	(Argentina) Youth team	
46	Simón Rivero	(Argentina)	MF	April 16, 2003 (age 23)	2	0	(Argentina) Youth team	
Forwards
7	Exequiel Zeballos	(Argentina)	FW	April 24, 2002 (age 24)	46	5	(Argentina) Youth team	Injured
9	Darío Benedetto	(Argentina)	FW	May 17, 1990 (age 36)	117	61	(France) Olympique de Marseille	
22	Sebastián Villa	(Colombia)	FW	May 19, 1996 (age 30)	147	28	(Colombia) Deportes Tolima	
27	Nicolás Orsini	(Argentina)	FW	September 12, 1994 (age 32)	32	3	(Argentina) Lanús	
28	Gonzalo Morales	(Argentina)	FW	April 4, 2003 (age 23)	7	2	(Argentina) Youth team	
29	Norberto Briasco	(Armenia)	FW	February 29, 1996 (age 30)	26	3	(Argentina) Huracán	
31	Brandon Cortés	(Argentina)	FW	June 26, 2001 (age 25)	4	0	Universidad de Chile	
38	Luis Vázquez	(Argentina)	FW	January 14, 2001 (age 25)	79	12	(Argentina) Youth team	
41	Luca Langoni	(Argentina)	FW	February 9, 2002 (age 24)	21	7	(Argentina) Youth team	
43	Maximiliano Zalazar	(Argentina)	FW	March 8, 2001 (age 25)	2	0	(Argentina) Youth team	

== Transfers ==
=== Summer ===
==== In ====
Players transferred
Pos.	Name	Club	Fee
GK	(Argentina) Leandro Brey	(Argentina) Los Andes	Undisclosed
DF	(Argentina) Nicolás Figal	(United States) Inter Miami	Undisclosed
MF	(Argentina) Guillermo Fernández	(Mexico) Cruz Azul	Undisclosed
MF	(Paraguay) Óscar Romero	(Argentina) San Lorenzo	Free
FW	(Argentina) Darío Benedetto	(France) Marseille	Undisclosed

Players loaned
Pos.	Name	Club	End date

Loan Return
Pos.	Name	Return from
DF	(Argentina) Gastón Ávila	(Argentina) Rosario Central
FW	(Argentina) Ramón Ábila	(United States) D.C. United
FW	(Argentina) Walter Bou	(Argentina) Defensa y Justicia
FW	(Argentina) Mateo Retegui	(Argentina) Talleres (C)

==== Out ====
Players transferred
Pos.	Name	Club	Fee
DF	(Argentina) Lisandro López	(Mexico) Tijuana	Undisclosed
MF	(Argentina) Franco Cristaldo	(Argentina) Huracán	Undisclosed
FW	(Argentina) Ramón Ábila	(Argentina) Colón	Undisclosed
FW	(Argentina) Walter Bou	(Argentina) Defensa y Justicia	Undisclosed

Players loaned
Pos.	Name	Club	End date
FW	(Argentina) Agustín Obando	(Argentina) Tigre	December 2023
FW	(Argentina) Mateo Retegui	(Argentina) Tigre	December 2023

Loan return
Pos.	Name	Return to
MF	(Colombia) Edwin Cardona	(Mexico) Tijuana

=== Winter ===
==== In ====
Players transferred
Pos.	Name	Club	Fee
DF	(Argentina) Facundo Roncaglia	(Cyprus) Aris Limassol	Free
GK	(Argentina) Sergio Romero		

Players loaned
Pos.	Name	Club	End date
MF	(Argentina) Martín Payero	(England) Middlesbrough	June 2023

Loan Return
Pos.	Name	Return from
MF	(Argentina) Gonzalo Maroni	(Mexico) Atlas

==== Out ====
Players transferred
Pos.	Name	Club	Fee
DF	(Argentina) Gastón Ávila	(Belgium) Antwerp	Undisclosed
DF	(Argentina) Carlos Izquierdoz	(Spain) Sporting Gijón	Undisclosed
DF	(Argentina) Eros Mancuso	(Argentina) Estudiantes (LP)	Free
MF	(Argentina) Eduardo Salvio	(Mexico) Pumas UNAM	Free
FW	(Argentina) Cristian Pavón	(Brazil) Atlético Mineiro	Free

Players loaned
Pos.	Name	Club	End date
MF	(Colombia) Jorman Campuzano	(Turkey) Giresunspor	June 2023
MF	(Argentina) Gonzalo Maroni	(Argentina) San Lorenzo	December 2023
MF	(Argentina) Gabriel Vega	(Argentina) Godoy Cruz	December 2023
FW	(Argentina) Vicente Taborda	(Argentina) Platense	December 2023

Loan return
Pos.	Name	Return to

== Competitions ==
=== Overall ===
Competition	First match	Last match	Starting round	Final position	Record							
Competition	First match	Last match	Starting round	Final position	Pld	W	D	L	GF	GA	GD	Win %
Primera División	June 5, 2022	October 23, 2022	Matchday 1	Winners	27	16	4	7	34	28	+6	59.26
Copa de la Liga Profesional	February 13, 2022	May 22, 2022	Group stage	Winners	17	9	7	1	24	11	+13	52.94
2021–22 Copa Argentina	March 2, 2022	October 26, 2022	Round of 64	Semi-finals	5	4	1	0	10	4	+6	80.00
Trofeo de Campeones	November 6, 2022		Final	Runners-up	1	0	0	1	1	2	−1	0.00
2022 Copa Libertadores	April 5, 2022	July 5, 2022	Group stage	Round of 16	8	3	3	2	5	5	+0	37.50
Total					58	32	15	11	74	50	+24	55.17

Last updated: November 6, 2022.
Source: Competitions

=== Primera División ===
==== League table ====
Pos	Team	Pld	W	D	L	GF	GA	GD	Pts	Qualification
1	Boca Juniors (C)	27	16	4	7	34	28	+6	52	Qualification for Copa Libertadores group stage
2	Racing	27	14	8	5	41	24	+17	50	
3	River Plate	27	14	5	8	43	22	+21	47	
4	Huracán	27	12	11	4	35	21	+14	47	
5	Atlético Tucumán	27	12	10	5	32	22	+10	46	

Source: AFA
Rules for classification: 1) points; 2) play-off (only if needed to decide championship); 3) goal difference; 4) goals scored; 5) head-to-head points; 6) head-to-head goal difference; 7) head-to-head goals scored.
(C) Champions

==== International Qualification ====
Pos	Team	Pld	W	D	L	GF	GA	GD	Pts	Qualification
1	Racing	41	22	14	5	66	34	+32	80	Qualification for Copa Libertadores group stage (Note: Boca Juniors qualified for the Copa Libertadores group stage by winning the 2022 Argentine Primera División. As Boca Juniors also won the 2022 Copa de la Liga Profesional, Racing (best team in the aggregate table) earned the Copa de la Liga Profesional berth.)
2	Boca Juniors	41	23	10	8	53	39	+14	79	Qualification for Copa Libertadores group stage
3	River Plate	41	23	7	11	74	34	+40	76	Qualification for Copa Libertadores group stage
4	Argentinos Juniors	41	19	10	12	54	40	+14	67	Qualification for Copa Libertadores group stage
5	Huracán	41	17	14	10	52	40	+12	65	Qualification for Copa Libertadores second stage

Source: AFA
Rules for classification: 1) points; 2) goal difference; 3) goals scored; 4) head-to-head points; 5) head-to-head goal difference; 6) head-to-head goals scored.

==== Relegation table ====
Pos	Team	2019–20 Pts	2021 Pts	2022 Pts	Total Pts	Total Pld	Avg	Relegation
1	River Plate	47	75	76	198	103	1.922	
2	Boca Juniors	51	63	79	193	103	1.874	
3	Racing	42	53	80	175	103	1.699	

==== Results summary ====
Overall								Home						Away					
Pld	W	D	L	GF	GA	GD	Pts	W	D	L	GF	GA	GD	W	D	L	GF	GA	GD
27	16	4	7	34	28	+6	52	9	3	2	22	15	+7	7	1	5	12	13	−1

Source: AFA

==== Results by round ====
Round	1	2	3	4	5	6	7	8	9	10	11	12	13	14	15	16	17	18	19	20	21	22	23	24	25	26	27
Ground	H	A	H	A	H	H	A	H	A	H	A	H	A	H	A	H	A	H	A	H	A	H	A	H	A	A	H
Result	W	L	W	W	L	L	L	W	L	W	L	W	D	D	W	W	W	W	W	D	W	W	W	W	W	L	D
Position	4	10	4	2	4	11	14	11	15	11	13	11	11	13	10	6	5	4	3	3	2	1	2	1	1	1	1

Source: AFA
A = Away; H = Home; W = Win; D = Draw; L = Loss

==== Matches ====
Win Draw Loss Postponed

June 5, 2022 1	Boca Juniors	2–1	Arsenal	Buenos Aires
19:00 UTC−3	Sández 14'; Villa 16'; Rolón (yellow card) 88'; Ramírez (yellow card) 90+5'	Report	Pittón 27'; Picco (yellow card) 40'; Miloc (yellow card) 75'	Stadium: La Bombonera; Referee: Fernando Espinoza

June 12, 2022 2	Central Córdoba (SdE)	1–0	Boca Juniors	Santiago del Estero
20:30 UTC−3	González Metilli 11' (yellow card) 67'; López (penalty missed) 63'; Kalinski (yellow card) 72'; Toselli (yellow card) 90+2'	Report		Stadium: Único Madre de Ciudades; Referee: Pablo Echavarría

June 15, 2022 3	Boca Juniors	5–3	Tigre	Buenos Aires
21:30 UTC−3	Benedetto 10', 76'; Fernández (yellow card) 48'; Zeballos 53', 73' (yellow card) 75'; Demartini 56' (o.g.); Weigandt (yellow card) 79'; Fabra (yellow card) 90'	Report	Figal 34' (o.g.); Retegui 65', 88' (pen.); Sosa (yellow card) 75'; Blondel (yellow card) 81'	Stadium: La Bombonera; Referee: Jorge Baliño

June 19, 2022 4	Barracas Central	1–3	Boca Juniors	Buenos Aires
20:30 UTC−3	Glaby (yellow card) 23' (yellow-red card) 59'; Bandiera 41'; Tapia (yellow card) 57'; Arce (yellow card) 90'; Paz (yellow card) 90+1'; Rincón (yellow card) 90+1'	Report	Benedetto (yellow card) 6'; Rojo (yellow card) 9'; Villa 45+1'; Fernández 58'; Advíncula (yellow card) 62'; Zeballos 67' (yellow card) 90+1'; Vázquez (yellow card) 90+1'	Stadium: Tomás Adolfo Ducó; Referee: Patricio Loustau

June 24, 2022 5	Boca Juniors	1–2	Unión	Buenos Aires
21:30 UTC−3	Salvio 39' (pen.); Izquierdoz (yellow card) 73' (yellow-red card) 90+9'; Fabra (yellow card) 90+9'; Zambrano (yellow card) 90+11'	Report	Juárez 24' (pen.); Moyano (yellow card) 85'; Troyansky 90+14' (pen.) (yellow card) 90+15'; Brítez (yellow card) 90+14'	Stadium: La Bombonera; Referee: Yael Falcón Pérez

July 1, 2022 6	Boca Juniors	0–3	Banfield	Buenos Aires
21:30 UTC−3	Molinas (yellow card) 16'; Sández (yellow card) 24'; Orsini (yellow card) 62'	Report	Galoppo 20'; Enrique 33', 37'; Cabrera (yellow card) 66'; Domingo (yellow card) 78'	Stadium: La Bombonera; Referee: Darío Herrera

July 9, 2022 7	San Lorenzo	2–1	Boca Juniors	Buenos Aires
15:30 UTC−3	Giay 37'; Rosane (yellow card) 45+4'; Fernández Mercau (yellow card) 45+4'; Bareiro 53' (penalty missed) 75'; Gattoni (yellow card) 72'	Report	Fabra (yellow card) 22'; Rojo 27' (yellow card) 73'; Varela (yellow card) 52'; Zambrano (yellow card) 61'	Stadium: Pedro Bidegain; Referee: Fernando Espinoza

July 16, 2022 8	Boca Juniors	1–0	Talleres (C)	Buenos Aires
20:30 UTC−3	Benedetto (penalty missed) 6'; Ramírez (yellow card) 26'; Fernández (yellow card) 42'; Advíncula (yellow card) 70'; Rojo 78' (pen.); Zeballos (yellow card) 90+3'	Report	Franco (yellow card) 70'; Pérez (yellow card) 71' (yellow-red card) 77'; Díaz (yellow card) 73'	Stadium: La Bombonera; Referee: Pablo Dóvalo

July 19, 2022 9	Argentinos Juniors	2–0	Boca Juniors	Buenos Aires
21:30 UTC−3	Carabajal 22'; Verón 41'; Minissale (yellow card) 90+1'	Report	Fernández (yellow card) 45+1'; Zambrano (yellow card) 79'; Benedetto (yellow card) 89'	Stadium: Diego Armando Maradona; Referee: Fernando Rapallini

July 24, 2022 10	Boca Juniors	3–1	Estudiantes (LP)	Buenos Aires
20:30 UTC−3	Fabra (yellow card) 2'; Fernández 10' (yellow card) 19'; Zambrano (yellow card) 45+4'; Rojo 57'; Villa 67'; Payero (yellow card) 85'	Report	Morel (yellow card) 27' (goal) 75'; Castro (yellow card) 57'	Stadium: La Bombonera; Referee: Hernán Mastrángelo

July 31, 2022 11	Patronato	3–0	Boca Juniors	Paraná
18:00 UTC−3	Rodríguez 24'; Sosa 39'; Leys (yellow card) 45'; Acevedo 79' (yellow card) 84'	Report	Varela (yellow card) 77'	Stadium: Presbítero Bartolomé Grella; Referee: Facundo Tello

August 6, 2022 12	Boca Juniors	2–1	Platense	Buenos Aires
20:30 UTC−3	Romero 11', 42'; Sández (yellow card) 52'; Advíncula (yellow card) 58'; Villa (yellow card) 84'; Medina (yellow card) 90+3'	Report	Pignani (yellow card) 19'; Morgantini 54'; Suso (yellow card) 67'; Villalba (yellow card) 82'; González (yellow card) 82' (yellow-red card) 82'; Ledesma (yellow card) 82'	Stadium: La Bombonera; Referee: Yael Falcón Pérez

August 14, 2022 13	Racing	0–0	Boca Juniors	Avellaneda
20:30 UTC−3	Insúa (yellow card) 17'; Hauche (yellow card) 32'; Gómez (yellow card) 76'; Mura (yellow card) 90+1'; Moreno (yellow card) 90+2'	Report	Varela (yellow card) 10'; Benedetto (yellow card) 52'	Stadium: Presidente Juan Domingo Perón; Referee: Fernando Rapallini

August 17, 2022 14	Boca Juniors	0–0	Rosario Central	Buenos Aires
21:30 UTC−3	Advíncula (yellow card) 11'; Fabra (yellow card) 90+9'; Fernández (penalty missed) 45+8'; Varela (yellow card) 54'	Report	Servio (penalty missed) 14'; Véliz (yellow card) 73'	Stadium: La Bombonera; Referee: Pablo Echavarría

August 21, 2022 15	Defensa y Justicia	0–1	Boca Juniors	Florencio Varela
20:30 UTC−3	Unsain (yellow card) 80'	Report	Sández (yellow card) 24'; Figal (yellow card) 37'; Vázquez 90+1'	Stadium: Norberto Tomaghello; Referee: Silvio Trucco

August 28, 2022 16	Boca Juniors	2–1	Atlético Tucumán	Buenos Aires
18:00 UTC−3	Advíncula (yellow card) 28'; Zambrano (yellow card) 45+1'; Langoni 76', 86' (yellow card) 87'; Fernández (yellow card) 78'; Varela (yellow card) 90+2'	Report	Lotti 16'; Garay (yellow card) 51'; Acosta (yellow card) 89'; Thaller (yellow card) 90'	Stadium: La Bombonera; Referee: Fernando Espinoza

September 4, 2022 17	Colón	1–2	Boca Juniors	Santa Fe
18:00 UTC−3	Rodríguez 39' (pen.); Delgado (yellow card) 42'	Report	Briasco 10' (yellow card) 24'; Rolón (yellow card) 19'; Rojo (yellow card) 20'; Payero (yellow card) 43'; Langoni 73'	Stadium: Brigadier General Estanislao López; Referee: Hernán Mastrángelo

September 11, 2022 18	Boca Juniors	1–0	River Plate	Buenos Aires
17:00 UTC−3	Fabra (yellow card) 41'; Rojo (yellow card) 57' (red card) 90+6'; Advíncula (yellow card) 60'; Fernández (yellow card) 62'; Benedetto 64'; Ramírez (yellow card) 72'; Vázquez (yellow card) 85'	Report	De La Cruz (yellow card) 39'; Díaz (yellow card) 56'; Casco (yellow card) 62'; Borja (yellow card) 90'; Pinola (yellow card) 90+5'	Stadium: La Bombonera; Referee: Darío Herrera

September 14, 2022 19	Lanús	0–1	Boca Juniors	Lanús
21:30 UTC−3	Belmonte (yellow card) 68'	Report	Fabra (yellow card) 36'; Figal (yellow card) 66'; Advíncula (yellow card) 73'; Zambrano (yellow card) 86'; Benedetto 89'; Rossi (yellow card) 90'	Stadium: Ciudad de Lanús; Referee: Facundo Tello

September 19, 2022 20	Boca Juniors	0–0	Huracán	Buenos Aires
19:00 UTC−3	Molinas (yellow card) 32'; Roncaglia (yellow card) 38'; Langoni (yellow card) 69'; Fabra (yellow card) 76'; Fernández (yellow card) 81'	Report	Soto (yellow card) 45'; Garré (yellow card) 50'; Hezze (yellow card) 65'; Merolla (yellow card) 74'	Stadium: La Bombonera; Referee: Yael Falcón Pérez

September 25, 2022 21	Godoy Cruz	0–1	Boca Juniors	Mendoza
19:00 UTC−3	Barrios (yellow card) 67'; Canale (yellow card) 86'; Ojeda (yellow card) 87'	Report	Fernández (yellow card) 38'; Langoni 39'; Zalazar (yellow card) 74'; Sández (yellow card) 87'; Rolón (yellow card) 89'; Aranda (yellow card) 90+5'	Stadium: Malvinas Argentinas; Referee: Pablo Echavarría

October 2, 2022 22	Boca Juniors	1–0	Vélez Sarsfield	Buenos Aires
18:00 UTC−3	Varela (yellow card) 29'; Fernández (yellow card) 37'; Morales 78'; Vázquez (red card) 89'; Fabra (yellow card) 90+5'	Report	Jara (yellow card) 19'; Ortega (red card) 88'; Gómez (red card) 89'; Castro (yellow card) 90+5' de los Santos (yellow card) 90+5'; Mulet (yellow card) 90+6'	Stadium: La Bombonera; Referee: Patricio Loustau

October 9, 2022 24	Boca Juniors	2–1	Aldosivi	Buenos Aires
18:00 UTC−3	Payero 10'; Varela (yellow card) 15'; Romero (yellow card) 18'; Benedetto 45+4'; Rivero (yellow card) 90+4'	Report	Valentini 15'; Pisano (yellow card) 30'; Meli (yellow card) 40'; Silva (yellow card) 90+2'; Brítez (yellow card) 90+2'	Stadium: La Bombonera; Referee: Silvio Trucco

October 12, 2022 25	Sarmiento (J)	0–1	Boca Juniors	Junín
16:30 UTC−3	Torres (yellow card) 87'	Report	Rojo (penalty missed) 24'; Medina (yellow card) 39'; Langoni 45'; Zambrano (yellow card) 72'; Vázquez (yellow card) 82'; Romero (yellow card) 87'	Stadium: Eva Perón; Referee: Facundo Tello

October 16, 2022 26	Newell's Old Boys	2–0	Boca Juniors	Rosario
15:30 UTC−3	Sforza (yellow card) 12' (red card) 35'; Lema (yellow card) 37'; García 46'; Luciano (yellow card) 68'; Ditta 79' (yellow card) 81'; Portillo (yellow card) 85'	Report	Zambrano (yellow card) 10'; Benedetto (yellow card) 82'	Stadium: Marcelo Bielsa; Referee: Patricio Loustau

October 19, 2022 23	Gimnasia y Esgrima (LP)	1–2	Boca Juniors	La Plata
21:30 UTC−3	Morales 38'; Piris (yellow card) 70'; Sosa (yellow card) 83'	Report	Fabra 38'; Langoni 65'; Zambrano (yellow card) 70'; Romero (yellow card) 84'	Stadium: Juan Carmelo Zerillo; Referee: Hernán Mastrángelo
Note: The game was delayed after 9 minutes and later suspended by referee Hernán Mastrángelo due to lack of guarantees due to incidents outside the stadium, and was completed on October 19.

October 23, 2022 27	Boca Juniors	2–2	Independiente	Buenos Aires
17:00 UTC−3	Fabra (yellow card) 9'; Fernández (yellow card) 15' (goal) 33'; Advíncula (yellow card) 45'; Vázquez (yellow card) 46'; Villa 49'	Report	Fernández (yellow card) 13' (goal) 32' (pen.); Elizalde (yellow card) 33'; L. Romero (yellow card) 54'; Benegas (yellow card) 66'; Laso (yellow card) 67'; Vallejo 80'; Vigo (yellow card) 90+2'	Stadium: La Bombonera; Referee: Darío Herrera

=== Copa de la Liga Profesional ===
==== Group stage ====
===== Zone 2 =====
Pos	Team	Pld	W	D	L	GF	GA	GD	Pts	Qualification
1	Estudiantes (LP)	14	8	4	2	33	20	+13	28	Advance to Quarter-finals
2	Boca Juniors	14	7	6	1	19	11	+8	27	Advance to Quarter-finals
3	Tigre	14	5	5	4	17	12	+5	20	Advance to Quarter-finals
4	Aldosivi	14	6	2	6	17	16	+1	20	Advance to Quarter-finals
5	Barracas Central	14	6	1	7	17	24	−7	19	
6	Vélez Sarsfield	14	4	6	4	13	12	+1	18	
7	Huracán	14	5	3	6	17	19	−2	18	
8	Arsenal	14	3	8	3	20	19	+1	17	
9	Colón	14	3	7	4	18	19	−1	16	
10	Independiente	14	3	7	4	17	18	−1	16	
11	Godoy Cruz	14	3	7	4	21	24	−3	16	
12	Lanús	14	3	6	5	17	18	−1	15	
13	Central Córdoba (SdE)	14	3	6	5	17	23	−6	15	
14	Rosario Central	14	4	2	8	16	20	−4	14	

Source: AFA

====== Matches ======
Win Draw Loss Postponed

February 13, 2022 1	Boca Juniors	1–1	Colón	Buenos Aires
21:30 UTC−3	Benedetto 22'; Fabra (yellow card) 84'	Report	Lertora (yellow card) 29'; Sandoval (yellow card) 54'; Garcés (yellow card) 68'; Beltrán 85'	Stadium: La Bombonera; Referee: Fernando Echenique

February 16, 2022 2	Aldosivi	1–2	Boca Juniors	Mar del Plata
19:15 UTC−3	Román (yellow card) 36'; Cauteruccio 90+1'	Report	Villa 15', 49'	Stadium: José María Minella; Referee: Patricio Loustau

February 20, 2022 3	Boca Juniors	2–1	Rosario Central	Buenos Aires
19:15 UTC−3	García (yellow card) 45+2'; Villa (yellow card) 45+2'; Izquierdoz 49'; Fernández (yellow card) 68'; Rossi (yellow card) 68'; Molinas (yellow card) 72'; Fabra 80'	Report	Montoya (yellow card) 20'; Vecchio (penalty missed) 24'; Ruben (yellow card) 31'; Báez (yellow card) 58'; Tanlongo (yellow card) 65'; Martínez Dupuy 85'	Stadium: José Amalfitani Stadium
Note: The match was played at José Amalfitani Stadium instead due to poor pitch conditions in Boca's home stadium, La Bombonera.

February 26, 2022 4	Independiente	2–2	Boca Juniors	Buenos Aires
21:30 UTC−3	Insaurralde (yellow card) 19'; Romero (yellow card) 21'; Togni 30'; Benavídez (yellow card) 58'; Soñora 79'	Report	Fabra (yellow card) 13' (yellow-red card) 69'; Benedetto 16' (pen.), 44'; Rojo (yellow card) 21'; Villa (yellow card) 45+1'; Zeballos (yellow card) 90+26'; Advíncula (yellow card) 90+27'	Stadium: Libertadores de América; Referee: Facundo Tello
Note: The match was temporarily suspended between 88' and 90+21' due to waterlogged pitch.

March 6, 2022 5	Boca Juniors	0–1	Huracán	Buenos Aires
19:15 UTC−3	Izquierdoz (yellow card) 21'; Fernández (yellow card) 78'; Zeballos (yellow card) 83'	Report	Cabral (yellow card) 27'; Cóccaro (yellow card) 30' (goal) 69'; Tobio (yellow card) 65'; Díaz (yellow card) 66'; Cristaldo (yellow card) 77'	Stadium: La Bombonera; Referee: Nicolás Lamolina

March 13, 2022 6	Estudiantes (LP)	0–1	Boca Juniors	La Plata
21:30 UTC−3	Godoy (yellow card) 7'; Díaz (penalty missed) 42'; Morel (yellow card) 44'	Report	Molinas (yellow card) 15'; Fabra (yellow card) 40'; Advíncula (yellow card) 42' (goal) 53'; Rojo (yellow card) 49'; Fernández (yellow card) 67'; Orsini (yellow card) 88'	Stadium: Jorge Luis Hirschi; Referee: Fernando Echenique

March 20, 2022 7	River Plate	0–1	Boca Juniors	Buenos Aires
19:00 UTC−3	Pérez (yellow card) 27'	Report	Advíncula (yellow card) 31'; Ramírez (yellow card) 42'; Villa 53'; Zambrano (yellow card) 65'; Figal (yellow card) 79'	Stadium: Monumental Antonio Vespucio Liberti; Referee: Darío Herrera

April 2, 2022 8	Boca Juniors	2–2	Arsenal	Buenos Aires
21:30 UTC−3	Vázquez 34'; Molinas (yellow card) 56'; Rojo 74' (pen.)	Report	Lomonaco 61'; Suárez (yellow card) 72'; Colmán 75'	Stadium: La Bombonera; Referee: Leandro Rey Hilfer

April 9, 2022 9	Vélez Sarsfield	0–0	Boca Juniors	Buenos Aires
21:30 UTC−3	Perrone (yellow card) 21'	Report	Rojo (yellow card) 37'	Stadium: José Amalfitani Stadium; Referee: Patricio Loustau

April 17, 2022 10	Boca Juniors	1–1	Lanús	Buenos Aires
19:00 UTC−3	Villa 5'; Rojo (yellow card) 49'; Campuzano (yellow card) 53'; Vázquez (yellow card) 90+3'	Report	Sand 26'; Acosta (yellow card) 34'; Di Plácido (yellow card) 49'; Pérez (yellow card) 55'; Pasquini (yellow card) 73'; Spinelli (yellow card) 88'; Braghieri (yellow card) 90+3'	Stadium: La Bombonera; Referee: Facundo Tello

April 20, 2022 11	Boca Juniors	1–1	Godoy Cruz	Buenos Aires
21:30 UTC−3	Benedetto 33' (pen.)	Report	Bullaude (yellow card) 21'; Rodríguez 43'; Ramírez (yellow card) 45+1'	Stadium: La Bombonera; Referee: Hernán Mastrángelo

April 23, 2022 12	Central Córdoba (SdE)	1–2	Boca Juniors	Santiago del Estero
19:00 UTC−3	López (penalty missed) 21' 45' (pen.) (yellow card) 55'; Bustos (yellow card) 88'; Bay (yellow card) 90+3'	Report	Salvio 2', 83'; González (yellow card) 48'; Rojo (yellow card) 55'	Stadium: Alfredo Terrera; Referee: Yael Falcón Pérez

April 30, 2022 13	Boca Juniors	2–0	Barracas Central	Buenos Aires
19:00 UTC−3	Benedetto 4', 60' (yellow card) 53'; Varela (yellow card) 48'; Fernández (yellow card) 76'	Report	Ferreyra (yellow card) 90+4'	Stadium: La Bombonera; Referee: Fernando Espinoza

May 7, 2022 14	Tigre	0–2	Boca Juniors	Victoria
16:30 UTC−3	Fernández (yellow card) 3'; Luciatti (yellow card) 26'; Blondel (yellow card) 38'; Prieto (yellow card) 67'	Report	Benedetto 44' (yellow card) 46'; Vázquez 64'; Campuzano (yellow card) 90+1'	Stadium: José Dellagiovanna; Referee: Pablo Echavarría

==== Quarterfinals ====
May 10, 2022	Boca Juniors	2–0	Defensa y Justicia	Buenos Aires
21:30 UTC−3	Advíncula (yellow card) 14'; Villa (yellow card) 33' (goal) 40'; Ramírez 77'	Report	Tripichio (yellow card) 71'	Stadium: La Bombonera; Referee: Andrés Merlos

==== Semifinals ====
May 14, 2022	Boca Juniors	0–0 (6–5 p)	Racing	Lanús
17:00 UTC−3	Zambrano (yellow card) 19'; Rojo (yellow card) 23'; Romero (yellow card) 45+1'; Fabra (yellow card) 86'; Fernández (yellow card) 90+1'	Report	Alcaraz (yellow card) 24'; Moreno (yellow card) 30'; Mura (yellow card) 51'; Sigali (yellow card) 78'	Stadium: Ciudad de Lanús; Referee: Facundo Tello
	Penalties
	Rojo (penalty scored); Izquierdoz (penalty scored); Fernández (penalty scored); Benedetto (penalty scored); Salvio (penalty missed); Villa (penalty scored); Varela (penalty scored)		(penalty scored) Piovi; (penalty scored) Cardona; (penalty scored) Chancalay; (penalty scored) Alcaraz; (penalty missed) Copetti; (penalty scored) Correa; (penalty missed) Insúa

==== Final ====
May 22, 2022	Boca Juniors	3–0	Tigre	Córdoba
16:00 UTC−3	Romero (yellow card) 22'; Rojo 45+3'; Fabra 67'; Vázquez 85'	Report	Cabrera (yellow card) 33'; Prieto (yellow card) 47'; Blondel (yellow card) 88'	Stadium: Mario Alberto Kempes; Referee: Darío Herrera

=== Copa Argentina ===
==== Round of 64 ====
March 2, 2022	Boca Juniors	4–1	Central Córdoba (R)	Córdoba
21:10 UTC−3	Orsini 13', 66'; Mancuso (yellow card) 27'; Vázquez 79'; Zeballos 90+4' (pen.)	Report	Di Vanni 26' (yellow card) 31'; Gómez (yellow card) 40'; Alegre (yellow card) 71'	Stadium: Mario Alberto Kempes; Referee: Jorge Baliño

==== Round of 32 ====
June 8, 2022	Ferro Carril Oeste	0–1	Boca Juniors	La Rioja
16:00 UTC−3	Mosca (yellow card) 11'	Report	Fernández (yellow card) 45'; Fabra (yellow card) 74'; Villa 78'	Stadium: Carlos Augusto Mercado Luna; Referee: Hernán Mastrángelo

==== Round of 16 ====
August 10, 2022	Agropecuario Argentino	0–1	Boca Juniors	Salta
21:10 UTC−3	Leyendeker (red card) 8'; Callegari (yellow card) 8'; Pereira (yellow card) 18'; Melo (yellow card) 85'	Report	Fernández 25'; Benedetto (yellow card) 90'	Stadium: Padre Ernesto Martearena; Referee: Maximiliano Ramírez

==== Quarterfinals ====
September 28, 2022	Boca Juniors	3–2	Quilmes	Mendoza
22:00 UTC−3	Benedetto 7'; Morales 34'; Langoni 59'	Report	Bonetto 4'; Barrios (yellow card) 40'; Pavone 64'; Colman (yellow card) 90+7'	Stadium: Malvinas Argentinas; Referee: Ariel Penel
Note: The game was stopped at 65 minutes due to incidents caused by Quilmes fans, it was resumed at 83 minutes.

==== Semifinals ====
October 26, 2022	Patronato	1–1 (3–2 p)	Boca Juniors	San Juan
21:30 UTC−3	Kruspzky (yellow card) 14'; Guasone (yellow card) 28'; Estigarribia 32'; Cobos (yellow card) 50'; Quintana (yellow card) 72'; Leys (yellow card) 79'; Ojeda (yellow card) 82'	Report	Villa 73' (pen.)	Stadium: Estadio del Bicentenario
	Penalties
	Acevedo (penalty scored); Estigarribia (penalty scored); Giani (penalty missed); Cobos (penalty scored)		(penalty missed) Romero; (penalty scored) Langoni; (penalty missed) Varela; (penalty scored) Sández; (penalty missed) Villa

=== Trofeo de Campeones ===
November 6, 2022	Boca Juniors	1–2 (a.e.t.)	Racing	Villa Mercedes
17:30 UTC−3	Briasco 18'; Fernández (yellow card) 39'; Varela (yellow card) 71' (yellow-red card) 99'; Villa (red card) 90+4'; Advíncula (red card) 120+4'; González (red card) 120+4'; Zambrano (red card) 120+4'; Fabra (yellow card) 110' (yellow-red card) 120+8'; Benedetto (yellow card) 110' (yellow-red card) 120+9'	Report	Rojas 22'; Hauche (yellow card) 26'; Mena (yellow card) 33'; Mura (yellow card) 72'; Miranda (yellow card) 76'; Sigali (yellow card) 82'; Carbonero (red card) 90+4'; Alcaraz (yellow card) 112' (goal) 117' (red card) 120+4'; Galván (red card) 120+5'	Stadium: Estadio Único; Referee: Facundo Tello

=== Copa Libertadores ===
==== Group stage ====
Pos	Team	Pld	W	D	L	GF	GA	GD	Pts	Qualification	BOC	COR	CAL	CAR
1	(Argentina) Boca Juniors	6	3	1	2	5	5	0	10	Round of 16	—	1–1	1–0	2–0
2	(Brazil) Corinthians	6	2	3	1	5	4	+1	9	Round of 16	2–0	—	1–0	1–1
3	(Colombia) Deportivo Cali	6	2	2	2	7	4	+3	8	Copa Sudamericana	2–0	0–0	—	3–0
4	(Bolivia) Always Ready	6	1	2	3	5	9	−4	5		0–1	2–0	2–2	—

Source: CONMEBOL

April 5, 2022 1	Deportivo Cali (Colombia)	2–0	(Argentina) Boca Juniors	Palmira, Colombia
19:30 UTC−5	Marsiglia (yellow card) 28'; Burdisso (yellow card) 37' (goal) 70'; Vásquez 80'	Report	Benedetto (yellow card) 45+1'; Medina (yellow card) 69'; Campuzano (yellow card) 90'	Stadium: Estadio Deportivo Cali; Referee: Jesús Valenzuela (Venezuela)

April 12, 2022 2	Boca Juniors (Argentina)	2–0	(Bolivia) Always Ready	Buenos Aires, Argentina
19:15 UTC−3	Benedetto 25', 90+6' (yellow card) 45+1'; Ávila (yellow card) 45'	Report	Ramallo (red card) 45'; Arce (yellow card) 45+2'; Cabrera (yellow card) 53'	Stadium: La Bombonera; Referee: Gustavo Tejera (Uruguay)

April 26, 2022 3	Corinthians (Brazil)	2–0	(Argentina) Boca Juniors	São Paulo, Brazil
21:30 UTC−3	Maycon 5', 78'; Fagner (yellow card) 32'; Renato Augusto (yellow card) 33'; Du Queiroz (yellow card) 36'; Raul Gustavo (yellow card) 37'; João Victor (yellow card) 63'	Report	Medina (yellow card) 37'; Benedetto (yellow card) 63'; Fabra (yellow card) 74'; Aranda (yellow card) 86'	Stadium: Arena Corinthians; Referee: Andrés Matonte (Uruguay)

May 4, 2022 4	Always Ready (Bolivia)	0–1	(Argentina) Boca Juniors	La Paz, Bolivia
20:00 UTC−4	Arce (yellow card) 34'; Cortés (red card) 86'; Chumacero (yellow card) 90+4'	Report	Salvio 37' (pen.); Romero (yellow card) 41'; García (yellow card) 49'; Fabra (yellow card) 63'; Rossi (yellow card) 64'	Stadium: Estadio Hernando Siles; Referee: Kevin Ortega (Peru)

May 17, 2022 5	Boca Juniors (Argentina)	1–1	(Brazil) Corinthians	Buenos Aires, Argentina
21:30 UTC−3	Benedetto 42' (yellow card) 67'; Varela (yellow card) 63'	Report	Du Queiroz 16'; Jô (yellow card) 22'; Robson Bambu (yellow card) 47'; Renato Augusto (yellow card) 60'; Gustavo Mantuan (yellow card) 65'; Raul Gustavo (yellow card) 67'; Cantillo (red card) 70'	Stadium: La Bombonera; Referee: Christian Ferreyra (Uruguay)

May 26, 2022 6	Boca Juniors (Argentina)	1–0	(Colombia) Deportivo Cali	Buenos Aires, Argentina
21:00 UTC−3	Fabra (yellow card) 20'; Varela 54'; Figal (yellow card) 56'; Izquierdoz (yellow card) 81'; Medina (yellow card) 89'	Report	Congo (yellow card) 38'; Camargo (yellow card) 45'; Vásquez (yellow card) 48'; Gutiérrez (yellow card) 49'	Stadium: La Bombonera; Referee: Piero Maza (Chile)

==== Final Stages ====
June 28, 2022 First leg	Corinthians (Brazil)	0–0	(Argentina) Boca Juniors	São Paulo, Brazil
21:30 UTC−3	Róger Guedes (penalty missed) 43'; Roni (yellow card) 46'; Lucas Piton (yellow card) 62'; João Victor (yellow card) 68'	Report	Rojo (yellow card) 40'; Villa (yellow card) 44'; Varela (yellow card) 81'	Stadium: Arena Corinthians; Referee: Roberto Tobar (Chile)

July 5, 2022 Second leg	Boca Juniors (Argentina)	0–0 (0–0 agg.) (5–6 p)	(Brazil) Corinthians	Buenos Aires, Argentina
21:30 UTC−3	Benedetto (penalty missed) 43'; Varela (yellow card) 47'	Report	Raul Gustavo (yellow card) 29'; Gil (yellow card) 59'	Stadium: La Bombonera; Referee: Andrés Matonte (Uruguay)
	Penalties
	Rojo (penalty scored); Izquierdoz (penalty scored); Villa (penalty missed); Fernández (penalty scored); Benedetto (penalty missed); Romero (penalty scored); Varela (penalty scored); Ramírez (penalty missed)		(penalty scored) Fábio Santos; (penalty scored) Cantillo; (penalty missed) Raul Gustavo; (penalty missed) Bruno Melo; (penalty scored) Róger Guedes; (penalty scored) Roni; (penalty scored) Piton; (penalty scored) Gil

== Team statistics ==
	Total	Home	Away	Neutral
Games played	58	26	24	8
Games won	32	14	13	5
Games drawn	15	9	4	2
Games lost	11	3	7	1
Biggest win	4-1 vs Central Córdoba (R)	2-0 vs Barracas Central	2-0 vs Tigre	3-0 vs Tigre
Biggest loss	0-3 vs Banfield	0-3 vs Banfield	0-3 vs Patronato	
Biggest win (Primera División)	5-3 vs Tigre	5-3 vs Tigre	3-1 vs Barracas Central	None
Biggest win (Copa de la Liga Profesional)	2-0 vs Barracas Central	2-0 vs Barracas Central	2-0 vs Tigre	3-0 vs Tigre
Biggest win (Copa Argentina)	4-1 vs Central Córdoba (R)	None		4-1 vs Central Córdoba (R)
Biggest win (Trofeo de Campeones)	None			
Biggest win (Copa Libertadores)	2-0 vs Always Ready	2-0 vs Always Ready	1-0 vs Always Ready	None
Biggest loss (Primera División)	0-3 vs Banfield	0-3 vs Banfield	0-3 vs Patronato	None
Biggest loss (Copa de la Liga Profesional)	0-1 vs Huracán	0-1 vs Huracán	None	None
Biggest loss (Copa Argentina)	None			
Biggest loss (Trofeo de Campeones)	None			1-2 vs Racing
Biggest loss (Copa Libertadores)	0-2 vs Deportivo Cali	None	0-2 vs Deportivo Cali	None
Clean sheets	24	10	10	4
Goals scored	74	37	23	14
Goals conceded	50	23	21	6
Goal difference	+24	+14	+2	+8
Yellow cards	172	81	74	17
Red cards	11	3	1	7
Top scorer	Benedetto (16)	Benedetto (11)	Villa; Langoni; Benedetto (4)	Orsini; Villa; Vázquez (2)
Penalties for	12	7	3	2
Penalties against	12	6	6	

=== Season Appearances and goals ===
As of November 6, 2022

No.	Pos	Nat	Player	Total		Primera División		Copa Prof		Copa Argentina		Trofeo de Campeones		Copa Libertadores	
No.	Pos	Nat	Player	Apps	Goals	Apps	Goals	Apps	Goals	Apps	Goals	Apps	Goals	Apps	Goals
Goalkeepers
1	GK	(Argentina) ARG	Agustín Rossi	46	-35	24	-22	13	-8	1	0	1	-2	7	-3
12	GK	(Argentina) ARG	Leandro Brey	1	0	0	0	0	0	0	0	0	0	0+1	0
13	GK	(Argentina) ARG	Javier García	12	-15	3	-6	4	-3	4	-4	0	0	1	-2
25	GK	(Argentina) ARG	Sergio Romero	0	0	0	0	0	0	0	0	0	0	0	0
Defenders
2	DF	(Argentina) ARG	Facundo Roncaglia	14	0	8+3	0	0	0	3	0	0	0	0	0
3	DF	(Argentina) ARG	Agustín Sández	17	1	6+2	1	4+1	0	2	0	0+1	0	1	0
4	DF	(Argentina) ARG	Nicolás Figal	26	0	10+3	0	2+4	0	3	0	1	0	2+1	0
5	DF	(Peru) PER	Carlos Zambrano	27	0	14+2	0	5+1	0	0	0	1	0	4	0
6	DF	(Argentina) ARG	Marcos Rojo	29	5	11	3	15	2	0	0	0	0	3	0
17	DF	(Peru) PER	Luis Advíncula	43	1	20	0	14	1	1	0	1	0	7	0
18	DF	(Colombia) COL	Frank Fabra	47	3	22	1	13+1	2	3	0	1	0	7	0
19	DF	(Argentina) ARG	Valentín Barco	0	0	0	0	0	0	0	0	0	0	0	0
35	DF	(Argentina) ARG	Nahuel Génez	1	0	0	0	0	0	0+1	0	0	0	0	0
39	DF	(Argentina) ARG	Gabriel Aranda	13	0	5	0	4	0	2	0	0	0	2	0
57	DF	(Argentina) ARG	Marcelo Weigandt	15	0	6+2	0	2+1	0	3+1	0	0	0	0	0
Midfielder
8	MF	(Argentina) ARG	Guillermo Fernández	50	4	21+3	3	14	0	4	1	1	0	7	0
10	MF	(Paraguay) PAR	Óscar Romero	44	2	17+4	2	7+3	0	3+1	0	0+1	0	8	0
11	MF	(Argentina) ARG	Martín Payero	17	1	8+7	1	0	0	2	0	0	0	0	0
14	MF	(Argentina) ARG	Esteban Rolón	12	0	4+3	0	1+1	0	3	0	0	0	0	0
16	MF	(Argentina) ARG	Aaron Molinas	27	0	5+9	0	6+5	0	0+2	0	0	0	0	0
20	MF	(Argentina) ARG	Juan Ramírez	47	1	12+8	0	9+7	1	1+2	0	1	0	4+3	0
23	MF	(Argentina) ARG	Diego González	7	0	0+1	0	3+3	0	0	0	0	0	0	0
32	MF	(Argentina) ARG	Agustín Almendra	2	0	0	0	0+2	0	0	0	0	0	0	0
33	MF	(Argentina) ARG	Alan Varela	42	1	21+1	0	5+3	0	2+2	0	1	0	5+2	1
34	MF	(Argentina) ARG	Pedro Velurtas	1	0	0	0	0	0	0+1	0	0	0	0	0
36	MF	(Argentina) ARG	Cristian Medina	41	0	8+10	0	5+7	0	2+3	0	0+1	0	2+3	0
46	MF	(Argentina) ARG	Simón Rivero	2	0	0+2	0	0	0	0	0	0	0	0	0
Forwards
7	FW	(Argentina) ARG	Exequiel Zeballos	29	4	5+5	3	2+6	0	2+1	1	0	0	6+2	0
9	FW	(Argentina) ARG	Darío Benedetto	41	16	14+3	5	13+1	7	1+1	1	0+1	0	6+1	3
22	FW	(Colombia) COL	Sebastián Villa	41	11	13+5	4	17	5	2+1	2	1	0	2	0
27	FW	(Argentina) ARG	Nicolás Orsini	22	2	3+7	0	1+5	0	3+1	2	0	0	0+2	0
28	FW	(Argentina) ARG	Gonzalo Morales	7	2	0+5	1	0	0	1+1	1	0	0	0	0
29	FW	(Armenia) ARM	Norberto Briasco	6	2	2+2	1	0	0	1	0	1	1	0	0
31	FW	(Argentina) ARG	Brandon Cortés	2	0	0+2	0	0	0	0	0	0	0	0	0
38	FW	(Argentina) ARG	Luis Vázquez	47	5	13+11	1	4+10	3	1+2	1	1	0	2+3	0
41	FW	(Argentina) ARG	Luca Langoni	21	7	11+7	6	0	0	0+2	1	0+1	0	0	0
43	FW	(Argentina) ARG	Maximiliano Zalazar	2	0	0+2	0	0	0	0	0	0	0	0	0
Players who have made an appearance or had a squad number this season, but have left the club
24	DF	(Argentina) ARG	Carlos Izquierdoz	19	1	3+2	0	8+1	1	1	0	0	0	4	0
25	DF	(Argentina) ARG	Gastón Ávila	7	0	1	0	1+2	0	1	0	0	0	2	0
40	DF	(Argentina) ARG	Eros Mancuso	1	0	0	0	0	0	1	0	0	0	0	0
10	MF	(Argentina) ARG	Eduardo Salvio	19	4	1	1	7+4	2	1	0	0	0	5+1	1
21	MF	(Colombia) COL	Jorman Campuzano	16	0	2+1	0	6+4	0	0	0	0	0	1+2	0
35	MF	(Argentina) ARG	Gabriel Vega	3	0	0	0	1	0	1+1	0	0	0	0	0
28	FW	(Argentina) ARG	Vicente Taborda	2	0	0+1	0	0	0	0+1	0	0	0	0	0
31	FW	(Argentina) ARG	Cristian Pavón	0	0	0	0	0	0	0	0	0	0	0	0

=== Top scorers ===
As of November 6, 2022

Rank	Pos.	No.	Name	Primera División	Copa Prof	Copa Argentina	Trofeo de Campeones	Copa Libertadores	Total
1	FW	9	(Argentina) Darío Benedetto	5	7	1		3	16
2	FW	22	(Colombia) Sebastián Villa	4	5	2			11
3	FW	41	(Argentina) Luca Langoni	6		1			7
4	DF	6	(Argentina) Marcos Rojo	3	2				5
5	FW	38	(Argentina) Luis Vázquez	1	3	1			5
6	FW	7	(Argentina) Exequiel Zeballos	3		1			4
7	MF	10	(Argentina) Eduardo Salvio	1	2			1	4
8	MF	8	(Argentina) Guillermo Fernández	3		1			4
9	DF	18	(Colombia) Frank Fabra	1	2				3
10	FW	27	(Argentina) Nicolás Orsini			2			2
11	MF	11	(Paraguay) Óscar Romero	2					2
12	FW	28	(Argentina) Gonzalo Morales	1		1			2
13	FW	29	(Armenia) Norberto Briasco	1			1		2
14	DF	24	(Argentina) Carlos Izquierdoz		1				1
15	DF	17	(Peru) Luis Advíncula		1				1
16	MF	20	(Argentina) Juan Ramírez		1				1
17	MF	33	(Argentina) Alan Varela					1	1
18	DF	3	(Argentina) Agustín Sández	1					1
19	MF	11	(Argentina) Martín Payero	1					1
Own goals				1					1
Total				34	24	10	1	5	74

=== Top assists ===
As of November 6, 2022

Rank	Pos.	No.	Name	Primera División	Copa Prof	Copa Argentina	Trofeo de Campeones	Copa Libertadores	Total
1	FW	22	(Colombia) Sebastián Villa	7	8				15
2	MF	11	(Paraguay) Óscar Romero	3	2	3		1	9
3	DF	18	(Colombia) Frank Fabra	4	2		1		7
4	MF	8	(Argentina) Guillermo Fernández	1	1	1			3
5	FW	7	(Argentina) Exequiel Zeballos	1				1	2
6	MF	16	(Argentina) Aaron Molinas	1	1				2
7	FW	38	(Argentina) Luis Vázquez	2					2
8	MF	36	(Argentina) Cristian Medina		1	1			2
9	MF	33	(Argentina) Alan Varela	1	1				2
10	FW	9	(Argentina) Darío Benedetto	1	1				2
11	MF	21	(Colombia) Jorman Campuzano		1				1
12	DF	5	(Peru) Carlos Zambrano					1	1
13	DF	3	(Argentina) Agustín Sández			1			1
14	FW	41	(Argentina) Luca Langoni	1					1
Total				22	18	6	1	3	50

=== Penalties ===
Date	Penalty Taker	Scored	Opponent	Competition
26 February 2022	Darío Benedetto	Yes	Independiente	Copa de la Liga Profesional
2 March 2022	Exequiel Zeballos	Yes	Central Córdoba (R)	Copa Argentina
2 April 2022	Marcos Rojo	Yes	Arsenal	Copa de la Liga Profesional
20 April 2022	Darío Benedetto	Yes	Godoy Cruz	Copa de la Liga Profesional
4 May 2022	Eduardo Salvio	Yes	Always Ready	Copa Libertadores
24 June 2022	Eduardo Salvio	Yes	Unión	Primera División
5 July 2022	Darío Benedetto	No	Corinthians	Copa Libertadores
16 July 2022	Darío Benedetto	No	Talleres (C)	Primera División
16 July 2022	Marcos Rojo	Yes	Talleres (C)	Primera División
17 August 2022	Guillermo Fernández	No	Rosario Central	Primera División
12 October 2022	Marcos Rojo	No	Sarmiento (J)	Primera División
26 October 2022	Sebastián Villa	Yes	Patronato	Copa Argentina

=== Clean sheets ===
As of November 6, 2022

Rank	Pos.	No.	Name	Primera División	Copa Prof	Copa Argentina	Trofeo de Campeones	Copa Libertadores	Total
1	GK	1	(Argentina) Agustín Rossi	10	7	1		5	23
2	GK	13	(Argentina) Javier García		1	1			2
3	GK	12	(Argentina) Leandro Brey					1	1
Total				10	8	2		5	25

=== Disciplinary record ===
As of November 6, 2022

No.	Pos	Nat	Name	Primera División			Copa Profesional			Copa Argentina			Trofeo de Campeones			Copa Libertadores			Total		
No.	Pos	Nat	Name	Booked	(yellow card) (yellow-red card)	Sent off (straight red)	Booked	(yellow card) (yellow-red card)	Sent off (straight red)	Booked	(yellow card) (yellow-red card)	Sent off (straight red)	Booked	(yellow card) (yellow-red card)	Sent off (straight red)	Booked	(yellow card) (yellow-red card)	Sent off (straight red)	Booked	(yellow card) (yellow-red card)	Sent off (straight red)
Goalkeepers
1	GK	(Argentina)	Agustín Rossi	1			1									1			3		
12	GK	(Argentina)	Leandro Brey																		
13	GK	(Argentina)	Javier García				1									1			2		
25	GK	(Argentina)	Sergio Romero																		
Defenders
2	DF	(Argentina)	Facundo Roncaglia	1															1		
3	DF	(Argentina)	Agustín Sández	4															4		
4	DF	(Argentina)	Nicolás Figal	2			1									1			4		
5	DF	(Peru)	Carlos Zambrano	9			2								1				11		1
6	DF	(Argentina)	Marcos Rojo	4		1	6									1			11		1
17	DF	(Peru)	Luis Advíncula	8			4								1				12		1
18	DF	(Colombia)	Frank Fabra	10			4	1		1				1		3			18	2	
19	DF	(Argentina)	Valentín Barco																		
39	DF	(Argentina)	Gabriel Aranda	1												1			2		
57	DF	(Argentina)	Marcelo Weigandt	1															1		
Midfielders
8	MF	(Argentina)	Guillermo Fernández	10			5			1			1						17		
10	MF	(Paraguay)	Óscar Romero	3			2									1			6		
11	MF	(Argentina)	Martín Payero	2															2		
14	MF	(Argentina)	Esteban Rolón	3															3		
16	MF	(Argentina)	Aaron Molinas	2			3												5		
20	MF	(Argentina)	Juan Ramírez	3			1												4		
23	MF	(Argentina)	Diego González				1								1				1		1
32	MF	(Argentina)	Agustín Almendra																		
33	MF	(Argentina)	Alan Varela	7			1							1		3			11	1	
34	MF	(Argentina)	Pedro Velurtas																		
36	MF	(Argentina)	Cristian Medina	2												3			5		
46	MF	(Argentina)	Simón Rivero	1															1		
Forwards
7	FW	(Argentina)	Exequiel Zeballos	3			2												5		
9	FW	(Argentina)	Darío Benedetto	4			2			1				1		4			11	1	
22	FW	(Colombia)	Sebastián Villa	1			3								1	1			5		1
27	FW	(Argentina)	Nicolás Orsini	1			1												2		
28	FW	(Argentina)	Gonzalo Morales																		
29	FW	(Armenia)	Norberto Briasco	1															1		
38	FW	(Argentina)	Luis Vázquez	4		1	1												5		1
41	FW	(Argentina)	Luca Langoni	2															2		
43	FW	(Argentina)	Maximiliano Zalazar	1															1		
Players who have made an appearance or had a squad number this season, but have left the club
24	DF	(Argentina)	Carlos Izquierdoz	1	1		1									1			3	1	
25	DF	(Argentina)	Gastón Ávila													1			1		
40	DF	(Argentina)	Eros Mancuso							1									1		
10	MF	(Argentina)	Eduardo Salvio																		
21	MF	(Colombia)	Jorman Campuzano				2									1			3		
35	MF	(Argentina)	Gabriel Vega																		
28	FW	(Argentina)	Vicente Taborda																		
31	FW	(Argentina)	Cristian Pavón																		
Total				92	1	2	44	1		4			1	3	4	23			164	5	6
