= 2022 Copa de la Liga Profesional final =

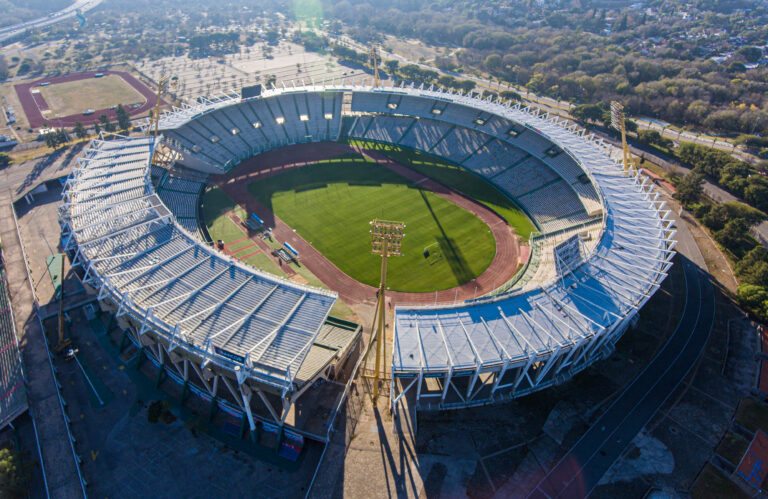
- Estadio Mario Alberto Kempes, venue
- Event: 2022 Copa de la Liga Profesional
Boca Juniors	Tigre
3	0
- Date: 22 May 2022
- Venue: Mario Alberto Kempes, Córdoba
- Man of the Match: Frank Fabra (Boca Juniors)
- Referee: Darío Herrera
- Attendance: 60,000

The 2022 Copa de la Liga Profesional final was the final match of the 2022 Copa de la Liga Profesional, the third edition of this national cup. It was held in the Estadio Mario Alberto Kempes in Córdoba on 22 May 2022 between Boca Juniors and Tigre.

Unlike most of the Argentine football matches, supporters from both clubs were allowed to attend the Estadio Mario Alberto Kempes. It was expected near 60,000 people attended the match.

Boca Juniors won their second title after they defeated Tigre 3–0 in the final. As champions, Boca Juniors qualified for the 2023 Copa Libertadores and the 2022 Trofeo de Campeones.

== Qualified teams ==
Team	Previous finals app.
Boca Juniors	**2020**
Tigre	None

Bold indicates winning years

== Road to the final ==
Note: In all results below, the score of the finalist is given first (H: home; A: away; N: neutral venue).

Boca Juniors		Round	Tigre	
Opponent	Result	Group stage	Opponent	Result
Colón	1–1 (H)	Matchday 1	Godoy Cruz	1–1 (A)
Aldosivi	2–1 (A)	Matchday 2	Central Córdoba (SdE)	1–1 (H)
Rosario Central	2–1 (H)	Matchday 3	Barracas Central	2–0 (A)
Independiente	2–2 (A)	Matchday 4	Lanús	0–0 (A)
Huracán	0–1 (H)	Matchday 5	Colón	1–0 (H)
Estudiantes (LP)	1–0 (A)	Matchday 6	Aldosivi	1–0 (H)
River Plate	1–0 (A)	Matchday 7	Platense	4–0 (H)
Arsenal	2–2 (H)	Matchday 8	Rosario Central	2–0 (H)
Vélez Sarsfield	0–0 (A)	Matchday 9	Independiente	1–1 (A)
Lanús	1–1 (H)	Matchday 10	Huracán	2–1 (H)
Godoy Cruz	1–1 (H)	Matchday 11	Estudiantes (LP)	1–2 (A)
Central Córdoba (SdE)	2–1 (A)	Matchday 12	Arsenal	0–0 (H)
Barracas Central	2–0 (H)	Matchday 13	Vélez Sarsfield	2–3 (A)
Tigre	2–0 (A)	Matchday 14	Boca Juniors	0–2 (H)
**Zone B final standings**
Pos / Team / Pld / W / D / L / GF / GA / GD / Pts / Qualification; 1 / Estudiantes LP / 14 / 8 / 4 / 2 / 33 / 20 / +13 / **28** / Advance to Quarter-finals; 2 / Boca Juniors / 14 / 7 / 6 / 1 / 19 / 11 / +8 / **27** / Advance to Quarter-finals; 3 / Tigre / 14 / 5 / 5 / 4 / 17 / 12 / +5 / **20** / Advance to Quarter-finals; 4 / Aldosivi / 14 / 6 / 2 / 6 / 17 / 6 / +11 / **20** / Advance to Quarter-finals; Source: RSSSF
Boca Juniors		Round	Tigre	
Opponent	Result	Final stages	Opponent	Result
Defensa y Justicia	2–0 (H)	Quarter-finals	River Plate	2–1 (A)
Racing	0–0 (6–5 (p)) (N)	Semi-finals	Argentinos Juniors	1–1 (3–1 (p)) (N)

== Match ==
=== Summary ===
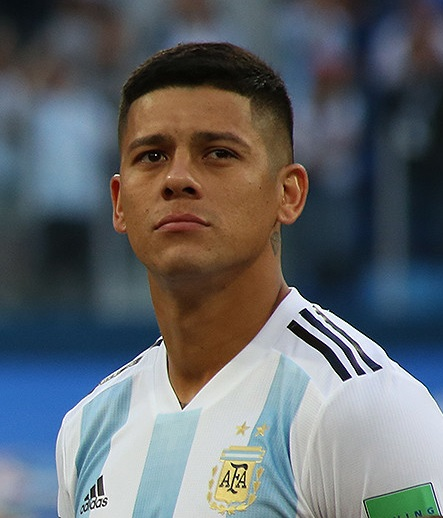
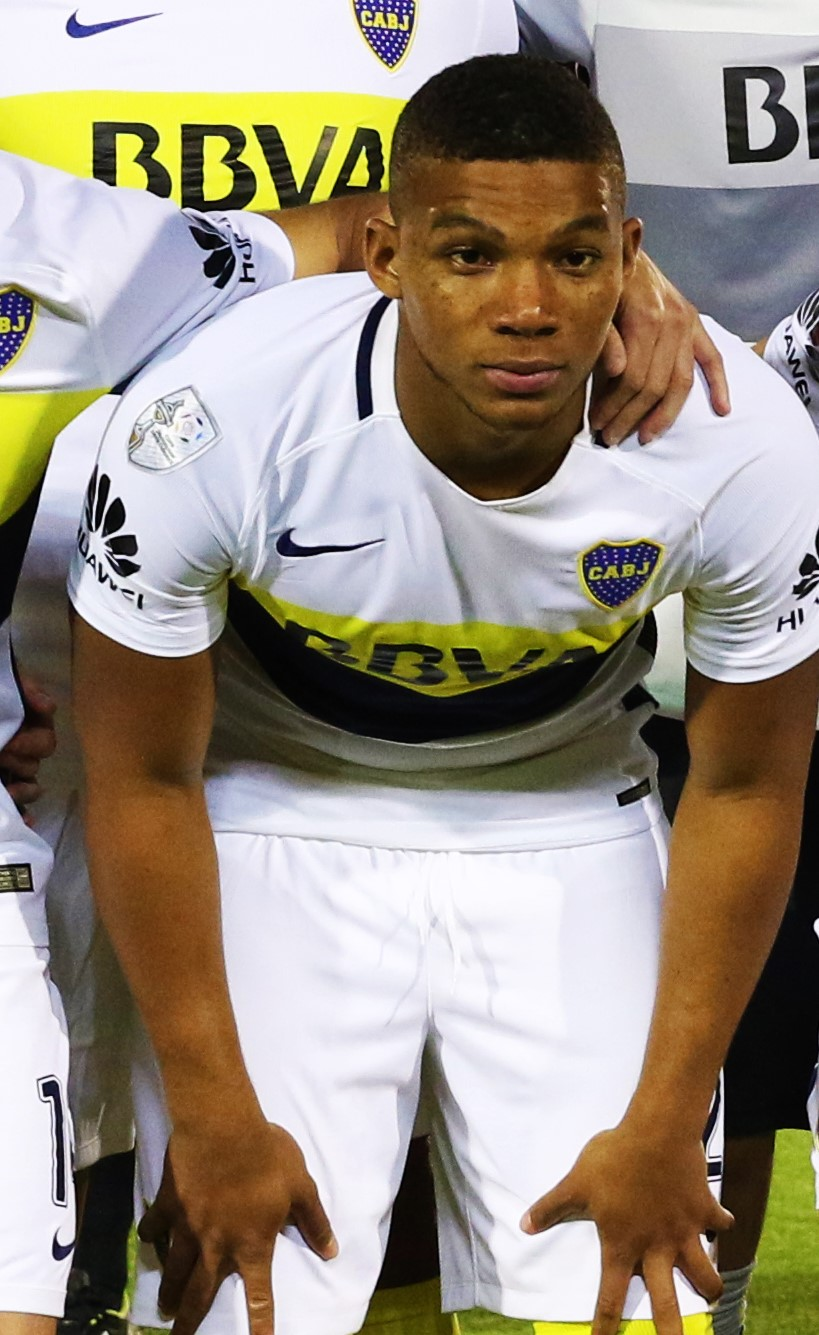
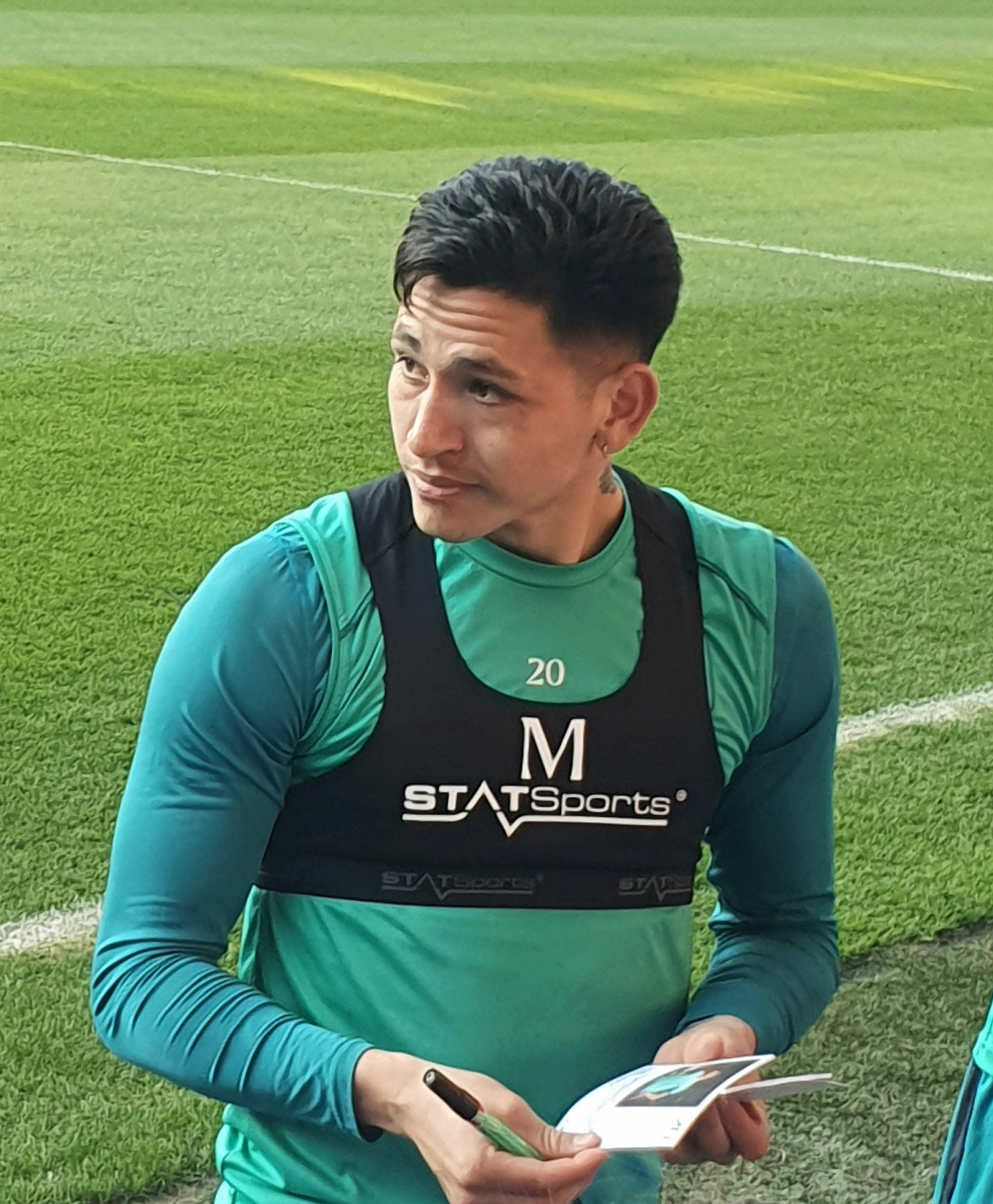
Marcos Rojo, Frank Fabra, and Luis Vázquez, Boca Juniors' scorers

Tigre came out to press with intensity in all sectors of the field, although at times not in a coordinated manner. In principle, it allowed them to have control at the beginning, in which the team also had a header from Víctor Cabrera (after a long pass from Cristian Zabala) that went wide. But as a result of their rival pressing, Boca Juniors finding places to break it. And they concerned Tigre's defenders with their faster players running on the sides.

At 12 minutes, a free kick by Sebastián Villa forced Tigre's goalkeeper Gonzalo Marinelli to make a spectacular flight to save his goal. In the 17th minute, the VAR took three minutes to verify Darío Benedetto's offside in a goal that was finally disallowed. That was one of the few attempts from both teams, due to Boca Juniors suffered the inconsistence of his skilled players (such as Pol Fernández or Óscar Romero) to generate associated game, while Tigre entered into disorder and imprecision.

In the 48th minute, Marcos Rojo headed a corner kick from the right but the ball was directly to Marinelli's hand. However, the ball skipped from his hands to allow the first goal by Boca Juniors at the end of the first half.

Tigre came out determined to take over the ball in the second half. The team gained confidence and played most of the time in the opposite field, against an opponent that retreated to bet on the counterattack. Consequently, Tigre had several chances to tie the match. Mateo Retegui came close to scoring three times; first with a shot blocked by Agustín Rossi, then with a pass from Lucas Blondel that failed to connect, and then with an attack in which he touched the ball twice, but the goalkeeper ended up blocking it.

Seeing his team stuck, Boca Juniors manager Sebastián Battaglia substituted Eduardo Salvio with Juan Ramírez to strengthen the team, but the situation remained the same. In the 22nd minute, Frank Fabra drove to the edge of the penalty area without anyone intercepting him and shot to score Boca Juniors' second goal. With spaces, Boca Juniors could have increased the score, although Tigre also had some occasion to pull one back. But in the 40th minute Villa took a free kick and forward Luis Vázquez set the final 3–0 that allowed Boca Juniors to win a new Copa de la Liga title, the 72nd in the club's history.

=== Details ===
22 May 2022
16:00

Boca Juniors	3–0	Tigre
Rojo 45+3'; Fabra 67'; Vázquez 85'	Report

Estadio Mario Alberto Kempes, Córdoba
Referee: Darío Herrera

**Boca Juniors**	**Tigre**

GK	1	(Argentina) Agustín Rossi
RB	17	(Peru) Luis Advíncula
CB	24	(Argentina) Carlos Izquierdoz (c)
CB	6	(Argentina) Marcos Rojo
LB	18	(Colombia) Frank Fabra
RM	8	(Argentina) Guillermo Fernández		(substituted off) 87'
CM	33	(Argentina) Alan Varela		(substituted off) 87'
LM	11	(Paraguay) Óscar Romero	(yellow card) 22'	(substituted off) 87'
RW	10	(Argentina) Eduardo Salvio		(substituted off) 59'
CF	9	(Argentina) Darío Benedetto		(substituted off) 77'
LW	22	(Colombia) Sebastián Villa
Substitutes:
GK	13	(Argentina) Javier García
DF	3	(Argentina) Agustín Sández
DF	4	(Argentina) Nicolás Figal
DF	5	(Peru) Carlos Zambrano
DF	25	(Argentina) Gastón Ávila
MF	16	(Argentina) Aaron Molinas		(substituted on) 87'
MF	20	(Argentina) Juan Ramírez		(substituted on) 59'
MF	21	(Colombia) Jorman Campuzano		(substituted on) 87'
MF	36	(Argentina) Cristian Medina		(substituted on) 87'
FW	7	(Argentina) Exequiel Zeballos
FW	27	(Argentina) Nicolás Orsini
FW	38	(Argentina) Luis Vázquez		(substituted on) 77'
Manager:
(Argentina) Sebastián Battaglia

GK	23	(Argentina) Gonzalo Marinelli
RB	17	(Argentina) Lucas Blondel	(yellow card) 89'
CB	36	(Argentina) Víctor Cabrera	(yellow card) 33'
CB	6	(Argentina) Abel Luciatti
LB	20	(Argentina) Sebastián Prieto	(yellow card) 47'
RM	16	(Argentina) Alexis Castro		(substituted off) 76'
CM	5	(Argentina) Sebastián Prediger (c)
CM	42	(Argentina) Ezequiel Fernández
LM	27	(Argentina) Cristian Zabala		(substituted off) 76'
RS	32	(Argentina) Mateo Retegui		(substituted off) 83'
LS	11	(Argentina) Facundo Colidio		(substituted off) 83'
Substitutes:
GK	1	(Argentina) Manuel Roffo
DF	2	(Argentina) Oscar Salomón
DF	14	(Argentina) Diego Sosa
DF	19	(Argentina) Nicolás Demartini
MF	8	(Argentina) Martín Galmarini
MF	10	(Argentina) Lucas Menossi
MF	22	(Argentina) Agustín Obando		(substituted on) 76'
MF	25	(Argentina) Agustín Baldi
MF	26	(Argentina) Ezequiel Forclaz
FW	7	(Argentina) Pablo Magnín		(substituted on) 83'
FW	9	(Argentina) Ijiel Protti		(substituted on) 83'
FW	18	(Paraguay) Blas Armoa		(substituted on) 76'
Manager:
(Argentina) Diego Martínez

Man of the Match:
Frank Fabra (Boca Juniors)

Assistant referees:
Juan Pablo Belatti
Diego Bonfá
Fourth official:
Diego Abal
Fifth official:
Gisela Bosso
Video assistant referee:
Mauro Vigliano
Assistant video assistant referees:
Fernando Espinoza
Diego Verlotta

**Match rules**

- 90 minutes
- 30 minutes of extra time if necessary
- Penalty shoot-out if scores still level
- Twelve named substitutes
- Maximum of five substitutions, with a sixth allowed in extra time

=== Statistics ===
Overall
	Boca Juniors	Tigre
Goals scored	3	0
Total shots	13	9
Shots on target	8	3
Ball possession	52%	48%
Corner kicks	8	3
Fouls committed	13	17
Offsides	3	0
Yellow cards	1	3
Red cards	0	0
