= Leandro Brey =

Argentine footballer (born 2002)

Personal information
- Full name: Leandro Leonel Brey
- Date of birth: 21 September 2002 (age 24)
- Place of birth: Lomas de Zamora, Argentina
- Height: 1.91 m (6 ft 3 in)
- Position: Goalkeeper

Team information
- Current team: Boca Juniors
- Number: 12

Youth career
- Los Andes

Senior career*
Years	Team	Apps	(Gls)
2021–2022	Los Andes	34	(0)
2022–	Boca Juniors	25	(0)
- * Club domestic league appearances and goals as of 17:17, 16 June 2026 (UTC)

Leandro Leonel Brey (born 21 September 2002) is an Argentine professional footballer who plays as a goalkeeper for Boca Juniors. He competed for Argentina at the 2024 Summer Olympics.

== Career ==
Brey was born in Lomas de Zamora. His first experience as goalkeeper was in his home-town club Club Olimpia, where he played during his childhood. At the age of 10, Brey arrived in Los Andes playing as defender. The club released him soon after. Brey asked Los Andes to try as goalkeeper, being accepted again by the club. Brey continued his career in the youth divisions of Los Andes until his debut in the senior squad in March 2021 vs Argentino de Quilmes, when he replaced Federico Díaz who had been sent off. Since then, Brey was the starting goalkeeper for Los Andes, which ended the season being the team with less goals conceded (20).

In February 2022 Brey was transferred to Boca Juniors for US$450,000 as the third goalkeeper behind Agustín Rossi and Javier García. Since then, Brey has been the frequent goalkeeper for Boca Juniors' reserve team.

Brey debuted in the senior squad on 12 April, in the 2022 Copa Libertadores match vs Bolivian side Always Ready. Brey substituted the injured Agustín Rossi after 45 minutes. Boca won the match 2–0.

== Career statistics ==
As of match played 30 December 2025

Appearances and goals by club, season and competition
Club	Season	League			National Cup (Note: Includes Copa Argentina)		League Cup (Note: Includes Copa de la Liga Profesional)		Continental		Total	
Club	Season	Division	Apps	Goals	Apps	Goals	Apps	Goals	Apps	Goals	Apps	Goals
Los Andes	2021–22	Primera B	34	0	—		—		—		34	0
Los Andes	Total		34	0	0	0	0	0	0	0	34	0
Boca Juniors	2022	Primera División	—		—		—		1 (Note: Appearances in Copa Libertadores)	0	1	0
Boca Juniors	2023	Primera División	—		—		—		—		0	0
Boca Juniors	2024	Primera División	4	0	3	0	4	0	1 (Note: Appearances in Copa Sudamericana)	0	12	0
Boca Juniors	2025	Primera División	4	0	—		—		—		4	0
Boca Juniors	Total		8	0	3	0	4	0	2	0	17	0
Career total			42	0	3	0	4	0	2	0	51	0

== Honours ==
Boca Juniors

- Copa Sudamericana: 2026
- Primera División: 2022
- Copa de la Liga Profesional: 2022
