= Cristian Medina =

Argentine footballer (born 2000)

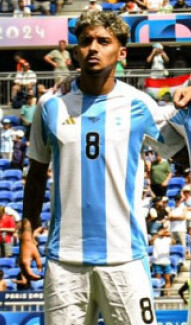
- Medina at the 2024 Summer Olympics

Personal information
- Full name: Cristian Nicolás Medina
- Date of birth: 1 June 2002 (age 24)
- Place of birth: Moreno, Argentina
- Height: 1.78 m (5 ft 10 in)
- Position: Central midfielder

Team information
- Current team: Botafogo
- Number: 6

Youth career
- Rayo de Malaver
- 2012–2020: Boca Juniors

Senior career*
| Years | Team | Apps | (Gls) |
| 2020–2025 | Boca Juniors | 68 | (4) |
| 2025–2026 | Estudiantes (LP) | 36 | (0) |
| 2026– | Botafogo | 25 | (1) |

International career^{‡}
| 2017 | Argentina U15 | 4 | (0) |
| 2018–2019 | Argentina U17 | 13 | (1) |
| 2023– | Argentina U23 | 10 | (0) |
| 2024– | Argentina Olympic Team | 4 | (0) |
- * Club domestic league appearances and goals as of 22:07, 12 March 2026 (UTC) ‡ National team caps and goals as of 18:27, 2 January 2026 (UTC)

Cristian Nicolás Medina (born 1 June 2002) is an Argentine professional footballer who plays as a central midfielder for Botafogo.

Medina had previously played for Boca Juniors.

== Club career ==
=== Boca Juniors ===
In 2012, he was chosen for a player trial at the Social and Sports Club El Fortín in Moreno at the age of 10. He joined Boca Juniors to become a member of the club's junior divisions, under the leadership of Diego Mazzilli and Hugo Perotti. In 2013, Medina was already training with his division, where he discovered his position as a midfielder, although he also played as a forward and attacking midfielder.

He debuted for Boca Juniors' first squad on 14 February 2021, against Club de Gimnasia y Esgrima La Plata. In April of the same year, he scored his first goal for Xeneize against Club Atlético Tucumán, assisted by Carlos Tevez. Boca won the match 3–1. In that year, he joined Agustín Almendra and Alan Varela in the starting midfield, nicknamed MVA by supporters.

In October 2022, Medina renewed and improved his contract with Boca until December 2026. That same month, he won his fourth title, the 2022 Argentine Primera División championship. He finished 2023 with five goals and four assists in 50 games played. On February 25, 2024, he scored his first goal in the Argentine football Superclásico against River Plate, resulting in a 1–1 draw at Estadio Monumental. In August of that year, he scored a last-minute header to earn a draw with Independiente de Mendoza.

=== Botafogo ===
On 20 February 2026, Botafogo announced the signing of Medina until the end of 2029.

== International career ==
Medina was part of Argentina's U15 squad that won the 2017 South American Championship under manager Diego Placente on home soil, as they defeated Brazil in the final. Two years later, Medina was selected by Pablo Aimar's U17s for the 2019 South American Championship in Peru and the 2019 FIFA World Cup in Brazil. He scored once, versus Paraguay, in seven matches as they won the former competition, prior to featuring three times at the latter; as they reached the round of sixteen.

Medina competed for Argentina at the 2024 Summer Olympics.

== Style of play ==
Medina is primarily a central midfielder, though he is capable of playing in various positions across the midfield. He was dubbed the next Fernando Gago by some Argentine media.

== Career statistics ==
As of 29 June 2024.

Appearances and goals by club, season and competition
| Club | Season | League | | | Cup (Note: Includes Copa Argentina) | | League Cup (Note: Includes Copa de la Liga Profesional) | | Continental | | Other | | Total | |
| Club | Season | Division | Apps | Goals | Apps | Goals | Apps | Goals | Apps | Goals | Apps | Goals | Apps | Goals |
|---|---|---|---|---|---|---|---|---|---|---|---|---|---|---|
| Boca Juniors | 2021 | Primera División | 15 | 0 | 4 | 0 | 13 | 1 | 7 (Note: Appearances in Copa Libertadores) | 0 | — | | 39 | 1 |
| Boca Juniors | 2022 | Primera División | 18 | 0 | 5 | 0 | 12 | 0 | 5 | 0 | 1 (Note: Includes Trofeo de Campeones de la Liga Profesional) | 0 | 41 | 0 |
| Boca Juniors | 2023 | Primera División | 23 | 3 | 4 | 1 | 11 | 1 | 11 | 0 | 1 (Note: Includes Supercopa Argentina) | 0 | 50 | 5 |
| Boca Juniors | 2024 | Primera División | 4 | 0 | 1 | 0 | 10 | 2 | 4 (Note: Appearances in the Copa Sudamericana) | 0 | 0 | 0 | 19 | 2 |
| Boca Juniors | Total | | 60 | 3 | 14 | 1 | 46 | 4 | 27 | 0 | 2 | 0 | 149 | 8 |
| Career total | | | 60 | 3 | 14 | 1 | 46 | 4 | 27 | 0 | 2 | 0 | 149 | 8 |

== Honours ==
Boca Juniors

- Primera División: 2022
- Copa Argentina: 2019–20
- Copa de la Liga Profesional: 2020, 2022
- Supercopa Argentina: 2022
- Copa Libertadores runner-up: 2023

Estudiantes

- Primera División: 2025 Clausura
- Trofeo de Campeones: 2025

Argentina U15

- South American U-15 Championship: 2017

Argentina U17

- South American U-17 Championship: 2019
