= Carlos Arce =

Carlos Arce may refer to:

- Carlos Arce (politician) (born 1959), Argentine politician
- Carlos Arce (footballer, born 1985), Argentine right-back
- Carlos Arce (footballer, born 1990), Argentine midfielder
