= Norberto Briasco =

Argentine–Armenian footballer

Personal information
- Full name: Norberto Alejandro Briasco Balekian
- Date of birth: 29 February 1996 (age 30)
- Place of birth: Buenos Aires, Argentina
- Height: 1.86 m (6 ft 1 in)
- Position: Winger

Team information
- Current team: Barracas Central (on loan from Boca Juniors)
- Number: 11

Senior career*
Years	Team	Apps	(Gls)
2016–2021	Huracán	86	(9)
2021–	Boca Juniors	42	(3)
2024–2025	→ Gimnasia y Esgrima LP (loan)	28	(1)
2026–	→ Barracas Central (loan)	10	(1)

International career^{‡}
2018–	Armenia	18	(0)
- * Club domestic league appearances and goals as of 17:03, 3 June 2026 (UTC) ‡ National team caps and goals as of 26 March 2024

Norberto Alejandro Briasco Balekian (Armenian: Նորբերտո Ալեխանդրո Բրիասկո Բալեկյան; born 29 February 1996) is a professional footballer who plays as a forward for Argentine Primera División club Barracas Central, on loan from Boca Juniors and the Armenia national team. Born in Argentina to an Armenian Argentine mother, he has represented Armenia internationally since 2018.

== Early life ==
Briasco was born in Buenos Aires, Argentina. He also holds Armenian citizenship through his mother, surnamed Balekian, whose parents are Armenian. His grandfather helped him learn the Armenian language, with Briasco stating that "it is quite complicated, but I wrote down the basics to study [the language]".

== Club career ==
On 27 August 2016, Briasco made his debut in a 1–0 away defeat against Godoy Cruz after coming on as a substitute at the 75th minute in place of Mauro Bogado. On 11 March 2017, scored his first official goal for Huracán senior squad, that gave his team the final 1–0 win away at San Martín de San Juan.

On 3 March 2017, he made his continental club debut at the 2017 Copa Sudamericana, in a 3–0 away defeat against Deportivo Anzoategui, away in Venezuela. Norberto scored his first continental goal in the return game in Buenos Aires, a 4–0 win that saw Huracán go through to the next round.

On 17 June 2021, Briasco signed a four-year contract with Boca Juniors. He stayed with the club until August 2024, when he was loaned to La Plata's club Gimnasia y Esgrima for the term of 18 months.

== International career ==
On 7 March 2018, Briasco received his first call-up for the Armenia national team for the friendly matches against Estonia and Lithuania. He made his international debut in a 0–0 friendly draw with Estonia on 24 March 2018.

== Career statistics ==
As of 10 December 2025

Appearances and goals by club, season and competition
Club	Season	League			National cup		Continental (Note: Includes appearances in Copa Sudamericana and Copa Libertadores)		Other (Note: Includes appearances in Copa de la Superliga, Copa de la Liga Profesional, Trofeo de Campeones, Supercopa Internacional and Supercopa Argentina)		Total	
Club	Season	Division	Apps	Goals	Apps	Goals	Apps	Goals	Apps	Goals	Apps	Goals
Huracán	2016–17	Argentine Primera División	18	3	0	0	4	1	—		22	4
Huracán	2017–18	Argentine Primera División	5	1	0	0	—		—		5	1
Huracán	2018–19	Argentine Primera División	13	0	0	0	3	0	1	0	17	0
Huracán	2019–20	Argentine Primera División	18	3	3	0	1	0	11	2	33	5
Huracán	Total		54	7	3	0	8	1	12	2	77	10
Boca Juniors	2021	Argentine Primera División	15	1	1	0	2	0	10	1	28	2
Boca Juniors	2022	Argentine Primera División	4	1	1	0	—		1	0	6	1
Boca Juniors	2023	Argentine Primera División	14	1	0	0	3	0	7	0	24	1
Boca Juniors	2024	Argentine Primera División	1	0	0	0	2	0	3	0	6	0
Boca Juniors	Total		34	3	2	0	7	0	21	1	64	4
Gimnasia y Esgrima (loan)	2024	Argentine Primera División	7	1	2	0	—		—		9	1
Gimnasia y Esgrima (loan)	2025	Argentine Primera División	21	0	0	0	—		—		21	0
Gimnasia y Esgrima (loan)	Total		28	1	2	0	0	0	0	0	30	1
Career total			116	11	7	0	15	1	33	3	171	15

== Honours ==
Boca Juniors

- Primera División: 2022
- Copa Argentina: 2019–20
- Copa de la Liga Profesional: 2022
- Supercopa Argentina: 2022
