= Gabriel Aranda =

Argentine footballer

Personal information
- Full name: Gabriel Agustín Aranda
- Date of birth: 16 April 2001 (age 25)
- Place of birth: Ezeiza, Buenos Aires, Argentina
- Height: 1.90 m (6 ft 3 in)
- Position: Centre-back

Team information
- Current team: Racing Córdoba (on loan from Boca Juniors)

Youth career
- Boca Juniors

Senior career*
Years	Team	Apps	(Gls)
2021–	Boca Juniors	11	(0)
2023–2024	→ Banfield (loan)	10	(0)
2025	→ Quilmes (loan)	28	(1)
2026–	→ Racing Córdoba (loan)	5	(0)
- * Club domestic league appearances and goals as of 16:57, 4 May 2026 (UTC)

Gabriel Agustín Aranda (born 16 April 2001) is an Argentine professional footballer who plays as a centre-back for Racing Córdoba, on loan from Boca Juniors.

== Career statistics ==
=== Club ===
As of 18 August 2021.

Club	Season	League		
Club	Season	Division	Apps	Goals
Boca Juniors	2021	Reserve tournament	24	2
Career total			24	2

== Honours ==
Boca Juniors

- Primera División: 2022
- Copa de la Liga Profesional: 2022
- Supercopa Argentina: 2022
