= Exequiel Zeballos =

Argentine footballer (born 2002)

Personal information
- Full name: Oscar Exequiel Zeballos
- Date of birth: 24 April 2002 (age 24)
- Place of birth: La Banda, Argentina
- Height: 1.70 m (5 ft 7 in)
- Position: Left winger

Team information
- Current team: Monza
- Number: 22

Youth career
- Sarmiento (La Banda)
- Los Dorados (TdRH)
- 2014–2020: Boca Juniors

Senior career*
Years	Team	Apps	(Gls)
2020–2026	Boca Juniors	104	(13)
2026–	Monza	3	(1)

International career
2017	Argentina U15	8	(5)
2018–2019	Argentina U17	15	(2)
- * Club domestic league appearances and goals as of 15:07, 28 October 2026 (UTC)

Oscar Exequiel Zeballos (born 24 April 2002), nicknamed "Changuito", is an Argentine professional footballer who plays as a left winger for Serie A club Monza.

== Club career ==
=== Boca Juniors ===
Zeballos arrived at Boca Juniors in 2014, having had stints with Sarmiento de La Banda and Los Dorados de Termas de Río Hondo. In 2018, Zeballos signed his first professional contract; becoming the youngest Boca player to do so. The winger made the breakthrough into the first-team under Miguel Ángel Russo in 2020. He was an unused substitute four times before making his senior bow, including for a Copa Libertadores group stage encounter with Caracas on 22 October. In November, Zeballos made his debut in a Copa de la Liga Profesional victory at home to Newell's Old Boys on 29 November; after replacing Sebastián Villa.

=== Monza ===
On 1 September 2026, Zeballos signed for newly promoted Serie A side Monza for a reported transfer fee of €4m.

== International career ==
Zeballos represented Argentina at U15 and U17 level. He scored five goals at the 2017 South American U-15 Championship as they won the trophy. Two years later, Zeballos netted a goal at both the South American U-17 Championship and FIFA U-17 World Cup across eleven total appearances. He scored the sole goal that his team made in regular time for the Maradona Cup against Football club Barcelona.

== Career statistics ==
As of match played 28 October 2026

Appearances and goals by club, season and competition
Club	Season	League			National cup (Note: Includes Copa Argentina, Coppa Italia)		Continental		Other		Total	
Club	Season	Division	Apps	Goals	Apps	Goals	Apps	Goals	Apps	Goals	Apps	Goals
Boca Juniors	2021	Primera División	14	1	2	0	1 (Note: Appearances in Copa Libertadores)	0	—		17	1
Boca Juniors	2022	Primera División	18	3	3	1	8	0	0	0	29	4
Boca Juniors	2023	Primera División	14	2	2	0	5	0	0	0	21	2
Boca Juniors	2024	Primera División	20	1	3	1	2 (Note: Appearances in Copa Sudamericana)	0	—		25	2
Boca Juniors	2025	Primera División	30	5	1	1	1	0	3 (Note: Appearances in FIFA Club World Cup)	0	35	6
Boca Juniors	2026	Primera División	8	1	0	0	5	0	—		13	1
Boca Juniors	Total		104	13	11	3	22	0	3	0	140	16
Monza	2026–27	Serie A	3	1	0	0	—		—		3	1
Career total			107	14	11	3	22	0	3	0	143	17

== Honours ==
Boca Juniors

- Primera División: 2022, 2026 Liga
- Copa Argentina: 2019–20
- Copa de la Liga Profesional: 2020, 2022
- Supercopa Argentina: 2022

Argentina U15

- South American U-15 Championship: 2017

Argentina U17

- South American U-17 Championship: 2019
