= Esteban Rolón =

Argentine footballer

Personal information
- Full name: Esteban Leonardo Rolón
- Date of birth: 25 March 1995 (age 31)
- Place of birth: Posadas, Argentina
- Height: 1.78 m (5 ft 10 in)
- Position: Midfielder

Team information
- Current team: Barracas Central
- Number: 35

Youth career
- 2007–2016: Argentinos Juniors

Senior career*
Years	Team	Apps	(Gls)
2016–2017	Argentinos Juniors	51	(1)
2017–2020	Málaga	16	(0)
2018–2019	→ Genoa (loan)	19	(0)
2020–2021	Huracán	19	(1)
2021–2025	Boca Juniors	28	(0)
2023–2024	→ Belgrano (loan)	47	(2)
2026	Aldosivi	14	(0)
2026–	Barracas Central	1	(0)
- * Club domestic league appearances and goals as of 16:40, 19 August 2026 (UTC)

Esteban Leonardo Rolón (born 25 March 1995) is an Argentine professional footballer who plays as a central midfielder for Barracas Central.

== Club career ==
=== Argentinos Juniors ===
Born in Posadas, Misiones, Rolón joined Argentinos Juniors' youth setup in 2007 at the age of 12. He made his first team – and Primera División – debut on 4 March 2016, starting in a 1–5 home loss against Defensa y Justicia. He appeared in 11 matches during the season, as his side suffered relegation.

Rolón was an undisputed starter during the 2016–17 campaign, contributing with 40 appearances (39 as a starter) as his side returned to the main category at first attempt. He scored his first professional goal on 25 March 2017, netting his team's second in a 3–1 home win against San Martín de Tucumán.

=== Málaga ===
On 25 August 2017, Rolón signed a four-year contract with La Liga side Málaga CF. He was released on 3 October 2020, along with seven other first team players, due to a layoff.

==== Loan to Genoa ====
On 3 August 2018, Rolón joined to Italian Serie A club Genoa on loan until 30 June 2019.

== Personal life ==
Born in Argentina, Rolón is of Polish descent.

== Career statistics ==
As of 7 September 2020

Appearances and goals by club, season and competition
Club	Season	League			National Cup		Continental		Other		Total	
Club	Season	Division	Apps	Goals	Apps	Goals	Apps	Goals	Apps	Goals	Apps	Goals
Argentinos Juniors	2016	Primera División	11	0	1	0	—		—		12	0
Argentinos Juniors	2016–17	Primera B	40	1	1	0	—		—		41	1
Argentinos Juniors	Total		51	1	2	0	0	0	0	0	53	1
Málaga	2017–18	La Liga	8	0	2	0	—		—		10	0
Genoa (loan)	2018–19	Serie A	19	0	1	0	—		—		20	0
Málaga	2019–20	Segunda División	7	0	1	0	—		—		8	0
Málaga	Total		15	0	3	0	0	0	0	0	18	0
Career total			85	1	6	0	0	0	0	0	91	1

== Honours ==
Boca Juniors

- Primera División: 2022
- Copa Argentina: 2019–20
- Copa de la Liga Profesional: 2022
- Supercopa Argentina: 2022
