= Gabriel Vega =

Argentine footballer

Gabriel Emanuel Vega
Personal information
- Full name: Gabriel Emanuel Vega
- Date of birth: 18 April 2002 (age 24)
- Place of birth: González Catán, Buenos Aires, Argentina
- Height: 1.86 m (6 ft 1 in)
- Position: Midfielder

Team information
- Current team: Nueva Chicago (on loan from Boca Juniors)

Youth career
- Boca Juniors

Senior career*
Years	Team	Apps	(Gls)
2021–	Boca Juniors	5	(0)
2022	→ Godoy Cruz (loan)	10	(0)
2024	→ Atlanta (loan)	17	(0)
2025	→ Banfield (loan)	9	(1)
2026–	→ Nueva Chicago (loan)	5	(0)
- * Club domestic league appearances and goals as of 17:11, 13 April 2026 (UTC)

Gabriel Ramiro Vega (born 18 April 2002) is an Argentine footballer who plays as a midfielder for Nueva Chicago, on loan from Boca Juniors.

== Career statistics ==
=== Club ===
As of 18 August 2021.

Club	Season	League			Cup		Continental		Other		Total	
Club	Season	Division	Apps	Goals	Apps	Goals	Apps	Goals	Apps	Goals	Apps	Goals
Boca Juniors	2021	Argentine Primera División	2	0	0	0	0	0	0	0	2	0
Career total			2	0	0	0	0	0	0	0	2	0
