= Aarón Molinas =

Argentine footballer

Personal information
- Full name: Aarón Nicolás Molinas
- Date of birth: 2 August 2000 (age 26)
- Place of birth: Lomas del Mirador, Argentina
- Height: 1.75 m (5 ft 9 in)
- Position: Midfielder

Team information
- Current team: Defensa y Justicia
- Number: 10

Youth career
- Boca Juniors

Senior career*
Years	Team	Apps	(Gls)
2021–2024	Boca Juniors	43	(0)
2023	→ Tigre (loan)	35	(1)
2024–	Defensa y Justicia	70	(11)

International career^{‡}
2018	Argentina U20	1	(0)
- * Club domestic league appearances and goals as of 17:01, 10 May 2026 (UTC) ‡ National team caps and goals as of 23:04, 18 August 2021 (UTC)

Aarón Nicolás Molinas (born 2 August 2000) is an Argentine footballer currently playing as a midfielder for Defensa y Justicia.

== Career statistics ==
=== Club ===
As of 6 November 2025

Club	Season	League			Cup		League Cup			Continental		Other		Total						
Club	Season	Division	Apps	Goals	Assist	Apps	Goals	Assist	Apps	Goals	Assist	Apps	Goals	Assist	Apps	Goals	Assist	Apps	Goals	Assist
Boca Juniors	2021	Argentine Primera División	18	0	2	1	0	0	0	0	0	1	0	0	0	0	0	20	0	2
Boca Juniors	2022	Argentine Primera División	14	0	1	2	0	0	11	0	1	0	0	0	0	0	0	27	0	2
Boca Juniors	Total		32	0	3	3	0	0	11	0	1	1	0	0	0	0	0	47	0	4
Tigre	2023	Argentine Primera División	22	1	2	0	0	0	13	0	1	6	0	0	0	0	0	41	1	3
Tigre	Total		22	1	2	0	0	0	13	0	1	6	0	0	0	0	0	41	1	3
Defensa y Justicia	2024	Argentine Primera División	24	5	3	0	0	0	4	1	0	3	0	0	0	0	0	31	6	3
Defensa y Justicia	2025	Argentine Primera División	26	2	3	1	0	0	0	0	0	5	0	0	0	0	0	31	2	3
Defensa y Justicia	Total		50	7	6	1	0	0	4	1	0	8	0	0	0	0	0	63	8	6
Career total			104	8	11	4	0	0	28	1	2	15	0	0	0	0	0	151	9	13

== Honours ==
Boca Juniors

- Copa de la Liga Profesional: 2022
