= Javier García (Argentine footballer) =

Argentine footballer

Personal information
- Full name: Javier Hernán García
- Date of birth: 29 January 1987 (age 39)
- Place of birth: Buenos Aires, Argentina
- Height: 1.80 m (5 ft 11 in)
- Position: Goalkeeper

Team information
- Current team: Boca Juniors
- Number: 13

Youth career
- Boca Juniors

Senior career*
Years	Team	Apps	(Gls)
2008–2012	Boca Juniors	41	(0)
2011–2012	→ Tigre (loan)	37	(0)
2012–2017	Tigre	165	(0)
2017–2020	Racing	12	(0)
2020–	Boca Juniors	20	(0)

International career
2011	Argentina	1	(0)
- * Club domestic league appearances and goals as of 20:50, 6 May 2024 (UTC)

Javier Hernán García (born 29 January 1987) is an Argentine professional football goalkeeper who plays for Boca Juniors in the Argentine Primera División.

== Club career ==
García was born in Buenos Aires. He started his professional career playing for Boca Juniors in the Argentine Primera División. He made his debut on 24 August 2008 in a 2–1 victory against Lanús.

In July 2011, García was loaned out to Tigre for 1 year.

== International career ==
In 2007 García was part of the Argentina U-20 squad that won the FIFA U-20 World Cup, but he did not feature in any of the matches.

== Honours ==
Boca Juniors

- Copa Sudamericana: 2026
- Primera División: 2008 Apertura, 2022
- Copa Argentina: 2019–20
- Copa de la Liga Profesional: 2020, 2022
- Supercopa Argentina: 2022
- Recopa Sudamericana: 2008

Racing Club

- Primera División: 2018–19
- Trofeo de Campeones: 2019

Argentina U20

- FIFA U-20 World Cup: 2007
