= Abel Luciatti =

Argentine footballer

Personal information
- Full name: Brian Abel Luciatti
- Date of birth: February 18, 1993 (age 33)
- Place of birth: Argentina
- Height: 1.80 m (5 ft 11 in)
- Position: Centre-back

Team information
- Current team: Cerro Porteño

Youth career
- San Lorenzo

Senior career*
Years	Team	Apps	(Gls)
2011–2014	San Lorenzo	0	(0)
2014–2017	Almagro	94	(4)
2017	Renofa Yamaguchi	12	(0)
2018–2019	Platense	23	(2)
2019–2020	San Martín Tucumán	15	(1)
2020–2023	Tigre	99	(6)
2024	Lanús	25	(0)
2025–	Cerro Porteño	2	(0)
- * Club domestic league appearances and goals as of 12 August 2025

Abel Luciatti (born February 18, 1993) is an Argentine footballer, who plays as a centre-back for Cerro Porteño.

== Career ==
Abel Luciatti joined Argentine Primera División club Club Atlético Lanús in 2024.
