= Carlos Arce (footballer, born 1985) =

Argentine football defender

Personal information
- Full name: Carlos Dario Arce
- Date of birth: 4 February 1985 (age 41)
- Place of birth: Lanús, Argentina
- Height: 1.72 m (5 ft 8 in)
- Position: Right back

Team information
- Current team: Lanús
- Number: 25

Youth career
- Lanús

Senior career*
Years	Team	Apps	(Gls)
2005–2010	Lanús	40	(0)
2006	→ La Paz (loan)	1	(0)
2011	Atlanta	2	(0)
2012	San Telmo	18	(0)
- * Club domestic league appearances and goals

Carlos Dario Arce (born 4 February 1985) is an Argentine former football defender.
