= Alan Varela =

Argentine footballer

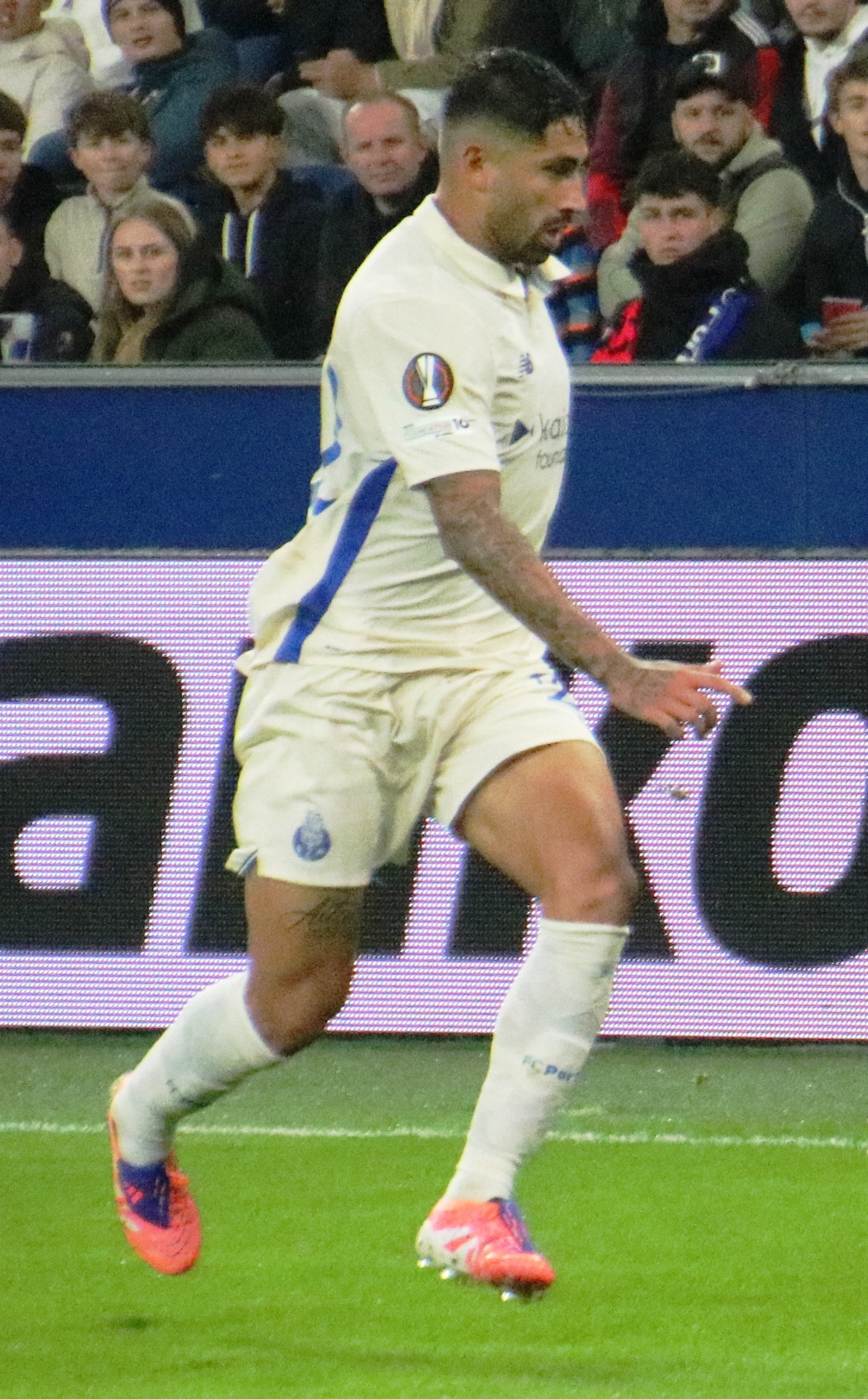
- Varela in 2025 with Porto

Personal information
- Full name: Alan Gonzalo Varela
- Date of birth: 4 July 2001 (age 25)
- Place of birth: Isidro Casanova, Argentina
- Height: 1.77 m (5 ft 10 in)
- Positions: Defensive midfielder; central midfielder

Team information
- Current team: Porto
- Number: 22

Youth career
- Barcelona Luján
- 2012–2020: Boca Juniors

Senior career*
Years	Team	Apps	(Gls)
2020–2023	Boca Juniors	78	(0)
2023–	Porto	79	(4)

International career^{‡}
2019	Argentina U20	3	(0)
2024	Argentina U23	4	(0)
- * Club domestic league appearances and goals as of 15:20, 3 February 2026 (UTC) ‡ National team caps and goals as of 9 November 2025

Alan Gonzalo Varela (born 4 July 2001) is an Argentine professional footballer who plays as a defensive or central midfielder for Primeira Liga club Porto.

== Club career ==
=== Boca Juniors ===
Varela joined Boca Juniors in 2012 from Barcelona Luján; a subsidiary of Barcelona, who later became known as Barcelona Juniors following a partnership with Boca. After training with Boca's senior side during 2019, a year that also saw him sign his first professional contract, Varela made the breakthrough into Miguel Ángel Russo's first-team in 2020. He was an unused substitute seven times in all competitions between September and December, including for the first time on 17 September for a Copa Libertadores win over Libertad. Varela's senior debut came on 20 December in a Copa de la Liga Profesional game with Independiente.

=== Porto ===
On 16 August 2023, Primeira Liga club Porto announced the signing of Varela on a five-year contract, for a reported fee of €8 million + €3 million in performance-related add-ons. He made his debut on 3 September, coming off the bench to replace Stephen Eustáquio at half-time in a 1–1 league draw at home against Arouca. Twelve days later, Varela made his first start for the Dragons, away at Estrela da Amadora, where he made a last-minute goal-line clearance to guarantee a 1–0 Porto win. On 20 January 2024, he scored his first goal for Porto, in a 5–0 league victory at home to Moreirense.

== International career ==
In 2019, Varela was selected by Argentina U20 manager Esteban Solari for the COTIF Tournament in Spain.

== Career statistics ==
As of match played 2 February 2026

Appearances and goals by club, season and competition
Club	Season	League			National cup (Note: Includes Copa Argentina, Taça de Portugal)		League cup (Note: Includes Taça da Liga)		Continental		Other		Total	
Club	Season	Division	Apps	Goals	Apps	Goals	Apps	Goals	Apps	Goals	Apps	Goals	Apps	Goals
Boca Juniors	2020	Argentine Primera División	4	0	3	0	—		—		—		7	0
Boca Juniors	2021	Argentine Primera División	20	0	0	0	—		7 (Note: Appearances in Copa Libertadores)	0	—		27	0
Boca Juniors	2022	Argentine Primera División	30	0	4	0	—		7	1	2 (Note: One appearance in Trofeo de Campeones de la Liga Profesional, one appearance in Supercopa Argentina)	0	43	1
Boca Juniors	2023	Argentine Primera División	24	0	1	0	—		8	1	1 (Note: Appearance in Supercopa Internacional)	0	34	1
Boca Juniors	Total		78	0	8	0	—		22	2	3	0	111	2
Porto	2023–24	Primeira Liga	30	2	6	0	0	0	8 (Note: Appearances in UEFA Champions League)	0	—		44	2
Porto	2024–25	Primeira Liga	31	0	2	0	1	0	9 (Note: Appearances in UEFA Europa League)	0	4 (Note: One appearance in Supertaça Cândido de Oliveira, three appearances in FIFA Club World Cup)	0	47	0
Porto	2025–26	Primeira Liga	18	2	3	0	1	0	5	0	0	0	27	2
Porto	Total		79	4	11	0	2	0	22	0	4	0	118	4
Career total			157	4	19	0	2	0	44	2	7	0	229	6

== Honours ==
Boca Juniors

- Argentine Primera División: 2022
- Copa Argentina: 2020
- Copa de la Liga Profesional: 2020, 2022
- Supercopa Argentina: 2022

Porto

- Primeira Liga: 2025–26
- Taça de Portugal: 2023–24
- Supertaça Cândido de Oliveira: 2024, 2026
