= Juan Ramírez (footballer, born 1993) =

Argentine footballer

Personal information
- Full name: Juan Edgardo Ramírez
- Date of birth: 25 May 1993 (age 33)
- Place of birth: Moreno, Argentina
- Height: 1.74 m (5 ft 8 1/2 in)
- Position: Midfielder

Team information
- Current team: Boca Juniors

Youth career
- Argentinos Juniors

Senior career*
Years	Team	Apps	(Gls)
2011–2015	Argentinos Juniors	73	(5)
2015–2017	Colorado Rapids	27	(1)
2016	→ Almería (loan)	16	(1)
2016–2017	→ Talleres (loan)	11	(0)
2017–2019	Talleres	49	(6)
2019–2021	San Lorenzo	34	(3)
2021–	Boca Juniors	74	(2)
2025	→ Lanús (loan)	17	(0)
- * Club domestic league appearances and goals as of 18:16, 15 December 2025 (UTC)

Juan Edgardo Ramírez (born 25 May 1993) is an Argentine professional footballer who plays as a midfielder for Boca Juniors.

== Club career ==
=== Argentinos Juniors ===
Ramírez was born in Moreno, Buenos Aires. An Argentinos Juniors youth graduate, he made his professional debut on 21 May 2011, in a 0–1 loss against Olimpo, at the age of just 17.

Ramírez scored his first goal as a professional on 13 May 2012, in a 2–1 win against Racing Club.

=== Colorado Rapids ===
On 20 February 2015, Colorado Rapids confirmed that they had signed Ramírez to a young designated player contract.

On 24 August 2017, Colorado and Ramírez agreed to mutually terminate his contract at the club.

==== Almería (loan) ====
Ramírez signed on loan with Segunda División side UD Almería on 24 January 2016, reuniting with Néstor Gorosito, his former manager at Argentinos Juniors.

==== Talleres (loan) ====
On 8 August 2016, Ramírez joined Argentine Primera División club Talleres on loan.

== Career statistics ==
As of 11 June 2024

Club	Season	League			National Cup		Continental		Other		Total	
Club	Season	Division	Apps	Goals	Apps	Goals	Apps	Goals	Apps	Goals	Apps	Goals
Argentinos Juniors	2010-11	Primera División	3	0	—		—		—		3	0
Argentinos Juniors	2011-12	Primera División	19	1	1	0	2 (Note: Appearance(s) in Copa Sudamericana)	0	—		22	1
Argentinos Juniors	2012-13	Primera División	14	0	1	0	0	0	—		15	0
Argentinos Juniors	2013-14	Primera División	17	2	4	0	—		—		21	2
Argentinos Juniors	2014	Primera Nacional	20	2	—		—		—		20	2
Argentinos Juniors	Total		73	5	6	0	2	0	—		81	5
Colorado Rapids	2015	MLS	27	1	—		—		—		27	1
Almería (loan)	2015-16	Segunda División	16	1	—		—		—		16	1
Talleres (loan)	2016-17	Primera División	11	0	—		—		1 (Note: Appearance(s) in Torneos de Verano)	0	12	0
Talleres	2017-18	Primera División	26	5	1	0	—		2	0	29	5
Talleres	2018-19	Primera División	23	1	3	1	4 (Note: Appearance(s) in Copa Libertadores)	2	5 (Note: Four appearance(s) in Copa de la Superliga, One appearance in Torneos de Verano)	0	35	4
Talleres	Total		49	6	4	1	4	2	7	0	64	9
San Lorenzo	2019-20	Primera División	16	1	—		—		—		16	1
San Lorenzo	2020-21	Primera División	11	1	—		—		—		11	1
San Lorenzo	2021	Primera División	12	1	1	0	10 (Note: Six appearances in Copa Sudamericana, Four appearances in Copa Libertadores)	0	1 (Note: Appearance(s) in Copa de la Superliga)	0	24	1
San Lorenzo	Total		39	3	1	0	10	0	1	0	51	3
Boca Juniors	2021	Primera División	16	1	3	0	—		0	0	19	1
Boca Juniors	2022	Primera División	37	1	3	0	7	0	4 (Note: One appearance in Trofeo de Campeones, Three appearances in Torneos de Verano)	0	51	1
Boca Juniors	2023	Primera División	19	0	1	0	2	0	2 (Note: One appearance in Supercopa Argentina, One appearance in Supercopa Internacional)	0	24	0
Boca Juniors	2024	Primera División	2	0	0	0	1	0	—		3	0
Boca Juniors	Total		74	2	7	0	10	0	6	0	97	2
Career Total			289	18	18	1	26	2	15	0	348	21

== Honours ==
Lanús

- Copa Sudamericana: 2025

Boca Juniors

- Primera División: 2022
- Copa Argentina: 2019–20
- Copa de la Liga Profesional: 2022
- Supercopa Argentina: 2022
