= Lucas Blondel =

Swiss footballer (born 1996)

Personal information
- Full name: Lucas Blondel
- Date of birth: 14 September 1996 (age 30)
- Place of birth: Buenos Aires, Argentina
- Height: 1.78 m (5 ft 10 in)
- Position: Right back

Team information
- Current team: Huracán (on loan from Boca Juniors)
- Number: 2

Youth career
- 2004–2017: Atlético Rafaela

Senior career*
Years	Team	Apps	(Gls)
2016–2021	Atlético Rafaela	71	(5)
2021–2023	Tigre	89	(7)
2023–	Boca Juniors	28	(3)
2026–	→ Huracán (loan)	10	(1)

International career^{‡}
2025–	Switzerland	4	(0)
- * Club domestic league appearances and goals as of 17:06, 6 July 2026 (UTC) ‡ National team caps and goals as of 23:52, 10 June 2025 (UTC)

Lucas Blondel (born 14 September 1996) is a professional footballer who plays as a right-back for Argentine Primera División club Huracán on loan from Boca Juniors. Born in Argentina, he represents the Switzerland national team.

== Club career ==
=== Atlético Rafaela ===
Born in Buenos Aires to a Swiss father and an Argentine mother, Blondel joined Atlético de Rafaela's youth setup at the age of seven. He made his first team debut for the club on 2 June 2016, coming on as a late substitute for Nelson Benítez in a 2–2 Copa Argentina draw against Ferro Carril Oeste (3–2 win on penalties). His Primera División occurred on 30 April of the following year, replacing Ángelo Martino in a 2–1 away win over Olimpo; he featured in a further six league matches during the campaign, as his side suffered relegation.

Blondel scored his first professional goal on 18 February 2018, netting his team's second in a 2–0 Primera B Nacional away win over Ferro Carril Oeste.

=== Tigre ===
On 18 February 2021, Blondel joined Tigre on a three-year deal, as the club paid a rumoured fee of US$ 300,000 for 70% of his economic rights. He made his debut for the club on 20 February, replacing Cristian Zabala in a 1–1 home draw (5–3 penalty win) against Alvarado also for the national cup.

An immediate starter, Blondel contributed with three goals in 28 league appearances during the 2021 campaign, as Tigre returned to the top tier. He scored his first goal in the category on 11 February 2022, netting the opener in a 1–1 away draw against Godoy Cruz.

=== Boca Juniors ===
On 20 July 2023, Blondel joined Boca Juniors.

== International career ==
Born in Argentina, Blondel is of Swiss descent through his father, and spent several summers in Switzerland during his youth. He holds dual Argentine and Swiss citizenship, making him eligible to represent either country at the international level. On 13 March 2025, following consistent performances at club level, he received his first call-up to the Switzerland national team. He made his debut for Switzerland eight days later in a friendly match that ended 1–1 away against Northern Ireland.

== Career statistics ==
=== Club ===
As of match played 20 May 2025

Club statistics
Club	Season	League			National cup (Note: Includes Copa Argentina)		League cup (Note: Includes Copa de la Liga Profesional)		Continental		Other		Total	
Club	Season	Division	Apps	Goals	Apps	Goals	Apps	Goals	Apps	Goals	Apps	Goals	Apps	Goals
Atlético Rafaela	2016	Argentine Primera División	0	0	1	0	—		—		0	0	1	0
Atlético Rafaela	2016–17	Argentine Primera División	7	0	1	0	—		—		0	0	8	0
Atlético Rafaela	2017–18	Primera B Nacional	22	1	1	0	—		—		0	0	23	1
Atlético Rafaela	2018–19	Primera B Nacional	14	0	3	0	—		—		0	0	17	0
Atlético Rafaela	2019–20	Primera B Nacional	19	3	0	0	—		—		—		19	3
Atlético Rafaela	2020	Primera B Nacional	9	1	0	0	—		—		—		9	1
Atlético Rafaela	Total		71	5	6	0	—		—		0	0	77	5
Tigre	2021	Primera Nacional	28	3	4	0	—		—		—		32	3
Tigre	2022	Argentine Primera División	26	1	0	0	17	3	—		1 (Note: Appearance in Trofeo de Campeones de la Liga Profesional)	0	44	4
Tigre	2023	Argentine Primera División	18	0	0	0	—		5 (Note: Appearances in Copa Sudamericana)	1	—		23	1
Tigre	Total		72	4	4	0	17	3	5	1	1	0	99	8
Boca Juniors	2023	Argentine Primera División	8	1	2	1	—		—		—		10	2
Boca Juniors	2024	Argentine Primera División	9	2	1	0	—		1 (Note: Appearance in Copa Libertadores)	0	—		11	2
Boca Juniors	2025	Argentine Primera División	11	0	0	0	—		—		—		11	0
Boca Juniors	Total		28	3	3	1	—		1	0	0	0	32	4
Career total			171	12	13	1	17	3	6	1	1	0	208	17
