= Sebastián Prieto (footballer) =

Argentine footballer (born 1993)

Personal information
- Full name: Sebastián Nahuel Prieto
- Date of birth: 9 April 1993 (age 33)
- Place of birth: Argentina
- Height: 1.80 m (5 ft 11 in)
- Position: Left-back

Team information
- Current team: Argentinos Juniors
- Number: 20

Youth career
- Lanús

Senior career*
Years	Team	Apps	(Gls)
2014–2017	Talleres	93	(6)
2017–2018	UAI Urquiza	32	(1)
2018–2020	Temperley	41	(4)
2020–2024	Tigre	110	(4)
2024–	Argentinos Juniors	68	(4)
- * Club domestic league appearances and goals as of 17:24, 10 July 2026 (UTC)

Sebastián Nahuel Prieto (born 9 April 1993) is an Argentine professional footballer who plays as a left-back for Argentinos Juniors.

== Career ==
Prieto, after passing through Lanús' academy, began his senior career with Talleres. His second season with the club, 2015, concluded with promotion to Primera B Metropolitana, after he made fifty-six appearances and scored one goal. He stayed for two further campaigns, netting five times as they secured sixth and sixteenth-place finishes. In July 2017, Prieto completed a move across the third tier to UAI Urquiza. One goal in thirty-seven encounters followed, with Defensores de Belgrano eliminating them in the play-off finals. In June 2018, Temperley of Primera B Nacional signed Prieto. His first goal came in 2019 versus Ferro Carril Oeste.

== Career statistics ==
As of 28 March 2019.

Appearances and goals by club, season and competition
Club	Season	League			Cup		Continental		Other		Total	
Club	Season	Division	Apps	Goals	Apps	Goals	Apps	Goals	Apps	Goals	Apps	Goals
Talleres	2016	Primera B Metropolitana	17	2	1	0	—		0	0	18	2
Talleres	2016–17	Primera B Metropolitana	20	3	0	0	—		0	0	20	3
Talleres	Total		37	5	1	0	—		0	0	38	5
UAI Urquiza	2017–18	Primera B Metropolitana	32	1	0	0	—		5 (Note: Appearance(s) in the Primera B Metropolitana play-offs)	0	37	1
Temperley	2018–19	Primera B Nacional	18	1	3	0	—		0	0	21	1
Career total			87	7	4	0	—		5	0	96	7
