= 2022 Copa de la Liga Profesional =

Tournament details
- Country: Argentina
- Dates: 10 February – 22 May 2022
- Teams: 28

Final positions
- Champions: Boca Juniors (2nd title)
- 2023 Copa Libertadores: Racing

Tournament statistics
- Matches played: 203
- Goals scored: 525 (2.59 per match)
- Top goal scorer: Mauro Boselli (10 goals)

The 2022 Copa de la Liga Profesional (officially the Copa Binance 2022 for sponsorship reasons) was the third edition of the Copa de la Liga Profesional, an Argentine domestic cup. It began on 10 February and ended on 22 May 2022.

The competition was contested by 28 teams, 26 clubs from the 2021 Primera División season plus two teams promoted from the Primera Nacional (Tigre and Barracas Central). After the end of the Copa de la Liga, it will start the 2022 Primera División season, in order to complete the schedule prior to the 2022 FIFA World Cup. Colón were the defending champions but were eliminated in the group stage.

Boca Juniors won their second title after they defeated Tigre 3–0 in the final. As champions, Boca Juniors qualified for the 2023 Copa Libertadores and the 2022 Trofeo de Campeones.

As Boca Juniors qualified for the Copa Libertadores group stage by winning the 2022 Argentine Primera División, Racing (best team in the 2022 aggregate table) earned the Copa de la Liga Profesional berth.

== Format ==
For the group stage, the 28 teams were drawn into two groups of fourteen teams each, playing on a single round-robin basis. Additionally, each team played one interzonal match against its rival team in the other zone. In each group, the top four teams advanced to the quarter-finals. The final stages (quarter-finals, semi-finals and final) were played on a single-legged basis.

== Draw ==
The draw for the group stage was held on 11 January 2022, 15:00, at the Hilton Hotel in Buenos Aires. The 28 teams were drawn into two groups of fourteen containing one team from each of the interzonal matches.

Interzonal matches
Team 1	Team 2
Aldosivi; Argentinos Juniors; Arsenal; Atlético Tucumán; Banfield; Barracas Central; Boca Juniors; Colón; Estudiantes (LP); Godoy Cruz; Huracán; Independiente; Newell's Old Boys; Platense	Patronato; Vélez Sarsfield; Defensa y Justicia; Central Córdoba (SdE); Lanús; Sarmiento (J); River Plate; Unión; Gimnasia y Esgrima (LP); Talleres (C); San Lorenzo; Racing; Rosario Central; Tigre

== Group stage ==
In the group stage, each group was played on a single round-robin basis. Additionally, in the seventh round, each team played one interzonal match against its rival team in the other zone. Teams were ranked according to the following criteria: 1. Points (3 points for a win, 1 point for a draw, and 0 points for a loss); 2. Goal difference; 3. Goals scored; 4. Head-to-head points; 5. Head-to-head goal difference; 6. Head-to-head goals scored; 7. Play off match; 8. Draw.

The top four teams of each group advanced to the quarter-finals.

=== Zone A ===
Pos	Team	Pld	W	D	L	GF	GA	GD	Pts	Qualification
1	Racing	14	8	6	0	25	10	+15	30	Advance to Quarter-finals
2	River Plate	14	9	2	3	31	12	+19	29	Advance to Quarter-finals
3	Defensa y Justicia	14	7	4	3	26	19	+7	25	Advance to Quarter-finals
4	Argentinos Juniors	14	7	4	3	21	16	+5	25	Advance to Quarter-finals
5	Gimnasia y Esgrima (LP)	14	7	3	4	24	20	+4	24	
6	Newell's Old Boys	14	7	2	5	17	15	+2	23	
7	Sarmiento (J)	14	6	3	5	17	24	−7	21	
8	Banfield	14	5	4	5	18	15	+3	19	
9	Unión	14	5	2	7	11	13	−2	17	
10	San Lorenzo	14	3	6	5	15	17	−2	15	
11	Atlético Tucumán	14	2	5	7	13	23	−10	11	
12	Talleres (C)	14	3	2	9	9	21	−12	11	
13	Platense	14	2	4	8	12	23	−11	10	
14	Patronato	14	3	1	10	10	25	−15	10	

Source: AFA

=== Zone B ===
Pos	Team	Pld	W	D	L	GF	GA	GD	Pts	Qualification
1	Estudiantes (LP)	14	8	4	2	33	20	+13	28	Advance to Quarter-finals
2	Boca Juniors	14	7	6	1	19	11	+8	27	Advance to Quarter-finals
3	Tigre	14	5	5	4	17	12	+5	20	Advance to Quarter-finals
4	Aldosivi	14	6	2	6	17	16	+1	20	Advance to Quarter-finals
5	Barracas Central	14	6	1	7	17	24	−7	19	
6	Vélez Sarsfield	14	4	6	4	13	12	+1	18	
7	Huracán	14	5	3	6	17	19	−2	18	
8	Arsenal	14	3	8	3	20	19	+1	17	
9	Colón	14	3	7	4	18	19	−1	16	
10	Independiente	14	3	7	4	17	18	−1	16	
11	Godoy Cruz	14	3	7	4	21	24	−3	16	
12	Lanús	14	3	6	5	17	18	−1	15	
13	Central Córdoba (SdE)	14	3	6	5	17	23	−6	15	
14	Rosario Central	14	4	2	8	16	20	−4	14	

Source: AFA

=== Results ===
==== Zone A ====
Home \ Away	ARG	ATU	BAN	DYJ	GLP	NOB	PAT	PLA	RAC	RIV	SLO	SAR	TAL	UNI
Argentinos Juniors				0–1		3–0					1–1	0–0	2–1	2–1
Atlético Tucumán	2–4				1–2		1–0	2–2	0–4				3–0	
Banfield	0–2	1–1		2–3	4–0					1–2	0–0		3–1	
Defensa y Justicia		1–1			3–2		1–0	1–1	2–2	1–2				
Gimnasia y Esgrima (LP)	2–2					3–1					1–0	1–3	2–1	1–0
Newell's Old Boys		4–0	1–0	1–0			1–0	3–1		0–2	1–2			
Patronato	0–1		0–1		0–6				2–3			0–1	0–0	2–1
Platense	1–1		0–1		0–3		1–2		0–1			2–0	1–0	
Racing	3–0		1–1		0–0	0–0						4–1	1–0	1–0
River Plate	4–2	1–1			4–0		4–1	2–1	2–2					
San Lorenzo		1–1		3–4			1–2	2–2	1–1	0–1				
Sarmiento (J)		1–0	2–2	2–1		2–2				0–7	2–1			2–1
Talleres (C)				1–5		1–2				1–0	0–1	1–0		0–0
Unión		1–0	2–1	1–2		1–0		1–0		1–0	1–2			

Source: AFA
Legend: Blue = home team win; Yellow = draw; Red = away team win.

==== Zone B ====
Home \ Away	ALD	ARS	BAR	BOC	CCO	COL	EST	GOD	HUR	IND	LAN	ROS	TIG	VEL
Aldosivi		1–2		1–2	0–0				0–2			1–0	1–0	
Arsenal			0–1			2–0		3–3	2–1		2–2	1–1		0–0
Barracas Central	2–1						1–6	3–1		0–1			0–2	1–1
Boca Juniors		2–2	2–0			1–1		1–1	0–1		1–1	2–1		
Central Córdoba (SdE)		3–3	3–1	1–2		0–2			2–2		3–3	0–1		
Colón	1–3		2–1				2–2	3–1		2–2				1–2
Estudiantes (LP)	2–1	3–2		0–1	5–0					2–1	2–1		2–1	
Godoy Cruz	0–2				1–0		3–3			3–3	1–1		1–1	0–0
Huracán			1–2			1–1	2–3	1–3			1–0	2–1		2–0
Independiente	1–1	1–0		2–2	1–1				3–0				1–1	
Lanús	1–2		2–0			1–1				1–0		3–1	0–0	
Rosario Central			1–3			2–2	3–1	1–2		3–0				1–0
Tigre		0–0		0–2	1–1	1–0			2–1			2–0		
Vélez Sarsfield	2–0			0–0	1–2		1–1			0–0	3–1		3–2	

Source: AFA
Legend: Blue = home team win; Yellow = draw; Red = away team win.

==== Interzonal matches ====
Home	Score	Away
San Lorenzo	0–0	Huracán
Gimnasia y Esgrima (LP)	1–1	Estudiantes (LP)
Defensa y Justicia	1–1	Arsenal
Argentinos Juniors	1–0	Vélez Sarsfield
River Plate	0–1	Boca Juniors
Talleres (C)	2–1	Godoy Cruz
Atlético Tucumán	0–1	Central Córdoba (SdE)
Lanús	0–1	Banfield
Independiente	1–2	Racing
Rosario Central	0–1	Newell's Old Boys
Aldosivi	3–1	Patronato
Colón	0–0	Unión
Tigre	4–0	Platense
Barracas Central	2–1	Sarmiento (J)

Source:AFA
Legend: Blue = home team win; Yellow = draw; Red = away team win.

== Final stages ==
Starting from the quarter-finals, the teams played a single-elimination tournament on a single-leg basis with the following rules:

- In the quarter-finals the higher-seeded team hosted the leg, while the semi-finals were played at a neutral venue.
  - If tied, a penalty shoot-out would be used to determine the winners.
- The Final was played at a neutral venue.
  - If tied, extra time would be played. If the score was still tied after extra time, a penalty shoot-out would be used to determine the champions.

=== Bracket ===
Quarter-finals
Boca Juniors	2
Defensa y Justicia	0
Racing	5
Aldosivi	0
River Plate	1
Tigre	2
Estudiantes (LP)	1 (3)
Argentinos Juniors (p)	1 (4)

Semi-finals
Boca Juniors (p)	0 (6)
Racing	0 (5)
Tigre	1 (3)
Argentinos Juniors	1 (1)

Final
Boca Juniors	3
Tigre	0

=== Quarter-finals ===
Team 1	Score	Team 2
Racing	5–0	Aldosivi
Estudiantes (LP)	1–1 (3–4 p)	Argentinos Juniors
River Plate	1–2	Tigre
Boca Juniors	2–0	Defensa y Justicia

==== Matches ====
10 May 2022
19:15

Racing	5–0	Aldosivi
Alcaraz 2', 21'; Copetti 46' (pen.), 56'; Correa 77'	Report

Estadio Presidente Perón, Avellaneda
Referee: Yael Falcón Pérez

11 May 2022
19:15

Estudiantes (LP)	1–1	Argentinos Juniors
Boselli 31'	Report	Vera 64'
Penalties
Boselli (penalty scored); Díaz (penalty scored); Zuqui (penalty missed); Orosco (penalty scored); Morel (penalty missed)	3–4	(penalty scored) Torrén; (penalty scored) Ávalos; (penalty scored) Zalazar; (penalty missed) Reniero; (penalty scored) Vera

Estadio Jorge Luis Hirschi, La Plata
Referee: Fernando Echenique

11 May 2022
21:30

River Plate	1–2	Tigre
Fernández 57'	Report	Retegui 4'; Colidio 66'

Estadio Monumental Antonio Vespucio Liberti, Buenos Aires
Referee: Fernando Espinoza

10 May 2022
21:30

Boca Juniors	2–0	Defensa y Justicia
Villa 40'; Ramírez 77'	Report

La Bombonera, Buenos Aires
Referee: Andrés Merlos

=== Semi-finals ===
Team 1	Score	Team 2
Boca Juniors	0–0 (6–5 p)	Racing
Tigre	1–1 (3–1 p)	Argentinos Juniors

==== Matches ====
14 May 2022
17:00

Boca Juniors	0–0	Racing
	Report
Penalties
Rojo (penalty scored); Izquierdoz (penalty scored); Fernández (penalty scored); Benedetto (penalty scored); Salvio (penalty missed); Villa (penalty scored); Varela (penalty scored)	6–5	(penalty scored) Piovi; (penalty scored) Cardona; (penalty scored) Chancalay; (penalty scored) Alcaraz; (penalty missed) Copetti; (penalty scored) Correa; (penalty missed) Insúa

Estadio Ciudad de Lanús – Néstor Díaz Pérez, Lanús
Referee: Facundo Tello

15 May 2022
16:00

Tigre	1–1	Argentinos Juniors
Castro 54'	Report	Ávalos 87'
Penalties
Magnín (penalty scored); Prieto (penalty scored); Blondel (penalty scored)	3–1	(penalty missed) Vera; (penalty scored) Ávalos; (penalty missed) Zalazar; (penalty missed) Reniero

Estadio Tomás Adolfo Ducó, Buenos Aires
Referee: Andrés Merlos

=== Final ===
Team 1	Score	Team 2
Boca Juniors	3–0	Tigre

==== Match ====
22 May 2022
16:00

Boca Juniors	3–0	Tigre
Rojo 45+3'; Fabra 67'; Vázquez 85'	Report

Estadio Mario Alberto Kempes, Córdoba
Referee: Darío Herrera

== Season statistics ==
=== Top goalscorers ===
Rank	Player	Club	Goals
1	(Argentina) Mauro Boselli	Estudiantes (LP)	10
2	(Uruguay) Martín Cauteruccio	Aldosivi	9
3	(Argentina) Cristian Tarragona	Gimnasia y Esgrima (LP)	8
3	(Argentina) Enzo Copetti	Racing	8
3	(Argentina) Julián Álvarez	River Plate	8
6	(Argentina) Sebastián Lomonaco	Arsenal	7
6	(Argentina) Darío Benedetto	Boca Juniors	7
6	(Uruguay) Renzo López	Central Córdoba (SdE)	7
6	(Uruguay) Miguel Merentiel	Defensa y Justicia	7
6	(Uruguay) Matías Cóccaro	Huracán	7
6	(Argentina) Enzo Fernández	River Plate	7
6	(Argentina) Lucas Janson	Vélez Sarsfield	7

Source: AFA

=== Top assists ===
Rank	Player	Club	Goals
1	(Colombia) Sebastián Villa	Boca Juniors	8
2	(Argentina) Lucas Brochero	Arsenal	5
2	(Argentina) Fernando Zuqui	Estudiantes (LP)	5
2	(Argentina) Franco Cristaldo	Huracán	5
2	(Argentina) Víctor Malcorra	Lanús	5
2	(Argentina) Enzo Fernández	River Plate	5
7	(Paraguay) Gabriel Ávalos	Argentinos Juniors	4
7	(Argentina) Walter Bou	Defensa y Justicia	4
7	(Argentina) Francisco Pizzini	Defensa y Justicia	4
7	(Argentina) Carlos Rotondi	Defensa y Justicia	4
7	(Argentina) Gustavo Del Prete	Estudiantes (LP)	4
7	(Argentina) Martín Ojeda	Godoy Cruz	4
7	(Argentina) Francisco González	Newell's Old Boys	4
7	(Argentina) Tomás Chancalay	Racing	4

Source: AFA
