= 2023 Club Atlético Boca Juniors season =

Boca Juniors
2023 season
- President: Jorge Amor Ameal
- Manager: Hugo Ibarra (until 28 March); Mariano Herrón (interim, from 29 March, until 9 April); Jorge Almirón (from 10 April)
- Stadium: Estadio Alberto J. Armando
- Primera División: 7th
- Copa de la Liga Profesional: TBD
- Copa Argentina: TBD
- Supercopa Argentina: Winners
- Trofeo de Campeones de la Liga Profesional: TBD
- Supercopa Internacional: Runner-Up
- Copa Libertadores: TBD
Home colours	Away colours	Third colours

The 2023 Club Atlético Boca Juniors season is the 95th consecutive season in the top flight of Argentine football. In addition to the domestic league, Boca Juniors will participate in this season's editions of the Copa de la Liga Profesional, the Supercopa Argentina, the Copa Argentina, the Trofeo de Campeones de la Liga Profesional and the 2023 Copa Libertadores.

== Season overview ==
=== January ===
Ezequiel Fernández and Nicolás Valentini return from their loans. Boca and Carlos Zambrano agreed to mutually terminate the forward's contract, Zambrano subsequently joined Alianza Lima. Nazareno Solís returns from Alvarado, and is loaned again, to Patronato. Defender Bruno Valdez arrives as a free agent. Boca started the season losing 1–2 against Racing in the Supercopa Internacional. Agustín Rossi is loaned until the end of the season to Al Nassr. Boca won 1–0 against Atlético Tucumán the first match of Primera Division. Aaron Molinas is loaned until the end of the season to Tigre.

=== February ===
Miguel Merentiel is loaned until the end of the season from Palmeiras. On February 5, Boca drew 0–0 against Central Córdoba (SdE). On February 11 Boca lost 1–2 against Talleres (C). On February 19 Boca won 3–1 against Platense. On February 25 Boca won 2–1 against Vélez Sarsfield.

=== March ===
On march 1 Boca defeated Patronato 3-0 and won their second Supercopa Argentina. On march 6, Boca drew 0–0 against Defensa y Justicia. On march 12 Boca lost 0–1 against Banfield. On march 19 Boca lost 2–3 against Instituto. On march 25, Boca defeated Olimpo 2-1 and advanced to the round of 32 of Copa Argentina. On March 28, Hugo Ibarra is sacked and Mariano Herrón is appointed as interim manager.

=== April ===
On April 1 Boca defeated Barracas Central 3-0. On the first match of Copa Libertadores Boca drew 0–0 against Monagas in Venezuela. On April 9 Boca lost 1–2 against Colón. Jorge Almirón is appointed as new manager. On April 12 Boca lost 0–1 against San Lorenzo. On April 15 Boca lost 0–1 against Estudiantes. On April 18 Boca defeated Deportivo Pereira 2–1 in Copa Libertadores. On April 23 Boca drew 2–2 against Rosario Central. On April 29 Boca defeated Racing Club 3-1.

=== May ===
On may 3 Boca defeated Colo-Colo 2–0 in Copa Libertadores. On may 7 Boca lost 1-0 the Superclásico against River Plate. On may 14 Boca defeated Belgrano 2-0. On may 24 Boca lost 0–1 against Deportivo Pereira in Copa Libertadores. On may 28 Boca defeated Tigre 1-0.

=== June ===
On June 1 Boca lost 0–1 against Arsenal. On June 6 Boca defeated Colo-Colo 1–0 in Copa Libertadores and qualified to the final stages. On June 10 Boca drew 1–1 against Lanús. On June 22 Boca lost 0–4 against Godoy Cruz. On June 29 Boca defeated Venezuelan Monagas 4–0 in Copa Libertadores. Martín Payero ended his loan with Boca and returned to his club. Agustín Almendra ended his contract with the club.

=== July ===
Agustín Rossi, Jorman Campuzano, Vicente Taborda and Jan Carlos Hurtado return from their loans. Rossi is transferred to Flamengo. On July 2 Boca defeated Sarmiento (J) 2-0. On July 6 Boca drew 0–0 against Unión. On July 10 Boca defeated Huracán 1-0. On July 16 Boca defeated Gimnasia y Esgrima (LP) 3-1. On July 20, Boca defeated Barracas Central 2-1 and advanced to the round of 16 of Copa Argentina. On July 24 Boca defeated Newell's Old Boys 2-1. Defender Lucas Blondel arrives from Tigre and forward Lucas Janson arrives from Vélez Sarsfield. Luis Vázquez is transferred to Anderlecht. Mateo Retegui, who was on loan at Tigre, is transferred to Genoa. Boca and Óscar Romero agreed to mutually terminate the midfielder's contract, Romero subsequently joined Pendikspor. Jan Carlos Hurtado is loaned to LDU Quito. Edinson Cavani joins the club, on a free transfer from Valencia. On July 29 Boca defeated Independiente 2-0, ending the Primera Division tournament in the seventh position.

=== August ===
Marcelo Saracchi arrives from Levante. On the first leg of round of 16 of Copa Libertadores, Boca drew 0–0 against Uruguayan Nacional. After a 4–2 win on penalties, Boca defeated Nacional and advanced to the quarterfinals of Copa Libertadores.

== Current squad ==
Last updated on August 9, 2023.

Squad no.	Name	Nationality	Position	Date of birth (Age)	Apps	Goals	Last team	Note
Goalkeepers
1	Sergio Romero	(Argentina)	GK	February 22, 1987 (age 39)	32	-25	(Italy) Venezia	
12	Leandro Brey	(Argentina)	GK	September 21, 2002 (age 24)	1	0	(Argentina) Los Andes	
13	Javier García	(Argentina)	GK	January 29, 1987 (age 39)	68	-81	(Argentina) Racing	
Defenders
2	Facundo Roncaglia	(Argentina)	DF	February 10, 1987 (age 39)	124	7	(Cyprus) Aris Limassol	
3	Agustín Sández	(Argentina)	DF	January 16, 2001 (age 25)	45	2	(Argentina) Youth team	
4	Nicolás Figal	(Argentina)	DF	April 3, 1994 (age 32)	59	3	(United States) Inter Miami	
6	Marcos Rojo (C)	(Argentina)	DF	March 20, 1990 (age 36)	61	6	(England) Manchester United	
15	Nicolás Valentini	(Argentina)	DF	April 6, 2001 (age 25)	23	1	(Argentina) Aldosivi	
17	Luis Advíncula	(Peru)	DF	March 2, 1990 (age 36)	88	4	(Spain) Rayo Vallecano	
18	Frank Fabra (VC 3º)	(Colombia)	DF	February 22, 1991 (age 35)	214	15	(Colombia) Independiente Medellín	
19	Valentín Barco	(Argentina)	DF	July 23, 2004 (age 22)	20	1	(Argentina) Youth team	
24	Lucas Blondel	(Argentina)	DF	September 14, 1996 (age 30)	0	0	(Argentina) Tigre	
25	Bruno Valdez	(Paraguay)	DF	October 6, 1992 (age 34)	24	0	(Mexico) América	
26	Marcelo Saracchi	(Argentina)	DF	April 23, 1998 (age 28)	0	0	(Spain) Levante	
35	Nahuel Génez	(Argentina)	DF	June 18, 2003 (age 23)	3	0	(Argentina) Youth team	
39	Gabriel Aranda	(Argentina)	DF	April 16, 2001 (age 25)	15	0	(Argentina) Youth team	
50	Aaron Anselmino	(Argentina)	DF	April 29, 2005 (age 21)	2	0	(Argentina) Youth team	
57	Marcelo Weigandt	(Argentina)	DF	April 6, 2001 (age 25)	63	3	(Argentina) Gimnasia y Esgrima (LP)	
Midfielders
5	Alan Varela (VC 4º)	(Argentina)	MF	July 4, 2001 (age 25)	111	2	(Argentina) Youth team	
8	Guillermo Fernández (VC 2º)	(Argentina)	MF	October 11, 1991 (age 35)	130	10	(Mexico) Cruz Azul	
14	Esteban Rolón	(Argentina)	MF	March 25, 1995 (age 31)	35	0	(Argentina) Huracán	
20	Juan Ramírez	(Argentina)	MF	May 25, 1993 (age 33)	87	2	(Argentina) San Lorenzo	
21	Ezequiel Fernández	(Argentina)	MF	July 25, 2002 (age 24)	29	0	(Argentina) Tigre	
23	Diego González	(Argentina)	MF	February 9, 1988 (age 38)	42	3	(Argentina) Racing Club	
27	Jorman Campuzano	(Argentina)	MF	April 30, 1996 (age 30)	99	2	(Turkey) Giresunspor	
31	Brandon Cortés	(Argentina)	MF	June 26, 2001 (age 25)	5	0	Universidad de Chile	
36	Cristian Medina	(Argentina)	MF	June 1, 2002 (age 24)	112	5	(Argentina) Youth team	
Forwards
7	Exequiel Zeballos	(Argentina)	FW	April 24, 2002 (age 24)	55	6	(Argentina) Youth team	
9	Darío Benedetto	(Argentina)	FW	May 17, 1990 (age 36)	141	68	(France) Olympique de Marseille	
10	Edinson Cavani	(Uruguay)	FW	February 14, 1987 (age 39)	1	0	(Spain) Valencia	
11	Lucas Janson	(Argentina)	FW	August 16, 1994 (age 32)	1	0	(Argentina) Vélez Sarsfield	
16	Miguel Merentiel	(Uruguay)	FW	February 24, 1996 (age 30)	34	9	(Brazil) Palmeiras	
22	Sebastián Villa	(Colombia)	FW	May 19, 1996 (age 30)	172	29	(Colombia) Deportes Tolima	
28	Gonzalo Morales	(Argentina)	FW	April 4, 2003 (age 23)	9	2	(Argentina) Youth team	
29	Norberto Briasco	(Armenia)	FW	February 29, 1996 (age 30)	45	4	(Argentina) Huracán	
33	Nicolás Orsini	(Argentina)	FW	September 12, 1994 (age 32)	36	3	(Argentina) Lanús	
41	Luca Langoni	(Argentina)	FW	February 9, 2002 (age 24)	38	10	(Argentina) Youth team	

== Transfers ==
=== Summer ===
==== In ====
Players transferred
Pos.	Name	Club	Fee
DF	(Paraguay) Bruno Valdez	(Mexico) América	Free

Players loaned
Pos.	Name	Club	End date
FW	(Uruguay) Miguel Merentiel	(Brazil) Palmeiras	December 2023

Loan Return
Pos.	Name	Return from
DF	(Argentina) Nicolás Valentini	(Argentina) Aldosivi
MF	(Argentina) Ezequiel Fernández	(Argentina) Tigre
FW	(Argentina) Nazareno Solís	(Argentina) Alvarado

==== Out ====
Players transferred
Pos.	Name	Club	Fee
DF	(Peru) Carlos Zambrano	(Peru) Alianza Lima	Free

Players loaned
Pos.	Name	Club	End date
GK	(Argentina) Agustín Rossi	(Saudi Arabia) Al Nassr	June 2023
MF	(Argentina) Aaron Molinas	(Argentina) Tigre	December 2023
FW	(Argentina) Nazareno Solís	(Argentina) Patronato	December 2023

Loan return
Pos.	Name	Return to

=== Winter ===
==== In ====
Players transferred
Pos.	Name	Club	Fee
DF	(Argentina) Lucas Blondel	(Argentina) Tigre	$1.850.000
DF	(Uruguay) Marcelo Saracchi	(Spain) Levante	Undisclosed
FW	(Uruguay) Edinson Cavani	(Spain) Valencia	Free
FW	(Argentina) Lucas Janson	(Argentina) Vélez Sarsfield	Undisclosed

Players loaned
Pos.	Name	Club	End date

Loan Return
Pos.	Name	Return from
GK	(Argentina) Agustín Rossi	(Saudi Arabia) Al Nassr
MF	(Colombia) Jorman Campuzano	(Turkey) Giresunspor
FW	(Venezuela) Jan Carlos Hurtado	(Brazil) Red Bull Bragantino
FW	(Argentina) Vicente Taborda	(Argentina) Platense

==== Out ====
Players transferred
Pos.	Name	Club	Fee
GK	(Argentina) Agustín Rossi	(Brazil) Flamengo	Undisclosed
MF	(Argentina) Agustín Almendra	(Argentina) Racing Club	Free
MF	(Paraguay) Óscar Romero	(Turkey) Pendikspor	Free
FW	(Argentina) Mateo Retegui	(Italy) Genoa	Undisclosed
FW	(Argentina) Luis Vázquez	(Belgium) Anderlecht	Undisclosed

Players loaned
Pos.	Name	Club	End date
FW	(Venezuela) Jan Carlos Hurtado	(Ecuador) LDU Quito	June 2024

Loan return
Pos.	Name	Return to
MF	(Argentina) Martín Payero	(England) Middlesbrough

== Competitions ==
=== Overall ===
Competition	First match	Last match	Starting round	Final position	Record							
Competition	First match	Last match	Starting round	Final position	Pld	W	D	L	GF	GA	GD	Win %
Primera División	29 January 2023	29 July 2023	Matchday 1	7th	27	13	5	9	33	24	+9	48.15
Copa de la Liga Profesional	20 August 2023	TBD	Group stage	TBD	0	0	0	0	0	0	+0	—
Copa Argentina	25 March 2023	TBD	Round of 64	TBD	2	2	0	0	4	2	+2	100.00
Supercopa Argentina	1 March 2023		Final	Winners	1	1	0	0	3	0	+3	100.00
2020 Trofeo de Campeones	TBD	TBD	TBD	TBD	0	0	0	0	0	0	+0	—
Supercopa Internacional	20 January 2023		Final	Runners-Up	1	0	0	1	1	2	−1	0.00
Copa Libertadores	6 April 2023	TBD	Group stage	TBD	8	4	3	1	11	4	+7	50.00
Total					39	20	8	11	52	32	+20	51.28

Last updated: August 9, 2023.
Source: Competitions

=== Primera División ===
==== League table ====
Pos	Team	Pld	W	D	L	GF	GA	GD	Pts
5	Estudiantes (LP)	27	12	9	6	35	24	+11	45
6	Defensa y Justicia	27	12	8	7	36	23	+13	44
7	Boca Juniors	27	13	5	9	33	24	+9	44
8	Rosario Central	27	10	12	5	36	29	+7	42
9	Godoy Cruz	27	11	8	8	37	32	+5	41

Source: AFA
Rules for classification: 1) points; 2) goal difference; 3) goals scored; 4) fair play ranking 5) drawing of lots.

==== Relegation table ====
Pos	Team	2021 Pts	2022 Pts	2023 Pts	Total Pts	Total Pld	Avg	Relegation
1	River Plate	75	76	61	212	106	2	
2	Boca Juniors	63	79	44	186	106	1.755	
3	Racing	53	80	36	169	106	1.594	

==== Results summary ====
Overall								Home						Away					
Pld	W	D	L	GF	GA	GD	Pts	W	D	L	GF	GA	GD	W	D	L	GF	GA	GD
27	13	5	9	33	24	+9	44	8	3	3	19	10	+9	5	2	6	14	14	0

Source: AFA

==== Results by round ====
Round	1	2	3	4	5	6	7	8	9	10	11	12	13	14	15	16	17	18	19	20	21	22	23	24	25	26	27
Ground	H	H	A	H	A	H	A	H	A	H	A	H	A	H	A	H	A	H	A	H	A	H	A	H	A	H	A
Result	W	D	L	W	W	D	L	L	W	L	L	L	D	W	L	W	W	W	L	D	L	W	D	W	W	W	W
Position	6	10	17	7	6	7	8	14	12	12	18	19	17	13	14	13	10	9	10	11	14	11	11	9	8	8	7

Source: AFA
A = Away; H = Home; W = Win; D = Draw; L = Loss

==== Matches ====
Win Draw Loss Postponed

January 29, 2023 1	Boca Juniors	1–0	Atlético Tucumán	Buenos Aires
21:30 UTC−3	Figal (yellow card) 64'; Ó. Romero 68'	Report	Pereyra (yellow card) 32'; Estigarribia (yellow card) 45+1'; Marchiori (yellow card) 52'; Di Franco (yellow card) 79'	Stadium: La Bombonera; Referee: Jorge Baliño

February 5, 2023 2	Boca Juniors	0–0	Central Córdoba (SdE)	Buenos Aires
19:15 UTC−3	S. Romero (yellow card) 63'; Figal (yellow card) 67'; Valdez (yellow card) 90+2'	Report	Pereyra (yellow card) 24'; Castelli (penalty missed) 65'; Kalinski (yellow card) 88'	Stadium: La Bombonera; Referee: Andrés Merlos

February 11, 2023 3	Talleres (C)	2–1	Boca Juniors	Córdoba
21:30 UTC−3	Santos 27'; E. Fernández 51' (o.g.); Benavídez (yellow card) 82'; Valoyes (yellow card) 85'	Report	Varela (yellow card) 33'; G. Fernández (yellow card) 34'; Villa (red card) 54'; Langoni 82'; Figal (yellow card) 85'	Stadium: Mario Alberto Kempes; Referee: Darío Herrera

February 19, 2023 4	Boca Juniors	3–1	Platense	Buenos Aires
19:15 UTC−3	Figal 9'; Valdez (yellow card) 31'; Merentiel 35'; Varela (yellow card) 42'; Briasco 74'	Report	Servetto 11'; Cacciabue (yellow card) 33'; Castro (yellow card) 38'	Stadium: La Bombonera

February 25, 2023 5	Vélez Sarsfield	1–2	Boca Juniors	Buenos Aires
21:30 UTC−3	Florentín (yellow card) 19'; Janson 65' (pen.); Godín (yellow card) 84'; Gianetti (yellow card) 87'	Report	Sández (yellow card) 20'; Langoni 31'; Payero (yellow card) 58'; Fabra (yellow card) 63'; E. Fernández (red card) 67'; Advíncula (yellow card) 69'; Figal 86'; Merentiel (yellow card) 90+4'	Stadium: José Amalfitani Stadium; Referee: Yael Falcón Pérez

March 6, 2023 6	Boca Juniors	0–0	Defensa y Justicia	Buenos Aires
21:00 UTC−3	G. Fernández (yellow card) 90+4'	Report	Escalante (yellow card) 2'; Miritello (yellow card) 57'; Cardona (yellow card) 64'; Mosquera (yellow card) 71'; Benítez (yellow card) 84'; Sant'Anna (yellow card) 89'	Stadium: La Bombonera; Referee: Fernando Espinoza

March 12, 2023 7	Banfield	1–0	Boca Juniors	Banfield
21:30 UTC−3	Chávez (penalty missed) 22'; Quirós 28'; Coronel (yellow card) 56'; Alemán (yellow card) 71'; Souto (yellow card) 90'	Report	Romero (yellow card) 43'; Varela (yellow card) 69'	Stadium: Florencio Solá; Referee: Hernán Mastrángelo

March 19, 2023 8	Boca Juniors	2–3	Instituto	Buenos Aires
19:00 UTC−3	Payero 45+1'; Valdez (yellow card) 67'; Merentiel 84'; Weigandt (yellow card) 85'	Report	J. Varela 11'; Martínez 18'; Cerato (yellow card) 45'; S. Rodríguez 46'; A. Rodríguez (yellow card) 85'; Carranza (yellow card) 86'; Bay (yellow card) 86'; Alarcón (yellow card) 88'	Stadium: La Bombonera; Referee: Jorge Baliño

April 1, 2023 9	Barracas Central	0–3	Boca Juniors	Buenos Aires
15:30 UTC−3	Herrera (yellow card) 23'; Mater (yellow card) 43'; Colitto (yellow card) 72'	Report	Dattola 11' (o.g.); Langoni 33'; G. Fernández 40' (yellow card) 70'; Roncaglia (yellow card) 77'	Stadium: Claudio Tapia; Referee: Yael Falcón Pérez

April 9, 2023 10	Boca Juniors	1–2	Colón	Buenos Aires
21:30 UTC−3	Romero (yellow card) 45' (goal) 75'; Fabra (yellow card) 67'	Report	Ábila 0'; J. Chicco (yellow card) 44'; Perlaza (yellow card) 71'; Ibáñez (yellow card) 86'; Teuten 90'; Pierotti (yellow card) 90+5'	Stadium: La Bombonera; Referee: Leandro Rey Hilfer

April 12, 2023 11	San Lorenzo	1–0	Boca Juniors	Buenos Aires
16:30 UTC−3	G. Fernández 8' (o.g.); Gattoni (yellow card) 32'; Braida (yellow card) 38'; Giay (yellow card) 76'; Blandi (yellow card) 90+4'	Report	Advíncula (yellow card) 30'; Figal (yellow card) 44' (yellow-red card) 59'; Villa (yellow card) 44'; Sández (yellow card) 45+6'; Valentini (yellow card) 58'	Stadium: Pedro Bidegain; Referee: Facundo Tello

April 15, 2023 12	Boca Juniors	0–1	Estudiantes (LP)	Buenos Aires
19:00 UTC−3	E. Fernández (yellow card) 9'; Medina (yellow card) 59'; Varela (yellow card) 80'; Barco (yellow card) 90+2'	Report	Ascacíbar (yellow card) 35'; Zuqui (yellow card) 45+2'; Godoy (yellow card) 75'; Boselli 84'	Stadium: La Bombonera; Referee: Pablo Echavarría

April 23, 2023 13	Rosario Central	2–2	Boca Juniors	Rosario
15:30 UTC−3	Martínez (yellow card) 20'; Giaccone 24'; Véliz 68'; Broun (yellow card) 73'; Montoya (yellow card) 77'; Mallo (yellow card) 77'	Report	Barco (yellow card) 20'; Valentini (yellow card) 43'; G. Fernández (yellow card) 57'; Payero 63'; Advíncula (yellow card) 77'; Figal 90+9'	Stadium: Gigante de Arroyito; Referee: Ariel Penel

April 29, 2023 14	Boca Juniors	3–1	Racing	Buenos Aires
21:30 UTC−3	Payero 2' (red card) 60'; G. Fernández 5'; Roncaglia (yellow card) 30'; Barco (yellow card) 53'; Merentiel 89'	Report	Nardoni (red card) 60'; Arias (yellow card) 60'; Reniero 68'; Moreno (yellow card) 90+4'	Stadium: La Bombonera; Referee: Andrés Merlos

May 7, 2023 15	River Plate	1–0	Boca Juniors	Buenos Aires
17:30 UTC−3	Aliendro (yellow card) 3'; González Pirez (yellow card) 14'; Díaz (yellow card) 34'; Pérez (yellow card) 45'; Casco (yellow card) 66'; Borja 90+2' (pen.); Palavecino (red card) 90+12'; Centurión (red card) 90+13'; Gómez (red card) 90+13'	Report	G. Fernández (yellow card) 20'; Varela (yellow card) 39'; Figal (yellow card) 40'; E. Fernández (yellow card) 90+2' (red card) 90+13'; Merentiel (red card) 90+13'; Valentini (red card) 90+13'	Stadium: Monumental Antonio Vespucio Liberti; Referee: Darío Herrera

May 14, 2023 16	Boca Juniors	2–0	Belgrano	Buenos Aires
19:00 UTC−3	Payero 48' (yellow card) 59'; Benedetto 53'; Roncaglia (yellow card) 58'	Report	Meriano (yellow card) 35'	Stadium: La Bombonera; Referee: Fernando Espinoza

May 19, 2023 17	Argentinos Juniors	0–1	Boca Juniors	Buenos Aires
21:30 UTC−3	Di Cesare (yellow card) 39'; Villalba (yellow card) 85'	Report	Ramírez (yellow card) 37'; Benedetto (yellow card) 43'; Merentiel 88'	Stadium: Diego Armando Maradona; Referee: Fernando Echenique

May 28, 2023 18	Boca Juniors	1–0	Tigre	Buenos Aires
19:00 UTC−3	Merentiel 12'; Fabra (yellow card) 78'	Report	Molinas (yellow card) 27'; Luciatti (yellow card) 53'; Menossi (yellow card) 90+4'	Stadium: La Bombonera; Referee: Nicolás Ramírez

June 1, 2023 19	Arsenal	1–0	Boca Juniors	Sarandí
21:30 UTC−3	Pombo 24'; Muscia (yellow card) 80'	Report	Valdez (yellow card) 35'; Weigandt (red card) 51'	Stadium: Julio H. Grondona; Referee: Leandro Rey Hilfer

June 10, 2023 20	Boca Juniors	1–1	Lanús	Buenos Aires
20:00 UTC−3	Medina (yellow card) 33'; Benedetto 90'; Varela (yellow card) 90+3'	Report	Díaz 45'; Orozco (yellow card) 48'; Cáceres (yellow card) 51'; Lema (yellow card) 83'; Esquivel (yellow card) 85'; Aguirre (yellow card) 90+5'	Stadium: La Bombonera; Referee: Fernando Echenique

June 22, 2023 21	Godoy Cruz	4–0	Boca Juniors	Mendoza
21:45 UTC−3	Rodríguez 16' (pen.); López (yellow card) 31' (goal) 38'; Allende 58'; Conechny 64'; Barrios (yellow card) 73'	Report	Weigandt (yellow card) 15'	Stadium: Malvinas Argentinas; Referee: Facundo Tello

July 2, 2023 22	Boca Juniors	2–0	Sarmiento (J)	Buenos Aires
19:00 UTC−3	Varela (yellow card) 56'; Merentiel 70'; G. Fernández (yellow card) 83'; Medina 83'	Report	García (yellow card) 28'; Méndez (yellow card) 56'; Hernández (yellow card) 74'	Stadium: La Bombonera; Referee: Silvio Trucco

July 6, 2023 23	Unión	0–0	Boca Juniors	Santa Fe
16:30 UTC−3	Paz (yellow card) 9'	Report	G. Fernández (yellow card) 20'; Rolón (red card) 73'; Figal (yellow card) 80'; Varela (yellow card) 88'; Medina (yellow card) 90'	Stadium: 15 de Abril; Referee: Andrés Merlos

July 10, 2023 24	Boca Juniors	1–0	Huracán	Buenos Aires
19:30 UTC−3	Varela (yellow card) 38'; Vázquez 56'; Valentini (yellow card) 63'; E. Fernández (yellow card) 86'; G. Fernández (yellow card) 90+5'	Report	Benítez (yellow card) 24'; Godoy (red card) 89'	Stadium: La Bombonera; Referee: Nicolás Ramírez

July 16, 2023 25	Gimnasia y Esgrima (LP)	1–3	Boca Juniors	La Plata
16:30 UTC−3	Bazzi (yellow card) 19'; Lescano (yellow card) 84'; Castillo 89'; E. Ramírez (yellow card) 19'	Report	Fabra (yellow card) 23'; G. Fernández (yellow card) 27'; Merentiel 38'; Medina 73'; Benedetto 75' (yellow card) 87'; Varela (yellow card) 90+5'	Stadium: Juan Carmelo Zerillo; Referee: Hernán Mastrángelo

July 24, 2023 26	Boca Juniors	2–1	Newell's Old Boys	Buenos Aires
20:45 UTC−3	Hoyos 20' (o.g.); Medina 46' (yellow card) 83'; Valentini (yellow card) 54'; Merentiel (yellow card) 57'; G. Fernández (yellow card) 61'; Valdez (yellow card) 72'	Report	Mosquera (yellow card) 69'; Recalde (yellow card) 84' (goal) 90+1'	Stadium: La Bombonera; Referee: Fernando Echenique

July 29, 2023 27	Independiente	0–2	Boca Juniors	Avellaneda
17:00 UTC−3	Martínez (yellow card) 25'; Báez (yellow card) 25'; Barcia (yellow card) 50'; Marcone (yellow card) 65'; Cauteruccio (penalty missed) 74'; Ortíz (yellow card) 84'	Report	E. Fernández (yellow card) 35'; Merentiel (yellow card) 62'; Zeballos 71'; Valentini 76'	Stadium: Libertadores de América; Referee: Nicolás Ramírez

=== Copa de la Liga Profesional ===
==== Group stage ====
===== Zone 2 =====
Pos	Team	Pld	W	D	L	GF	GA	GD	Pts	Qualification
1	Belgrano	0	0	0	0	0	0	0	0	Advance to Quarter-finals
2	Boca Juniors	0	0	0	0	0	0	0	0	Advance to Quarter-finals
3	Central Córdoba (SdE)	0	0	0	0	0	0	0	0	Advance to Quarter-finals
4	Defensa y Justicia	0	0	0	0	0	0	0	0	Advance to Quarter-finals
5	Estudiantes (LP)	0	0	0	0	0	0	0	0	
6	Godoy Cruz	0	0	0	0	0	0	0	0	
7	Lanús	0	0	0	0	0	0	0	0	
8	Newell's Old Boys	0	0	0	0	0	0	0	0	
9	Platense	0	0	0	0	0	0	0	0	
10	Racing	0	0	0	0	0	0	0	0	
11	San Lorenzo	0	0	0	0	0	0	0	0	
12	Sarmiento (J)	0	0	0	0	0	0	0	0	
13	Tigre	0	0	0	0	0	0	0	0	
14	Unión	0	0	0	0	0	0	0	0	

Source: AFA

==== International Qualification ====
Pos	Team	Pld	W	D	L	GF	GA	GD	Pts	Qualification or relegation
5	Estudiantes (LP)	27	12	9	6	35	24	+11	45	Qualification for Copa Sudamericana group stage
6	Defensa y Justicia	27	12	8	7	36	23	+13	44	Qualification for Copa Sudamericana group stage
7	Boca Juniors	27	13	5	9	33	24	+9	44	Qualification for Copa Sudamericana group stage
8	Rosario Central	27	10	12	5	36	29	+7	42	Qualification for Copa Sudamericana group stage
9	Godoy Cruz	27	11	8	8	37	32	+5	41	Qualification for Copa Sudamericana group stage

Updated to match(es) played on 30 July 2023. Source: AFA
Rules for classification: 1) points; 2) goal difference; 3) goals scored; 4) fair play ranking 5) drawing of lots.

===== Results summary =====
Overall								Home						Away					
Pld	W	D	L	GF	GA	GD	Pts	W	D	L	GF	GA	GD	W	D	L	GF	GA	GD
0	0	0	0	0	0	0	0	0	0	0	0	0	0	0	0	0	0	0	0

Source: AFA

===== Results by round =====
Round	1	2	3	4	5	6	7	8	9	10	11	12	13	14
Ground	H	A	H	H	A	H	H	A	H	A	H	A	H	A
Result														
Position														

Source: AFA
A = Away; H = Home; W = Win; D = Draw; L = Loss

====== Matches ======
Win Draw Loss Postponed

2023 1	Boca Juniors	v	Platense	Buenos Aires
19:00 UTC−3		Report		Stadium: La Bombonera

2023 2	Sarmiento (J)	v	Boca Juniors	Junín
15:45 UTC−3		Report		Stadium: Eva Perón

2023 3	Boca Juniors	v	Tigre	Buenos Aires
19:00 UTC−3		Report		Stadium: La Bombonera

2023 4	Boca Juniors	v	Defensa y Justicia	Buenos Aires
19:00 UTC−3		Report		Stadium: La Bombonera

2023 5	Central Córdoba (SdE)	v	Boca Juniors	Santiago del Estero
15:45 UTC−3		Report		Stadium: Único Madre de Ciudades

2023 6	Boca Juniors	v	Lanús	Buenos Aires
19:00 UTC−3		Report		Stadium: La Bombonera

2023 7	Boca Juniors	v	River Plate	Buenos Aires
19:00 UTC−3		Report		Stadium: La Bombonera

2023 8	Belgrano	v	Boca Juniors	Córdoba
15:45 UTC−3		Report		Stadium: Mario Alberto Kempes

2023 9	Boca Juniors	v	Unión	Buenos Aires
19:00 UTC−3		Report		Stadium: La Bombonera

2023 10	Racing	v	Boca Juniors	Avellaneda
15:45 UTC−3		Report		Stadium: Presidente Juan Domingo Perón

2023 11	Boca Juniors	v	Estudiantes (LP)	Buenos Aires
19:00 UTC−3		Report		Stadium: La Bombonera

2023 12	San Lorenzo	v	Boca Juniors	Buenos Aires
15:45 UTC−3		Report		Stadium: Pedro Bidegain

2023 11	Boca Juniors	v	Newell's Old Boys	Buenos Aires
19:00 UTC−3		Report		Stadium: La Bombonera

2023 14	Godoy Cruz	v	Boca Juniors	Mendoza
15:45 UTC−3		Report		Stadium: Malvinas Argentinas

=== Copa Argentina ===
==== Round of 64 ====
March 25, 2023	Boca Juniors	2–1	Olimpo	Chaco
20:10 UTC−3	Sández 35'; Benedetto 77' (pen.)	Report	Perotti (yellow card) 53'; Cevasco (yellow card) 76'; Hadad 89'	Stadium: Centenario; Referee: Lucas Comesaña

==== Round of 32 ====
July 20, 2023	Barracas Central	1–2	Boca Juniors	Santiago del Estero
19:00 UTC−3	Tapia (yellow card) 27'; Puig 64' (yellow card) 90'; Insúa (yellow card) 78'; Peinipil (yellow card) 90+3'	Report	Medina 45+1'; Merentiel 48'; Fabra (yellow card) 58'; Advíncula (yellow card) 78'; Rolón (yellow card) 88'	Stadium: Único Madre de Ciudades; Referee: Leandro Rey Hilfer

==== Round of 16 ====
2023	Almagro	v	Boca Juniors
UTC−3		Report

=== Supercopa Argentina ===
March 1, 2023	Boca Juniors	3–0	Patronato	Santiago del Estero
17:30 UTC−3	Roncaglia (yellow card) 29'; Benedetto 41', 51', 61'	Report	Nievas (yellow card) 25'; Vázquez (yellow card) 80'	Stadium: Estadio Único Madre de Ciudades; Referee: Andrés Merlos

=== Trofeo de Campeones ===
2023	Boca Juniors	v	TBD
17:30 UTC−3

=== Supercopa Internacional ===
January 20, 2023	Racing	2–1	Boca Juniors	Abu Dhabi
12:30 UTC−3	Carbonero 19' (yellow card) 89'; Oroz (yellow card) 37'; Piovi 90+7' (pen.)	Report	Roncaglia 16'	Stadium: Hazza bin Zayed Stadium; Referee: Fernando Rapallini

=== Copa Libertadores ===
==== Group stage ====
Pos	Team	Pld	W	D	L	GF	GA	GD	Pts	Qualification	BOC	PER	CCL	MON
1	(Argentina) Boca Juniors	6	4	1	1	9	2	+7	13	Advance to round of 16	—	2–1	1–0	4–0
2	(Colombia) Deportivo Pereira	6	2	2	2	5	5	0	8	Advance to round of 16	1–0	—	1–1	2–1
3	(Chile) Colo-Colo	6	1	3	2	3	5	−2	6	Transfer to Copa Sudamericana	0–2	0–0	—	1–0
4	(Venezuela) Monagas	6	1	2	3	3	8	−5	5		0–0	1–0	1–1	—

Source: CONMEBOL

April 5, 2023 1	Monagas (Venezuela)	0–0	(Argentina) Boca Juniors	Maturín, Venezuela
20:00 UTC−4	Basante (yellow card) 31'; Ramírez (yellow card) 51'; Cummings (yellow card) 75'	Report	Roncaglia (yellow card) 34' (yellow-red card) 86'; Valdez (red card) 40'; Benedetto (yellow card) 49'; Fabra (yellow card) 58'; Figal (yellow card) 74'	Stadium: Estadio Monumental de Maturín; Referee: Wilton Sampaio (Brazil)

April 19, 2023 2	Boca Juniors (Argentina)	2–1	(Colombia) Deportivo Pereira	Buenos Aires, Argentina
21:00 UTC−3	Valentini (yellow card) 36'; Varela (yellow card) 71' (goal) 90+9'; Payero (yellow card) 88'; Advíncula 89'; Merentiel (yellow card) 90+3'	Report	Án. Rodríguez (yellow card) 41'; C. Ramírez (yellow card) 45'; M. Medina (yellow card) 54' (yellow-red card) 90+1'; Fory 76'; Bocanegra (yellow card) 84'; Ar. Rodríguez (yellow card) 88'; Angulo (yellow card) 90+6'	Stadium: La Bombonera; Referee: Andrés Matonte (Uruguay)

May 3, 2023 3	Colo-Colo (Chile)	0–2	(Argentina) Boca Juniors	Santiago, Chile
20:00 UTC−4	Bouzat (yellow card) 44'; Fuentes (yellow card) 58'; Falcon (yellow card) 60'; Gutierrez (yellow card) 62'; Palacios (red card) 66'	Report	Advíncula 12'; Villa 64'; Roncaglia (yellow card) 69'; Barco (yellow card) 74'	Stadium: Estadio Monumental David Arellano; Referee: Raphael Claus (Brazil)

May 24, 2023 4	Deportivo Pereira (Colombia)	1–0	(Argentina) Boca Juniors	Pereira, Colombia
19:00 UTC−5	Quintero (yellow card) 9'; Fory (yellow card) 68'; Zuluaga (penalty missed) 76'; Ar. Rodríguez 78'; Bocanegra (yellow card) 80'; Án. Rodríguez (yellow card) 82'	Report	Briasco (yellow card) 33'; Weigandt (yellow card) 69'; Figal (yellow card) 74'	Stadium: Estadio Hernán Ramírez Villegas; Referee: Wagner Magalhães (Brazil)

June 6, 2023 5	Boca Juniors (Argentina)	1–0	(Chile) Colo-Colo	Buenos Aires, Argentina
21:00 UTC−3	Weigandt 55'	Report	Bouzat (yellow card) 9'; Rojas (yellow card) 38'; Pavez (yellow card) 45+5'; Wiemberg (yellow card) 57'	Stadium: La Bombonera; Referee: Anderson Daronco (Brazil)

June 29, 2023 6	Boca Juniors (Argentina)	4–0	(Venezuela) Monagas	Buenos Aires, Argentina
19:00 UTC−3	Valdez (yellow card) 18' (yellow-red card) 36'; Weigandt 39'; Barco 61' (yellow card) 62'; Vázquez 86', 89'	Report	Carrión (yellow card) 30'; Arroyo (yellow card) 44' (yellow-red card) 50'; Rodríguez (yellow card) 90+4'	Stadium: La Bombonera; Referee: Andrés Matonte (Uruguay)

==== Final Stages ====
August 2, 2023 First leg	Nacional (Uruguay)	0–0	(Argentina) Boca Juniors	Montevideo, Uruguay
21:00 UTC−3	Rodríguez (yellow card) 77'	Report	Zeballos (yellow card) 76'; Valentini (yellow card) 85'	Stadium: Estadio Gran Parque Central; Referee: Raphael Claus (Brazil)

August 9, 2022 Second leg	Boca Juniors (Argentina)	2–2 (2–2 agg.) (4–2 p)	(Uruguay) Nacional	Buenos Aires, Argentina
21:00 UTC−3	Merentiel 12'; Figal (yellow card) 27'; Advíncula (yellow card) 37' (goal) 47'; Barco (yellow card) 56'		Trezza 16' (yellow card) 50'; Rodríguez (yellow card) 56'; Damiani (yellow card) 75'; Ramírez 75'; Fagundez (yellow card) 56'	Stadium: La Bombonera; Referee: Anderson Daronco (Brazil)
	Penalties
	Zeballos (penalty scored); Benedetto (penalty scored); Valentini (penalty scored); G. Fernández (penalty missed); Barco (penalty scored)		(penalty missed) Ramírez; (penalty scored) Polenta; (penalty missed) Bocanegra; (penalty scored) Gigliotti

== Team statistics ==
	Total	Home	Away	Neutral
Games played	38	18	16	4
Games won	20	11	6	3
Games drawn	7	3	4	
Games lost	11	3	7	1
Biggest win	4-0 vs Monagas	4-0 vs Monagas	3-0 vs Barracas Central	3-0 vs Patronato
Biggest loss	0-4 vs Godoy Cruz	2-3 vs Instituto	0-4 vs Godoy Cruz	1-2 vs Racing
Biggest win (Primera División)	3-0 vs Barracas Central	3-1 vs Platense	3-0 vs Barracas Central	None
Biggest win (National Cups)	3-0 vs Patronato			3-0 vs Patronato
Biggest win (Copa Libertadores)	4-0 vs Monagas	4-0 vs Monagas	2-0 vs Colo-Colo	
Biggest loss (Primera División)	0-4 vs Godoy Cruz	2-3 vs Instituto	0-4 vs Godoy Cruz	None
Biggest loss (National Cups)	1-2 vs Racing			1-2 vs Racing
Biggest loss (Copa Libertadores)	0-1 vs Deportivo Pereira		0-1 vs Deportivo Pereira	
Clean sheets	17	9	7	1
Goals scored	50	26	16	8
Goals conceded	30	11	15	4
Goal difference	+20	+15	+1	+4
Yellow cards	92	40	48	4
Red cards	11	1	10	
Top scorer	Merentiel (8)	Merentiel (5)	Langoni (3)	Benedetto (4)
Penalties for	1			1
Penalties against	6	1	4	1

=== Season Appearances and goals ===
As of August 3, 2023

No.	Pos	Nat	Player	Total		Primera División		National Cups		Copa Libertadores	
No.	Pos	Nat	Player	Apps	Goals	Apps	Goals	Apps	Goals	Apps	Goals
Goalkeepers
1	GK	(Argentina) ARG	Sergio Romero	31	-23	23	-20	1	-1	7	-2
12	GK	(Argentina) ARG	Leandro Brey	0	0	0	0	0	0	0	0
13	GK	(Argentina) ARG	Javier García	7	-7	4	-4	3	-3	0	0
Defenders
2	DF	(Argentina) ARG	Facundo Roncaglia	22	1	9+6	0	3	1	3+1	0
3	DF	(Argentina) ARG	Agustín Sández	13	0	5+5	0	2	0	0+1	0
4	DF	(Argentina) ARG	Nicolás Figal	32	3	23+1	3	2	0	6	0
6	DF	(Argentina) ARG	Marcos Rojo	1	0	0	0	0	0	0+1	0
15	DF	(Argentina) ARG	Nicolás Valentini	21	1	11+4	1	1	0	3+2	0
17	DF	(Peru) PER	Luis Advíncula	27	2	16+2	0	3	0	5+1	2
18	DF	(Colombia) COL	Frank Fabra	27	0	16+3	0	3	0	5	0
19	DF	(Argentina) ARG	Valentín Barco	15	1	10	0	1	0	3+1	1
24	DF	(Argentina) ARG	Lucas Blondel	0	0	0	0	0	0	0	0
25	DF	(Paraguay) PAR	Bruno Valdez	23	0	16+2	0	1+1	0	3	0
26	DF	(Uruguay) URU	Marcelo Saracchi	0	0	0	0	0	0	0	0
35	DF	(Argentina) ARG	Nahuel Génez	1	0	0+1	0	0	0	0	0
39	DF	(Argentina) ARG	Gabriel Aranda	0	0	0	0	0	0	0	0
50	DF	(Argentina) ARG	Aaron Anselmino	2	0	0+2	0	0	0	0	0
57	DF	(Argentina) ARG	Marcelo Weigandt	22	2	14+1	0	1+1	0	4+1	2
Midfielders
5	MF	(Argentina) ARG	Alan Varela	34	1	20+4	0	3	0	7	1
8	MF	(Argentina) ARG	Guillermo Fernández	31	2	21+1	2	2	0	7	0
14	MF	(Argentina) ARG	Esteban Rolón	9	0	1+6	0	0+1	0	0+1	0
20	MF	(Argentina) ARG	Juan Ramírez	21	0	8+7	0	2+1	0	2+1	0
21	MF	(Argentina) ARG	Ezequiel Fernández	26	0	11+8	0	1+3	0	0+3	0
23	MF	(Argentina) ARG	Diego González	5	0	0+4	0	0+1	0	0	0
27	MF	(Colombia) COL	Jorman Campuzano	2	0	0	0	1	0	1	0
31	MF	(Argentina) ARG	Brandon Cortés	1	0	0+1	0	0	0	0	0
36	MF	(Argentina) ARG	Cristian Medina	31	4	14+9	3	2+1	1	3+2	0
Forwards
7	FW	(Argentina) ARG	Exequiel Zeballos	8	1	0+6	1	0+1	0	0+1	0
9	FW	(Argentina) ARG	Darío Benedetto	23	7	12+3	3	4	4	4	0
10	FW	(Uruguay) URU	Edinson Cavani	0	0	0	0	0	0	0	0
11	FW	(Argentina) ARG	Lucas Janson	1	0	0	0	0	0	0+1	0
16	FW	(Uruguay) URU	Miguel Merentiel	33	8	13+10	7	2+1	1	2+5	0
22	FW	(Colombia) COL	Sebastián Villa	25	1	15+3	0	2+1	0	4	1
28	FW	(Argentina) ARG	Gonzalo Morales	2	0	0+1	0	0+1	0	0	0
29	FW	(Armenia) ARM	Norberto Briasco	19	1	2+12	1	1+1	0	2+1	0
33	FW	(Argentina) ARG	Nicolás Orsini	4	0	3+1	0	0	0	0	0
41	FW	(Argentina) ARG	Luca Langoni	17	3	8+4	3	1+2	0	2	0
Players who have made an appearance or had a squad number this season, but have left the club
1	GK	(Argentina) ARG	Agustín Rossi	0	0	0	0	0	0	0	0
10	MF	(Paraguay) PAR	Óscar Romero	20	2	13+3	2	1	0	1+2	0
11	MF	(Argentina) ARG	Martín Payero	14	4	6+4	4	0	0	3+1	0
16	MF	(Argentina) ARG	Aaron Molinas	0	0	0	0	0	0	0	0
38	FW	(Argentina) ARG	Luis Vázquez	20	3	5+8	1	0+2	0	1+4	2

=== Top scorers ===
As of August 3, 2023

Rank	Pos.	No.	Player	Primera División	National Cups	Copa Libertadores	Total
1	FW	16	(Uruguay) Miguel Merentiel	7	1		8
2	FW	9	(Argentina) Darío Benedetto	3	4		7
3	MF	36	(Argentina) Cristian Medina	3	1		4
4	MF	11	(Argentina) Martín Payero	4			4
5	FW	38	(Armenia) Luis Vázquez	1		2	3
6	FW	41	(Argentina) Luca Langoni	3			3
7	DF	4	(Argentina) Nicolás Figal	3			3
8	MF	10	(Paraguay) Óscar Romero	2			2
9	MF	8	(Argentina) Guillermo Fernández	2			2
10	DF	57	(Argentina) Marcelo Weigandt			2	2
11	DF	17	(Peru) Luis Advíncula			2	1
12	FW	29	(Armenia) Norberto Briasco	1			1
13	DF	2	(Argentina) Facundo Roncaglia		1		1
14	DF	3	(Argentina) Agustín Sández		1		1
15	MF	5	(Argentina) Alan Varela			1	1
16	FW	22	(Colombia) Sebastián Villa			1	1
17	DF	19	(Argentina) Valentín Barco			1	1
18	FW	7	(Argentina) Exequiel Zeballos	1			1
19	DF	15	(Argentina) Nicolás Valentini	1			1
Own Goals				2			2
Totals				33	8	9	50

=== Top assists ===
As of August 3, 2023

Rank	Pos.	No.	Player	Primera División	National Cups	Copa Libertadores	Total
1	MF	10	(Paraguay) Óscar Romero	3	1	1	5
2	FW	22	(Colombia) Sebastián Villa	2		1	3
3	DF	17	(Peru) Luis Advíncula	3			3
4	FW	16	(Uruguay) Miguel Merentiel	2	1		3
5	DF	18	(Colombia) Frank Fabra	1	1	1	3
6	FW	9	(Argentina) Darío Benedetto	1	1		2
7	FW	38	(Argentina) Luis Vázquez	1		1	2
8	DF	57	(Argentina) Marcelo Weigandt	2			2
9	MF	8	(Argentina) Guillermo Fernández	2			2
10	MF	36	(Argentina) Cristian Medina	1	1		2
11	DF	19	(Argentina) Valentín Barco	1		1	2
12	FW	41	(Argentina) Luca Langoni	1			1
123	DF	3	(Argentina) Agustín Sández		1		1
14	DF	4	(Argentina) Nicolás Figal		1		1
15	FW	29	(Armenia) Norberto Briasco	1			1
16	MF	11	(Argentina) Martín Payero			1	1
17	MF	14	(Argentina) Esteban Rolón			1	1
18	MF	20	(Argentina) Juan Ramírez			1	1
19	MF	5	(Argentina) Alan Varela	1			1
20	FW	7	(Argentina) Exequiel Zeballos	1			1
Totals				24	7	8	39

=== Penalties ===
Date	Penalty Taker	Scored	Opponent	Competition
25 March 2022	Darío Benedetto	Yes	Olimpo	Copa Argentina

=== Clean sheets ===
As of August 3, 2023

Rank	Pos.	No.	Player	Primera División	National Cups	Copa Libertadores	Total
1	GK	1	(Argentina) Sergio Romero	10		5	15
2	GK	13	(Argentina) Javier García	1	1		2
Totals				12	1	4	17

=== Disciplinary record ===
As of August 3, 2023

No.	Pos	Nat	Player	Primera División			National Cups			Copa Libertadores			Total		
No.	Pos	Nat	Player	Yellow card	(yellow card) (yellow-red card)	Red card	Yellow card	(yellow card) (yellow-red card)	Red card	Yellow card	(yellow card) (yellow-red card)	Red card	Yellow card	(yellow card) (yellow-red card)	Red card
Goalkeepers
1	GK	(Argentina)	Sergio Romero	1									1		
12	GK	(Argentina)	Leandro Brey												
13	GK	(Argentina)	Javier García												
Defenders
2	DF	(Argentina)	Facundo Roncaglia	3			1			1	1		5	1	
3	DF	(Argentina)	Agustín Sández	2									2		
4	DF	(Argentina)	Nicolás Figal	5	1					2			7	1	
6	DF	(Argentina)	Marcos Rojo												
15	DF	(Argentina)	Nicolás Valentini	4		1				2			6		1
17	DF	(Peru)	Luis Advíncula	3			1						4		
18	DF	(Colombia)	Frank Fabra	4			1			1			6		
19	DF	(Argentina)	Valentín Barco	3						2			5		
24	DF	(Argentina)	Lucas Blondel												
25	DF	(Paraguay)	Bruno Valdez	5							1	1	5	1	1
24	DF	(Uruguay)	Marcelo Saracchi												
39	DF	(Argentina)	Gabriel Aranda												
57	DF	(Argentina)	Marcelo Weigandt	2		1				1			3		1
Midfielders
5	MF	(Argentina)	Alan Varela	10						1			11		
8	MF	(Argentina)	Guillermo Fernández	10									10		
14	MF	(Argentina)	Esteban Rolón			1	1						1		1
20	MF	(Argentina)	Juan Ramírez	1									1		
21	MF	(Argentina)	Ezequiel Fernández	4		2							4		2
23	MF	(Argentina)	Diego González												
27	MF	(Colombia)	Jorman Campuzano												
36	MF	(Argentina)	Cristian Medina	4									4		
Forwards
7	FW	(Argentina)	Exequiel Zeballos							1			1		
9	FW	(Argentina)	Darío Benedetto	2						1			3		
10	FW	(Uruguay)	Edinson Cavani												
11	FW	(Argentina)	Lucas Janson												
16	FW	(Uruguay)	Miguel Merentiel	3		1				1			4		1
22	FW	(Colombia)	Sebastián Villa	1		1								1	1
28	FW	(Argentina)	Gonzalo Morales												
29	FW	(Armenia)	Norberto Briasco							1			1		
33	FW	(Argentina)	Nicolás Orsini												
41	FW	(Argentina)	Luca Langoni												
Players who have made an appearance or had a squad number this season, but have left the club
1	GK	(Argentina)	Agustín Rossi												
10	MF	(Paraguay)	Óscar Romero	2									2		
11	MF	(Argentina)	Martín Payero	2		1				1			3		1
16	MF	(Argentina)	Aaron Molinas												
38	FW	(Argentina)	Luis Vázquez												
Total				71	1	7	4			15	2		90	3	9
