= 2020 Trofeo de Campeones de la Liga Profesional =

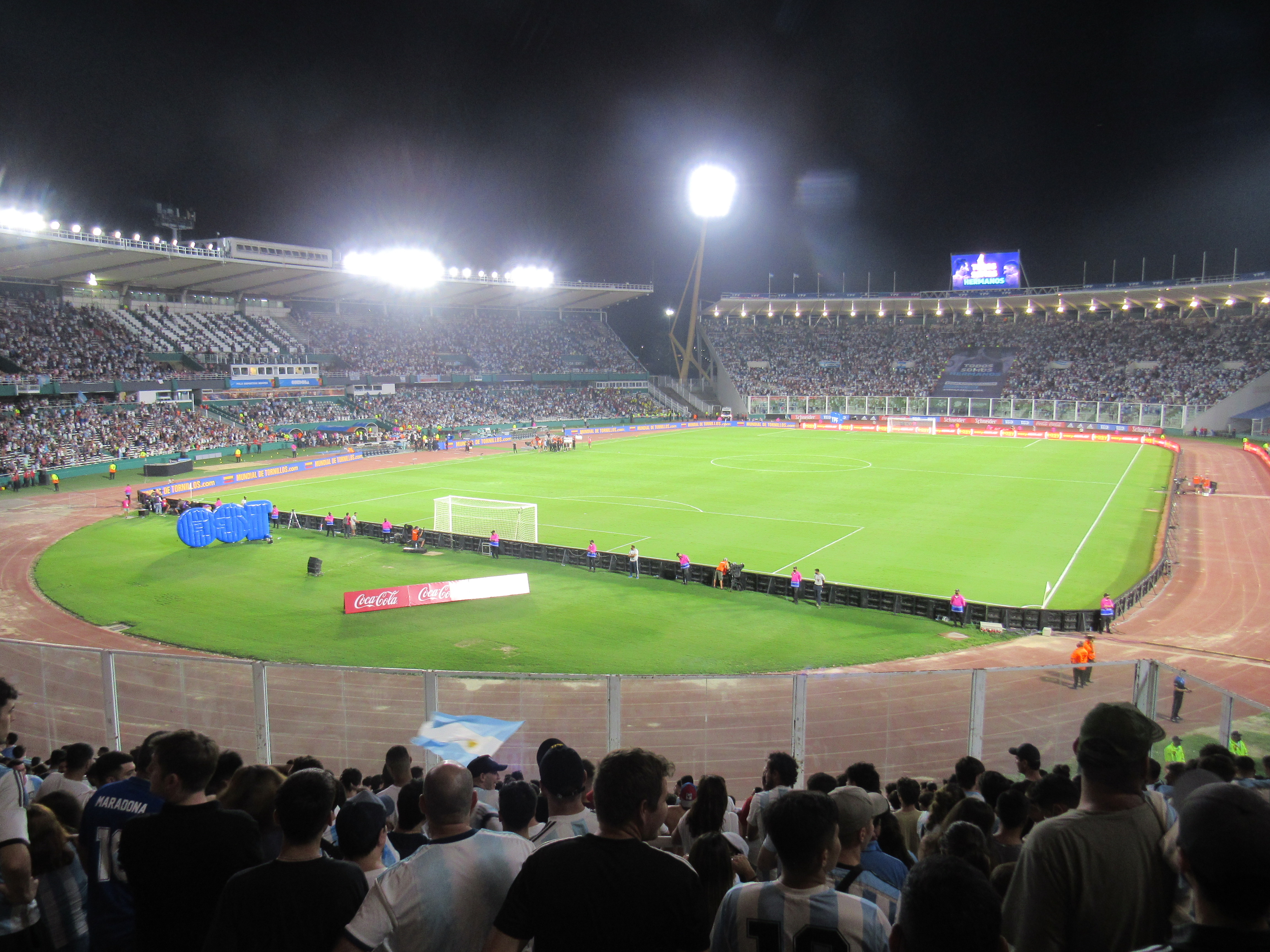
- Estadio Mario Alberto Kempes in Córdoba, venue
- Event: Trofeo de Campeones (LPF)
Boca Juniors	River Plate
- Date: TBD
- Venue: Estadio Mario Alberto Kempes, Córdoba

The 2020 Trofeo de Campeones de la Liga Profesional (officially the Trofeo de Campeones Binance 2020 for sponsorship reasons) is the postponed first edition of the Trofeo de Campeones de la Liga Profesional, an annual football match contested by the winners of Primera División and Copa de la Liga Profesional competitions, similar to the defunct Trofeo de Campeones de la Superliga Argentina.

As Boca Juniors won both championships, 2019–20 Primera División and 2020 Copa LPF, River Plate and Banfield (runners-up of the aforementioned competitions) played a semifinal, on 22 February 2023, to define the rival of Boca Juniors. River Plate defeated Banfield by a 3–2 score.

As of June 2026 the final match was neither scheduled nor officially cancelled.

== Qualified teams ==
#	Team	Qualification	Previous app.
1	Boca Juniors	2019–20 Primera División and 2020 Copa LPF champions	2022
2	River Plate	2019–20 Primera División runners-up	2021
2	Banfield	2020 Copa LPF runners-up	(None)

== Matches ==
=== Semifinal ===
==== Summary ====
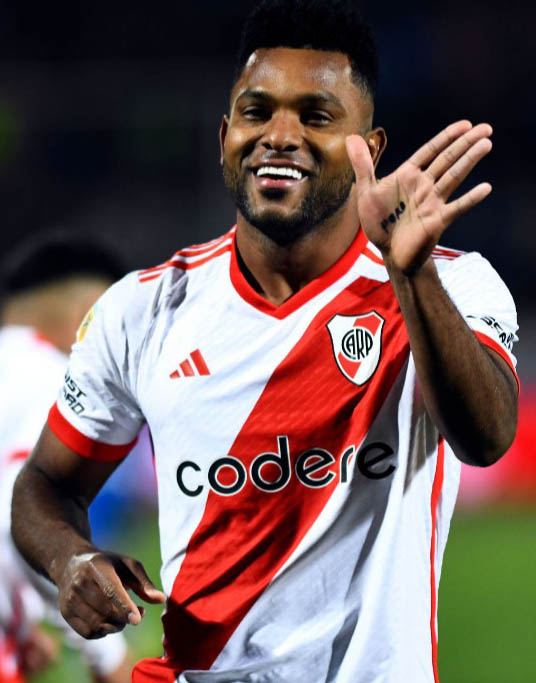
Miguel Borja scored the 3rd goal by River Plate

River Plate just hit the start with a weak shot from Santiago Simón from outside the penalty area that opened the score, making goalkeeper Facundo Cambeses' apparently late stretch in vain. But Banfield was not deterred by that bad start and went after the tie, which was close to achieve with repeated attacks that were successively failed by forward Andrés Chávez and Sebastián Sosa Sánchez, in addition to some successful interventions by River Plate goalkeeper Franco Armani and a free kick by Brahian Alemán that failed to score. But when Banfield were close to the tie, with 2 minutes remaining for the end of the first half, Santiago Simón scored the second goal for River Plate.

The second half saw Banfield once again in a determined attack attitude against a River that was always fragile in their deffensive line, especially in the cases of central backs Enzo Díaz and Jonatan Maidana.

A shot by Chávez hit the goalpost, but then he succeed to score the first goal for Banfield. Three minutes later Chávez scored again, but the goal was annulled by referee Facundo Tello after assistant referee Ezequiel Brailovsky raised his flag. According to the media, Chávez was not in offside position and the goal should have been validated.

Colombian striker Miguel Borja scored the 3rd goal for River Plate in the 64th minute, but Banfield continued pushing and in the 93rd minute the team managed by Javier Sanguinetti scored their 2nd goal for the definitive 3–2.

==== Details ====
22 February 2023
21:00 UTC−3
Semifinal

Banfield	2–3	River Plate
Chávez 52'; Bisanz 90+1'	Report	Simón 6', 43'; Borja 64'

Estadio Mario Alberto Kempes, Córdoba
Referee: Facundo Tello

Banfield
River Plate

GK	21	(Argentina) Facundo Cambeses
DF	32	(Argentina) Emanuel Coronel	(yellow card) 36'	(substituted off) 75'
DF	6	(Argentina) Alejandro Maciel	(yellow card) 13'
DF	22	(Argentina) Emanuel Olivera
DF	33	(Argentina) Emanuel Insúa
MF	17	(Argentina) Juan Bisanz
MF	16	(Argentina) Alejandro Cabrera	(yellow card) 38'
MF	10	(Uruguay) Brahian Alemán		(substituted off) 86'
MF	20	(Argentina) Ignacio Rodríguez		(substituted off) 65'
FW	7	(Uruguay) Sebastián Sosa Sánchez		(substituted off) 65'
FW	9	(Argentina) Andrés Chávez (c)		(substituted off) 87'
Substitutes:
GK	12	(Argentina) Facundo Sanguinetti
DF	3	(Argentina) Aarón Quirós
DF	25	(Argentina) Alan Di Pippa
DF	27	(Argentina) Pedro Souto
DF	37	(Argentina) Mateo Pérez
MF	4	(Argentina) Matías Romero		(substituted on) 75'
MF	5	(Argentina) Eric Remedi		(substituted on) 86'
MF	8	(Argentina) Nicolás Bertolo
MF	15	(Argentina) Lautaro Ríos
FW	11	(Argentina) Horacio Tijanovich		(substituted on) 65'
FW	23	(Uruguay) Nicolás Sosa		(substituted on) 87'
FW	45	(Argentina) Milton Giménez		(substituted on) 65'
Manager:
(Argentina) Javier Sanguinetti

GK	1	(Argentina) Franco Armani
DF	2	(Paraguay) Robert Rojas	(yellow card) 85'
DF	4	(Argentina) Jonatan Maidana
DF	13	(Argentina) Enzo Díaz
DF	20	(Argentina) Milton Casco	(yellow card) 38'
MF	24	(Argentina) Enzo Pérez (c)
MF	31	(Argentina) Santiago Simón		(substituted off) 78'
MF	10	(Argentina) Ignacio Fernández		(substituted off) 78'
MF	21	(Argentina) Esequiel Barco		(substituted off) 68'
FW	9	(Colombia) Miguel Borja		(substituted off) 82'
FW	25	(Venezuela) Salomón Rondón		(substituted off) 68'
Substitutes:
GK	12	(Argentina) Franco Petroli
GK	33	(Argentina) Ezequiel Centurión
DF	14	(Argentina) Leandro González Pírez
DF	15	(Argentina) Marcelo Herrera
DF	17	(Chile) Paulo Díaz
DF	30	(Argentina) Elías Gómez
MF	26	(Argentina) José Paradela	(yellow card) 88'	(substituted on) 78'
MF	29	(Argentina) Rodrigo Aliendro		(substituted on) 78'
MF	34	(Argentina) Tomás Castro Ponce
MF	36	(Argentina) Pablo Solari		(substituted on) 68'
FW	18	(Argentina) Lucas Beltrán		(substituted on) 82'
FW	35	(Argentina) Franco Alfonso		(substituted on) 68'
Manager:
(Argentina) Martín Demichelis

Assistant referees:
Ezequiel Brailovsky
Gabriel Chade
Fourth official:
Pablo Echavarría
Fifth official:
Iván Núñez
Video assistant referee:
Silvio Trucco
Assistant video assistant referee:
Gerardo Carretero

Match rules

- 90 minutes.
- Penalty shoot-out if scores still level.
- Twelve named substitutes.
- Maximum of five substitutions.

=== Final ===
TBD
TBD UTC−3

Boca Juniors	v	River Plate

Estadio Mario Kempes, Córdoba
Referee: TBD
