= 2021 Club Atlético Boca Juniors season =

Boca Juniors
2021 season
- President: Jorge Amor Ameal
- Manager: Miguel Ángel Russo (until 17 August); Sebastián Battaglia (from 17 August)
- Stadium: Estadio Alberto J. Armando
- Primera División: 4th
- 2019–20 Copa Argentina: Winners
- 2021 Copa Libertadores: Round of 16
| Home colours | Away colours | Third colours |

The 2021 Club Atlético Boca Juniors season was the 93rd consecutive Primera División season for the senior squad. It was an unusual season, due to the ongoing COVID-19 pandemic in the country. The Primera Division tournament returned after two national cups were played. Boca Juniors also took part in the Copa Argentina, and in the Final stages of the 2021 Copa Libertadores.

== Season overview ==
=== June ===
Marcelo Weigandt and Nazareno Solís returned from their respective loans. On June 3, Boca and Mauro Zárate agreed to mutually terminate the forward's contract, Zárate subsequently joined América Mineiro. On June 4, Boca and Carlos Tevez agreed to mutually terminate the forward's contract, Tevez subsequently joined; In a press conference, Tevez said that he was "physically fit to continue but not mentally" and that he can continue to play "at the age of 42, but not in Boca Juniors". Tevez won in the club 11 titles and played 279 matches. On June 11, Nicolás Orsini arrives from Lanús. On June 17, Norberto Briasco and Esteban Rolón arrived from Huracán. On June 23, Nicolás Capaldo was transferred to Red Bull Salzburg from Austria. Franco Soldano ended his loan with Boca and returned to his club.

=== July ===
Emmanuel Mas, Julio Buffarini and Leonardo Jara ended their contract with the club. On July 4, Esteban Andrada was transferred to Monterrey from Mexico. On July 13 Boca drew 0-0 against Brazilian Atlético Mineiro in Copa Libertadores. On the first match of Primera Division Boca drew 1-1 against Union. After another 0-0 draw against Atletico Mineiro Boca lost on penalties and was eliminated of Copa Libertadores. Gonzalo Maroni is loaned to Atlas. On July 24 Boca drew 0-0 against Banfield. On July 27 Boca lost 2-0 against San Lorenzo. On July 30 Juan Ramírez arrives from San Lorenzo. On July 31 Luis Advíncula arrives from Rayo Vallecano.

=== August ===
On August 1 Boca drew 0-0 against Talleres (C). On August 4 after a 0-0 draw Boca eliminated classic rival River Plate, winning 4-1 in penalties. On August 8 Boca drew 1-1 against Argentinos Juniors. Ramón Ábila interrupts the loan in Minnesota United, and is loaned to D.C. United. On August 15 Boca lost 1-0 against Estudiantes (LP). On August 17 Miguel Ángel Russo is sacked and Sebastián Battaglia is appointed as new manager. On August 21 Boca defeated Patronato 1-0. On August 25 Boca defeated Platense 3-1. On August 29 Boca drew 0-0 against Racing.

=== September ===
On September 4 Boca defeated Rosario Central 2-1. On September 14 Boca drew 0-0 against Defensa y Justicia. On September 18 Boca defeated Atlético Tucumán 2-1. On September 22 Boca advanced to the semifinals of Copa Argentina after eliminating Patronato on penalties. On September 26 Boca defeated Colón 1-0.

=== October ===
On October 3 Boca lost the Superclásico 2-0 against River Plate. On October 9 Boca defeated Lanús 4-2. On October 16 Boca defeated Huracán 3-0. On October 20 Boca defeated Godoy Cruz 2-1. On October 24 Boca lost 2-0 against Vélez Sarsfield. On October 30 Boca lost 1-0 against Gimnasia y Esgrima (LP).

=== November ===
On November 3 Boca defeated Argentinos Juniors 1-0 and advanced to Copa Argentina final. On November 8 Boca defeated Aldosivi 3-0. On November 19 Boca defeated Sarmiento (J) 2-0. On November 24 Boca lost 1-0 against Independiente. On November 30 Boca drew 0-0 against Newell's Old Boys.

=== December ===
On December 4 Boca drew 1-1 against Arsenal. On December 8, Boca won their 4th and record title of Copa Argentina after defeating Talleres (C) 5-4 on penalties after a 0-0 draw and qualified to the group stage of 2022 Copa Libertadores. In the last match of the league tournament on December 11, Boca defeated 8-1 Central Córdoba (SdE).

== Squad ==
Last updated on December 12, 2021.

| Squad no. | Name | Nationality | Position | Date of birth (age) | Apps | Goals | Last team | Note |
Goalkeepers
| 1 | Agustín Rossi | (Argentina) | GK | August 21, 1995 (age 31) | 105 | -75 | (Argentina) Lanús | |
| 13 | Javier García (VC 2º) | (Argentina) | GK | January 29, 1987 (age 39) | 49 | -59 | (Argentina) Racing | |
Defenders
| 2 | Lisandro López | (Argentina) | DF | September 1, 1989 (age 37) | 77 | 9 | (Portugal) Benfica | |
| 4 | Marcelo Weigandt | (Argentina) | DF | April 6, 2001 (age 25) | 25 | 1 | (Argentina) Gimnasia y Esgrima (LP) | |
| 5 | Carlos Zambrano | (Peru) | DF | July 10, 1989 (age 37) | 33 | 2 | (Ukraine) Dynamo Kyiv | |
| 6 | Marcos Rojo (VC 3º) | (Argentina) | DF | March 20, 1990 (age 36) | 30 | 1 | (England) Manchester United | |
| 17 | Luis Advíncula | (Peru) | DF | March 2, 1990 (age 36) | 17 | 0 | (Spain) Rayo Vallecano | |
| 18 | Frank Fabra | (Colombia) | DF | February 22, 1991 (age 35) | 140 | 11 | (Colombia) Independiente Medellín | |
| 19 | Valentín Barco | (Argentina) | DF | July 23, 2004 (age 22) | 3 | 0 | (Argentina) Youth team | |
| 24 | Carlos Izquierdoz (C) | (Argentina) | DF | November 3, 1988 (age 37) | 127 | 6 | (Mexico) Santos Laguna | |
| 35 | Renzo Giampaoli | (Argentina) | DF | January 7, 2000 (age 26) | 2 | 0 | (Argentina) Youth team | |
| 37 | Agustín Sández | (Argentina) | DF | January 16, 2001 (age 25) | 15 | 0 | (Argentina) Youth team | |
| 39 | Nicolás Valentini | (Argentina) | DF | April 6, 2001 (age 25) | 1 | 0 | (Argentina) Youth team | |
| 40 | Eros Mancuso | (Argentina) | DF | April 17, 1999 (age 27) | 6 | 1 | (Argentina) Youth team | |
Midfielders
| 8 | Edwin Cardona | (Colombia) | MF | December 8, 1992 (age 33) | 92 | 18 | (Mexico) Tijuana | |
| 11 | Eduardo Salvio | (Argentina) | MF | July 13, 1990 (age 36) | 51 | 15 | (Portugal) Benfica | |
| 14 | Esteban Rolón | (Argentina) | MF | March 25, 1995 (age 31) | 14 | 0 | (Argentina) Huracán | |
| 16 | Aaron Molinas | (Argentina) | MF | August 2, 2000 (age 26) | 20 | 0 | (Argentina) Youth team | |
| 20 | Juan Ramírez | (Argentina) | MF | May 25, 1993 (age 33) | 19 | 1 | (Argentina) San Lorenzo | |
| 21 | Jorman Campuzano | (Colombia) | MF | April 30, 1996 (age 30) | 81 | 2 | (Colombia) Atlético Nacional | |
| 23 | Diego González | (Argentina) | MF | February 9, 1988 (age 38) | 30 | 3 | (Argentina) Racing Club | |
| 26 | Ezequiel Fernández | (Argentina) | MF | July 25, 2002 (age 24) | 3 | 0 | (Argentina) Youth team | |
| 32 | Agustín Almendra | (Argentina) | MF | February 11, 2000 (age 26) | 67 | 6 | (Argentina) Youth team | |
| 33 | Alan Varela | (Argentina) | MF | July 4, 2001 (age 25) | 35 | 0 | (Argentina) Youth team | |
| 36 | Cristian Medina | (Argentina) | MF | June 1, 2002 (age 24) | 39 | 1 | (Argentina) Youth team | |
| 41 | Rodrigo Montes | (Argentina) | MF | April 3, 2000 (age 26) | 11 | 1 | (Argentina) Youth team | |
| 42 | Gabriel Vega | (Argentina) | MF | April 18, 2002 (age 24) | 3 | 0 | (Argentina) Youth team | |
Forwards
| 9 | Nicolás Orsini | (Argentina) | FW | September 12, 1994 (age 32) | 9 | 1 | (Argentina) Lanús | |
| 22 | Sebastián Villa | (Colombia) | FW | May 19, 1996 (age 30) | 106 | 17 | (Colombia) Deportes Tolima | |
| 29 | Norberto Briasco | (Armenia) | FW | February 29, 1996 (age 30) | 20 | 1 | (Argentina) Huracán | |
| 30 | Exequiel Zeballos | (Argentina) | FW | April 24, 2002 (age 24) | 17 | 1 | (Argentina) Youth team | |
| 31 | Cristian Pavón | (Argentina) | FW | January 21, 1996 (age 30) | 164 | 36 | (United States) LA Galaxy | |
| 34 | Agustín Obando | (Argentina) | FW | March 11, 2000 (age 26) | 44 | 2 | (Argentina) Youth team | |
| 38 | Luis Vázquez | (Argentina) | FW | January 14, 2001 (age 25) | 31 | 7 | (Argentina) Youth team | |
| 50 | Vicente Taborda | (Argentina) | FW | June 16, 2001 (age 25) | 3 | 0 | (Argentina) Youth team | |

== Transfers ==
=== Winter ===
==== In ====
Players transferred
| Pos. | Name | Club | Fee |
|---|---|---|---|
| DF | (Peru) Luis Advíncula | (Spain) Rayo Vallecano | Undisclosed |
| MF | (Argentina) Juan Ramírez | (Argentina) San Lorenzo | Undisclosed |
| MF | (Argentina) Esteban Rolón | (Argentina) Huracán | Undisclosed |
| FW | (Armenia) Norberto Briasco | (Argentina) Huracán | Undisclosed |
| FW | (Argentina) Nicolás Orsini | (Argentina) Lanús | Undisclosed |

Players loaned
| Pos. | Name | Club | End date |

Loan Return
| Pos. | Name | Return from |
|---|---|---|
| DF | (Argentina) Marcelo Weigandt | (Argentina) Gimnasia y Esgrima (LP) |
| FW | (Argentina) Nazareno Solís | (Greece) OFI Crete |

==== Out ====
Players transferred
| Pos. | Name | Club | Fee |
|---|---|---|---|
| GK | (Argentina) Esteban Andrada | (Mexico) Monterrey | Undisclosed |
| DF | (Argentina) Julio Buffarini | (Spain) Huesca | Free |
| DF | (Argentina) Leonardo Jara | (Argentina) Vélez Sarsfield | Free |
| DF | (Argentina) Emmanuel Mas | (United States) Orlando City | Free |
| MF | (Argentina) Nicolás Capaldo | (Austria) Red Bull Salzburg | $6M |
| FW | (Argentina) Carlos Tevez | | Free |
| FW | (Argentina) Mauro Zárate | (Brazil) América Mineiro | Free |

Players loaned
| Pos. | Name | Club | End date |
|---|---|---|---|
| MF | (Argentina) Gonzalo Maroni | (Mexico) Atlas | |

Loan return
| Pos. | Name | Return to |
|---|---|---|
| FW | (Argentina) Franco Soldano | (Greece) Olympiacos |

== Competitions ==
=== Overall ===
| Competition | First match | Last match | Starting round | Final position | Record | | | | | | | |
| Competition | First match | Last match | Starting round | Final position | Pld | W | D | L | GF | GA | GD | Win % |
|---|---|---|---|---|---|---|---|---|---|---|---|---|
| Primera División | 18 July 2021 | 12 December 2021 | Matchday 1 | 4th | 25 | 11 | 8 | 6 | 35 | 19 | +16 | 44.00 |
| 2019–20 Copa Argentina | 4 August 2021 | 8 December 2021 | Round of 16^{1} | Winners | 4 | 1 | 3 | 0 | 1 | 0 | +1 | 25.00 |
| 2021 Copa Libertadores | 13 July 2021 | 20 July 2021 | Round of 16^{1} | Round of 16 | 2 | 0 | 2 | 0 | 0 | 0 | +0 | 0.00 |
| Total | | | | | 31 | 12 | 13 | 6 | 36 | 19 | +17 | 38.71 |

Last updated: December 12, 2021.
Source: Competitions

1: The Round of 64 and Round of 32 were played in the previous season. 2: The group stage of 2021 Copa Libertadores was played in the previous season.

=== Primera División ===
==== League table ====
| Pos | Team | Pld | W | D | L | GF | GA | GD | Pts |
|---|---|---|---|---|---|---|---|---|---|
| 2 | Defensa y Justicia | 25 | 13 | 8 | 4 | 43 | 24 | +19 | 47 |
| 3 | Talleres (C) | 25 | 14 | 4 | 7 | 38 | 28 | +10 | 46 |
| 4 | Boca Juniors | 25 | 11 | 8 | 6 | 35 | 19 | +16 | 41 |
| 5 | Vélez Sarsfield | 25 | 10 | 9 | 6 | 34 | 21 | +13 | 39 |
| 6 | Estudiantes (LP) | 25 | 10 | 9 | 6 | 43 | 31 | +12 | 39 |

Source: AFA
Rules for classification: 1) points; 2) play-off (only if needed to decide championship); 3) goal difference; 4) goals scored; 5) head-to-head points; 6) head-to-head goal difference; 7) head-to-head goals scored.

==== International Qualification ====
| Pos | Team | Pld | W | D | L | GF | GA | GD | Pts | Qualification |
|---|---|---|---|---|---|---|---|---|---|---|
| 3 | Talleres (C) (Q) | 37 | 19 | 9 | 9 | 56 | 42 | +14 | 66 | Qualification for Copa Libertadores group stage (Note: River Plate, Colón and Boca Juniors qualified for the Copa Libertadores group stage by winning the 2021 Argentine Primera División, the 2021 Copa de la Liga Profesional and the 2019–20 Copa Argentina, respectively.) |
| 4 | Colón (Q) | 38 | 18 | 10 | 10 | 49 | 41 | +8 | 64 | Qualification for Copa Libertadores group stage |
| 5 | Boca Juniors (Q) | 38 | 17 | 12 | 9 | 57 | 31 | +26 | 63 | Qualification for Copa Libertadores group stage |
| 6 | Estudiantes (LP) (Q) | 38 | 16 | 13 | 9 | 59 | 41 | +18 | 61 | Qualification for Copa Libertadores second stage |
| 7 | Defensa y Justicia (Q) | 37 | 15 | 11 | 11 | 56 | 44 | +12 | 56 | Qualification for Copa Sudamericana group stage |

Updated to match(es) played on 11 December 2021. Source: AFA
Rules for classification: 1) points; 2) goal difference; 3) goals scored; 4) head-to-head points; 5) head-to-head goal difference; 6) head-to-head goals scored.
(Q) Qualified for the phase indicated

==== Relegation table ====
| Pos | Team | 2019–20 Pts | 2021 Pts | Total Pts | Total Pld | Avg |
|---|---|---|---|---|---|---|
| 1 | River Plate | 47 | 75 | 122 | 62 | 1.968 |
| 2 | Boca Juniors | 51 | 63 | 114 | 62 | 1.839 |
| 3 | Vélez Sarsfield | 39 | 70 | 109 | 62 | 1.758 |

==== Results summary ====
| Overall | | | | | | | | Home | | | | | | Away | | | | | |
| Pld | W | D | L | GF | GA | GD | Pts | W | D | L | GF | GA | GD | W | D | L | GF | GA | GD |
|---|---|---|---|---|---|---|---|---|---|---|---|---|---|---|---|---|---|---|---|
| 25 | 11 | 8 | 6 | 35 | 19 | +16 | 41 | 6 | 4 | 2 | 19 | 8 | +11 | 5 | 4 | 4 | 16 | 11 | +5 |

Source: AFA

==== Results by round ====
| Round | 1 | 2 | 3 | 4 | 5 | 6 | 7 | 8 | 9 | 10 | 11 | 12 | 13 | 14 | 15 | 16 | 17 | 18 | 19 | 20 | 21 | 22 | 23 | 24 | 25 |
|---|---|---|---|---|---|---|---|---|---|---|---|---|---|---|---|---|---|---|---|---|---|---|---|---|---|
| Ground | A | A | H | A | H | A | H | A | H | A | H | A | H | A | H | A | H | A | H | A | H | A | H | A | H |
| Result | D | D | L | D | D | L | W | W | D | W | D | W | W | L | W | W | W | L | L | W | W | L | D | D | W |
| Position | 12 | 17 | 23 | 23 | 23 | 24 | 20 | 14 | 14 | 9 | 9 | 8 | 6 | 9 | 6 | 3 | 3 | 5 | 6 | 6 | 4 | 5 | 6 | 7 | 4 |

Source: AFA
A = Away; H = Home; W = Win; D = Draw; L = Loss

==== Matches ====
Win Draw Loss Postponed

| July 16, 2021 1 | Unión | 1–1 | Boca Juniors | Santa Fe |
| 19:00 UTC−3 | Cordero (yellow card) 19'; García (yellow card) 36'; Brítez (yellow card) 41'; Portillo (yellow card) 42'; Márquez 80' | Report | Obando 9'; Orsini (yellow card) 41'; Campuzano (yellow card) 74'; Weigandt (yellow card) 82' | Stadium: 15 de Abril; Referee: Nicolás Lamolina |

| July 24, 2021 2 | Banfield | 0–0 | Boca Juniors | Banfield |
| 20:15 UTC−3 | Coronel (yellow card) 52' | Report | Aranda (yellow card) 24'; Escalante (yellow card) 65'; Barco (yellow card) 79' | Stadium: Florencio Solá; Referee: Pablo Echavarría |

| July 27, 2021 3 | Boca Juniors | 0–2 | San Lorenzo | Buenos Aires |
| 21:00 UTC−3 | Fernández (yellow card) 77' | Report | Fernández (yellow card) 8'; Peruzzi 30' (yellow card) 90+2'; Gordillo (yellow card) 32'; Rojas (yellow card) 37'; Ortigoza 46' (pen.) | Stadium: La Bombonera; Referee: Fernando Echenique |

| August 1, 2021 4 | Talleres (C) | 0–0 | Boca Juniors | Córdoba |
| 15:45 UTC−3 | Tenaglia (yellow card) 18'; Pérez (yellow card) 45' | Report | Rolón (yellow card) 25'; Sández (yellow card) 77'; Rojo (yellow card) 85' | Stadium: Mario Alberto Kempes; Referee: Fernando Echenique |

| August 8, 2021 5 | Boca Juniors | 1–1 | Argentinos Juniors | Buenos Aires |
| 18:00 UTC−3 | Cardona (yellow card) 30' (yellow-red card) 76'; Izquierdoz (yellow card) 54'; Torrén 68' (o.g.); Campuzano (yellow card) 75' | Report | Romero 18' (yellow card) 59'; Villalba (yellow card) 36'; Hauche (yellow card) 44'; Florentín (yellow card) 90+1' | Stadium: La Bombonera; Referee: Nicolás Lamolina |

| August 15, 2021 6 | Estudiantes (LP) | 1–0 | Boca Juniors | La Plata |
| 18:00 UTC−3 | Sánchez Miño (yellow card) 41'; Noguera (yellow card) 62' (goal) 75'; Del Prete (yellow card) 41' | Report | Rojo (yellow card) 64' | Stadium: Jorge Luis Hirschi; Referee: Facundo Tello |

| August 21, 2021 7 | Boca Juniors | 1–0 | Patronato | Buenos Aires |
| 20:15 UTC−3 | Vázquez 84' | Report | Gudiño (yellow card) 89' | Stadium: La Bombonera |

| August 25, 2021 8 | Platense | 1–3 | Boca Juniors | Florida |
| 21:00 UTC−3 | Bertolo 44'; Curuchet (yellow card) 46'; Lamberti (yellow card) 90' | Report | Briasco 23'; González 52'; Sández (yellow card) 66'; Pavón 90+3' | Stadium: Ciudad de Vicente López; Referee: Leandro Rey Hilfer |

| August 29, 2021 9 | Boca Juniors | 0–0 | Racing Club | Buenos Aires |
| 20:15 UTC−3 | Varela (yellow card) 89' | Report | Martínez (yellow card) 76' | Stadium: La Bombonera; Referee: Fernando Rapallini |

| September 4, 2021 10 | Rosario Central | 1–2 | Boca Juniors | Rosario |
| 20:15 UTC−3 | Martínez (yellow card) 5'; Ávila 10' | Report | Sández (yellow card) 10'; Campuzano (yellow card) 13'; Vázquez 35'; Rojo (yellow card) 67'; Torrent 89' (o.g.) | Stadium: Gigante de Arroyito; Referee: Fernando Espinoza |

| September 14, 2021 11 | Boca Juniors | 0–0 | Defensa y Justicia | Buenos Aires |
| 21:00 UTC−3 | Sández (yellow card) 7' | Report | Tripichio (yellow card) 80' | Stadium: La Bombonera; Referee: Ariel Penel |

| September 18, 2021 12 | Atlético Tucumán | 1–2 | Boca Juniors | San Miguel de Tucumán |
| 20:15 UTC−3 | Lotti (yellow card) 27'; López 56' (o.g.); Campos (yellow card) 57'; Benítez (yellow card) 88'; Menéndez (yellow card) 90+3'; Mussis (red card) 90+5' | Report | López 10'; Montes 29'; Campuzano (yellow card) 80' | Stadium: Monumental José Fierro; Referee: Hernán Mastrángelo |

| September 26, 2021 13 | Boca Juniors | 1–0 | Colón | Buenos Aires |
| 20:15 UTC−3 | Pavón (yellow card) 26'; Orsini 65'; Almendra (yellow card) 81' | Report | Ferreira (yellow card) 30'; Aliendro (yellow card) 87'; Leguizamón (yellow card) 88'; Goez (yellow card) 90+3' | Stadium: La Bombonera; Referee: Nicolás Lamolina |

| October 3, 2021 14 | River Plate | 2–1 | Boca Juniors | Buenos Aires |
| 17:00 UTC−3 | Pérez (yellow card) 4'; Álvarez 24', 42' (yellow card) 26' | Report | Rojo (yellow card) 14' (yellow-red card) 15'; Zambrano 90+2' | Stadium: Monumental Antonio Vespucio Liberti; Referee: Fernando Rapallini |

| October 9, 2021 15 | Boca Juniors | 4–2 | Lanús | Buenos Aires |
| 20:15 UTC−3 | Weigandt 31'; Almendra 37'; Vázquez 49' (yellow card) 88'; Campuzano (yellow card) 66'; Pavón 90+3' (pen.) | Report | Malcorra 22' (yellow card) 36'; Belmonte (yellow card) 24'; Braghieri 81' | Stadium: La Bombonera; Referee: Pablo Echavarría |

| October 16, 2021 16 | Huracán | 0–3 | Boca Juniors | Buenos Aires |
| 20:15 UTC−3 | Ibáñez (yellow card) 4'; Díaz (yellow card) 46' | Report | Weigandt (yellow card) 14'; Almendra 32'; Rolón (yellow card) 56'; Vázquez 61'; Rojo 74' (pen.) | Stadium: Tomás Adolfo Ducó; Referee: Nicolás Lamolina |

| October 20, 2021 17 | Boca Juniors | 2–1 | Godoy Cruz | Buenos Aires |
| 21:15 UTC−3 | Fabra 37'; Vázquez 45'; Almendra (yellow card) 54' | Report | Badaloni 9'; Ortiz (yellow card) 45+1'; González (yellow card) 90+4' | Stadium: La Bombonera; Referee: Patricio Loustau |

| October 24, 2021 18 | Vélez Sarsfield | 2–0 | Boca Juniors | Buenos Aires |
| 20:15 UTC−3 | Mancuello 38'; Bouzat (yellow card) 58' de los Santos (yellow card) 76'; Tarragona 89' | Report | Rojo (yellow card) 68' | Stadium: José Amalfitani Stadium; Referee: Diego Abal |

| October 30, 2021 19 | Boca Juniors | 0–1 | Gimnasia y Esgrima (LP) | Buenos Aires |
| 20:15 UTC−3 | Almendra (yellow card) 63'; Pavón (yellow card) 90+1' | Report | Rodríguez 16' (pen.); Alemán (yellow card) 45+7' (yellow-red card) 66'; Cecchini (yellow card) 63'; Morales (yellow card) 70'; Torres (yellow card) 78' | Stadium: La Bombonera; Referee: Ariel Penel |

| November 8, 2021 20 | Aldosivi | 0–3 | Boca Juniors | Mar del Plata |
| 21:15 UTC−3 | E. Insúa (yellow card) 79' | Report | Almendra 15'; Fabra (yellow card) 55'; Cardona 70'; Villa 90' | Stadium: José María Minella; Referee: Andrés Merlos |

| November 20, 2021 21 | Boca Juniors | 2–0 | Sarmiento (J) | Buenos Aires |
| 19:15 UTC−3 | Vázquez 24'; Fabra 46' | Report | | Stadium: La Bombonera; Referee: Leandro Rey Hilfer |

| November 24, 2021 22 | Independiente | 1–0 | Boca Juniors | Buenos Aires |
| 21:30 UTC−3 | Benavídez 19' (yellow card) 45'; Roa (yellow card) 51'; Insaurralde (yellow card) 62'; Velasco (yellow card) 81' | Report | Medina (yellow card) 23'; Almendra (yellow card) 45'; Sández (yellow card) 72'; Izquierdoz (red card) 81'; Varela (yellow card) 90+1' | Stadium: Libertadores de América; Referee: Pablo Echavarría |

| November 28, 2021 23 | Boca Juniors | 0–0 | Newell's Old Boys | Buenos Aires |
| 21:30 UTC−3 | Almendra (yellow card) 72' | Report | Pérez (yellow card) 44'; González (yellow card) 44'; Cacciabue (yellow card) 81' | Stadium: La Bombonera; Referee: Patricio Loustau |

| December 4, 2021 24 | Arsenal | 1–1 | Boca Juniors | Sarandí |
| 17:00 UTC−3 | Picco (yellow card) 9'; Miloc (yellow card) 66'; Albertengo (yellow card) 67'; Sepúlveda 74'; Navas (yellow card) 90+2' | Report | Ramírez 43' | Stadium: Julio H. Grondona; Referee: Néstor Pitana |

| December 11, 2021 25 | Boca Juniors | 8–1 | Central Córdoba (SdE) | Buenos Aires |
| 22:00 UTC−3 | Pavón 14', 63'; Salvio 21'; Zeballos 27' (pen.); González 43'; Mancuso 43'; Vázquez 80'; Villa 90' | Report | Vega (red card) 18'; Giménez 76' | Stadium: La Bombonera; Referee: Mauro Vigliano |

=== Copa Argentina ===
==== Round of 16 ====
| August 4, 2021 | Boca Juniors | 0–0 (4–1 p) | River Plate | La Plata |
| 19:00 UTC−3 | González (yellow card) 33'; Rojo (yellow card) 52'; Zambrano (yellow card) 56'; Ramírez (yellow card) 80' | Report | Pérez (yellow card) 21'; Martínez (yellow card) 23'; Montiel (yellow card) 42'; Díaz (yellow card) 45+1'; Zuculini (yellow card) 57'; Romero (yellow card) 64' | Stadium: Ciudad de La Plata; Referee: Patricio Loustau |
| | Penalties |
| | Rojo (penalty scored); Ramírez (penalty scored); Pavón (penalty scored); Izquierdoz (penalty scored) | | (penalty missed) Álvarez; (penalty missed) Romero; (penalty scored) Martínez |

==== Quarterfinals ====
| September 22, 2021 | Boca Juniors | 0–0 (4–2 p) | Patronato | Santiago del Estero |
| 21:30 UTC−3 | Ramírez (yellow card) 34'; Campuzano (yellow card) 68' | Report | Gudiño (yellow card) 24'; Vázquez (yellow card) 31'; Leys (yellow card) 31'; Geminiani (yellow card) 44'; Ramírez (yellow card) 34' | Stadium: Único Madre de Ciudades; Referee: Pablo Echavarría |
| | Penalties |
| | Rojo (penalty scored); Izquierdoz (penalty scored); Molinas (penalty scored); Pavón (penalty scored) | | (penalty missed) Sosa Sánchez; (penalty missed) Marín; (penalty scored) Palavecino; (penalty scored) Ibáñez |

==== Semifinals ====
| November 3, 2021 | Boca Juniors | 1–0 | Argentinos Juniors | Mendoza |
| 21:10 UTC−3 | Izquierdoz (yellow card) 26'; Vázquez 56' | Report | Reniero (yellow card) 36'; Torrén (yellow card) 70' | Stadium: Malvinas Argentinas; Referee: Fernando Echenique |

==== Final ====
| December 8, 2021 | Talleres (C) | 0–0 (4–5 p) | Boca Juniors | Santiago del Estero |
| 21:10 UTC−3 | Fabra (yellow card) 35'; Ramírez (yellow card) 62' (yellow-red card) 66'; Cardona (yellow card) 67' | Report | Villagra (yellow card) 3'; Valoyes (yellow card) 31'; Auzqui (yellow card) 45'; Tenaglia (yellow card) 52' | Stadium: Estadio Madre de Ciudades; Referee: Darío Herrera |
| | Penalties |
| | Retegui (penalty scored); Fértoli (penalty missed); Méndez (penalty scored); Díaz (penalty scored); Santos (penalty scored) | | (penalty scored) Rojo; (penalty scored) Izquierdoz; (penalty scored) Pavón; (penalty scored) Sández; (penalty scored) Salvio |

=== 2021 Copa Libertadores ===
==== Final Stages ====
| 13 July 2021 First leg | Boca Juniors (Argentina) | 0–0 | (Brazil) Atlético Mineiro | Buenos Aires, Argentina |
| 19:15 UTC−3 | Rojo (yellow card) 39'; Pavón (yellow card) 45+5'; Izquierdoz (yellow card) 90+7' | Report | Zaracho (yellow card) 39'; Allan (yellow card) 66'; Vargas (yellow card) 89'; Hulk (yellow card) 90+6' | Stadium: La Bombonera; Referee: Andrés Rojas (Colombia) |

| 20 July 2021 Second leg | Atlético Mineiro (Brazil) | 0–0 (0–0 agg.) (3–1 p) | (Argentina) Boca Juniors | Belo Horizonte, Brazil |
| 19:15 UTC−3 | Fernández (yellow card) 59'; Nathan (yellow card) 74'; Hulk (yellow card) 90+3' | Report | Weigandt (yellow card) 59'; Sández (yellow card) 78'; Rojo (yellow card) 86' | Stadium: Estádio Mineirão; Referee: Esteban Ostojich (Uruguay) |
| | Penalties |
| | Hulk (penalty missed); Fernández (penalty scored); Alonso (penalty scored); Hyoran (penalty missed); Everson (penalty scored) | | (penalty scored) Rojo; (penalty missed) Villa; (penalty missed) Rolón; (penalty missed) Izquierdoz |

== Team statistics ==
| | Total | Home | Away | Neutral |
|---|---|---|---|---|
| Games played | 31 | 13 | 14 | 4 |
| Games won | 12 | 7 | 4 | 1 |
| Games drawn | 13 | 5 | 5 | 3 |
| Games lost | 6 | 2 | 4 | |
| Biggest win | 8–1 vs Central Córdoba (SdE) | 8–1 vs Central Córdoba (SdE) | 3–0 vs Huracán | 1–0 vs Argentinos |
| Biggest loss | 0-2 vs San Lorenzo | 0-2 vs San Lorenzo | 0-2 vs Vélez | None |
| Biggest win (Primera División) | 8–1 vs Central Córdoba (SdE) | 8–1 vs Central Córdoba (SdE) | 3–0 vs Huracán | None |
| Biggest win (Copa Argentina) | 1–0 vs Argentinos | None | | 1–0 vs Argentinos |
| Biggest win (Copa Libertadores) | None | | | |
| Biggest loss (Primera División) | 0-2 vs San Lorenzo | 0-2 vs San Lorenzo | 0-2 vs Vélez | None |
| Biggest loss (Copa Argentina) | None | | | |
| Biggest loss (Copa Libertadores) | None | | | |
| Clean sheets | 16 | 8 | 4 | 4 |
| Goals scored | 35 | 18 | 16 | 1 |
| Goals conceded | 19 | 9 | 11 | 0 |
| Goal difference | +17 | +11 | +5 | +1 |
| Yellow cards | 57 | 18 | 28 | 11 |
| Red cards | 2 | 1 | 1 | |
| Top scorer | Vázquez (8) | Vázquez (5) | Vázquez; Almendra (2) | Vázquez (1) |
| Penalties for | 2 | 1 | 1 | |
| Penalties against | 1 | 1 | | |

=== Season Appearances and goals ===
As of December 12, 2021

| No. | Pos | Nat | Player | Total | | Primera División | | Copa Argentina | | Copa Libertadores | |
| No. | Pos | Nat | Player | Apps | Goals | Apps | Goals | Apps | Goals | Apps | Goals |
Goalkeepers
| 1 | GK | (Argentina) ARG | Agustín Rossi | 27 | -15 | 21 | -15 | 4 | 0 | 2 | 0 |
| 13 | GK | (Argentina) ARG | Javier García | 2 | -2 | 2 | -2 | 0 | 0 | 0 | 0 |
Defenders
| 2 | DF | (Argentina) ARG | Lisandro López | 10 | 1 | 8+1 | 1 | 0+1 | 0 | 0 | 0 |
| 4 | DF | (Argentina) ARG | Marcelo Weigandt | 13 | 1 | 8+2 | 1 | 0+1 | 0 | 2 | 0 |
| 5 | DF | (Peru) PER | Carlos Zambrano | 7 | 1 | 4+1 | 1 | 2 | 0 | 0 | 0 |
| 6 | DF | (Argentina) ARG | Marcos Rojo | 21 | 1 | 15+1 | 1 | 3 | 0 | 2 | 0 |
| 17 | DF | (Peru) PER | Luis Advíncula | 17 | 0 | 12+1 | 0 | 4 | 0 | 0 | 0 |
| 18 | DF | (Colombia) COL | Frank Fabra | 22 | 2 | 16+2 | 2 | 4 | 0 | 0 | 0 |
| 19 | DF | (Argentina) ARG | Valentín Barco | 3 | 0 | 2+1 | 0 | 0 | 0 | 0 | 0 |
| 24 | DF | (Argentina) ARG | Carlos Izquierdoz | 26 | 0 | 20 | 0 | 4 | 0 | 2 | 0 |
| 35 | DF | (Argentina) ARG | Renzo Giampaoli | 1 | 0 | 1 | 0 | 0 | 0 | 0 | 0 |
| 37 | DF | (Argentina) ARG | Agustín Sández | 12 | 0 | 7+1 | 0 | 1+1 | 0 | 2 | 0 |
| 39 | DF | (Argentina) ARG | Nicolás Valentini | 0 | 0 | 0 | 0 | 0 | 0 | 0 | 0 |
| 40 | DF | (Argentina) ARG | Eros Mancuso | 6 | 1 | 4+2 | 1 | 0 | 0 | 0 | 0 |
Midfielder
| 8 | MF | (Colombia) COL | Edwin Cardona | 16 | 1 | 9+3 | 1 | 2+2 | 0 | 0 | 0 |
| 11 | MF | (Argentina) ARG | Eduardo Salvio | 7 | 1 | 3+3 | 1 | 0+1 | 0 | 0 | 0 |
| 14 | MF | (Argentina) ARG | Esteban Rolón | 14 | 0 | 7+4 | 0 | 1 | 0 | 2 | 0 |
| 16 | MF | (Argentina) ARG | Aaron Molinas | 20 | 0 | 10+8 | 0 | 0+1 | 0 | 0+1 | 0 |
| 20 | MF | (Argentina) ARG | Juan Ramírez | 19 | 1 | 13+3 | 1 | 3 | 0 | 0 | 0 |
| 21 | MF | (Colombia) COL | Jorman Campuzano | 19 | 0 | 13+1 | 0 | 3+1 | 0 | 0+1 | 0 |
| 23 | MF | (Argentina) ARG | Diego González | 19 | 2 | 5+8 | 2 | 1+3 | 0 | 2 | 0 |
| 26 | MF | (Argentina) ARG | Ezequiel Fernández | 2 | 0 | 2 | 0 | 0 | 0 | 0 | 0 |
| 32 | MF | (Argentina) ARG | Agustín Almendra | 18 | 3 | 13+2 | 3 | 3 | 0 | 0 | 0 |
| 33 | MF | (Argentina) ARG | Alan Varela | 11 | 0 | 4+5 | 0 | 0+1 | 0 | 0+1 | 0 |
| 36 | MF | (Argentina) ARG | Cristian Medina | 19 | 0 | 6+9 | 0 | 1+1 | 0 | 2 | 0 |
| 41 | MF | (Argentina) ARG | Rodrigo Montes | 11 | 1 | 9+1 | 1 | 0+1 | 0 | 0 | 0 |
| 42 | MF | (Argentina) ARG | Gabriel Vega | 3 | 0 | 2+1 | 0 | 0 | 0 | 0 | 0 |
Forwards
| 9 | FW | (Argentina) ARG | Nicolás Orsini | 9 | 1 | 4+2 | 1 | 1 | 0 | 0+2 | 0 |
| 22 | FW | (Colombia) COL | Sebastián Villa | 10 | 2 | 3+3 | 2 | 2 | 0 | 2 | 0 |
| 29 | FW | (Armenia) ARM | Norberto Briasco | 19 | 1 | 8+6 | 1 | 2+1 | 0 | 2 | 0 |
| 30 | FW | (Argentina) ARG | Exequiel Zeballos | 8 | 1 | 2+6 | 1 | 0 | 0 | 0 | 0 |
| 31 | FW | (Argentina) ARG | Cristian Pavón | 26 | 4 | 13+7 | 4 | 2+2 | 0 | 2 | 0 |
| 34 | FW | (Argentina) ARG | Agustín Obando | 4 | 1 | 1+2 | 1 | 0+1 | 0 | 0 | 0 |
| 38 | FW | (Argentina) ARG | Luis Vázquez | 25 | 8 | 15+7 | 7 | 2+1 | 1 | 0 | 0 |
| 50 | FW | (Argentina) ARG | Vicente Taborda | 3 | 0 | 2+1 | 0 | 0 | 0 | 0 | 0 |
Players who have made an appearance or had a squad number this season, but have left the club
| 20 | MF | (Argentina) ARG | Gonzalo Maroni | 0 | 0 | 0 | 0 | 0 | 0 | 0 | 0 |

=== Top scorers ===
As of December 12, 2021

| Rank | Pos. | No. | Name | Primera División | Copa Argentina | Copa Libertadores | Total |
|---|---|---|---|---|---|---|---|
| 1 | FW | 38 | (Argentina) Luis Vázquez | 7 | 1 | | 8 |
| 2 | FW | 31 | (Argentina) Cristian Pavón | 4 | | | 4 |
| 3 | MF | 32 | (Argentina) Agustín Almendra | 3 | | | 3 |
| 4 | FW | 22 | (Colombia) Sebastián Villa | 2 | | | 2 |
| 5 | DF | 18 | (Colombia) Frank Fabra | 2 | | | 2 |
| 6 | MF | 34 | (Argentina) Diego González | 2 | | | 2 |
| 7 | FW | 29 | (Armenia) Norberto Briasco | 1 | | | 1 |
| 8 | FW | 34 | (Argentina) Agustín Obando | 1 | | | 1 |
| 9 | DF | 2 | (Argentina) Lisandro López | 1 | | | 1 |
| 10 | MF | 41 | (Argentina) Rodrigo Montes | 1 | | | 1 |
| 11 | FW | 9 | (Argentina) Nicolás Orsini | 1 | | | 1 |
| 12 | DF | 5 | (Peru) Carlos Zambrano | 1 | | | 1 |
| 13 | DF | 4 | (Argentina) Marcelo Weigandt | 1 | | | 1 |
| 14 | DF | 6 | (Argentina) Marcos Rojo | 1 | | | 1 |
| 15 | MF | 8 | (Colombia) Edwin Cardona | 1 | | | 1 |
| 16 | MF | 20 | (Argentina) Juan Ramírez | 1 | | | 1 |
| 17 | DF | 40 | (Argentina) Eros Mancuso | 1 | | | 1 |
| 18 | FW | 11 | (Argentina) Eduardo Salvio | 1 | | | 1 |
| 19 | MF | 30 | (Argentina) Exequiel Zeballos | 1 | | | 1 |
| Own goals | | | | 2 | | | 2 |
| Total | | | | 35 | 1 | | 36 |

=== Top assists ===
As of December 12, 2021

| Rank | Pos. | No. | Name | Primera División | Copa Argentina | Copa Libertadores | Total |
|---|---|---|---|---|---|---|---|
| 1 | FW | 31 | (Argentina) Cristian Pavón | 4 | | | 4 |
| 2 | MF | 8 | (Colombia) Edwin Cardona | 3 | | | 3 |
| 3 | MF | 20 | (Argentina) Juan Ramírez | 2 | | | 2 |
| 4 | MF | 21 | (Colombia) Jorman Campuzano | 2 | | | 2 |
| 5 | MF | 16 | (Argentina) Aaron Molinas | 2 | | | 2 |
| 6 | FW | 22 | (Colombia) Sebastián Villa | 2 | | | 2 |
| 7 | FW | 30 | (Argentina) Exequiel Zeballos | 1 | | | 1 |
| 8 | DF | 24 | (Argentina) Carlos Izquierdoz | 1 | | | 1 |
| 9 | DF | 37 | (Argentina) Agustín Sández | 1 | | | 1 |
| 10 | MF | 32 | (Argentina) Agustín Almendra | 1 | | | 1 |
| 11 | FW | 38 | (Argentina) Luis Vázquez | 1 | | | 1 |
| 12 | MF | 11 | (Argentina) Eduardo Salvio | 1 | | | 1 |
| 13 | MF | 23 | (Argentina) Diego González | 1 | | | 1 |
| 14 | DF | 40 | (Argentina) Eros Mancuso | 1 | | | 1 |
| Total | | | | 23 | | | 23 |

=== Penalties ===
| Date | Penalty Taker | Scored | Opponent | Competition |
|---|---|---|---|---|
| 9 October 2021 | Cristian Pavón | Yes | Lanús | Primera División |
| 17 October 2021 | Marcos Rojo | Yes | Huracán | Primera División |
| 11 December 2021 | Exequiel Zeballos | Yes | Central Córdoba (SdE) | Primera División |

=== Clean sheets ===
As of December 12, 2021

| Rank | Pos. | No. | Name | Primera División | Copa Argentina | Copa Libertadores | Total |
|---|---|---|---|---|---|---|---|
| 1 | GK | 1 | (Argentina) Agustín Rossi | 10 | 4 | 2 | 16 |
| 2 | GK | 43 | (Argentina) Agustín Lastra | 1 | 0 | 0 | 1 |
| Total | | | | 11 | 4 | 2 | 16 |

=== Disciplinary record ===
As of December 12, 2021

| No. | Pos | Nat | Name | Primera División | | | Copa Argentina | | | Copa Libertadores | | | Total | | |
| No. | Pos | Nat | Name | Booked | (yellow card) (yellow-red card) | Sent off (straight red) | Booked | (yellow card) (yellow-red card) | Sent off (straight red) | Booked | (yellow card) (yellow-red card) | Sent off (straight red) | Booked | (yellow card) (yellow-red card) | Sent off (straight red) |
Goalkeepers
| 1 | GK | (Argentina) | Agustín Rossi | | | | | | | | | | | | |
| 13 | GK | (Argentina) | Javier García | | | | | | | | | | | | |
Defenders
| 2 | DF | (Argentina) | Lisandro López | | | | | | | | | | | | |
| 4 | DF | (Argentina) | Marcelo Weigandt | 2 | | | | | | 1 | | | 3 | | |
| 5 | DF | (Peru) | Carlos Zambrano | | | | 1 | | | | | | 1 | | |
| 6 | DF | (Argentina) | Marcos Rojo | 4 | 1 | | 1 | | | 2 | | | 7 | 1 | |
| 17 | DF | (Peru) | Luis Advíncula | | | | | | | | | | | | |
| 18 | DF | (Colombia) | Frank Fabra | 1 | | | 1 | | | | | | 2 | | |
| 19 | DF | (Argentina) | Valentín Barco | 1 | | | | | | | | | 1 | | |
| 24 | DF | (Argentina) | Carlos Izquierdoz | 1 | | 1 | 1 | | | 1 | | | 3 | | 1 |
| 35 | DF | (Argentina) | Renzo Giampaoli | | | | | | | | | | | | |
| 37 | DF | (Argentina) | Agustín Sández | 5 | | | | | | 1 | | | 6 | | |
| 39 | DF | (Argentina) | Nicolás Valentini | | | | | | | | | | | | |
| 40 | DF | (Argentina) | Eros Mancuso | | | | | | | | | | | | |
Midfielders
| 8 | MF | (Colombia) | Edwin Cardona | | 1 | | 1 | | | | | | 1 | 1 | |
| 11 | MF | (Argentina) | Eduardo Salvio | | | | | | | | | | | | |
| 14 | MF | (Argentina) | Esteban Rolón | 2 | | | | | | | | | 2 | | |
| 16 | MF | (Argentina) | Aaron Molinas | | | | | | | | | | | | |
| 20 | MF | (Argentina) | Juan Ramírez | | | | 2 | 1 | | | | | 2 | 1 | |
| 21 | MF | (Colombia) | Jorman Campuzano | 5 | | | 1 | | | | | | 6 | | |
| 23 | MF | (Argentina) | Diego González | | | | 1 | | | | | | 1 | | |
| 26 | MF | (Argentina) | Ezequiel Fernández | 1 | | | | | | | | | 1 | | |
| 32 | MF | (Argentina) | Agustín Almendra | 5 | | | | | | | | | 5 | | |
| 33 | MF | (Argentina) | Alan Varela | 2 | | | | | | | | | 2 | | |
| 36 | MF | (Argentina) | Cristian Medina | 1 | | | | | | | | | 1 | | |
| 41 | MF | (Argentina) | Rodrigo Montes | | | | | | | | | | | | |
| 42 | MF | (Argentina) | Gabriel Vega | | | | | | | | | | | | |
Forwards
| 9 | FW | (Argentina) | Nicolás Orsini | 1 | | | | | | | | | 1 | | |
| 22 | FW | (Colombia) | Sebastián Villa | | | | | | | | | | | | |
| 29 | FW | (Armenia) | Norberto Briasco | | | | | | | | | | | | |
| 30 | FW | (Argentina) | Exequiel Zeballos | | | | | | | | | | | | |
| 31 | FW | (Argentina) | Cristian Pavón | 2 | | | | | | 1 | | | 4 | | |
| 34 | FW | (Argentina) | Agustín Obando | | | | | | | | | | | | |
| 38 | FW | (Argentina) | Luis Vázquez | 1 | | | | | | | | | | 1 | |
| 50 | FW | (Argentina) | Vicente Taborda | | | | | | | | | | | | |
Players who have made an appearance or had a squad number this season, but have left the club
| 20 | MF | (Argentina) | Gonzalo Maroni | | | | | | | | | | | | |
| Total | | | | 34 | 2 | 1 | 9 | 1 | | 6 | | | 49 | 3 | 1 |
