= Nicolás Valentini =

Argentine footballer

Personal information
- Date of birth: 6 April 2001 (age 25)
- Place of birth: Junín, Buenos Aires, Argentina
- Height: 1.87 m (6 ft 2 in)
- Position: Centre-back

Team information
- Current team: Alavés

Youth career
- River de Junín
- –2015: Sarmiento
- 2015–2021: Boca Juniors

Senior career*
Years	Team	Apps	(Gls)
2021–2024	Boca Juniors	15	(1)
2022	→ Aldosivi (loan)	25	(1)
2025–2026	Fiorentina	0	(0)
2025–	→ Hellas Verona (loan)	35	(0)
2026–	Alavés	0	(0)

International career
2023–2024	Argentina Olympic	8	(0)
- * Club domestic league appearances and goals as of 25 May 2026

Nicolás Valentini (born 6 April 2001) is an Argentine professional footballer who plays as a centre-back for La Liga club Alavés.

== Club career ==
Born in Junín, Buenos Aires, Valentini began his career at River de Junín, and played for Sarmiento before joining Boca Juniors' youth sides in 2015. He made his first team debut on 8 May 2021, in a 1–0 Copa de la Liga Profesional loss to Patronato, before being loaned out to Aldosivi in the following year.

On 1 January 2025, Valentini signed for Italian club Fiorentina on a contract until 2029. On 3 February 2025, he was loaned to Hellas Verona.

On 7 August 2026, Valentini joined La Liga side Alavés on a three-year deal.

== International career ==
Valentini was a member of the Argentina national under-23 football team that played at the 2024 CONMEBOL Pre-Olympic Tournament and qualified for the 2024 Summer Olympics men's football tournament in France. On 5 March 2024, Valentini was called up to the Argentina national team replacing Marcos Senesi who was withdrawn from the squad due to an injury in the right hamstring.

== Personal life ==
Born and raised in Argentina, Valentini is of Italian descent.

== Career statistics ==
=== Club ===
As of match played 25 May 2025

Appearances and goals by club, season and competition
Club	Season	League			National cup		Continental		Other		Total	
Club	Season	Division	Apps	Goals	Apps	Goals	Apps	Goals	Apps	Goals	Apps	Goals
Boca Juniors	2021	Argentine Primera División	0	0	0	0	0	0	1 (Note: Appearances in Copa de la Liga Profesional)	0	1	0
Boca Juniors	2023	Argentine Primera División	15	1	1	0	11 (Note: Appearances in Copa Libertadores)	0	10	0	37	1
Boca Juniors	2024	Argentine Primera División	0	0	0	0	2 (Note: Appearances in Copa Sudamericana)	0	7	1	9	1
Boca Juniors	Total		15	1	1	0	13	0	18	1	47	2
Aldosivi (loan)	2022	Argentine Primera División	25	1	0	0	—		14	0	39	1
Fiorentina	2024–25	Serie A	0	0	—		—		—		0	0
Hellas Verona (loan)	2024–25	Serie A	14	0	—		—		—		14	0
Career total			54	2	1	0	13	0	32	1	100	3

== Honours ==
Boca Juniors

- Supercopa Argentina: 2022
- Supercopa Internacional runner-up: 2022
- Copa Libertadores runner-up: 2023
