= Valentín Barco =

Argentine footballer (born 2004)

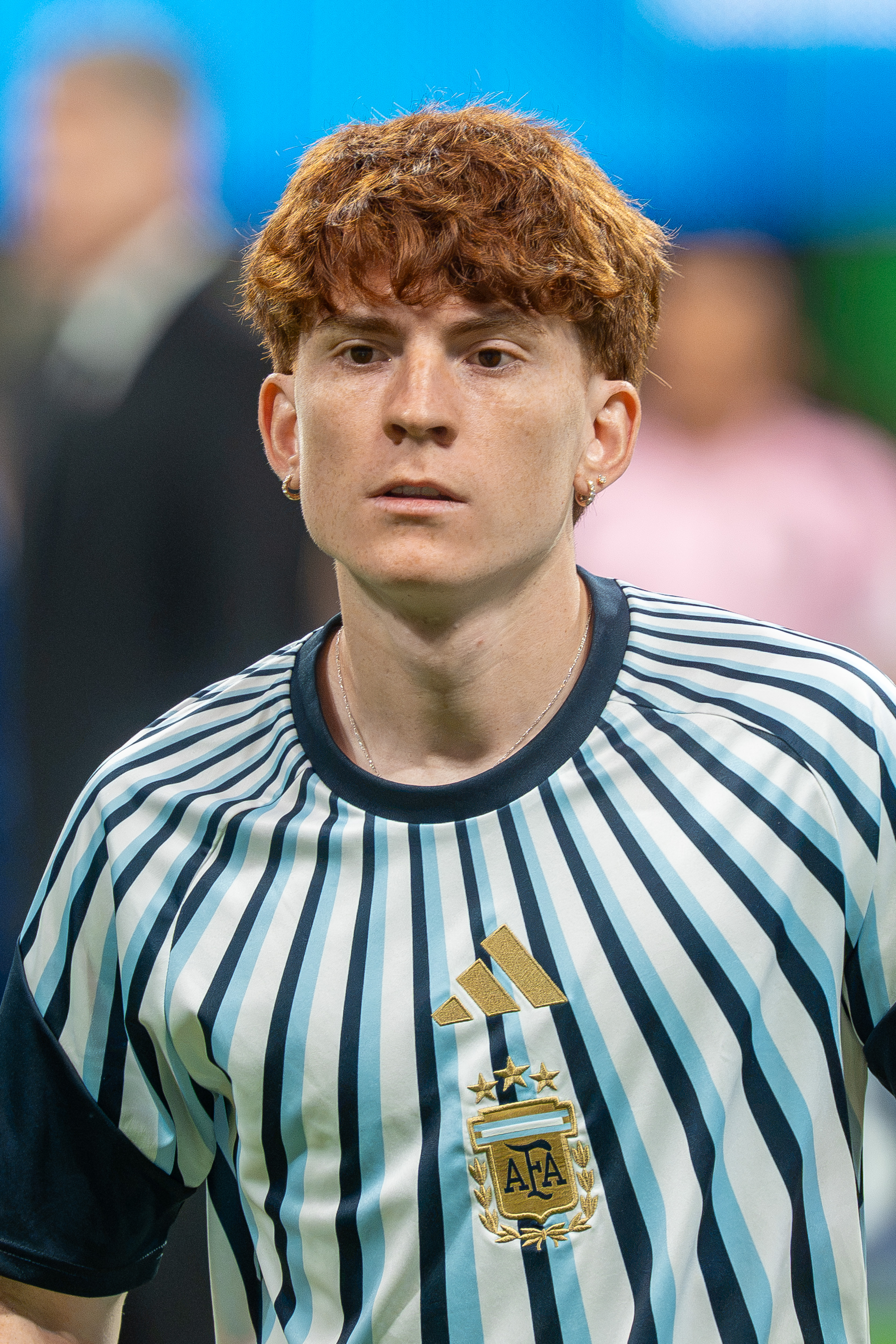
- Barco with Argentina in 2026

Personal information
- Full name: Valentín Barco
- Date of birth: 23 July 2004 (age 22)
- Place of birth: Veinticinco de Mayo, Buenos Aires, Argentina
- Height: 1.70 m (5 ft 7 in)
- Positions: Midfielder; left-back

Team information
- Current team: Chelsea
- Number: 4

Youth career
- 2007–2013: Sportivo Las Parejas
- 2013–2014: Norberto de la Riestra
- 2014–2021: Boca Juniors

Senior career*
Years	Team	Apps	(Gls)
2021–2024	Boca Juniors	23	(1)
2024–2025	Brighton & Hove Albion	6	(0)
2024–2025	→ Sevilla (loan)	7	(0)
2025	→ Strasbourg (loan)	14	(0)
2025–2026	Strasbourg	27	(2)
2026–	Chelsea	4	(0)

International career^{‡}
2019	Argentina U15	6	(3)
2022–2023	Argentina U20	11	(1)
2023–	Argentina U23	2	(1)
2024–	Argentina	7	(2)
Medal record
Men's football
Representing Argentina
FIFA World Cup
Runner-up	2026 Canada–Mexico–US
- * Club domestic league appearances and goals as of 14:43, 31 October 2026 (UTC) ‡ National team caps and goals as of 05:42, 4 October 2026 (UTC)

Valentín "Colo" Barco (born 23 July 2004) is an Argentine professional footballer who plays as a midfielder for Premier League club Chelsea and the Argentina national team.

== Club career ==
=== Boca Juniors ===
In 2021, Barco signed his professional contract. On 16 July 2021, he made his professional debut at 16 years old in a 1–1 draw against Unión. He was included in The Guardian's "Next Generation" list for 2021.

On 29 June 2023, Barco scored his first goal for the club in a 4–0 victory against Monagas in the Copa Libertadores. Less than one month later on 24 July, he scored his first league goal in a 2–1 victory against Newell's Old Boys after converting a cross from Pol Fernández. He continued to fulfil his promise for Boca, when on 10 August 2023, during their game against Nacional Montevideo in the Copa Libertadores round of 16, produced a dominant display for the blue and gold, displaying creativity key to both Boca goals. Boca were pegged back twice during the 90 minutes of regulation play and with the game at 2–2 on the night and on aggregate, it went to penalties. Barco stepped up fifth of five for Boca and scored the decisive penalty to take them to the semi-finals.

In the semi-finals, Boca faced Brazilian club Palmeiras. The first leg finished goalless at La Bombonera in Buenos Aires. During the return leg in Brazil, Barco stood on the ball with both feet whilst in possession, a move that at his young age in a Copa Libertadores semi-final, stunned the Palmeiras players, fans and South American critics alike. It was a move that garnered many headlines, despite a counter-attacking goal by Edinson Cavani and a red card being shown to Marcos Rojo. The draw, once again for Boca – with a 1–1 aggregate score – went to a penalty shootout. They won the shootout 4–2, courtesy of a heroic display by goalkeeper Sergio Romero.

At the age of 19, Barco played as a starter for Boca in the 2023 Copa Libertadores final against Fluminense. He played 78 minutes before being replaced by fellow youth product Luca Langoni. Boca lost the final 2–1 after extra time, courtesy of goals by German Cano and John Kennedy.

=== Brighton & Hove Albion ===
On 20 January 2024, Barco transferred to Premier League club Brighton & Hove Albion for an undisclosed fee – reported to be around $10 million (€9.1 million) – signing a four-and-a-half year contract until 30 June 2028.

==== Loan to Sevilla ====
On 23 August 2024, Barco moved to La Liga club Sevilla on loan for the 2024–25 season without buy option.

=== Strasbourg ===
On 2 February 2025, Barco moved on another loan, this time to Ligue 1 club Strasbourg. On 2 July 2025, he moved to Strasbourg permanently for a fee of £7.87 million.

=== Chelsea ===
On 2 August 2026, Chelsea announced the signing of Barco on a seven-year contract until 2033 for a reported deal of £34 million. Barco scored his first goal for Chelsea in a 6–3 win against Leeds United in the third round of the EFL Cup on 9 September 2026.

== International career ==
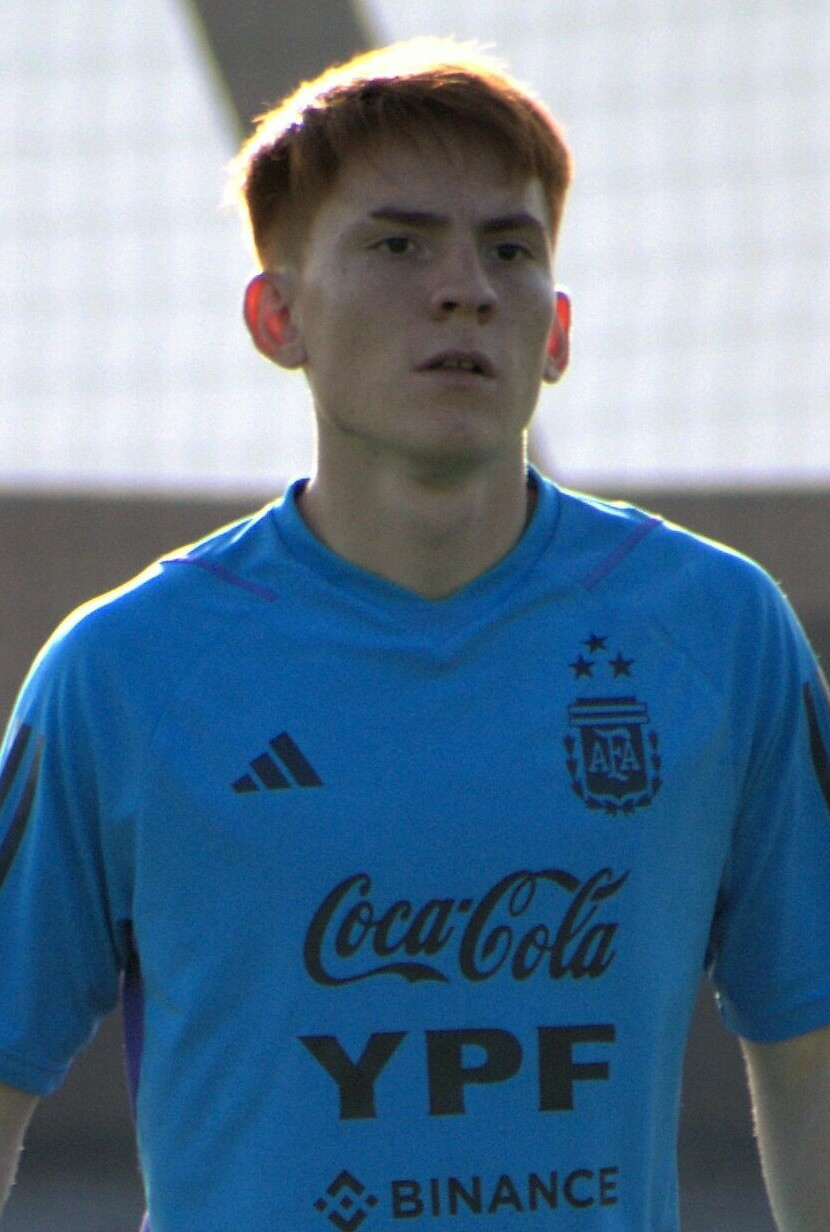
Barco with Argentina U20 in 2023

Barco debuted for the Argentine senior squad on 23 March 2024 in a friendly match against El Salvador. He scored his first international goal in the stoppage time of a 5–0 victory over Zambia on 1 April 2026.

Barco was selected in the 26-man squad for the 2026 FIFA World Cup. During the tournament, he played against Jordan in a group stage match which Argentina won 3–1. In the Semi-final against England, which resulted in 2–1 win for Argentina, he was an unused substitute. During the match, Barco celebrated the winning goal by running from the substitutes bench, away from his teammates and towards the England players. After the match ended, he was slapped on the back of his head by England's Jude Bellingham, after supposedly insulting him behind his back.

== Style of play ==
Barco has been described as one of Argentina's most intriguing youth prospects. He has played as a marauding full-back who can make forward runs and create chances for his teammates. He has also been noted for his versatility, having played as a winger, and more recently as a central midfielder.

== Career statistics ==
=== Club ===
As of match played 31 October 2026

Appearances and goals by club, season and competition
Club	Season	League			National cup (Note: Includes Copa Argentina, FA Cup, Copa del Rey, Coupe de France)		League cup (Note: Includes EFL Cup)		Continental		Total	
Club	Season	Division	Apps	Goals	Apps	Goals	Apps	Goals	Apps	Goals	Apps	Goals
Boca Juniors	2021	Argentine Primera División	3	0	0	0	—		0	0	3	0
Boca Juniors	2022	Argentine Primera División	0	0	0	0	0	0	0	0	0	0
Boca Juniors	2023	Argentine Primera División	20	1	3	0	0	0	9 (Note: Appearances in Copa Libertadores)	1	32	2
Boca Juniors	Total		23	1	3	0	0	0	9	1	35	2
Brighton & Hove Albion	2023–24	Premier League	6	0	1	0	—		0	0	7	0
Sevilla (loan)	2024–25	La Liga	7	0	2	0	—		—		9	0
Strasbourg (loan)	2024–25	Ligue 1	14	0	1	0	—		—		15	0
Strasbourg	2025–26	Ligue 1	27	2	4	0	—		12 (Note: Appearances in UEFA Conference League)	1	43	3
Strasbourg	Strasbourg total		41	2	5	0	—		12	1	58	3
Chelsea	2026–27	Premier League	4	0	0	0	3	1	—		7	1
Career total			81	3	11	0	3	1	21	2	116	6

=== International ===
As of match played 3 October 2026

Appearances and goals by national team and year
National team	Year	Apps	Goals
Argentina	2024	1	0
Argentina	2025	0	0
Argentina	2026	6	2
Total		7	2

Argentina score listed first, score column indicates score after each Barco goal.

List of international goals scored by Valentín Barco
No.	Date	Venue	Cap	Opponent	Score	Result	Competition
1	31 March 2026	La Bombonera, Buenos Aires, Argentina	2	Zambia	5–0	5–0	Friendly
2	9 June 2026	Jordan–Hare Stadium, Auburn, United States	4	Iceland	1–0	3–0	Friendly

== Honours ==
Boca Juniors

- Copa Libertadores runner-up: 2023

Argentina

- FIFA World Cup runner-up: 2026
