= Rodrigo Montes =

Argentine footballer

Personal information
- Full name: Rodrigo Agustín Montes
- Date of birth: 3 April 2000 (age 26)
- Place of birth: Córdoba, Argentina
- Position: Midfielder

Team information
- Current team: Central Córdoba SdE (on loan from Boca Juniors)
- Number: 19

Youth career
- Boca Juniors

Senior career*
Years	Team	Apps	(Gls)
2021–	Boca Juniors	10	(1)
2022–	→ Central Córdoba SdE (loan)	5	(1)
- * Club domestic league appearances and goals as of 20:54, 24 March 2022 (UTC)

Rodrigo Agustín Montes (born 3 April 2000) is an Argentine footballer currently playing as a midfielder for Central Córdoba SdE on loan from Boca Juniors.

== Career statistics ==
=== Club ===
As of 18 September 2021.

Club	Season	League			Cup		Continental		Other		Total	
Club	Season	Division	Apps	Goals	Apps	Goals	Apps	Goals	Apps	Goals	Apps	Goals
Boca Juniors	2021	Argentine Primera División	3	1	0	0	0	0	0	0	3	1
Career total			3	1	0	0	0	0	0	0	3	1
