= Agustín Dattola =

Argentine professional footballer

Personal information
- Full name: Agustín Nicolás Dattola
- Date of birth: 20 April 1999 (age 27)
- Place of birth: Argentina
- Height: 1.90 m (6 ft 3 in)
- Position: Centre-back

Team information
- Current team: Almirante Brown

Youth career
- Almirante Brown

Senior career*
Years	Team	Apps	(Gls)
2019–	Almirante Brown	136	(2)
2023	→ Barracas Central (loan)	5	(0)
2024	→ San Martín Tucumán (loan)	39	(2)
2025	→ Belgrano (loan)	4	(0)
- * Club domestic league appearances and goals as of 17:20, 22 April 2026 (UTC)

Agustín Nicolás Dattola (born 20 April 1999) is an Argentine professional footballer who plays as a centre-back for Almirante Brown.

== Career ==
Dattola began with Almirante Brown. He made the breakthrough into senior football under manager Blas Giunta midway through 2018–19, appearing for his debut in Primera B Metropolitana on 16 February 2019 against Fénix. Dattola again played the full duration of the club's next nine fixtures, a streak that was ended after he received a red card versus Atlanta on 14 April.

== Career statistics ==
As of 19 April 2019.

Appearances and goals by club, season and competition
Club	Season	League			Cup		League Cup		Continental		Other		Total	
Club	Season	Division	Apps	Goals	Apps	Goals	Apps	Goals	Apps	Goals	Apps	Goals	Apps	Goals
Almirante Brown	2018–19	Primera B Metropolitana	10	0	0	0	—		—		0	0	10	0
Career total			10	0	0	0	—		—		0	0	10	0
