= Juan Bisanz =

Argentine footballer

Personal information
- Full name: Juan Francisco Bisanz
- Date of birth: 28 August 2001 (age 25)
- Place of birth: Buenos Aires, Argentina
- Height: 1.80 m (5 ft 11 in)
- Position: Winger

Team information
- Current team: Huracán
- Number: 17

Youth career
- Atlanta

Senior career*
Years	Team	Apps	(Gls)
2021–2023	Atlanta	45	(5)
2023–2025	Banfield	64	(7)
2025–	Huracán	30	(2)

International career
2023	Argentina U23	1	(0)
- * Club domestic league appearances and goals as of 17:37, 6 July 2026 (UTC)

Juan Francisco Bisanz (born 28 August 2001) is an Argentine professional footballer who plays as a winger for Huracán.

== Club career ==
Bisanz came through the youth system at Club Atlético Atlanta and made his first team debut in the Primera Nacional on 5 July 2021 in a 2–1 loss to Estudiantes BA. The following month he signed his first professional contract, along with his brother Federico. On 19 September he scored his first goal in a 1–1 draw against Temperley.

On 2 February 2023, he signed for Argentine Primera División side Banfield for $600,000. He made his debut 5 days later in a 3–2 defeat against Huracán. On 5 February 2024, he suffered a rupture of the right anterior cruciate ligament during a friendly against Sarmiento.

In June 2025, he signed for Huracán, joining in an agreement to settle a debt with Banfield over the loan of Leandro Garate. He made his debut on 12 July. On 14 February 2026, he scored his first goal for the club in a 1–0 win against Sarmiento.

== International career ==
In 2023, he played for the Argentina Olympic Football Team.

== Career statistics ==
As of 13 January 2026

Appearances and goals by club, season and competition
Club	Season	League			Cup (Note: Includes Copa Argentina)		Continental		Other		Total	
Club	Season	Division	Goals	Apps	Apps	Goals	Apps	Goals	Apps	Goals	Apps	Goals
Atlanta	2021	Primera Nacional	14	1	—		—		—		14	1
Atlanta	2022	Primera Nacional	31	4	—		—		—		31	4
Atlanta	Total		45	5	0	0	0	0	0	0	45	5
Banfield	2023	AFA Liga Profesional de Fútbol	41	7	2	0	—		—		43	7
Banfield	2024	AFA Liga Profesional de Fútbol	13	0	1	0	—		—		14	0
Banfield	2025	AFA Liga Profesional de Fútbol	10	0	0	0	—		—		10	0
Banfield	Total		64	7	3	0	0	0	0	0	67	7
Huracán	2025	AFA Liga Profesional de Fútbol	16	0	0	0	2 (Note: Appearances in Copa Sudamericana)	0	—		18	0
Career total			125	12	3	0	2	0	0	0	130	12
