= Yonatan Rodríguez =

Uruguayan footballer (born 1993)

Personal information
- Full name: Yonatan Alexis Rodríguez Benítez
- Date of birth: 1 July 1993 (age 33)
- Place of birth: Montevideo, Uruguay
- Height: 1.75 m (5 ft 9 in)
- Position: Midfielder

Team information
- Current team: Deportes Concepción
- Number: 18

Youth career
- Flores Palma (five-a-side)
- Cerrito

Senior career*
Years	Team	Apps	(Gls)
2013–2024	Cerrito	146	(9)
2022–2023	→ Nacional (loan)	48	(7)
2024	Gimnasia LP	12	(0)
2024	Banfield	11	(0)
2025	Nacional	9	(0)
2025	→ Racing Montevideo (loan)	9	(0)
2026–	Deportes Concepción	1	(0)
- * Club domestic league appearances and goals as of 1 March 2026

Yonatan Alexis Rodríguez Benítez (born 1 July 1993) is a Uruguayan professional footballer who plays as a defensive midfielder for Chilean club Deportes Concepción.

== Career ==
Rodríguez is from a humble background in Montevideo, one of five children. Whilst playing at Palma De Flores Baby Futbol Club he would sometimes have to go to training without having first had breakfast. Rodríguez came through the ranks at Club Sportivo Cerrito playing as a defensive midfielder.

He made his debut against Boston River on 12 October 2013 in a 0–0 draw in the Uruguayan Segunda División. He stayed with the club despite relegation to Uruguayan third division in 2014–15. In the third division they played for one season and over the following seasons reached the promotion playoffs on more than one occasion before achieving promotion from the Segunda Division as champions in 2020. Rodríguez made a total of 146 appearances league and scored 9 goals for the senior Cerrito side prior to joining Nacional aged 28 in January 2022 on a one-year loan deal. The deal contained a stipulation for a second season should he play a minimum of 60% of their matches.

With Nacional he made his debut in the Copa Libertadores, starting all six of their games, as well as making three appearances in the Copa Sudamerica. He was part of their title-winning 2022 Uruguayan Primera División season. From the first 50 games available to him in all competitions he secured 33 starts plus 3 substitute appearances to ensure an automatic second season with Nacional as stated in his contract.

In January 2025, he returned to Nacional after spending 2 years in the Argentine Primera División with Gimnasia LP and Banfield.

On 19 February 2026, Rodriguez signed with Chilean club Deportes Concepción.

== Honours ==
Cerrito

- Uruguayan Segunda División:2020

Nacional

- Uruguayan Primera División: 2022
