= Ezequiel Centurión =

Argentine footballer

Personal information
- Full name: Ezequiel Ignacio Centurión
- Date of birth: 18 May 1997 (age 29)
- Place of birth: Cipolletti, Argentina
- Height: 1.84 m (6 ft 0 in)
- Position: Goalkeeper

Team information
- Current team: River Plate
- Number: 33

Youth career
- Pillmatún
- Cipolletti
- 2013–2014: Fernández Oro
- 2014–2018: River Plate

Senior career*
Years	Team	Apps	(Gls)
2018–	River Plate	5	(0)
2021	→ Estudiantes Caseros (loan)	32	(0)
2024–2025	→ Independiente Rivadavia (loan)	52	(0)

International career^{‡}
2019	Argentina U23	1	(0)
- * Club domestic league appearances and goals as of 18:58, 10 February 2026 (UTC) ‡ National team caps and goals as of 06:09, 3 August 2023 (UTC)

Ezequiel Ignacio Centurión (born 18 May 1997) is an Argentine professional footballer who plays as a goalkeeper for Argentine Primera División club River Plate.

== Career ==
Centurión is a youth product of Pillmatún, Cipolletti, and Fernández Oro before moving to River Plate's academy in 2014. He began as their fourth goalkeeper and first appeared as reserve goalkeeper for the senior side in 2018. He went on loan with Estudiantes Caseros for the 2021 season. He made his professional debut with Estudiantes Caseros in a 2–1 Primera Nacional loss to Almirante Brown on 13 March 2021. He returned to River Plate after his loan spell, again acting as backup goalkeeper.

== International career ==
Centurión was called up to represent the Argentina U23s for a set of friendlies in September 2019.

== Honours ==
River Plate

- Argentine Primera División: 2023
- Trofeo de Campeones: 2023
- Supercopa Argentina: 2023

Independiente Rivadavia

- Copa Argentina: 2025
