= 2021–22 Copa Argentina =

2022 Copa Argentina
Tournament details
- Country: Argentina
- Dates: 23 February – 30 October 2022
- Teams: 64

Final positions
- Champions: Patronato (1st title)
- Runners-up: Talleres (C)
- 2023 Copa Libertadores: Patronato

Tournament statistics
- Matches played: 62
- Goals scored: 154 (2.48 per match)
- Top goal scorer(s): Jesús Dátolo; Marcelo Estigarribia (4 goals each)

Awards
- Best player: Facundo Altamirano

The 2022 Copa Argentina (officially the Copa Argentina AXION energy 2022 for sponsorship reasons) was the twelfth edition of the Copa Argentina, and the tenth since the relaunch of the tournament in 2011. The competition began on 23 February and ended on 30 October 2022. Boca Juniors, the defending champions, were eliminated in the semi-finals.

Patronato defeated Talleres (C) 1–0 in the final to win their first title in the tournament. As winners, they qualified for the 2023 Copa Libertadores group stage and earned the right to play against the winners of the 2022 Argentine Primera División in the 2022 Supercopa Argentina.

== Teams ==
Sixty-four teams took part in this competition: All twenty-six teams from the Primera División; fifteen teams of the Primera Nacional; six from the Primera B, four from the Primera C; three from the Primera D and ten teams from Federal A.

=== First Level ===
==== Primera División ====
All twenty-six teams of the 2021 tournament qualified.

- Aldosivi
- Argentinos Juniors
- Arsenal
- Atlético Tucumán
- Banfield
- Boca Juniors^{TH}
- Central Córdoba (SdE)
- Colón
- Defensa y Justicia
- Estudiantes (LP)
- Gimnasia y Esgrima (LP)
- Godoy Cruz
- Huracán
- Independiente
- Lanús
- Newell's Old Boys
- Patronato
- Platense
- Racing
- River Plate
- Rosario Central
- San Lorenzo
- Sarmiento (J)
- Talleres (C)
- Unión
- Vélez Sarsfield

=== Second Level ===
==== Primera Nacional ====
The top seven teams of each zone and the best eighth-placed team of the 2021 tournament qualified.

- Agropecuario Argentino
- Almirante Brown
- Barracas Central
- Belgrano
- Brown
- Deportivo Morón
- Ferro Carril Oeste
- Gimnasia y Esgrima (J)
- Gimnasia y Esgrima (M)
- Güemes (SdE)
- Independiente Rivadavia
- Quilmes
- San Martín (T)
- Tigre
- Tristán Suárez

=== Third Level ===
==== Primera B Metropolitana ====
The top six teams of the 2021 Primera B tournament qualified.

- Acassuso
- Colegiales
- Flandria
- J. J. de Urquiza
- Los Andes
- Sacachispas

==== Torneo Federal A ====
The top five teams of each zone of the 2021 tournament qualified.

- Central Norte (S)
- Chaco For Ever
- Cipolletti
- Deportivo Madryn
- Gimnasia y Tiro
- Olimpo
- Racing (C)
- Sol de Mayo
- Sportivo Las Parejas
- Sportivo Peñarol

=== Fourth Level ===
==== Primera C Metropolitana ====
The top four teams of the 2021 Primera C tournament qualified.

- Central Córdoba (R)
- Dock Sud
- Ituzaingó
- Laferrere

=== Fifth Level ===
==== Primera D Metropolitana ====
The top-three teams of 2021 Primera D tournament qualified.

- Defensores de Cambaceres
- Liniers
- Puerto Nuevo

== Round and draw dates ==
Phase	Round	Draw date	Dates
Final Stage	Round of 64	22 December 2021	23 February – 1 June 2022
Final Stage	Round of 32	22 December 2021	8 June – 4 August 2022
Final Stage	Round of 16	22 December 2021	9 August – 15 September 2022
Final Stage	Quarter-finals	22 December 2021	27 – 28 September 2022
Final Stage	Semi-finals	22 December 2021	26 October 2022
Final Stage	Final	22 December 2021	30 October 2022

== Final Rounds ==
=== Draw ===
The draw for the Final Rounds was held on 22 December 2021, 15:00 at AFA Futsal Stadium in Ezeiza. The 64 qualified teams were divided in four groups. Teams were seeded by their historical performance and Division. Champions of AFA tournaments playing in Argentine Primera División were allocated to Group A. The matches were drawn from the respective confronts: A vs. C; B vs. D. Some combinations were avoided for security reasons.

Group A	Group B	Group C	Group D
Argentinos Juniors; Arsenal; Banfield; Boca Juniors; Colón; Estudiantes (LP); Gimnasia y Esgrima (LP); Huracán; Independiente; Lanús; Newell's Old Boys; Racing; River Plate; Rosario Central; San Lorenzo; Vélez Sarsfield	Aldosivi; Almirante Brown; Atlético Tucumán; Barracas Central; Central Córdoba (SdE); Defensa y Justicia; Ferro Carril Oeste; Godoy Cruz; Independiente Rivadavia; Patronato; Platense; Quilmes; Sarmiento (J); Talleres (C); Tigre; Unión	Central Córdoba (R); Central Norte (S); Chaco For Ever; Cipolletti; Defensores de Cambaceres; Deportivo Madryn; Dock Sud; Gimnasia y Tiro; Ituzaingó; Laferrere; Liniers; Olimpo; Puerto Nuevo; Racing (C); Sol de Mayo; Sportivo Las Parejas ^{[1]}; Sportivo Peñarol	Acassuso; Agropecuario Argentino; Belgrano; Brown; Colegiales; Deportivo Morón; Flandria; Gimnasia y Esgrima (J); Gimnasia y Esgrima (M); Güemes (SdE); J. J. de Urquiza; Los Andes; Sacachispas; San Martín (T); Tristán Suárez

^{1} After the draw between Group A and Group C, the remaining Group C team Sportivo Las Parejas was moved to Group D.

=== Bracket ===
==== Upper bracket ====
Round of 64
Banfield	3
Dock Sud	1
Unión (p)	1 (4)
Sportivo Las Parejas	1 (3)
Central Córdoba (SdE)	0 (3)
Gimnasia y Esgrima (J) (p)	0 (4)
San Lorenzo	1 (2)
Racing (C) (p)	1 (4)
Lanús	5
Defensores de Cambaceres	0
Godoy Cruz	2
Tristán Suárez	0
Platense	1 (1)
Belgrano (p)	1 (4)
Estudiantes (LP)	2
Puerto Nuevo	1
Vélez Sarsfield	5
Cipolletti	0
Independiente Rivadavia	2
Gimnasia y Esgrima (M)	0
Atlético Tucumán	2
Brown	0
Independiente (p)	1 (4)
Central Norte (S)	1 (3)
Arsenal	0 (4)
Chaco For Ever (p)	0 (5)
Talleres (C)	4
Güemes (SdE)	0
Aldosivi (p)	1 (3)
Colegiales	1 (2)
Newell's Old Boys	3
Ituzaingó	1

Round of 32
Banfield	2
Unión	1
Gimnasia y Esgrima (J)	1
Racing (C)	0
Lanús	1
Godoy Cruz	3
Belgrano	1
Estudiantes (LP)	0
Vélez Sarsfield	1
Independiente Rivadavia	0
Atlético Tucumán	0
Independiente	1
Chaco For Ever	0 (3)
Talleres (C) (p)	0 (4)
Aldosivi	2
Newell's Old Boys	4

Round of 16
Banfield	2
Gimnasia y Esgrima (J)	0
Godoy Cruz (p)	0 (5)
Belgrano	0 (4)
Vélez Sarsfield	0
Independiente	2
Talleres (C)	2
Newell's Old Boys	1

Quarter-finals
Banfield (p)	1 (3)
Godoy Cruz	1 (1)
Independiente	0 (2)
Talleres (C) (p)	0 (4)

Semi-finals
Banfield	0
Talleres (C)	1

==== Lower bracket ====
Round of 64
Gimnasia y Esgrima (LP)	1
Liniers	0
Sarmiento (J)	0
Flandria	2
Patronato	2
Deportivo Morón	0
Colón	2
Sportivo Peñarol	1
Argentinos Juniors	2
Olimpo	0
Defensa y Justicia	4
Sacachispas	1
Barracas Central	4
Acassuso	1
River Plate	5
Laferrere	0
Racing	3
Gimnasia y Tiro	1
Almirante Brown	0
Agropecuario Argentino	2
Ferro Carril Oeste	4
J. J. de Urquiza	0
Boca Juniors	4
Central Córdoba (R)	1
Rosario Central (p)	1 (5)
Sol de Mayo	1 (3)
Quilmes	2
San Martín (T)	0
Tigre (awarded)	––
Los Andes	––
Huracán	0 (3)
Deportivo Madryn (p)	0 (4)

Round of 32
Gimnasia y Esgrima (LP)	2
Flandria	0
Patronato (p)	1 (3)
Colón	1 (2)
Argentinos Juniors	0
Defensa y Justicia	1
Barracas Central	0
River Plate	3
Racing	1
Agropecuario Argentino	2
Ferro Carril Oeste	0
Boca Juniors	1
Rosario Central	1 (2)
Quilmes (p)	1 (4)
Tigre	3 (2)
Deportivo Madryn (p)	3 (4)

Round of 16
Gimnasia y Esgrima (LP)	1
Patronato	2
Defensa y Justicia	0
River Plate	4
Agropecuario Argentino	0
Boca Juniors	1
Quilmes (p)	1 (4)
Deportivo Madryn	1 (1)

Quarter-finals
Patronato (p)	2 (4)
River Plate	2 (3)
Boca Juniors	3
Quilmes	2

Semi-finals
Patronato (p)	1 (3)
Boca Juniors	1 (2)

=== Round of 64 ===
The Round of 64 had 10 qualified teams from the Torneo Federal A, 13 qualified teams from the Metropolitan Zone (6 teams from Primera B Metropolitana; 4 teams from Primera C Metropolitana and 3 teams from Primera D Metropolitana), 15 teams from Primera Nacional and 26 teams from Primera División. The round was played between 23 February and 1 June 2022, in a single knock-out match format. The 32 winning teams advanced to the Round of 32.

2 March 2022	Banfield	3–1	Dock Sud	Quilmes, Pcia. de Buenos Aires
17:10	Álvarez 50'; Cruz 71'; Dátolo 78'	Report	Greco 31'	Stadium: Centenario Ciudad de Quilmes; Referee: Nicolás Ramírez

24 May 2022	Huracán	0–0 (3–4 p)	Deportivo Madryn	Rosario, Pcia. de Santa Fe
15:35		Report		Stadium: Marcelo Bielsa; Referee: Jorge Baliño
	Penalties
	Cristaldo (penalty scored); Galván (penalty scored); Acevedo (penalty missed); Hezze (penalty scored); Cóccaro (penalty missed)		(penalty scored) Marinucci; (penalty scored) López; (penalty scored) Mansilla; (penalty scored) Recalde

26 May 2022	Gimnasia y Esgrima (LP)	1–0	Liniers	Caseros, Pcia. de Buenos Aires
17:10	Tarragona 22'	Report		Stadium: Ciudad de Caseros; Referee: José Carreras

4 May 2022	Newell's Old Boys	3–1	Ituzaingó	Paraná, Pcia. de Entre Ríos
19:00	Rossi 10'; Garro 30'; Sforza 43'	Report	Miranda Moreira 34'	Stadium: Presbítero Bartolomé Grella; Referee: Pablo Giménez

1 March 2022	Vélez Sarsfield	5–0	Cipolletti	Lanús, Pcia. de Buenos Aires
19:10	Díaz 37'; Pellegrino 49'; Fernández 73'; Orellano 77'; Castro 88'	Report		Stadium: Ciudad de Lanús – Néstor Díaz Pérez; Referee: Mario Ejarque

9 March 2022	River Plate	5–0	Laferrere	Salta, Pcia. de Salta
21:10	Zuculini 25'; Álvarez 33'; Quintero 45' (pen.); Herrera 79'; Paradela 86'	Report		Stadium: Padre Ernesto Martearena; Referee: Pablo Giménez

27 March 2022	Racing	3–1	Gimnasia y Tiro	Santiago del Estero, Pcia. de Santiago del Estero
21:10	Martínez 6'; Copetti 59'; Garré 61'	Report	Chaves 74'	Stadium: Único Madre de Ciudades; Referee: Diego Abal

25 March 2022	Estudiantes (LP)	2–1	Puerto Nuevo	Córdoba, Pcia. de Córdoba
15:10	Lattanzio 62'; Orosco 90+2'	Report	Meza 53'	Stadium: El Gigante de Alberdi; Referee: Pablo Echavarría

23 February 2022	Lanús	5–0	Defensores de Cambaceres	Quilmes, Pcia. de Buenos Aires
19:10	López 30' (pen.), 73', 76'; Aude 87'; Orozco 90'	Report		Stadium: Centenario Ciudad de Quilmes; Referee: Nazareno Arasa

2 March 2022	Boca Juniors	4–1	Central Córdoba (R)	Córdoba, Pcia. de Córdoba
21:10	Orsini 13', 66'; Vázquez 79'; Zeballos 90+4' (pen.)	Report	Di Vanni 26'	Stadium: Mario Alberto Kempes; Referee: Jorge Baliño

9 March 2022	Argentinos Juniors	2–0	Olimpo	Rosario, Pcia. de Santa Fe
17:10	Ávalos 50', 67'	Report		Stadium: Marcelo Bielsa; Referee: Silvio Trucco

26 March 2022	Independiente	1–1 (4–3 p)	Central Norte (S)	Córdoba, Pcia. de Córdoba
20:00	Blanco 45'	Report	Ríos 33'	Stadium: Mario Alberto Kempes; Referee: Pablo Dóvalo
	Penalties
	Togni (penalty scored); Benavídez (penalty scored); Benegas (penalty scored); Pozzo (penalty scored)		(penalty scored) Lesman; (penalty scored) Reyes; (penalty scored) Osores; (penalty missed) Suica; (penalty missed) Serrano

15 March 2022	Arsenal	0–0 (4–5 p)	Chaco For Ever	Santa Fe, Pcia. de Santa Fe
21:10		Report		Stadium: 15 de Abril; Referee: Jorge Broggi
	Penalties
	Lomonaco (penalty scored); Pérez (penalty scored); Miloc (penalty missed); Colmán (penalty scored); Chimino (penalty missed); Torres (penalty scored); Rivero (penalty missed)		(penalty scored) Díaz; (penalty missed) Triverio; (penalty scored) Canever; (penalty missed) Martínez; (penalty scored) Romero; (penalty scored) Chacana; (penalty scored) Politano

1 March 2022	Colón	2–1	Sportivo Peñarol	Rafaela, Pcia. de Santa Fe
21:30	Ábila 24'; Pierotti 39'	Report	Varona 62'	Stadium: Nuevo Monumental; Referee: Héctor Paletta

13 May 2022	Rosario Central	1–1 (5–3 p)	Sol de Mayo	Santa Fe, Pcia. de Santa Fe
18:35	Gamba 15' (pen.)	Report	Elgorriaga 26'	Stadium: 15 de Abril; Referee: Andrés Merlos
	Penalties
	Gamba (penalty scored); Ferreyra (penalty scored); Montoya (penalty scored); Servio (penalty scored); Buonanotte (penalty scored)		(penalty scored) Flores; (penalty scored) Paredes; (penalty scored) García; (penalty missed) Escobares

13 April 2022	San Lorenzo	1–1 (2–4 p)	Racing (C)	La Punta, Pcia. de San Luis
21:00	Cerutti 38'	Report	Rivero 50'	Stadium: Provincial Juan Gilberto Funes; Referee: Fernando Espinoza
	Penalties
	Ortigoza (penalty scored); Donatti (penalty missed); Martegani (penalty missed); Cerutti (penalty scored)		(penalty scored) Rivero; (penalty scored) Giménez; (penalty scored) Murialdo; (penalty scored) Fernández

5 April 2022	Central Córdoba (SdE)	0–0 (3–4 p)	Gimnasia y Esgrima (J)	La Rioja, Pcia. de La Rioja
19:30		Report		Stadium: Carlos Augusto Mercado Luna; Referee: Jorge Baliño
	Penalties
	López (penalty scored); Grahl (penalty scored); Martínez (penalty scored); Ramírez (penalty missed); Riaño (penalty missed); Bay (penalty missed)		(penalty missed) Cosaro; (penalty scored) L. González; (penalty scored) Gatti; (penalty missed) Tunessi; (penalty scored) Belleggia; (penalty scored) Hernández

27 April 2022	Quilmes	2–0	San Martín (T)	La Rioja, Pcia. de La Rioja
18:00	Machado 6' (pen.); Molina 58'	Report		Stadium: Carlos Augusto Mercado Luna; Referee: Ariel Penel

12 May 2022	Patronato	2–0	Deportivo Morón	Santa Fe, Pcia. de Santa Fe
20:10	Rodríguez 52'; Castro 55'	Report		Stadium: Brigadier General Estanislao López; Referee: Silvio Trucco

16 March 2022	Talleres (C)	4–0	Güemes (SdE)	Salta, Pcia. de Salta
20:00	Girotti 18', 52'; Valoyes 42'; Esquivel 46'	Report		Stadium: Padre Ernesto Martearena; Referee: Nazareno Arasa

27 April 2022	Atlético Tucumán	2–0	Brown	Salta, Pcia. de Salta
20:35	Orihuela 41'; Heredia 78'	Report		Stadium: Padre Ernesto Martearena; Referee: Pablo Echavarría

30 March 2022	Defensa y Justicia	4–1	Sacachispas	Córdoba, Pcia. de Córdoba
20:10	Rotondi 15'; Errecalde 33' (o.g.); Merentiel 62'; Albertengo 83'	Report	Pinedo 63'	Stadium: El Gigante de Alberdi; Referee: Ramiro López

20 April 2022	Ferro Carril Oeste	4–0	J. J. de Urquiza	Cutral Có, Pcia. de Neuquén
15:35	E. Díaz 43', 58'; Mosca 48'; Márquez 73'	Report		Stadium: Alvaro Pedro Ducás; Referee: Maximiliano Ramírez

13 May 2022	Godoy Cruz	2–0	Tristán Suárez	La Punta, Pcia. de San Luis
20:35	Allende 3'; S. Rodríguez 59'	Report		Stadium: Provincial Juan Gilberto Funes; Referee: Sebastián Zunino

25 May 2022	Platense	1–1 (1–4 p)	Belgrano	La Rioja, Pcia. de La Rioja
15:05	Bergessio 6'	Report	Susvielles 39'	Stadium: Carlos Augusto Mercado Luna; Referee: Ariel Penel
	Penalties
	Mansilla (penalty missed); Ruiz Díaz (penalty missed); Suso (penalty scored)		(penalty scored) Rébola; (penalty scored) Hesar; (penalty scored) Susvielles; (penalty scored) Vegetti

24 February 2022	Almirante Brown	0–2	Agropecuario Argentino	Sarandí, Pcia. de Buenos Aires
21:10		Report	Muñoz 70'; Dening 76'	Stadium: Julio Humberto Grondona; Referee: Diego Ceballos

12 May 2022	Barracas Central	4–1	Acassuso	Caseros, Pcia. de Buenos Aires
17:10	Valenzuela 32' (pen.), 56'; Arias 51'; Vázquez 61'	Report	Arce 79'	Stadium: Ciudad de Caseros; Referee: Diego Ceballos

23 February 2022	Independiente Rivadavia	2–0	Gimnasia y Esgrima (M)	Mendoza, Pcia. de Mendoza
22:10	Ambrogio 7'; Quiroga 62'	Report		Stadium: Malvinas Argentinas; Referee: Lucas Comesaña

3 May 2022	Aldosivi	1–1 (3–2 p)	Colegiales	Córdoba, Pcia. de Córdoba
15:35	Torres 22'	Report	Kestler 44'	Stadium: El Gigante de Alberdi; Referee: Nazareno Arasa
	Penalties
	Gino (penalty scored); Iritier (penalty scored); Iñiguez (penalty missed); Rinaldi (penalty missed); T. Martínez (penalty missed); Maciel (penalty scored)		(penalty scored) Falón; (penalty missed) Herrera; (penalty scored) Luna; (penalty missed) Torres; (penalty missed) Martínez; (penalty missed) Kestler

4 May 2022	Sarmiento (J)	0–2	Flandria	Córdoba, Pcia. de Córdoba
16:45		Report	Gordillo 13' (pen.); Taborda 26'	Stadium: El Gigante de Alberdi; Referee: Adrián Franklin

1 June 2022	Tigre	Awarded (Note: The match, originally scheduled to be played on 1 June 2022, 19:30 at the Estadio Ciudad de Lanús – Néstor Díaz Pérez, Lanús was rescheduled for 1 June 2022, 20:00 at the Estadio Nuevo Francisco Urbano in Morón for security reasons. As the match had to be played behind closed doors, Los Andes refused to play in protest. The referee Lucas Comesaña suspended the match and sent a report to AFA. The AFA Disciplinary Court, on 9 June 2022, awarded the game to Tigre and Los Andes were banned from 2023 Copa Argentina, on 30 June 2022.)	Los Andes	Morón, Pcia. de Buenos Aires
20:00		Report		Stadium: Nuevo Francisco Urbano; Referee: Lucas Comesaña

23 March 2022	Unión	1–1 (4–3 p)	Sportivo Las Parejas	Rosario, Pcia. de Santa Fe
19:10	Ramos 51' (pen.)	Report	Bocchietti 88'	Stadium: Marcelo Bielsa; Referee: Nazareno Arasa
	Penalties
	Ramos (penalty scored); Peralta Bauer (penalty scored); González (penalty scored); Polenta (penalty missed); Esquivel (penalty missed); Nardoni (penalty scored)		(penalty scored) Sperduti; (penalty scored) Díaz; (penalty missed) López; (penalty scored) Jominy; (penalty missed) Pizzichini; (penalty missed) Vester

=== Round of 32 ===
This round had 32 qualified teams from the Round of 64. The round was played between 8 June and 4 August 2022, in a single knock-out match format. The 16 winning teams advanced to the Round of 16.

12 July 2022	Banfield	2–1	Unión	San Nicolás de los Arroyos, Pcia. de Buenos Aires
21:10	Dátolo 41'; Coronel 56'	Report	Luna Diale 15'	Stadium: Único de San Nicolás; Referee: Lucas Comesaña

15 June 2022	Gimnasia y Esgrima (J)	1–0	Racing (C)	La Rioja, Pcia. de La Rioja
14:00	Cosaro 37'	Report		Stadium: Carlos Augusto Mercado Luna; Referee: Mario Ejarque

13 July 2022	Lanús	1–3	Godoy Cruz	Córdoba, Pcia. de Córdoba
18:30	Orozco 23'	Report	Allende 70'; S. Rodríguez 88'; Ojeda 90+4'	Stadium: El Gigante de Alberdi; Referee: Pablo Echavarría

13 July 2022	Belgrano	1–0	Estudiantes (LP)	Santa Fe, Pcia. de Santa Fe
16:00	Susvielles 60' (pen.)	Report		Stadium: 15 de Abril; Referee: Darío Herrera

8 June 2022	Vélez Sarsfield	1–0	Independiente Rivadavia	La Punta, Pcia. de San Luis
22:10	Osorio 84'	Report		Stadium: Provincial Juan Gilberto Funes; Referee: Andrés Gariano

23 June 2022	Atlético Tucumán	0–1	Independiente	San Salvador de Jujuy, Pcia. de Jujuy
20:05		Report	Cazares 78'	Stadium: 23 de Agosto; Referee: Fernando Echenique

22 June 2022	Chaco For Ever	0–0 (3–4 p)	Talleres (C)	Salta, Pcia. de Salta
21:10		Report		Stadium: Padre Ernesto Martearena; Referee: Jorge Baliño
	Penalties
	Allende (penalty missed); Cuello (penalty missed); Canever (penalty missed); Mattalía (penalty scored); Triverio (penalty scored); Romero (penalty scored); Valdez (penalty missed)		(penalty scored) Santos; (penalty missed) Catalán; (penalty missed) Garro; (penalty scored) Díaz; (penalty missed) Girotti; (penalty scored) Pérez; (penalty scored) Buffarini

3 August 2022	Aldosivi	2–4	Newell's Old Boys	San Nicolás de los Arroyos, Pcia. de Buenos Aires
21:10	B. Martínez 14'; Tobares 45'	Report	Balzi 20'; Garro 31', 57'; Lema 76' (pen.)	Stadium: Único de San Nicolás; Referee: Jorge Baliño

29 June 2022	Gimnasia y Esgrima (LP)	2–0	Flandria	Rafaela, Pcia. de Santa Fe
18:05	Soldano 33', 85'	Report		Stadium: Nuevo Monumental; Referee: Lucas Comesaña

22 June 2022	Patronato	1–1 (3–2 p)	Colón	Rosario, Pcia. de Santa Fe
18:00	Sosa 72'	Report	Ábila 55'	Stadium: Marcelo Bielsa; Referee: Pablo Dóvalo
	Penalties
	García (penalty missed); Sosa (penalty scored); Barinaga (penalty missed); Leys (penalty scored); Lozano (penalty scored)		(penalty missed) Goltz; (penalty scored) Bernardi; (penalty missed) Aliendro; (penalty scored) Lértora; (penalty missed) Ábila

6 July 2022	Argentinos Juniors	0–1	Defensa y Justicia	La Plata, Pcia. de Buenos Aires
17:00		Report	Gutiérrez 37'	Stadium: Juan Carmelo Zerillo; Referee: Hernán Mastrángelo

13 July 2022	Barracas Central	0–3	River Plate	Villa Mercedes, Pcia. de San Luis
21:30		Report	Casco 21'; Palavecino 65', 73'	Stadium: Único de Villa Mercedes; Referee: Andrés Merlos

8 June 2022	Racing	1–2	Agropecuario Argentino	San Salvador de Jujuy, Pcia. de Jujuy
20:00	Chancalay 29'	Report	Blando 43', 45+2'	Stadium: 23 de Agosto; Referee: Nicolás Ramírez

8 June 2022	Ferro Carril Oeste	0–1	Boca Juniors	La Rioja, Pcia. de La Rioja
16:00		Report	Villa 78'	Stadium: Carlos Augusto Mercado Luna; Referee: Hernán Mastrángelo

4 August 2022	Rosario Central	1–1 (2–4 p)	Quilmes	Córdoba, Pcia. de Córdoba
16:10	Servio 86' (pen.)	Report	González 42'	Stadium: El Gigante de Alberdi; Referee: Nicolás Lamolina
	Penalties
	Servio (penalty scored); Almada (penalty missed); J. Rodríguez (penalty missed); Infantino (penalty scored)		(penalty scored) Evangelista; (penalty missed) Pavone; (penalty scored) Bonetto; (penalty scored) Cortave; (penalty scored) Bindella

27 July 2022	Tigre	3–3 (2–4 p)	Deportivo Madryn	La Plata, Pcia. de Buenos Aires
17:10	Cabrera 65'; Castro 81'; Obando 90+1'	Report	Marinucci 49'; L. González 67', 74'	Stadium: Juan Carmelo Zerillo; Referee: Fernando Espinoza
	Penalties
	Magnín (penalty scored); Retegui (penalty missed); Obando (penalty scored); Prieto (penalty missed)		(penalty scored) Michelena; (penalty scored) L. González; (penalty missed) Hernández Le Pors; (penalty scored) Necul; (penalty scored) C. González

=== Round of 16 ===
This round had the 16 qualified teams from the Round of 32. The round was played between August 9 and September 15, in a single knock-out match format. The 8 winning teams advanced to the Quarterfinals.

31 August 2022	Banfield	2–0	Gimnasia y Esgrima (J)	Córdoba, Pcia. de Córdoba
18:30	Enrique 44'; Dátolo 60'	Report		Stadium: Presidente Perón; Referee: Fernando Echenique

31 August 2022	Godoy Cruz	0–0 (5–4 p)	Belgrano	Villa Mercedes, Pcia. de San Luis
16:00		Report		Stadium: Único de Villa Mercedes; Referee: Patricio Loustau
	Penalties
	Ortiz (penalty scored); Vega (penalty scored); S. Rodríguez (penalty scored); Abrego (penalty scored); Ojeda (penalty scored)		(penalty scored) Rébola; (penalty scored) Bernardello; (penalty scored) Susvielles; (penalty scored) Vegetti; (penalty missed) Sánchez

15 September 2022	Vélez Sarsfield	0–2	Independiente	San Salvador de Jujuy, Pcia. de Jujuy
21:10		Report	Fernández 11'; Benegas 56'	Stadium: 23 de Agosto; Referee: Ariel Penel

7 September 2022	Talleres (C)	2–1	Newell's Old Boys	La Punta, Pcia. de San Luis
21:10	Ditta 69' (o.g.); Giacone 88'	Report	García 45+1' (pen.)	Stadium: Provincial Juan Gilberto Funes; Referee: Ariel Penel

9 August 2022	Gimnasia y Esgrima (LP)	1–2	Patronato	Resistencia, Pcia. de Chaco
16:10	Soldano 39'	Report	Estigarribia 9', 64'	Stadium: Centenario; Referee: Silvio Trucco

31 August 2022	Defensa y Justicia	0–4	River Plate	Resistencia, Pcia. de Chaco
21:30		Report	Solari 4', 51', 82'; Beltrán 30'	Stadium: Centenario; Referee: Pablo Echavarría

10 August 2022	Agropecuario Argentino	0–1	Boca Juniors	Salta, Pcia. de Salta
21:10		Report	Fernández 25'	Stadium: Padre Ernesto Martearena; Referee: Maximiliano Nicolás Ramírez

7 September 2022	Quilmes	1–1 (4–1 p)	Deportivo Madryn	La Plata, Pcia. de Buenos Aires
16:10	Batista 36'	Report	C. González 90+1'	Stadium: Juan Carmelo Zerillo; Referee: Silvio Trucco
	Penalties
	Evangelista (penalty scored); Cortave (penalty scored); Bonetto (penalty scored); Moreno (penalty scored)		(penalty scored) Michelena; (penalty missed) L. González; (penalty missed) Castillo

=== Quarter-finals ===
This round had the 8 qualified teams from the Round of 16. The round was played between 27 and 28 September 2022, in a single knock-out match format. The 4 winning teams advanced to the semi-finals.

27 September 2022	Banfield	1–1 (3–1 p)	Godoy Cruz	La Punta, Pcia. de San Luis
16:00	Dátolo 6' (pen.)	Report	Larrosa 41'	Stadium: Provincial Juan Gilberto Funes; Referee: Jorge Baliño
	Penalties
	Chávez (penalty scored); Mago (penalty scored); Perales (penalty scored); Urzi (penalty missed)		(penalty missed) Acevedo; (penalty missed) Allende; (penalty scored) S. Rodríguez; (penalty missed) Vega

28 September 2022	Independiente	0–0 (2–4 p)	Talleres (C)	Resistencia, Pcia. de Chaco
16:00		Report		Stadium: Centenario; Referee: Hernán Mastrángelo
	Penalties
	Benegas (penalty scored); Insaurralde (penalty missed); Vallejo (penalty missed); Ferreyra (penalty scored)		(penalty scored) Valoyes; (penalty scored) Álvarez; (penalty missed) Garro; (penalty scored) Díaz; (penalty scored) Buffarini

28 September 2022	Patronato	2–2 (4–3 p)	River Plate	La Rioja, Pcia. de La Rioja
19:00	Estigarribia 33'; Herrera 46'	Report	Zuculini 10'; Quintero 52'	Stadium: Carlos Augusto Mercado Luna; Referee: Fernando Espinoza
	Penalties
	Mosevich (penalty scored); Rodríguez (penalty missed); Sosa (penalty scored); Giani (penalty scored); Valdez Chamorro (penalty scored)		(penalty scored) Quintero; (penalty missed) Zuculini; (penalty scored) Borja; (penalty scored) Barco; (penalty missed) Suárez

28 September 2022	Boca Juniors	3–2	Quilmes	Mendoza, Pcia. de Mendoza
22:00	Benedetto 7'; Morales 34'; Langoni 59'	Report	Bonetto 4'; Pavone 64'	Stadium: Malvinas Argentinas; Referee: Ariel Penel

=== Semi-finals ===
This round had the 4 qualified teams from the Quarter-finals. The round was played on 26 October 2022, in a single knock-out match format. The 2 winning teams advanced to the Final.

26 October 2022	Banfield	0–1	Talleres (C)	Rosario, Pcia. de Santa Fe
18:00		Report	Santos 79'	Stadium: Marcelo Bielsa; Referee: Germán Delfino

26 October 2022	Patronato	1–1 (3–2 p)	Boca Juniors	San Juan, Pcia. de San Juan
21:30	Estigarribia 32'	Report	Villa 73' (pen.)	Stadium: San Juan del Bicentenario; Referee: Yael Falcón Pérez
	Penalties
	Acevedo (penalty scored); Estigarribia (penalty scored); Giani (penalty missed); Cobos (penalty scored)		(penalty missed) Romero; (penalty scored) Langoni; (penalty missed) Varela; (penalty scored) Sández; (penalty missed) Villa

=== Final ===
30 October 2022
20:40

Talleres (C)	0–1	Patronato
	Report	Banega 78'

Malvinas Argentinas, Mendoza
Referee: Fernando Rapallini

== Top goalscorers ==
Rank	Player	Club	Goals
1	(Argentina) Jesús Dátolo	Banfield	4
1	(Argentina) Marcelo Estigarribia	Patronato	4
3	(Argentina) Juan Garro	Newell's Old Boys	3
3	(Argentina) José Manuel López	Lanús	3
3	(Argentina) Pablo Solari	River Plate	3
3	(Argentina) Franco Soldano	Gimnasia y Esgrima (LP)	3
7	(Argentina) Ramón Ábila	Colón	2
7	(Argentina) Tadeo Allende	Godoy Cruz	2
7	(Paraguay) Gabriel Ávalos	Argentinos Juniors	2
7	(Argentina) Brian Blando	Agropecuario Argentino	2
7	(Argentina) Enzo Díaz	Ferro Carril Oeste	2
7	(Argentina) Federico Girotti	Talleres (C)	2
7	(Argentina) Lucas González	Deportivo Madryn	2
7	(Argentina) Franco Orozco	Lanús	2
7	(Argentina) Nicolás Orsini	Boca Juniors	2
7	(Argentina) Agustín Palavecino	River Plate	2
7	(Colombia) Juan Fernando Quintero	River Plate	2
7	(Uruguay) Salomón Rodríguez	Godoy Cruz	2
7	(Argentina) Joaquín Susvielles	Belgrano	2
7	(Argentina) Fernando Valenzuela	Barracas Central	2
7	(Colombia) Sebastián Villa	Boca Juniors	2
7	(Argentina) Bruno Zuculini	River Plate	2

Source: Copa Argentina

== Team of the tournament ==
Team
Goalkeeper	Defenders	Midfielders	Forwards
Facundo Altamirano (Patronato)	Enzo Díaz (Talleres (C)); Carlos Quintana (Patronato); Rafa Pérez (Talleres (C))	Jesús Dátolo (Banfield); Nicolás Castro (Patronato); Guillermo Fernández (Boca Juniors); Julián Bonetto (Quilmes)	Tadeo Allende (Godoy Cruz); Marcelo Estigarribia (Patronato); Juan Garro (Newell's Old Boys)
Substitutes
Alan Aguerre (Talleres (C)); Facundo Cambeses (Banfield)	Emanuel Coronel (Banfield); Sergio Barreto (Independiente)	Bruno Zuculini (River Plate); Juan Fernando Quintero (River Plate)	Lucas González (Deportivo Madryn); Franco Soldano (Gimnasia y Esgrima (LP)); Leonardo Marinucci (Deportivo Madryn); Sebastián Villa (Boca Juniors); Joaquín Susvielles (Belgrano); Brian Blando (Agropecuario Argentino)
Coach
Facundo Sava (Patronato)

Source: Copa Argentina
