= 2022 Copa Argentina final =

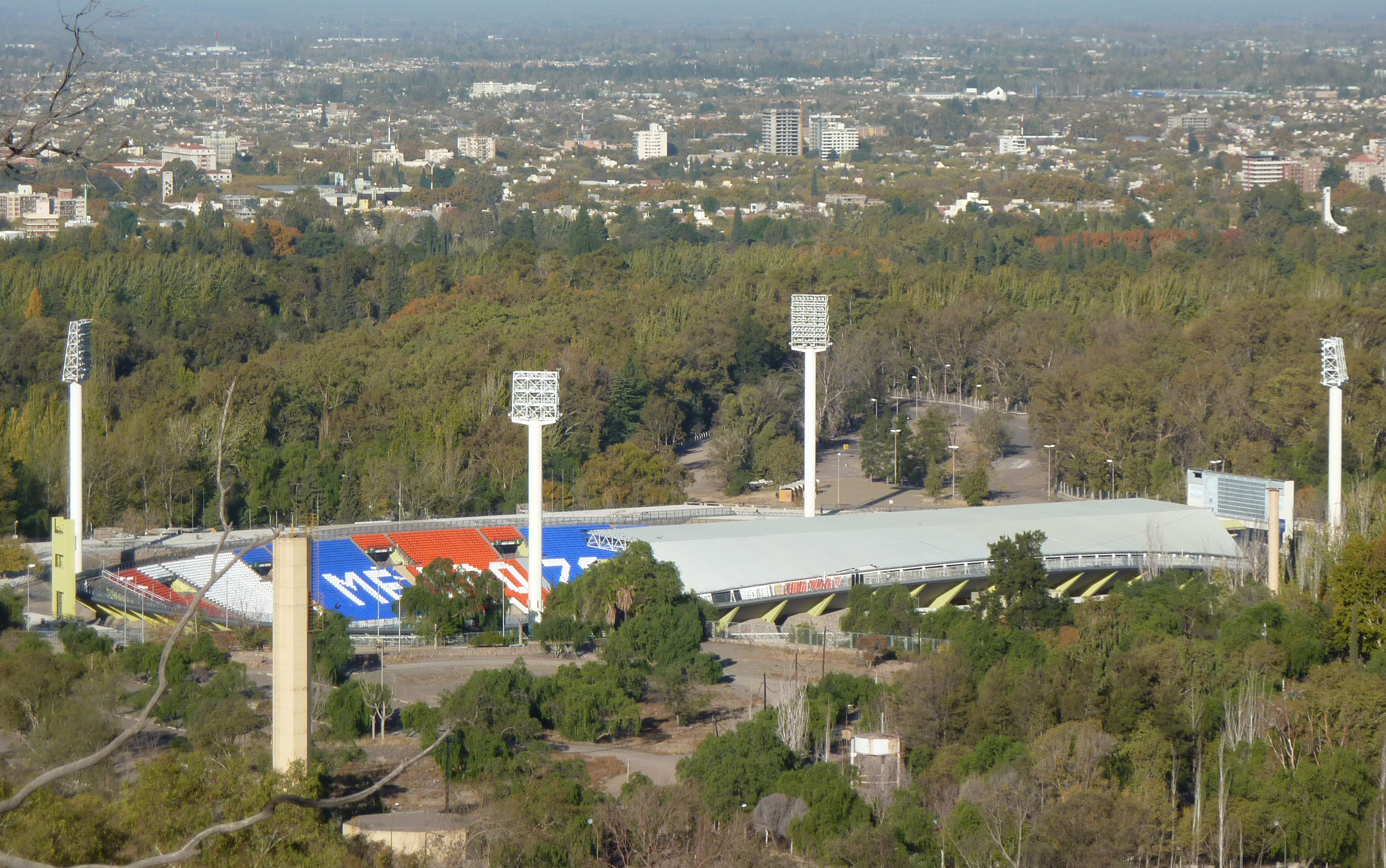
- Estadio Malvinas Argentinas, venue
- Event: 2021–22 Copa Argentina
Talleres (C)	Patronato
0	1
- Date: 30 October 2022
- Venue: Estadio Malvinas Argentinas, Mendoza
- Man of the Match: Carlos Quintana (Patronato)
- Referee: Fernando Rapallini

The 2022 Copa Argentina final was the 62nd and final match of the 2021–22 Copa Argentina. It was played on 30 October 2022 at Estadio Malvinas Argentinas in Mendoza between Talleres (C) and Patronato.

Patronato defeated Talleres (C) by a 1–0 score to win their first title in the tournament. As winners, they qualified for the 2023 Copa Libertadores group stage and earned the right to play against the winners of the 2022 Argentine Primera División in the 2022 Supercopa Argentina.

== Qualified teams ==
Team	Previous finals app.
Talleres (C)	1 (2020)
Patronato	None

Bold indicates winning years

== Road to the final ==
Talleres (C)			Round	Patronato		
Opponent	Venue	Score		Opponent	Venue	Score
Güemes (SdE)	Salta	4–0	Round of 64	Deportivo Morón	Santa Fe	2–0
Chaco For Ever	Salta	0–0 (4–3 p)	Round of 32	Colón	Rosario	1–1 (3–2 p)
Newell's Old Boys	La Punta	2–1	Round of 16	Gimnasia y Esgrima (LP)	Resistencia	2–1
Independiente	Resistencia	0–0 (4–2 p)	Quarter-finals	River Plate	La Rioja	2–2 (4–3 p)
Banfield	Rosario	1–0	Semi-finals	Boca Juniors	San Juan	1–1 (3–2 p)

== Match details ==
2021–22 Copa Argentina Final
30 October 2022
20:40

Talleres (C)	0–1	Patronato
	Report	Banega 78'

Estadio Malvinas Argentinas, Mendoza
Referee: Fernando Rapallini

**Talleres (C)**	**Patronato**

GK	1	(Argentina) Alan Aguerre (c)
DF	29	(Argentina) Gastón Benavídez		(substituted off) 83'
DF	4	(Argentina) Matías Catalán
DF	2	(Colombia) Rafa Pérez	(yellow card) 88'
DF	15	(Argentina) Enzo Díaz
MF	23	(Ecuador) Alan Franco		(substituted off) 65'
MF	18	(Argentina) Rodrigo Villagra		(substituted off) 80'
MF	7	(Colombia) Diego Valoyes
MF	16	(Argentina) Rodrigo Garro		(substituted off) 80'
MF	20	(Argentina) Gonzalo Álvez		(substituted off) 65'
FW	9	(Uruguay) Michael Santos
Substitutes:
GK	22	(Argentina) Guido Herrera
DF	3	(Argentina) Lucas Suárez
DF	8	(Argentina) Julio Buffarini
DF	21	(Argentina) Ángelo Martino
MF	5	(Argentina) Favio Álvarez		(substituted on) 80'
MF	10	(Argentina) Héctor Fértoli
MF	17	(Uruguay) Christian Oliva
MF	30	(Argentina) Ulises Ortegoza		(substituted on) 65'
MF	32	(Argentina) Matías Esquivel		(substituted on) 65'
FW	19	(Argentina) Francisco Pizzini		(substituted on) 83'
FW	25	(Argentina) Leandro Espejo
FW	38	(Argentina) Matías Godoy		(substituted on) 80'
Manager:
(Argentina) Javier Gandolfi

GK	20	(Argentina) Facundo Altamirano
DF	22	(Argentina) Raúl Lozano
DF	13	(Argentina) Sergio Ojeda	(yellow card) 50'	(substituted off) 56'
DF	2	(Argentina) Carlos Quintana (c)	(yellow card) 48'
DF	30	(Argentina) Lucas Kruspzky	(yellow card) 73'
MF	8	(Argentina) Jonás Acevedo	(yellow card) 25'	(substituted off) 85'
MF	32	(Argentina) Franco Leys	(yellow card) 22'	(substituted off) 29'
MF	7	(Argentina) Nicolás Castro
MF	21	(Argentina) Sebastián Medina	(yellow card) 53'	(substituted off) 56'
FW	19	(Argentina) Marcelo Estigarribia
FW	9	(Argentina) Jonathan Herrera		(substituted off) 46'
Substitutes:
GK	34	(Argentina) Matías Mansilla
DF	4	(Argentina) Lautaro Geminiani
DF	5	(Argentina) Leonel Mosevich		(substituted on) 85'
DF	17	(Argentina) Francisco Álvarez
DF	27	(Argentina) Juan Guasone	(yellow card) 60'	(substituted on) 56'
DF	28	(Argentina) Facundo Cobos
MF	6	(Argentina) Tiago Banega		(substituted on) 29'
MF	10	(Argentina) Jorge Valdez Chamorro
MF	11	(Argentina) Matías Pardo
FW	40	(Argentina) Justo Giani		(substituted on) 56'
FW	29	(Argentina) Axel Rodríguez		(substituted on) 46'
FW	89	(Argentina) Alexander Sosa
Manager:
(Argentina) Facundo Sava

Man of the Match:
Carlos Quintana (Patronato)

Assistant referees:
Cristian Navarro
Sebastián Raineri
Fourth official:
Ariel Penel
Fifth official:
Eduardo Lucero

**Match rules**

- 90 minutes
- Penalty shoot-out if scores still level
- Twelve named substitutes
- Maximum of five substitutions

=== Statistics ===
Overall
	Talleres (C)	Patronato
Goals scored	0	1
Total shots	22	10
Shots on target	8	6
Ball possession	54%	46%
Corner kicks	5	3
Fouls committed	11	21
Offsides	1	1
Yellow cards	1	7
Red cards	0	0
