= 2022 Supercopa Argentina =

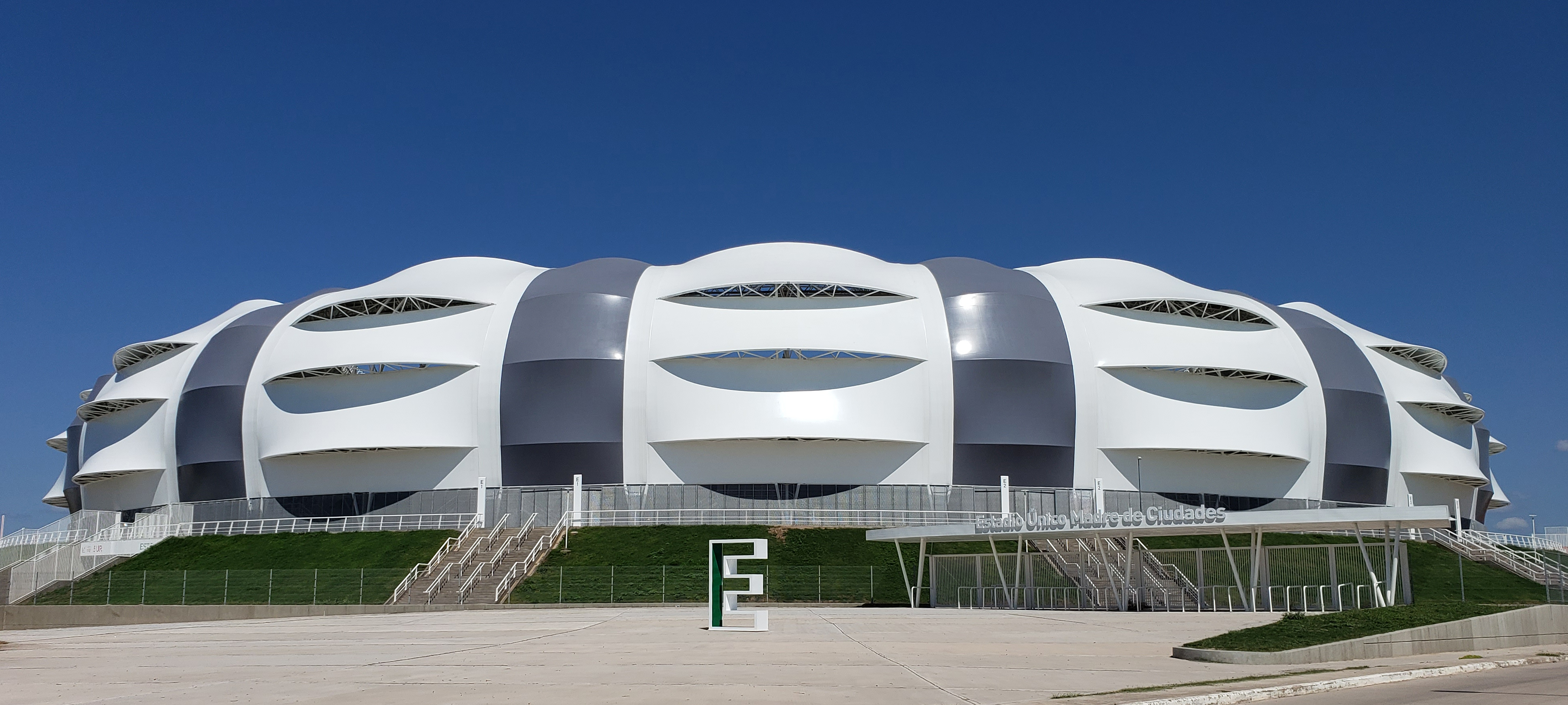
- Estadio Único Madre de Ciudades, venue
Boca Juniors	Patronato
3	0
- Date: 1 March 2023
- Venue: Estadio Único Madre de Ciudades, Santiago del Estero
- Man of the Match: Darío Benedetto
- Referee: Andrés Merlos

The 2022 Supercopa Argentina (officially the Supercopa Argentina Betsson 2022 for sponsorship reasons) was the 9th edition of the Supercopa Argentina, an annual football match contested by the winners of the Primera División and Copa Argentina competitions.

The match was played between Boca Juniors (winners of 2022 Primera División) and Patronato (winners of 2021–22 Copa Argentina) on 1 March 2023 at Estadio Único Madre de Ciudades in Santiago del Estero.

At the beginning, it had been announced that the final would be held in Abu Dhabi, nevertheless, on 30 December 2022, the Argentine Football Association announced that the cup would be played in a local venue. The decision was taken after a meeting where it was also determined that only teams considered part of the big five clubs would travel to Abu Dhabi to meet the commitments taken. The president of Patronato, Oscar Lenzi, agreed with the decision alleging economic reasons.

On December 29, Abu Dhabi was confirmed as host of the International Supercup, while the local version would be played in Argentina as usually.

Boca Juniors defeated Patronato 3–0 to win their second Supercopa Argentina title.

== Qualified teams ==
- Note: **Bold** indicates winners

Team	Qualification	Previous appearances
Boca Juniors	2022 Primera División champions	2012, 2015, 2017, **2018**
Patronato	2021–22 Copa Argentina champions	(none)

== Match ==
=== Summary ===
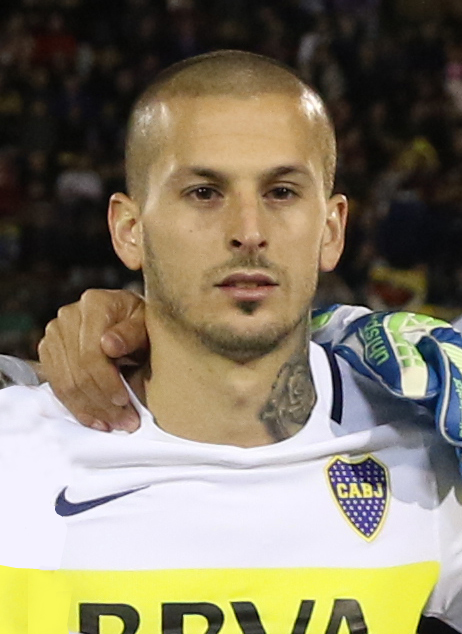
Darío Benedetto scored the three Boca Juniors goals

In the first half, the team managed by Hugo Ibarra dominated possession of the ball, the game actions and from the beginning they were in search of the goal that would allow them to open the scoring. At the 33rd minute, Matías Ruíz Díaz touched the ball with his hand inside Patronato's penalty area after a long pass from Luca Langoni so referee Andrés Merlos awarede a penalty kick to Boca Juniors, neverthess the VAR intervened and annulled the execution from twelve steps due to previous offside] position.

However, Benedetto was going to have its revenge in the 41st minute of play, when Nicolás Figal ran to the goal, left his mark behind and with his left foot threw a low and precise pass for the appearance of the scorer, who first and with his right foot wide open opened the score and unleashed a euphoric celebration.

Already in the second half, the tone of the match remained the same, but in the first moments Boca Juniors stretched the difference. At minute 6, Óscar Romero took a corner kick from the right to the far goalpost and Benedetto with an accurate header scored the 2–0 and his double in his personal account.

But there was more to come for Boca Juniors' number 9. The third goal originated in the 16th minute after a combination between Sebastián Villa and Frank Fabra, the Colombian defensor saw Benedetto alone in the middle of the opposite area, gave the ball to him, and the scorer did not fail to score his third goal that would be the definitive for a new Boca Juniors title.

=== Details ===
2022 Supercopa Argentina
1 March 2023
21:15 UTC-3

Boca Juniors	3–0	Patronato
Benedetto 41', 51', 61'	Report

Estadio Único Madre de Ciudades, Santiago del Estero
Referee: Andrés Merlos

**Boca Juniors**	**Patronato**

GK	13	(Argentina) Javier García (c)
DF	17	(Peru) Luis Advíncula
DF	2	(Argentina) Facundo Roncaglia	(yellow card) 29'	(substituted off) 46'
DF	4	(Argentina) Nicolás Figal
DF	18	(Colombia) Frank Fabra
MF	21	(Argentina) Ezequiel Fernández		(substituted off) 77'
MF	5	(Argentina) Alan Varela
MF	10	(Paraguay) Óscar Romero		(substituted off) 65'
FW	41	(Argentina) Luca Langoni		(substituted off) 65'
FW	9	(Argentina) Darío Benedetto		(substituted off) 65'
FW	22	(Colombia) Sebastián Villa
Substitutes:
GK	1	(Argentina) Sergio Romero
DF	3	(Argentina) Agustín Sández
DF	15	(Argentina) Nicolás Valentini
DF	25	(Paraguay) Bruno Valdez		(substituted on) 46'
DF	57	(Argentina) Marcelo Weigandt
MF	8	(Argentina) Guillermo Fernández
MF	11	(Argentina) Martín Payero
MF	14	(Argentina) Esteban Rolón
MF	20	(Argentina) Juan Ramírez		(substituted on) 65'
MF	36	(Argentina) Cristian Medina		(substituted on) 77'
FW	16	(Uruguay) Miguel Merentiel		(substituted on) 65'
FW	29	(Armenia) Norberto Briasco		(substituted on) 65'
Manager:
(Argentina) Hugo Ibarra

GK	1	(Argentina) Julio Salvá
DF	20	(Argentina) Matías Ruíz Díaz
DF	13	(Argentina) Sergio Ojeda (c)		(substituted off) 46'
DF	2	(Argentina) Cristian González
DF	3	(Argentina) Lucas Kruspzky
DF	11	(Argentina) Facundo Cobos
MF	14	(Argentina) Brian Nievas	(yellow card) 25'	(substituted off) 46'
MF	5	(Argentina) Nicolás Domingo		(substituted off) 83'
FW	16	(Argentina) Juan Barinaga
FW	23	(Argentina) Ignacio Russo		(substituted off) 66'
FW	7	(Argentina) Juan Cruz Esquivel		(substituted off) 66'
Substitutes:
GK	12	(Argentina) Matías Budiño
DF	4	(Argentina) Lautaro Geminiani
DF	6	(Argentina) Joel Ghirardello
MF	8	(Argentina) Damián Arce
MF	10	(Argentina) Jorge Valdez Chamorro		(substituted on) 83'
MF	15	(Argentina) Fabio Vázquez	(yellow card) 80'	(substituted on) 66'
MF	17	(Argentina) Kevin González
MF	21	(Argentina) Gastón Novero		(substituted on) 46'
MF	22	(Argentina) Nazareno Solís		(substituted on) 46'
FW	9	(Argentina) Enzo Díaz
FW	18	(Argentina) Alexander Sosa		(substituted on) 66'
FW	19	(Argentina) Mateo Levato
Manager:
(Argentina) Walter Otta

Assistant referees:
Facundo Rodríguez
Miguel Savorani
Fourth official:
Luis Lobo Medina
Video assistant referee:
Ariel Penel
Assistant video assistant referees:
Pablo González

**Match rules**

- 90 minutes.
- 30 minutes of extra time if necessary.
- Penalty shoot-out if scores still level.
- Twelve named substitutes.
- Maximum of five substitutions, with a sixth allowed in extra time.

=== Statistics ===
Overall
	Boca Juniors	Patronato
Goals scored	3	0
Total shots	15	7
Shots on target	9	5
Ball possession	62%	38%
Corner kicks	4	3
Fouls committed	6	13
Offsides	7	1
Yellow cards	1	2
Red cards	0	0

2022 Supercopa Argentina winners
**Boca Juniors**
**2nd Title**
