= Juan Barinaga =

Juan Barinaga may refer to:

- Juan Barinaga (footballer, born June 2000), Argentine midfielder
- Juan Barinaga (footballer, born October 2000), Argentine right-back
