= Gastón Martínez =

Gastón Martínez may refer to:

- Gastón Martínez (footballer, born 1989), Uruguayan midfielder
- Gastón Martínez (footballer, born 1991), Argentine defender
