= Gastón Novero =

Argentine footballer

Personal information
- Full name: Gastón Alejandro Novero
- Date of birth: 6 July 1998 (age 28)
- Place of birth: San Jorge, Santa Fe, Argentina
- Height: 1.68 m (5 ft 6 in)
- Position: Winger

Team information
- Current team: Tondela
- Number: 17

Youth career
- San Jorge

Senior career*
| Years | Team | Apps | (Gls) |
| 2015–2022 | San Jorge | 36 | (10) |
| 2022 | Sportivo Las Parejas | 6 | (3) |
| 2022–2023 | Chaco For Ever | 38 | (2) |
| 2023 | → Patronato (loan) | 20 | (0) |
| 2025 | San Luis | 13 | (0) |
| 2025 | Provincial Ovalle | 9 | (2) |
| 2026 | Feirense | 10 | (0) |
| 2026– | Tondela | 4 | (0) |
- * Club domestic league appearances and goals as of 12 September 2026

Gastón Alejandro Novero (born 6 July 1998) is an Argentine footballer who plays as a winger for Liga Portugal 2 club Tondela.

== Career ==
Born in San Jorge, Argentina, Novero started his career with his hometown club, Club Atlético San Jorge, making his senior debut in 2016. As a member of them, he won three times the Copa Federación de Santa Fe in 2016, 2017 and 2018.

In February 2022, Novero signed with Sportivo Las Parejas. In May 2022, he switched to Chaco For Ever. He was loaned out to Patronato for the 2023 season and took part in the 2023 Copa Libertadores.

Ended his contract with Chaco For Ever, Novero moved abroad and signed with Chilean club San Luis de Quillota in 2025. On 1 August of the same year, Novero switched to Provincial Ovalle.

In 2026, Novero moved to Europe and joined Portuguese club Feirense.
