= Facundo Sava =

Argentine footballer and manager

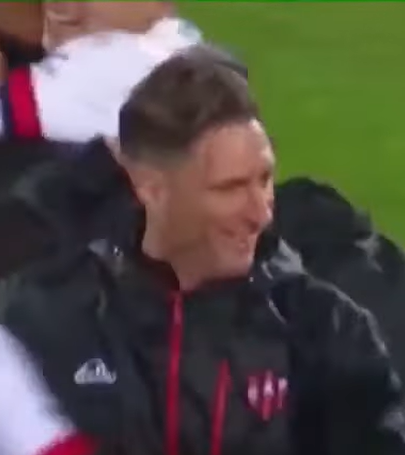
- Sava in 2022

Personal information
- Full name: Facundo Sava
- Date of birth: 7 March 1974 (age 52)
- Place of birth: Ituzaingó, Argentina
- Height: 1.89 m (6 ft 2 1/2 in)
- Position: Centre forward

Team information
- Current team: Sarmiento (manager)

Senior career*
Years	Team	Apps	(Gls)
1993–1996	Ferro Carril Oeste	80	(9)
1996–1997	Boca Juniors	7	(0)
1997–2002	Gimnasia LP	182	(67)
2002–2006	Fulham	27	(6)
2004–2005	→ Celta (loan)	26	(3)
2005–2006	→ Lorca Deportiva (loan)	38	(7)
2006–2008	Racing Club	66	(29)
2008–2009	Arsenal de Sarandí	21	(3)
2009–2010	Quilmes	21	(4)
2010	Ferro Carril Oeste	6	(2)
Total		474	(130)

Managerial career
- 2012: San Martín SJ
- 2013: Unión de Santa Fe
- 2014–2015: O'Higgins
- 2015: Quilmes
- 2016: Racing Club
- 2017: Tigre
- 2018: Gimnasia LP
- 2019–2021: Quilmes
- 2022: Patronato
- 2023: Cerro Porteño
- 2023: Sarmiento
- 2024: Huracán
- 2024–2025: Atlético Tucumán
- 2025–: Sarmiento
- * Club domestic league appearances and goals

Facundo Sava (born 7 March 1974) is an Argentine football manager and former player who played as a centre forward. He is the current manager of Sarmiento.

Sava played 17 years of professional football, mainly representing Gimnasia and Racing Club in the Argentine Primera División. Abroad, he had brief spells at Fulham in the Premier League, and Celta Vigo and Lorca Deportiva in Spain's Segunda División in the early 2000s.

In 2012, Sava began managing, leading several clubs in his country's top flight including Racing and Gimnasia, as well as O'Higgins in the Chilean Primera División and Cerro Porteño in Paraguay. He won the Copa Argentina with Patronato in 2022.

== Playing career ==
=== Early years and Fulham ===
Sava started his career at Ferro Carril Oeste in 1993. In 1996, he moved to Boca Juniors. A year later, he was sold on to Gimnasia y Esgrima La Plata. In 2002, Sava was sold to Fulham on a four-year deal for £2 million, having helped his team come second to Club Atlético River Plate. He was the one signing made by Franco Baresi as sporting director, while manager Jean Tigana was on holiday.

Sava made his debut on 6 July in the UEFA Intertoto Cup first round away to FC Haka in Finland, playing 60 minutes before being substituted for Barry Hayles. His Premier League debut was on 17 August as the season began with a 4–1 home win over Bolton Wanderers; he came on for Louis Saha with 12 minutes remaining. In the next game a week later, again from the bench, he equalised in the last minute in a 2–2 draw at Middlesbrough.

On 23 November 2002, Sava scored once in each half of a 3–2 win over Liverpool at Craven Cottage. Three days later, he failed to clear for the first goal and scored an own goal for the second, as Fulham lost 2–1 to Hertha BSC in the fourth round of the UEFA Cup; he was openly criticised by Tigana for his performance. During his time at Fulham, Sava celebrated goals by putting on a mask that he pulled from his sock; he explained that it came from his time at Gimnasia when fans threw masks onto the pitch.

Affected by injury, Sava played only six games in 2003–04, scoring once for Chris Coleman's team.

=== Spain ===
On 27 August 2004, Sava was loaned to RC Celta de Vigo, newly relegated to the Spanish Segunda División and who had lost star striker Savo Milošević. He made his debut on 4 September as a substitute in a 1–0 home win over Gimnàstic de Tarragona. Twenty-two days later, he played the full match and scored his first goal in his fifth game, to open a 1–1 draw at Real Murcia; he contributed three goals in 26 games, mainly as a substitute, as the team returned to La Liga as runners-up to Cádiz CF.

In 2005–06, Sava signed on loan for another team in Spain's second division, Unai Emery's Lorca Deportiva. He contributed seven goals in 38 games to help towards a fifth-place finish; this included two on 20 November in a 4–0 home win over Hércules CF.

=== Return to Argentina ===
Sava was one of six Fulham players released in May 2006. He then returned to his country's top flight, at Racing Club de Avellaneda.

In 2008, he joined Arsenal de Sarandí and, the following season, he helped Quilmes Atlético Club achieve promotion to the Argentine Primera División. However, he did not stay with Quilmes in the Primera, instead returning to his first club, Ferro Carril Oeste, after 14 years. With Ferro, he played 6 games in the 2010–11 season of the Primera B Nacional, before deciding to retire. He played his last game in an away draw against Club Atlético Belgrano on 11 September 2010.

== Coaching career ==
On 23 April 2012, Sava took his first coaching job as the head coach at San Martín de San Juan, having previously been the assistant. He made his debut five days later, in a 1–0 home top-flight win over Godoy Cruz Antonio Tomba. On 4 September, having lost all five games of the new season, he was sacked.

At the start of 2013, Sava succeeded Nery Pumpido at Unión de Santa Fe. He kept his job after relegation, but was dismissed in December as the team fell out of the Nacional B play-off positions.

In May 2014, Sava was appointed by Chilean Primera División club O'Higgins F.C. as the replacement for his compatriot, Eduardo Berizzo. The following January, he was dismissed after a defeat at C.D. Universidad de Concepción.

Sava was hired by his former team Quilmes in July 2015, moving in December to replace Diego Cocca at Racing Club for a 3 million Argentine peso fee. He made his debut on 4 February 2016 in his first continental game, a 2–2 draw at Puebla FC in Mexico for the Copa Libertadores qualifying round, eventually being eliminated 2–1 in the last 16 in May by Brazil's Clube Atlético Mineiro. Club president Víctor Blanco confirmed Sava as manager for the rest of the calendar year, but he left and was replaced by Ricardo Zielinski before the new season.

In March 2017, Sava was hired for two years at Club Atlético Tigre. On 3 June, he announced his resignation following a 3–0 home loss to Club Atlético Vélez Sarsfield. At the start of the new year, he returned to Gimnasia where he had left as a player 16 years earlier. He left on 21 April, after achieving two wins and three draws from 12 games.

Sava returned to Quilmes in December 2019. In 2021, the team reached the promotion play-off final, losing on penalties to Barracas Central after a goalless draw on 21 December.

In March 2022, Sava returned to the top flight, being hired by Club Atlético Patronato for the rest of the year. He guided the team to the Copa Argentina, winning 2–1 at Gimnasia in the last 16, on penalties against River Plate in the quarter-finals, and on the same method against Boca Juniors in the semi-finals, before defeating Talleres de Córdoba by a single goal in the final on 31 October. Days later, he announced that he would not renew his contract.

Sava moved to Paraguay as manager of Cerro Porteño on 12 February 2023, but was sacked on 9 July. On 27 October, he returned to his country's top flight on a 12-month deal replacing Pablo Lavallén at Club Atlético Sarmiento, but left on 28 November.

On 30 December 2023, Sava was appointed manager of Huracán, but resigned the following 18 February. On 3 March 2024, he took over fellow top-tier side Atlético Tucumán.

Sava resigned on 8 February 2025, and took over Sarmiento on 1 August.

== Managerial statistics ==
As of 1 February 2024

Managerial record by team and tenure
Team	From	To	Record					Ref.
Team	From	To	P	W	D	L	Win %	Ref.
San Martín SJ	23 April 2012	4 September 2012	14	4	3	7	28.57	
Unión de Santa Fe	1 January 2013	10 December 2013	40	9	18	13	22.50	
O'Higgins	1 July 2014	21 January 2015	20	7	5	8	35.00	
Quilmes	26 July 2015	31 December 2015	15	9	2	4	60.00	
Racing Club	1 January 2016	16 August 2016	28	10	11	7	35.71	
Tigre	27 March 2017	30 June 2017	14	4	1	9	28.57	
Gimnasia LP	5 January 2018	21 April 2018	12	2	3	7	16.67	
Quilmes	1 January 2020	31 December 2021	53	27	13	13	50.94	
Patronato	7 March 2022	31 December 2022	42	20	7	15	47.62	
Cerro Porteño	13 February 2013	10 July 2013	30	15	7	8	50.00	
Sarmiento	27 October 2023	28 November 2023	4	1	2	1	25.00	
Huracán	1 January 2024	Present	2	1	0	1	50.00	
Total			274	109	72	93	39.78	

== Honours ==
=== Player ===
Fulham

- UEFA Intertoto Cup: 2002

Arsenal de Sarandí

- Suruga Bank Championship: 2008

=== Manager ===
Patronato

- Copa Argentina: 2022
