= Cristian González (footballer, born 1990) =

Argentine footballer (born 1990)

Personal information
- Full name: Cristian Leandro González
- Date of birth: 13 January 1990 (age 36)
- Place of birth: Castelar, Argentina
- Height: 1.88 m (6 ft 2 in)
- Position: Centre back

Youth career
- Deportivo Morón

Senior career*
Years	Team	Apps	(Gls)
2010–2015	Deportivo Morón	134	(6)
2013–2014	→ Unión MdP (loan)	19	(1)
2015	All Boys	33	(2)
2016	Defensores de Belgrano	10	(0)
2016–2017	Atlético Venezuela	26	(1)
2017–2019	Villa Dálmine	22	(1)
2019–2021	Deportivo Madryn	27	(1)
2021	Atlético Rafaela	22	(3)
2022	Deportivo Madryn	23	(1)
2023	Patronato	30	(2)
2024	Comerciantes Unidos	13	(2)
2024	Chacarita Juniors	17	(0)
2025	Central Norte	27	(1)
2026	San Luis	6	(1)
- * Club domestic league appearances and goals as of 23 June 2026

Cristian Leandro González (born 13 January 1990) is an Argentine professional footballer who plays as a centre back.

== Career ==
Deportivo Morón were the first club of González's senior career. He made one hundred and thirty-five appearances across seven seasons in Primera B Metropolitana, as he also scored six goals - with his first on 15 February 2010 against Almirante Brown. Whilst with the club, González spent the 2013–14 campaign out on loan in Torneo Argentino A with Unión Mar del Plata. Two goals in twenty-one fixtures in all competitions followed. González featured twice in the 2015 season for Deportivo Morón, prior to departing on 18 February 2015 to All Boys. He scored in his second match against Boca Unidos on 5 April.

After two goals and thirty-five games for All Boys in Primera B Nacional, González returned to the third tier with Defensores de Belgrano on 31 January 2016. Six months later, in June, González moved to Venezuela to join Primera División side Atlético Venezuela. He featured twenty-two times in 2016, as he received two red cards in the process. Thirteen appearances came in 2017, along with his first goal for Atlético Venezuela versus Deportivo Lara on 1 April 2017. In the succeeding August, González joined Villa Dálmine in Primera B Nacional. His first match came in April 2018; during a loss to Aldosivi.

In January 2026, González moved to Chile and joined San Luis de Quillota. He was released on 23 June of the same year.

== Career statistics ==
As of 1 April 2019.

Appearances and goals by club, season and competition
Club	Season	League			Cup		Continental		Other		Total	
Club	Season	Division	Apps	Goals	Apps	Goals	Apps	Goals	Apps	Goals	Apps	Goals
Deportivo Morón	2012–13	Primera B Metropolitana	32	1	3	0	—		0	0	35	1
Deportivo Morón	2013–14	Primera B Metropolitana	0	0	0	0	—		0	0	0	0
Deportivo Morón	2014	Primera B Metropolitana	11	0	0	0	—		1 (Note: Appearance(s) in the Primera B Metropolitana play-offs)	0	12	0
Deportivo Morón	2015	Primera B Metropolitana	1	0	1	0	—		0	0	2	0
Deportivo Morón	Total		44	1	4	0	—		1	0	49	1
Unión Mar del Plata (loan)	2013–14	Torneo Argentino A	19	1	2	1	—		0	0	21	2
All Boys	2015	Primera B Nacional	33	2	2	0	—		0	0	35	2
Defensores de Belgrano	2016	Primera B Metropolitana	10	0	0	0	—		0	0	10	0
Atlético Venezuela	2016	Primera División	15	0	3	0	—		4 (Note: Appearance(s) in the Primera División play-offs)	0	22	0
Atlético Venezuela	2017	Primera División	11	1	0	0	2 (Note: Appearance(s) in the Copa Sudamericana)	0	0	0	13	1
Atlético Venezuela	Total		26	1	3	0	2	0	4	0	35	1
Villa Dálmine	2017–18	Primera B Nacional	6	0	0	0	—		0	0	6	0
Villa Dálmine	2018–19	Primera B Nacional	14	0	2	0	—		0	0	16	0
Villa Dálmine	Total		20	0	2	0	—		0	0	22	0
Career total			152	5	13	1	2	0	5	0	172	6
