= Lucas González (footballer, born 1997) =

Argentine footballer

Personal information
- Date of birth: 25 July 1997 (age 29)
- Place of birth: San Isidro de Lules, Argentina
- Height: 1.85 m (6 ft 1 in)
- Position: Forward

Team information
- Current team: Estudiantes Río Cuarto
- Number: 7

Youth career
- San Martín T.
- 2014–2017: Almirante Brown
- 2017–2019: San Martín T.

Senior career*
Years	Team	Apps	(Gls)
2019–2021	San Martín T.	40	(15)
2022	Defensores de Belgrano	15	(1)
2022–2023	Deportivo Madryn	42	(19)
2023–2024	Deportes Tolima	14	(1)
2024–2025	Aldosivi	13	(0)
2025–	Estudiantes Río Cuarto	43	(8)
- * Club domestic league appearances and goals as of 17:15, 11 May 2026 (UTC)

Lucas González (born 25 July 1997) is an Argentine professional footballer who plays as a forward for Estudiantes Río Cuarto.

== Career ==
González, after featuring in the club's youth set-up either side of a stint with Almirante Brown, started his senior career with San Martín of the Primera División. He made his bow in senior football in March 2019, coming off the substitutes bench in a Copa Argentina encounter with Primera B Nacional's Agropecuario on seventy-four minutes before going on to score nine minutes later in an eventual 2–2 draw; with San Martín advancing on penalties, despite González missing his spot-kick.

In January 2022, González moved to Defensores de Belgrano. Six months later, in June 2022, he signed for Deportivo Madryn.

== Career statistics ==
As of 7 March 2019.

Appearances and goals by club, season and competition
Club	Season	League			Cup		Continental		Other		Total	
Club	Season	Division	Apps	Goals	Apps	Goals	Apps	Goals	Apps	Goals	Apps	Goals
San Martín	2018–19	Primera División	0	0	1	1	—		0	0	1	1
Career total			0	0	1	1	—		0	0	1	1
