= Brian Nievas =

Argentine professional footballer

Personal information
- Full name: Brian Agustín Nievas
- Date of birth: 28 April 1998 (age 28)
- Place of birth: Diamante, Argentina
- Height: 1.80 m (5 ft 11 in)
- Position: Defensive midfielder

Team information
- Current team: Chaco For Ever (on loan from Patronato)

Youth career
- Club Diamantino
- Patronato

Senior career*
Years	Team	Apps	(Gls)
2019–	Patronato	31	(1)
2022	→ Macará (loan)	4	(0)
2023–2024	→ Chaco For Ever (loan)	37	(6)
2025–	→ Chaco For Ever (loan)	15	(0)
- * Club domestic league appearances and goals as of 18:00, 24 April 2026 (UTC)

Brian Agustín Nievas (born 28 April 1998) is an Argentine professional footballer who plays as a defensive midfielder for Chaco For Ever, on loan from Patronato.

== Career ==
Nievas joined Patronato's ranks from Club Diamantino at the age of seventeen. He made the breakthrough into first-team football in March 2019, featuring for the final thirteen minutes of a Copa Argentina round of sixty-four penalty shoot-out victory over Dock Sud on 13 March; having replaced Pablo Ledesma. Nievas was selected on the bench for a Primera División fixture with Defensa y Justicia on 17 March, though wouldn't come on during a 2–0 win. His next appearance didn't arrive until 29 November 2020, as the defensive midfielder played eighty-one minutes of an away defeat to Huracán in the Copa de la Liga Profesional.

In January 2022, Nievas joined Ecuadorian club C.S.D. Macará on a one-year loan deal. However, at the end of May 2022 it was confirmed, that Nievas would return from the loan spell before time.

== Career statistics ==
As of 1 December 2020.

Appearances and goals by club, season and competition
Club	Season	League			Cup		League Cup		Continental		Other		Total	
Club	Season	Division	Apps	Goals	Apps	Goals	Apps	Goals	Apps	Goals	Apps	Goals	Apps	Goals
Patronato	2018–19	Primera División	0	0	0	0	0	0	—		0	0	0	0
Patronato	2019–20	Primera División	0	0	0	0	0	0	—		0	0	0	0
Patronato	2020–21 (Note: Soccerway counts Copa de la Liga Profesional appearances as league appearances.)	Primera División	1	0	0	0	0	0	—		0	0	1	0
Career total			1	0	0	0	0	0	—		0	0	1	0
