= Leandro Benegas =

Argentine footballer

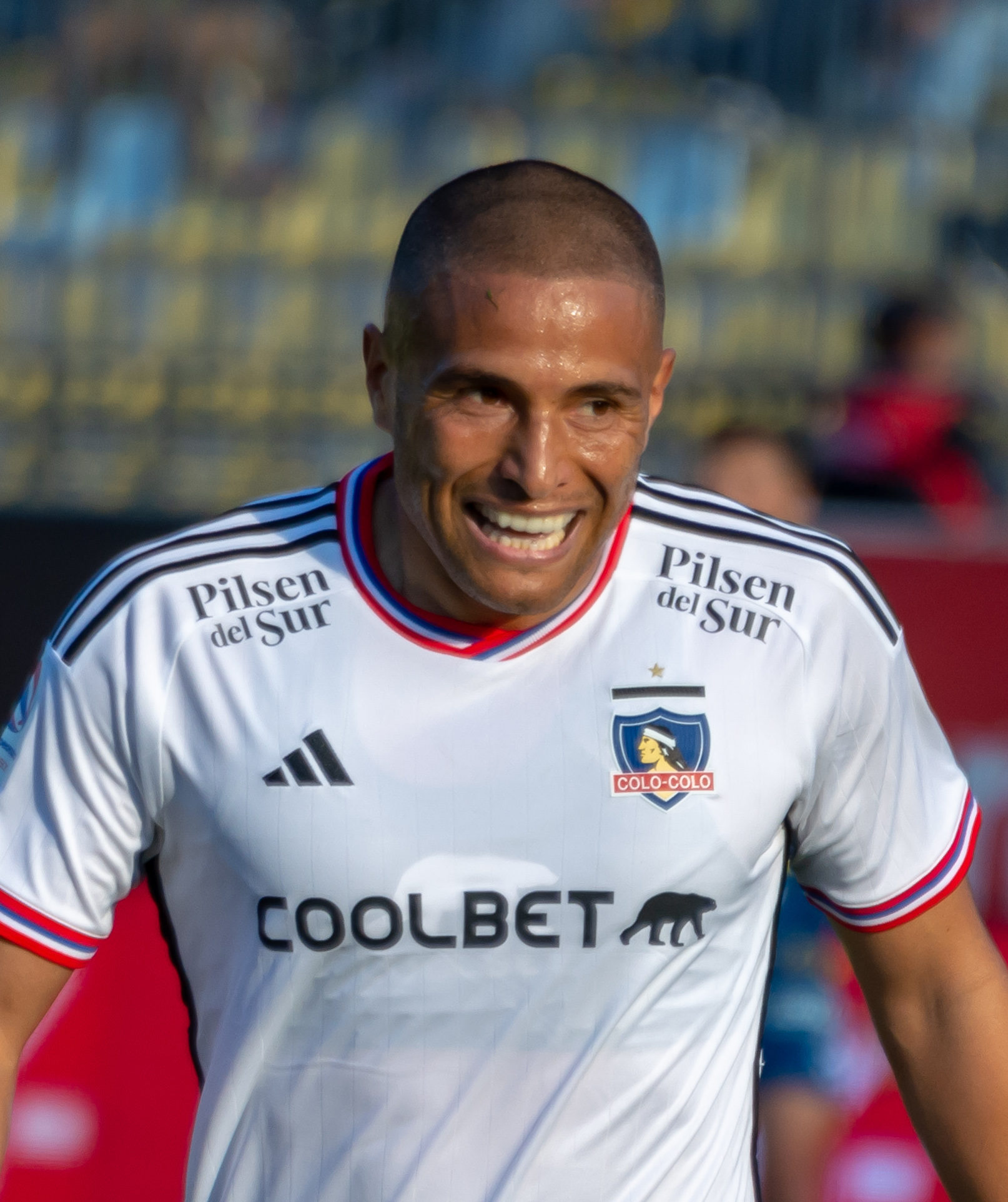
- Benegas with Colo-Colo in 2023

Personal information
- Full name: Leandro Iván Benegas
- Date of birth: 27 November 1988 (age 37)
- Place of birth: Mendoza, Argentina
- Height: 1.79 m (5 ft 10 in)
- Position: Forward

Youth career
- Independiente Rivadavia
- 2007–2008: River Plate

Senior career*
Years	Team	Apps	(Gls)
2006–2009	Independiente Rivadavia	42	(6)
2009–2010	Huracán	16	(1)
2010	C.A.I.	12	(1)
2011	Deportivo Armenio	9	(0)
2011–2012	Deportivo Laferrere	31	(13)
2012–2014	Unión La Calera	68	(30)
2015–2019	Universidad de Chile	65	(19)
2016	→ Audax Italiano (loan)	10	(2)
2016	→ Palestino (loan)	15	(10)
2020	Palestino	28	(5)
2021	Curicó Unido	24	(11)
2022	Independiente	32	(9)
2023–2024	Colo-Colo	29	(6)
2024	→ Unión Española (loan)	11	(6)
2025	O'Higgins	7	(1)
2025	Unión La Calera	15	(2)
2026	Curicó Unido	19	(10)
- * Club domestic league appearances and goals as of 13 November 2026

Leandro Iván Benegas (born 27 November 1988) is an Argentine naturalized Chilean professional footballer who plays as a forward.

== Club career ==
In the second half of 2024, Benegas was loaned out to Unión Española from Colo-Colo. Ended his contract with Colo-Colo, he signed with O'Higgins for the 2025 season. On 7 July 2025, he switched to Unión La Calera.

In January 2026, Benegas returned to Curicó Unido after his stint in 2021.

== International career ==
He received his first call up to the Chile senior team to play the 2022 FIFA World Cup qualification match against Colombia on 13 October 2020, replacing Juan Carlos Gaete due to injury, but he didn't make his international debut.

== Personal life ==
On 26 December 2018, Benegas received the Chilean nationality by residence.

== Honours ==
Universidad de Chile

- Primera División (1): 2017–C
- Copa Chile (1): 2015
- Supercopa (1): 2015
