= Agustín Bindella =

Argentine footballer (born 2001)

Personal information
- Full name: Agustín Fabián Bindella
- Date of birth: 5 March 2001 (age 25)
- Place of birth: Quilmes, Argentina
- Height: 1.71 m (5 ft 7 in)
- Position: Defender

Team information
- Current team: Quilmes

Youth career
- Quilmes

Senior career*
| Years | Team | Apps | (Gls) |
| 2018– | Quilmes | 91 | (2) |
| 2019 | → Independiente (loan) | 0 | (0) |
| 2024 | → Gimnasia Mendoza (loan) | 15 | (1) |
- * Club domestic league appearances and goals as of 17:30, 18 April 2026 (UTC)

Agustín Fabián Bindella (born 5 March 2001) is an Argentine professional footballer who plays as a defender for Quilmes.

== Career ==
Bindella started his senior career with Primera B Nacional's Quilmes. Marcelo Fuentes promoted Bindella into their first-team set-up for a fixture with Villa Dálmine in October 2018, with the defender featuring for thirty-four minutes of a 1–1 home draw. On 1 March 2019, Bindella completed a loan move to Primera División side Independiente; initially linking up with their reserves. He returned to Quilmes at the end of the year.

== Career statistics ==
As of 23 June 2020.

Appearances and goals by club, season and competition
| Club | Season | League | | | Cup | | Continental | | Other | | Total | |
| Club | Season | Division | Apps | Goals | Apps | Goals | Apps | Goals | Apps | Goals | Apps | Goals |
|---|---|---|---|---|---|---|---|---|---|---|---|---|
| Quilmes | 2018–19 | Primera B Nacional | 1 | 0 | 0 | 0 | — | | 0 | 0 | 1 | 0 |
| Quilmes | 2019–20 | Primera B Nacional | 0 | 0 | 0 | 0 | — | | 0 | 0 | 0 | 0 |
| Quilmes | Total | | 1 | 0 | 0 | 0 | 0 | 0 | 0 | 0 | 1 | 0 |
| Independiente (loan) | 2018–19 | Primera División | 0 | 0 | 0 | 0 | 0 | 0 | 0 | 0 | 0 | 0 |
| Independiente (loan) | 2019–20 | Primera División | 0 | 0 | 0 | 0 | 0 | 0 | 0 | 0 | 0 | 0 |
| Independiente (loan) | Total | | 0 | 0 | 0 | 0 | 0 | 0 | 0 | 0 | 0 | 0 |
| Career total | | | 1 | 0 | 0 | 0 | 0 | 0 | 0 | 0 | 1 | 0 |
