= Juan Guasone =

Argentine professional footballer

Personal information
- Full name: Juan Cruz Guasone
- Date of birth: 27 March 2001 (age 25)
- Place of birth: San Nicolás, Argentina
- Height: 1.95 m (6 ft 5 in)
- Position: Centre-back

Team information
- Current team: Cerro (on loan from Estudiantes)
- Number: 16

Youth career
- Lanús
- 2016–2017: Rosario Central
- 2018–2020: Patronato

Senior career*
Years	Team	Apps	(Gls)
2020–2023	Patronato	30	(0)
2023–	Estudiantes	8	(0)
2024	→ Sarmiento (loan)	9	(0)
2025	→ Salernitana (loan)	1	(0)
2026–	→ Cerro (loan)	5	(0)
- * Club domestic league appearances and goals as of 18:07, 13 March 2026 (UTC)

Juan Cruz Guasone (born 27 March 2001) is an Argentine professional footballer who plays as a centre-back for Cerro, on loan from Estudiantes de La Plata.

== Career ==
Guasone had two-year spells in the youth ranks of Lanús and Rosario Central before joining Patronato in 2018; following a trial in 2017. He was moved into the club's first-team squad in 2020–21, with the centre-back initially appearing as an unused substitute for Copa de la Liga Profesional matches with Huracán and Gimnasia y Esgrima in November. His senior debut soon arrived in that competition later that month, on 29 November, during a 1–0 defeat away to Huracán; he played the full ninety minutes, picking up a yellow card in the process.

In 2023, Guasone joined Estudiantes where he marked his first goal on his professional career in a Copa Argentina match which helped the team to win the match 3–1. The club won Copa Argentina 2023 and turned Guasone in a two-time champion player because Patronato won Copa Argentina 2022.

During 2024 he went on a one-year loan in Sarmiento de Junín.

On 14 January 2025, Guasone joined Salernitana in Italy on a six months loan with an option to buy.

On 30 June 2025, his loan expired and Guasone returned to Estudiantes.

After his return to Estudiantes de La Plata, Guasone arrived at Cerro, on loan until December 2026.

== Career statistics ==
As of 30 November 2020.

Appearances and goals by club, season and competition
Club	Season	League			Cup		League Cup		Continental		Other		Total	
Club	Season	Division	Apps	Goals	Apps	Goals	Apps	Goals	Apps	Goals	Apps	Goals	Apps	Goals
Patronato	2020–21 (Note: Soccerway counts Copa de la Liga Profesional appearances as league appearances.)	Primera División	1	0	0	0	0	0	—		0	0	1	0
Career total			1	0	0	0	0	0	—		0	0	1	0
