= Tomás Pozzo =

Argentine professional footballer

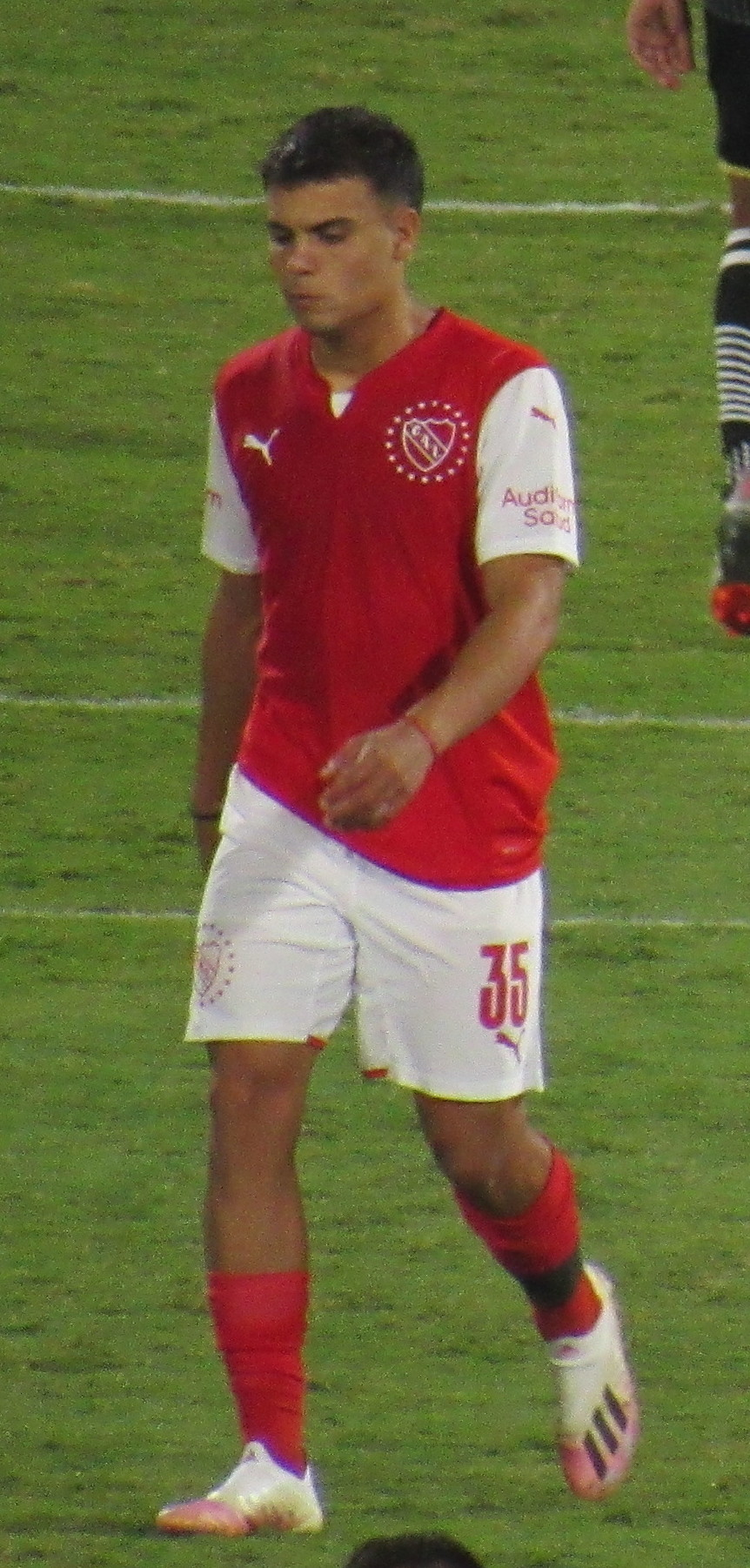

Personal information
- Full name: Tomás Agustín Pozzo
- Date of birth: 27 September 2000 (age 26)
- Place of birth: Adrogué, Buenos Aires, Argentina
- Position: Midfielder

Team information
- Current team: Godoy Cruz

Youth career
- CA Calzada
- 2008–2014: Banfield
- Independiente

Senior career*
Years	Team	Apps	(Gls)
2020–2024	Independiente	52	(3)
2024–	Godoy Cruz	23	(1)
- * Club domestic league appearances and goals as of 19:04, 18 March 2026 (UTC)

Tomás Agustín Pozzo (born 27 September 2000) is an Argentine professional footballer who plays as a midfielder for Godoy Cruz.

== Career ==
Pozzo started his youth career with Club Atlético Calzada, before signing for Banfield at the age of eight - remaining for six years. After leaving them, Pozzo joined Independiente's system. He was promoted into their first-team in November 2020 under manager Lucas Pusineri; having signed his first professional contract in the preceding January. Pozzo's senior debut arrived on 21 November in a goalless draw against Central Córdoba in the Copa de la Liga Profesional, as he replaced Andrés Roa with twelve minutes remaining.

== Personal life ==
Born and raised in Argentina, Pozzo is of Italian descent.

== Career statistics ==
As of 22 November 2020.

Appearances and goals by club, season and competition
Club	Season	League			Cup		League Cup		Continental		Other		Total	
Club	Season	Division	Apps	Goals	Apps	Goals	Apps	Goals	Apps	Goals	Apps	Goals	Apps	Goals
Independiente	2020–21 (Note: Soccerway counts Copa de la Liga Profesional appearances as league appearances.)	Primera División	1	0	0	0	0	0	0	0	0	0	1	0
Career total			1	0	0	0	0	0	0	0	0	0	1	0
