= Franco Leys =

Argentine footballer

Personal information
- Full name: Franco Ezequiel Leys
- Date of birth: 18 October 1993 (age 33)
- Place of birth: San Lorenzo, Argentina
- Height: 1.73 m (5 ft 8 in)
- Position: Midfielder

Team information
- Current team: Deportivo Pasto
- Number: 25

Youth career
- Villa Felisa

Senior career*
Years	Team	Apps	(Gls)
2013–2017	Colón	16	(0)
2017–2018	Juventud Unida	24	(0)
2018–2020	Sarmiento	23	(0)
2020–2021	Temperley	6	(0)
2021–2023	Patronato	61	(1)
2023–2026	América de Cali	73	(1)
2026	Aldosivi	11	(0)
2026–	Deportivo Pasto	6	(0)
- * Club domestic league appearances and goals as of 17:27, 3 October 2026 (UTC)

Franco Ezequiel Leys (born 18 October 1993) is an Argentine professional footballer who plays as a midfielder for Colombian club Deportivo Pasto.

== Career ==
Leys started out in the youth of local club Villa Felisa, prior to moving in 2013 to join Argentine Primera División side Colón. He made his professional debut on 2 November 2013 against Newell's Old Boys. During his first four campaigns with Colón, Leys made sixteen appearances. Leys joined Juventud Unida of Primera B Nacional in August 2017. His first appearance for Juventud came versus Flandria in the league on 17 September. Sarmiento completed the signing of Leys in June 2018. He made thirty total appearances in 2018–19, though played just once (in the Copa Argentina) in the subsequent campaign due to a serious injury.

In July 2020, Leys agreed a move to Temperley. On 4 February 2021, Leys joined Argentine Primera División club Patronato on a deal until the end of 2022.

== Career statistics ==
As of 29 August 2020.

Club statistics
Club	Season	League			Cup		League Cup		Continental		Other		Total	
Club	Season	Division	Apps	Goals	Apps	Goals	Apps	Goals	Apps	Goals	Apps	Goals	Apps	Goals
Colón	2013–14	Primera División	2	0	0	0	—		—		0	0	2	0
Colón	2014	Primera B Nacional	7	0	0	0	—		—		0	0	7	0
Colón	2015	Primera División	5	0	0	0	—		—		0	0	5	0
Colón	2016	Primera División	2	0	0	0	—		—		0	0	2	0
Colón	2016–17	Primera División	0	0	0	0	—		—		0	0	0	0
Colón	Total		16	0	0	0	—		—		0	0	16	0
Juventud Unida	2017–18	Primera B Nacional	24	0	1	0	—		—		0	0	25	0
Sarmiento	2018–19	Primera B Nacional	23	0	0	0	—		—		7 (Note: Appearance(s) in the Primera B Nacional)	0	30	0
Sarmiento	2019–20	Primera B Nacional	0	0	1	0	—		—		0	0	1	0
Sarmiento	Total		23	0	1	0	—		—		7	0	31	0
Temperley	2020–21	Primera B Nacional	0	0	0	0	—		—		0	0	0	0
Career total			63	0	2	0	—		—		7	0	72	0

== Honours ==
Patronato

- Copa Argentina: 2021–22
