= Jonás Acevedo =

Argentine footballer (born 1997)

Personal information
- Full name: Héctor Jonás Acevedo
- Date of birth: 6 February 1997 (age 29)
- Place of birth: Concarán, Argentina
- Height: 1.72 m (5 ft 8 in)
- Positions: Winger; midfielder

Team information
- Current team: Instituto
- Number: 8

Youth career
- Atlético de Concarán
- Sportivo Municipal
- San Lorenzo

Senior career*
Years	Team	Apps	(Gls)
2017–2021	San Lorenzo	2	(0)
2019–2020	→ Santamarina (loan)	14	(0)
2020–2021	→ Quilmes (loan)	17	(4)
2021–2025	Huracán	43	(2)
2022	→ Patronato (loan)	24	(5)
2023–2024	→ Instituto (loan)	43	(3)
2025–	Instituto	30	(1)
- * Club domestic league appearances and goals as of 18:04, 10 May 2026 (UTC)

Héctor Jonás Acevedo (born 6 February 1997) is an Argentine professional footballer who plays as a winger or midfielder for Instituto.

== Career ==
After youth spells with Atlético de Concarán, Sportivo Municipal and San Lorenzo, Acevedo began his senior career with San Lorenzo of the Argentine Primera División in 2018. He was selected on the substitutes bench for a fixture with Arsenal de Sarandí, in what was Diego Aguirre's final league game in charge of the club; Acevedo didn't feature. His professional debut arrived two months later under Claudio Biaggio, with the midfielder coming off the bench for the final sixteen minutes of a win over San Martín on 18 November. One further appearance followed against Atlético Tucumán in November, as San Lorenzo placed third.

In August 2019, Acevedo was loaned to Santamarina of Primera B Nacional. Fourteen appearances followed. In August 2020, Acevedo moved across the second tier to join Quilmes on loan.

On 29 June 2021, Acevedo was sold to Huracán. In July 2022, he joined fellow league club Patronato on loan for the rest of the year.

== Career statistics ==
As of 7 September 2020.

Club statistics
Club	Season	League			Cup		League Cup		Continental		Other		Total	
Club	Season	Division	Apps	Goals	Apps	Goals	Apps	Goals	Apps	Goals	Apps	Goals	Apps	Goals
San Lorenzo	2017–18	Primera División	2	0	0	0	—		0	0	0	0	2	0
San Lorenzo	2018–19	Primera División	0	0	0	0	0	0	0	0	0	0	0	0
San Lorenzo	2019–20	Primera División	0	0	0	0	0	0	—		0	0	0	0
San Lorenzo	2020–21	Primera División	0	0	0	0	0	0	—		0	0	0	0
San Lorenzo	Total		2	0	0	0	0	0	0	0	0	0	2	0
Santamarina (loan)	2019–20	Primera B Nacional	14	0	0	0	—		—		0	0	14	0
Quilmes (loan)	2020–21	Primera B Nacional	0	0	0	0	—		—		0	0	0	0
Career total			16	0	0	0	0	0	0	0	0	0	16	0

== Honours ==
Patronato

- Copa Argentina: 2022
