= Tiago Banega =

Argentine footballer

Personal information
- Full name: Tiago Nahuel Banega
- Date of birth: 1 July 1999 (age 27)
- Place of birth: Concepción del Uruguay, Argentina
- Height: 1.78 m (5 ft 10 in)
- Position: Midfielder

Team information
- Current team: Gimnasia y Tiro

Youth career
- DEPRO

Senior career*
Years	Team	Apps	(Gls)
2015–2017	DEPRO	6	(0)
2017–2025	Racing Club	11	(2)
2021–2022	→ Patronato (loan)	28	(0)
2023	→ Arsenal de Sarandí (loan)	15	(1)
2023–2024	→ Unión de Santa Fe (loan)	14	(0)
2025–2026	Central Norte	27	(0)
2026–	Gimnasia y Tiro	8	(0)
- * Club domestic league appearances and goals as of 18:05, 28 April 2026 (UTC)

Tiago Nahuel Banega (born 1 July 1999) is an Argentine professional footballer who plays as a midfielder for Gimnasia y Tiro.

== Professional career ==
A youth product of Depro, Banega debuted with their senior team at the age of 15 before transferring to Racing Club in 2017.

=== Racing ===
Banega made his professional debut with Racing Club in a 1-1 Argentine Primera División tie with Atlético Tucumán on 26 January 2020. On 5 February 2020, Banega signed his first professional contract with Racing Club.

==== Loan to Patronato ====
On 30 June 2021, Banega joined fellow league club Patronato on a loan deal until the end of 2022. On October 30, 2022, Banega scored the only goal of the 2022 Copa Argentina final for Patronato.
