= Facundo Altamirano =

Argentine footballer

Personal information
- Full name: Facundo Altamirano
- Date of birth: 21 March 1996 (age 30)
- Place of birth: Rojas, Argentina
- Height: 1.85 m (6 ft 1 in)
- Position: Goalkeeper

Team information
- Current team: San Lorenzo
- Number: 20

Youth career
- 1999–2015: Banfield

Senior career*
Years	Team	Apps	(Gls)
2015–2024	Banfield	33	(0)
2019	→ Estudiantes BA (loan)	13	(0)
2022	→ Patronato (loan)	26	(0)
2023	→ San Lorenzo (loan)	5	(0)
2024–	San Lorenzo	23	(0)
- * Club domestic league appearances and goals as of 17:37, 20 December 2025 (UTC)

Facundo Altamirano (born 21 March 1996) is an Argentine professional footballer who plays as a goalkeeper for Argentine Primera División side San Lorenzo.

== Career ==
Altamirano started with Argentine Primera División side Banfield. He first appeared on a Banfield first-team teamsheet in May 2015, being an unused substitute for games against Independiente and Aldosivi. On 10 September 2017, Altamirano made his professional debut in a 3–1 league defeat to River Plate.

== Career statistics ==
As of 9 May 2024.

Club statistics
Club	Division	League			Cup		Continental		Total	
Club	Division	Season	Apps	Goals	Apps	Goals	Apps	Goals	Apps	Goals
Banfield	Primera División	2017-18	14	0	1	0	—		15	0
Banfield	Primera División	2018-19	—		—		—		0	0
Banfield	Primera División	2019-20	—		—		—		0	0
Banfield	Primera División	2020-21	—		3	0	—		3	0
Banfield	Primera División	2021	17	0	1	0	—		18	0
Banfield	Total		31	0	5	0	0	0	36	0
Estudiantes BA	Primera B Nacional	2019-20	13	0	4	0	—		17	0
Patronato	Primera División	2022	25	0	6	0	—		31	0
San Lorenzo	Primera División	2023	5	0	—		—		5	0
San Lorenzo	Primera División	2024	12	0	1	0	4	0	17	0
San Lorenzo	Total		17	0	1	0	4	0	22	0
Career total			86	0	16	0	4	0	106	0

== Honours ==
Patronato

- Copa Argentina: 2022

Individual

- Copa Argentina Best Player: 2022
