= Francisco Álvarez (footballer, born 2000) =

Argentine footballer

Personal information
- Full name: Francisco Álvarez
- Date of birth: 26 February 2000 (age 26)
- Place of birth: San Juan, Argentina
- Height: 1.80 m (5 ft 11 in)
- Position: Centre-back

Team information
- Current team: Argentinos Juniors
- Number: 16

Youth career
- 2013–2017: San Martín SJ

Senior career*
Years	Team	Apps	(Gls)
2017–2022	San Martín SJ	46	(0)
2022–2024	Talleres	5	(1)
2022	→ Patronato (loan)	14	(1)
2023	→ Barracas Central (loan)	40	(5)
2024–	Argentinos Juniors	85	(4)
- * Club domestic league appearances and goals as of 17:22, 10 July 2026 (UTC)

Francisco Álvarez (born 26 February 2000) is an Argentine professional footballer who plays as a centre-back for Argentinos Juniors.

== Career ==
=== Club ===
Álvarez's career began with San Martín in 2013, initially featuring for their youth squads. He first made a teamsheet for the first-team in June 2017, when he was an unused substitute for a Copa Argentina defeat to Atlanta. As he was for an Argentine Primera División match with Tigre on 5 February 2018, which preceded his professional debut on 12 February during a league loss away to Atlético Tucumán.

In January 2022, Álvarez joined Argentine Primera División club Talleres de Córdoba on a deal until the end of 2026. On 5 June 2022, to get some more playing time, Álvarez joined fellow league club Patronato on loan for one year.

=== International ===
Álvarez was selected to train with the Argentina U20s in 2018, including against the senior team in March.

== Career statistics ==
As of 28 October 2018.

Club statistics
Club	Season	League			Cup (Note: Includes the Copa Argentina)		League Cup		Continental (Note: Includes the Copa Libertadores and Copa Sudamericana)		Other		Total	
Club	Season	Division	Apps	Goals	Apps	Goals	Apps	Goals	Apps	Goals	Apps	Goals	Apps	Goals
San Martín	2017–18	Primera División	1	0	0	0	—		—		0	0	1	0
San Martín	2018–19	Primera División	1	0	0	0	—		—		0	0	1	0
Career total			2	0	0	0	—		—		0	0	2	0
