= Axel Rodríguez =

Argentine footballer

Personal information
- Full name: Axel Alan Rodríguez
- Date of birth: 25 March 1997 (age 29)
- Place of birth: Bahía Blanca, Argentina
- Height: 1.79 m (5 ft 10 in)
- Position: Forward

Team information
- Current team: Godoy Cruz (on loan from Olimpo)

Youth career
- Libertad de Bahía Blanca
- Olimpo

Senior career*
Years	Team	Apps	(Gls)
2015–	Olimpo	54	(15)
2021	→ All Boys (loan)	24	(11)
2022	→ Patronato (loan)	27	(5)
2023	→ Instituto (loan)	17	(1)
2024	→ Atlético Tucumán (loan)	4	(0)
2024	→ Colón (loan)	15	(3)
2025	→ Almagro (loan)	27	(5)
2026–	→ Godoy Cruz (loan)	1	(0)
- * Club domestic league appearances and goals as of 21:46, 12 March 2026 (UTC)

Axel Alan Rodríguez (born 25 March 1997) is an Argentine professional footballer who plays as a forward for Primera Nacional club Godoy Cruz, on loan from Olimpo.

== Career ==
Rodríguez, who had a youth spell with Libertad de Bahía Blanca, was promoted into the senior squad of Olimpo in 2015, making appearances against Arsenal de Sarandí and Godoy Cruz as the club placed eighteenth. He didn't feature for the first-team for another three seasons, with Mario Sciacqua recalling him up for a 2017–18 fixture with Gimnasia y Esgrima. He made five total appearances that campaign, two of which were starts as they were relegated. Rodríguez subsequently scored five times in his opening ten matches in Primera B Nacional, netting four of the five in consecutive home matches; equalling a 2008 record set by Josemir Lujambio.

After a loan spell at All Boys in 2021, Rodríguez joined Patronato at the end of January 2022 on a loan deal until the end of the year with a purchase option.

== Career statistics ==
As of 5 March 2019.

Appearances and goals by club, season and competition
Club	Season	League			Cup		Continental		Other		Total	
Club	Season	Division	Apps	Goals	Apps	Goals	Apps	Goals	Apps	Goals	Apps	Goals
Olimpo	2015	Primera División	2	0	0	0	—		0	0	2	0
Olimpo	2016	Primera División	0	0	0	0	—		0	0	0	0
Olimpo	2016–17	Primera División	0	0	0	0	—		0	0	0	0
Olimpo	2017–18	Primera División	5	0	0	0	—		0	0	5	0
Olimpo	2018–19	Primera B Nacional	17	5	2	0	—		0	0	19	5
Career total			24	5	2	0	—		0	0	26	5
