= Lautaro Geminiani =

Argentine footballer

Personal information
- Full name: Lautaro Dante Geminiani
- Date of birth: 2 March 1991 (age 35)
- Place of birth: Paraná, Argentina
- Height: 1.79 m (5 ft 10 in)
- Position: Right-back

Team information
- Current team: Zamora
- Number: 15

Youth career
- Patronato
- Boca Juniors
- Quilmes

Senior career*
| Years | Team | Apps | (Gls) |
| 2012–2019 | Patronato | 117 | (0) |
| 2019–2020 | Sarmiento | 7 | (0) |
| 2020–2024 | Patronato | 27 | (0) |
| 2024– | Zamora | 11 | (0) |
- * Club domestic league appearances and goals as of 18:27, 15 April 2022 (UTC)

Lautaro Dante Geminiani (born 2 March 1991) is an Argentine professional footballer who plays as a right-back for Zamora.

== Career ==
Geminiani began in the youth of Patronato, before spells with Boca Juniors and Quilmes. His career with Patronato's senior squad started in 2012. He made his professional debut on 7 December during a victory away to Independiente Rivadavia, one of two appearances in the 2012–13 Primera B Nacional campaign. He made sixty-eight appearances in his first four seasons with Patronato, which ended with promotion to the Argentine Primera División in 2015. Geminiani was sent off in his second Primera División match, on 14 February 2016 versus Gimnasia y Esgrima. Geminiani switched Patronato for Sarmiento in August 2019.

On 14 August 2020, following eight appearances for Verde, Geminiani completed a return to Patronato for a third spell with them.

== Career statistics ==
As of 25 September 2020

Appearances and goals by club, season and competition
| Club | Season | League | | | National cup | | League cup | | Continental | | Other | | Total | |
| Club | Season | Division | Apps | Goals | Apps | Goals | Apps | Goals | Apps | Goals | Apps | Goals | Apps | Goals |
|---|---|---|---|---|---|---|---|---|---|---|---|---|---|---|
| Patronato | 2012–13 | Primera B Nacional | 2 | 0 | 0 | 0 | — | | — | | 0 | 0 | 2 | 0 |
| Patronato | 2013–14 | Primera B Nacional | 17 | 0 | 1 | 0 | — | | — | | 0 | 0 | 18 | 0 |
| Patronato | 2014 | Primera B Nacional | 4 | 0 | 0 | 0 | — | | — | | 0 | 0 | 4 | 0 |
| Patronato | 2015 | Primera B Nacional | 39 | 0 | 1 | 0 | — | | — | | 4 (Note: Appearance(s) in the Primera B Nacional play-offs) | 0 | 44 | 0 |
| Patronato | 2016 | Argentine Primera División | 8 | 0 | 0 | 0 | — | | — | | 0 | 0 | 8 | 0 |
| Patronato | 2016–17 | Argentine Primera División | 26 | 0 | 2 | 0 | — | | — | | 0 | 0 | 28 | 0 |
| Patronato | 2017–18 | Argentine Primera División | 5 | 0 | 0 | 0 | — | | — | | 0 | 0 | 5 | 0 |
| Patronato | 2018–19 | Argentine Primera División | 16 | 0 | 0 | 0 | 2 | 0 | — | | 0 | 0 | 18 | 0 |
| Patronato | Total | | 117 | 0 | 4 | 0 | 2 | 0 | — | | 4 | 0 | 127 | 0 |
| Sarmiento | 2019–20 | Primera B Nacional | 7 | 0 | 1 | 0 | — | | — | | 0 | 0 | 8 | 0 |
| Patronato | 2020–21 | Argentine Primera División | 0 | 0 | 0 | 0 | 0 | 0 | — | | 0 | 0 | 0 | 0 |
| Career total | | | 124 | 0 | 5 | 0 | 2 | 0 | — | | 4 | 0 | 135 | 0 |
