= Raúl Lozano (footballer) =

Argentine footballer (born 1997)

Personal information
- Full name: Raúl Alberto Lozano
- Date of birth: 2 September 1997 (age 29)
- Place of birth: Solano, Argentina
- Height: 1.79 m (5 ft 10 in)
- Position: Right-back

Team information
- Current team: Estudiantes RC (on loan from Quilmes)
- Number: 45

Youth career
- Quilmes

Senior career*
Years	Team	Apps	(Gls)
2017–	Quilmes	47	(0)
2020–2021	→ Huracán (loan)	32	(0)
2022	→ Patronato (loan)	38	(1)
2023–2025	→ Platense (loan)	31	(0)
2026–	→ Estudiantes RC (loan)	11	(0)
- * Club domestic league appearances and goals as of 17:37, 8 November 2026 (UTC)

Raúl Alberto Lozano (born 2 September 1997) is an Argentine professional footballer who plays as a right-back for Estudiantes RC, on loan from Quilmes.

== Career ==
Lozano started his career with Quilmes. He was picked for his senior debut in May 2017 against Gimnasia y Esgrima in the Copa Argentina, with the defender playing the full duration of a penalty shoot-out defeat. In the succeeding June, Lozano was an unused substitute on two occasions in the Primera División but never made it on as Quilmes suffered relegation in 2016–17. His professional bow eventually arrived in the 2018–19 Primera B Nacional on 27 August 2018 versus Atlético de Rafaela, as Lozano started and finished the opening seventeen matches of Quilmes' season; only missing game eighteen due to suspension.

In July 2020, Lozano joined Huracán on loan for the rest of the year, with an option to extend the loan with one year, if Lozano had played 50% of the games for Huracán. In January 2021, the deal was extended for one year, until the end of 2021. In January 2022, Lozano was loaned out to fellow league club Patronato until the end of 2022 with a purchase option.

== Career statistics ==
As of 17 March 2019.

Appearances and goals by club, season and competition
Club	Season	League			Cup		Continental		Other		Total	
Club	Season	Division	Apps	Goals	Apps	Goals	Apps	Goals	Apps	Goals	Apps	Goals
Quilmes	2016–17	Primera División	0	0	1	0	—		0	0	1	0
Quilmes	2017–18	Primera B Nacional	0	0	0	0	—		0	0	0	0
Quilmes	2018–19	Primera B Nacional	17	0	0	0	—		0	0	17	0
Career total			17	0	1	0	—		0	0	18	0

== Honours ==
Platense

- Argentine Primera División: 2025 Apertura
