= Gastón Martínez (footballer, born 1991) =

Argentine footballer (born 1991)

Personal information
- Full name: Mauro Gastón Martínez
- Date of birth: 27 February 1991 (age 35)
- Place of birth: Resistencia, Argentina
- Height: 1.89 m (6 ft 2 in)
- Position: Centre-back

Team information
- Current team: Real España, Honduras

Youth career
- Talleres

Senior career*
Years	Team	Apps	(Gls)
2009–2011	Évian	25	(0)
2012–2014	Sportivo Belgrano	17	(0)
2013–2014	→ Jorge Ross (loan)	15	(0)
2015	Deportivo Roca	24	(0)
2016–2018	Alvarado	54	(2)
2018	Chacarita Juniors	3	(0)
2019–2020	Villa Dálmine	28	(1)
2020–2021	Estudiantes BA	20	(0)
2022–	Chaco For Ever	3	(0 2025)
- * Club domestic league appearances and goals as of 17:59, 17 July 2022 (UTC)

Mauro Gastón Martínez (born 27 February 1991) is an Argentine professional footballer who plays as a centre-back for Chaco For Ever.

== Career ==
Martínez played for Talleres' academy. Between 2009 and 2011, Martínez made fifteen appearances for Évian. He returned to Argentina with Sportivo Belgrano in 2012, making his debut in a Torneo Federal A loss to San Martín in September. Martínez was loaned to Torneo Argentino B's Jorge Ross in 2013. On 8 March 2015, Martínez signed for Deportivo Roca. His first appearance arrived two weeks after versus Cipolletti, which was one of twenty-five matches that campaign. January 2016 saw Martínez complete a move to Alvarado. He scored his first career goals in September against Rivadavia and Ferro Carril Oeste.

In June 2018, Martínez joined Primera B Nacional side Chacarita Juniors. He subsequently made his bow against Almagro on 27 August. On 5 January 2019, having terminated his contract with Chacarita, Martínez was signed by Villa Dálmine. One goal in twenty-eight appearances followed. In July 2020, Martínez penned terms with Estudiantes. In January 2022, Martínez moved to Chaco For Ever.

== Career statistics ==
As of 30 August 2020.

Club statistics
Club	Season	League			Cup		Continental		Other		Total	
Club	Season	Division	Apps	Goals	Apps	Goals	Apps	Goals	Apps	Goals	Apps	Goals
Sportivo Belgrano	2012–13	Torneo Argentino A	1	0	0	0	—		0	0	1	0
Jorge Ross (loan)	2013–14	Torneo Argentino B	15	0	0	0	—		0	0	15	0
Deportivo Roca	2015	Torneo Federal A	24	0	0	0	—		1 (Note: Appearance(s) in the Torneo Federal A play-offs)	0	25	0
Alvarado	2016	Torneo Federal A	9	0	0	0	—		4	0	13	0
Alvarado	2016–17	Torneo Federal A	25	2	1	0	—		0	0	26	2
Alvarado	2017–18	Torneo Federal A	20	0	3	0	—		6	0	29	0
Alvarado	Total		54	2	4	0	—		11	0	68	2
Chacarita Juniors	2018–19	Primera B Nacional	3	0	0	0	—		0	0	3	0
Villa Dálmine	2018–19	Primera B Nacional	10	1	0	0	—		0	0	10	1
Villa Dálmine	2019–20	Primera B Nacional	18	0	0	0	—		0	0	18	0
Villa Dálmine	Total		28	1	0	0	—		0	0	28	1
Estudiantes	2020–21	Primera B Nacional	0	0	0	0	—		0	0	0	0
Career total			125	3	4	0	—		11	0	140	3
