= Facundo Cobos =

Argentinian footballer (born 1993)

Personal information
- Full name: Facundo Cobos
- Date of birth: 19 February 1993 (age 33)
- Place of birth: Dorrego, Argentina
- Height: 1.78 m (5 ft 10 in)
- Position: Left-back

Team information
- Current team: Estudiantes RC
- Number: 28

Youth career
- All Boys
- Boca Juniors
- Independiente Rivadavia

Senior career*
Years	Team	Apps	(Gls)
2014–2016	Gutiérrez	43	(2)
2016–2019	Godoy Cruz	22	(1)
2019–2021	Sol de América	50	(1)
2021–2024	Patronato	75	(3)
2024–2025	Academia Puerto Cabello	28	(0)
2025–	Estudiantes RC	49	(1)
- * Club domestic league appearances and goals as of 17:36, 8 November 2026 (UTC)

Facundo Cobos (born 19 February 1993) is an Argentine professional footballer who plays as a left-back for Primera Nacional side Estudiantes RC.

== Career ==
Cobos had a youth spell with Boca Juniors, playing once for them at the 2012 U-20 Copa Libertadores. He also had time with All Boys and Independiente Rivadavia. His senior career began with Gutiérrez of Torneo Federal B in 2014. He made fifteen appearances in season one, before featuring twenty-nine times and scoring twice in 2015 which was spent in Torneo Federal A following promotion in 2014. In January 2016, Cobos joined Argentine Primera División side Godoy Cruz. His debut came on 23 April during a 1–0 win vs. San Martín. In October 2017, Cobos scored his first professional goal in a home win over Gimnasia y Esgrima.

Patronato

== Career statistics ==
As of 10 May 2018.

Club statistics
Club	Season	League			Cup (Note: Includes the Copa Argentina)		League Cup		Continental (Note: Includes the Copa Libertadores)		Other (Note: Includes the Torneo Federal A play-offs)		Total	
Club	Season	Division	Apps	Goals	Apps	Goals	Apps	Goals	Apps	Goals	Apps	Goals	Apps	Goals
Gutiérrez	2014	Torneo Federal B	15	0	0	0	—		—		0	0	15	0
Gutiérrez	2015	Torneo Federal A	28	2	0	0	—		—		1 (Note: One appearance in 2015 Torneo Federal A play-offs)	0	29	2
Gutiérrez	Total		43	2	0	0	—		—		1	0	44	2
Godoy Cruz	2016	Primera División	1	0	0	0	—		—		0	0	1	0
Godoy Cruz	2016–17	Primera División	10	0	2	0	—		1 (Note: One appearance in 2017 Copa Libertadores)	0	0	0	13	0
Godoy Cruz	2017–18	Primera División	8	1	1	0	—		1 (Note: One appearance in 2017 Copa Libertadores)	0	0	0	10	1
Godoy Cruz	Total		19	1	3	0	—		2	0	0	0	24	1
Career total			62	3	3	0	—		2	0	1	0	68	3
