= Juan Barinaga (footballer, born June 2000) =

Argentine professional footballer

Personal information
- Full name: Juan Pablo Barinaga
- Date of birth: 13 June 2000 (age 26)
- Place of birth: Paraná, Argentina
- Position: Midfielder

Team information
- Current team: Patronato
- Number: 8

Youth career
- Colón
- 2016–2020: Patronato

Senior career*
Years	Team	Apps	(Gls)
2020–	Patronato	116	(3)
- * Club domestic league appearances and goals as of 18:00, 23 March 2026 (UTC)

Juan Pablo Barinaga (born 13 June 2000) is an Argentine professional footballer who plays as a midfielder for Patronato.

== Career ==
Barinaga joined Patronato from Colón in 2016. After four years progressing through their youth ranks, Barinaga made the breakthrough into Gustavo Álvarez's first-team squad in 2020. He initially featured during pre-season, notably scoring in a friendly match with Atlético Paraná on 11 January. Barinaga made his senior debut on 14 December 2020 during a 4–0 defeat in the Copa de la Liga Profesional away to Rosario Central, as the midfielder replaced Fernando Luna with thirteen minutes left.

== Career statistics ==
As of 15 December 2020.

Appearances and goals by club, season and competition
Club	Season	League			Cup		League Cup		Continental		Other		Total	
Club	Season	Division	Apps	Goals	Apps	Goals	Apps	Goals	Apps	Goals	Apps	Goals	Apps	Goals
Patronato	2020–21 (Note: Soccerway counts Copa de la Liga Profesional appearances as league appearances.)	Primera División	1	0	0	0	0	0	—		0	0	1	0
Career total			1	0	0	0	0	0	—		0	0	1	0
