= Alexander Sosa =

Argentine professional footballer

Personal information
- Full name: Alexander Sebastián Sosa
- Date of birth: 18 May 2001 (age 25)
- Place of birth: El Tío, Argentina
- Position: Centre-forward

Team information
- Current team: Wilstermann

Youth career
- El Trébol
- Talleres
- El Trébol
- 2019–2020: Patronato

Senior career*
Years	Team	Apps	(Gls)
- El Trébol
2020–2023	Patronato	47	(4)
2024–2025	Sportivo Trinidense	1	(0)
2024	→ Ferro Carril Oeste (loan)	12	(0)
2025	→ Tristán Suárez (loan)	23	(4)
2026	Aucas	4	(0)
2026–	Wilstermann	0	(0)
- * Club domestic league appearances and goals as of 17:47, 22 August 2025 (UTC)

Alexander Sebastián Sosa (born 18 May 2001) is an Argentine professional footballer who plays as a centre-forward for Tristán Suárez, on loan from Sportivo Trinidense.

== Career ==
Sosa began as a midfielder in the ranks of El Trébol in El Tío, before moving to Talleres at the age of fifteen. However, after not featuring at any level, Sosa left shortly after to rejoin El Trébol. He initially featured for their youth sides, though soon made his senior debut in Liga San Francisco; aged seventeen. In 2019, Sosa moved to Primera División team Patronato. He was instantly transformed into a centre-forward and scored on his academy debut for them. Gustavo Álvarez would later select Sosa for his club debut, as he featured for the final nine minutes of a Copa de la Liga Profesional loss to Huracán on 29 November 2020.

== Career statistics ==
As of 30 November 2020.

Appearances and goals by club, season and competition
Club	Season	League			Cup		League Cup		Continental		Other		Total	
Club	Season	Division	Apps	Goals	Apps	Goals	Apps	Goals	Apps	Goals	Apps	Goals	Apps	Goals
Patronato	2020–21 (Note: Soccerway counts Copa de la Liga Profesional appearances as league appearances.)	Primera División	1	0	0	0	0	0	—		0	0	1	0
Career total			1	0	0	0	0	0	—		0	0	1	0
