= Jorge Valdez Chamorro =

Argentine footballer

Personal information
- Full name: Jorge Vidal Valdez Chamorro
- Date of birth: 26 May 1994 (age 32)
- Place of birth: San Vicente, Argentina
- Height: 1.76 m (5 ft 9 1/2 in)
- Position: Midfielder

Team information
- Current team: Atlanta

Youth career
- 1998–2003: Las Lomas de Guernica
- 2003–2013: Lanús

Senior career*
Years	Team	Apps	(Gls)
2013–2019	Lanús	37	(3)
2016–2017	→ Gimnasia LP (loan)	4	(0)
2018–2019	→ Nueva Chicago (loan)	22	(2)
2019–2021	Atlanta	22	(6)
2021	Guaraní	14	(3)
2022–2023	Patronato	47	(3)
2024	Macará	27	(1)
2025–	Atlanta	21	(2)

International career
2011	Argentina U17	1	(0)
- * Club domestic league appearances and goals as of 17:15, 20 July 2025 (UTC)

Jorge Vidal Valdez Chamorro (born 26 May 1994) is an Argentine professional footballer who plays as a midfielder for Atlanta.

== Career ==
=== Club ===
Valdez Chamorro had youth spells with Las Lomas de Guernica and Lanús. He began his senior career with Argentine Primera División side Lanús in 2013. His professional debut came on 20 May in a goalless tie with Tigre, which was one of two games during 2012–13. In 2013–14, Valdez Chamorro scored the first two goals of his career after scoring twice in a 1–4 win over San Lorenzo on 12 April 2014. In his first four seasons with Lanús, he scored three goals in forty-two appearances in all competitions. In February 2016, Valdez Chamorro joined Primera División team Gimnasia y Esgrima on loan.

He remained with Gimnasia y Esgrima for two campaigns but made just four appearances. Valdez Chamorro returned to Lanús in June 2017, prior to joining Nueva Chicago of Primera B Nacional on loan on 6 January 2018. He made his debut for Nueva Chicago on 3 February during a win against Deportivo Riestra.

=== International ===
Oscar Garré selected Valdez Chamorro for his 2011 FIFA U-17 World Cup squad, he subsequently made his debut for the Argentina U17s on 21 June 2011 in a victory versus Jamaica.

== Career statistics ==
As of 15 May 2018.

Club statistics
Club	Season	League			Cup (Note: Includes the Copa Argentina)		League Cup		Continental (Note: Includes the Copa Libertadores and Copa Sudamericana)		Other (Note: Includes the Suruga Bank Championship)		Total	
Club	Season	Division	Apps	Goals	Apps	Goals	Apps	Goals	Apps	Goals	Apps	Goals	Apps	Goals
Lanús	2012–13	Primera División	2	0	0	0	—		—		0	0	2	0
Lanús	2013–14	Primera División	14	2	0	0	—		2 (Note: Two appearances in 2014 Copa Libertadores)	0	0	0	16	2
Lanús	2014	Primera División	8	1	0	0	—		1 (Note: One appearance in 2014 Copa Sudamericana)	0	1 (Note: One appearance in 2014 Suruga Bank Championship)	0	10	1
Lanús	2015	Primera División	13	0	1	0	—		0	0	0	0	14	0
Lanús	2016	Primera División	0	0	0	0	—		—		0	0	0	0
Lanús	2016–17	Primera División	0	0	0	0	—		0	0	0	0	0	0
Lanús	2017–18	Primera División	0	0	0	0	—		0	0	0	0	0	0
Lanús	Total		37	3	1	0	—		3	0	1	0	42	3
Gimnasia y Esgrima (loan)	2016	Primera División	1	0	0	0	—		—		0	0	1	0
Gimnasia y Esgrima (loan)	2016–17	Primera División	3	0	0	0	—		0	0	0	0	3	0
Gimnasia y Esgrima (loan)	Total		4	0	0	0	—		0	0	0	0	4	0
Nueva Chicago (loan)	2017–18	Primera B Nacional	11	2	0	0	—		—		0	0	11	2
Career total			52	5	1	0	—		3	0	1	0	57	5
