= Club Atlético Patronato =

Argentine sports club

Patronato
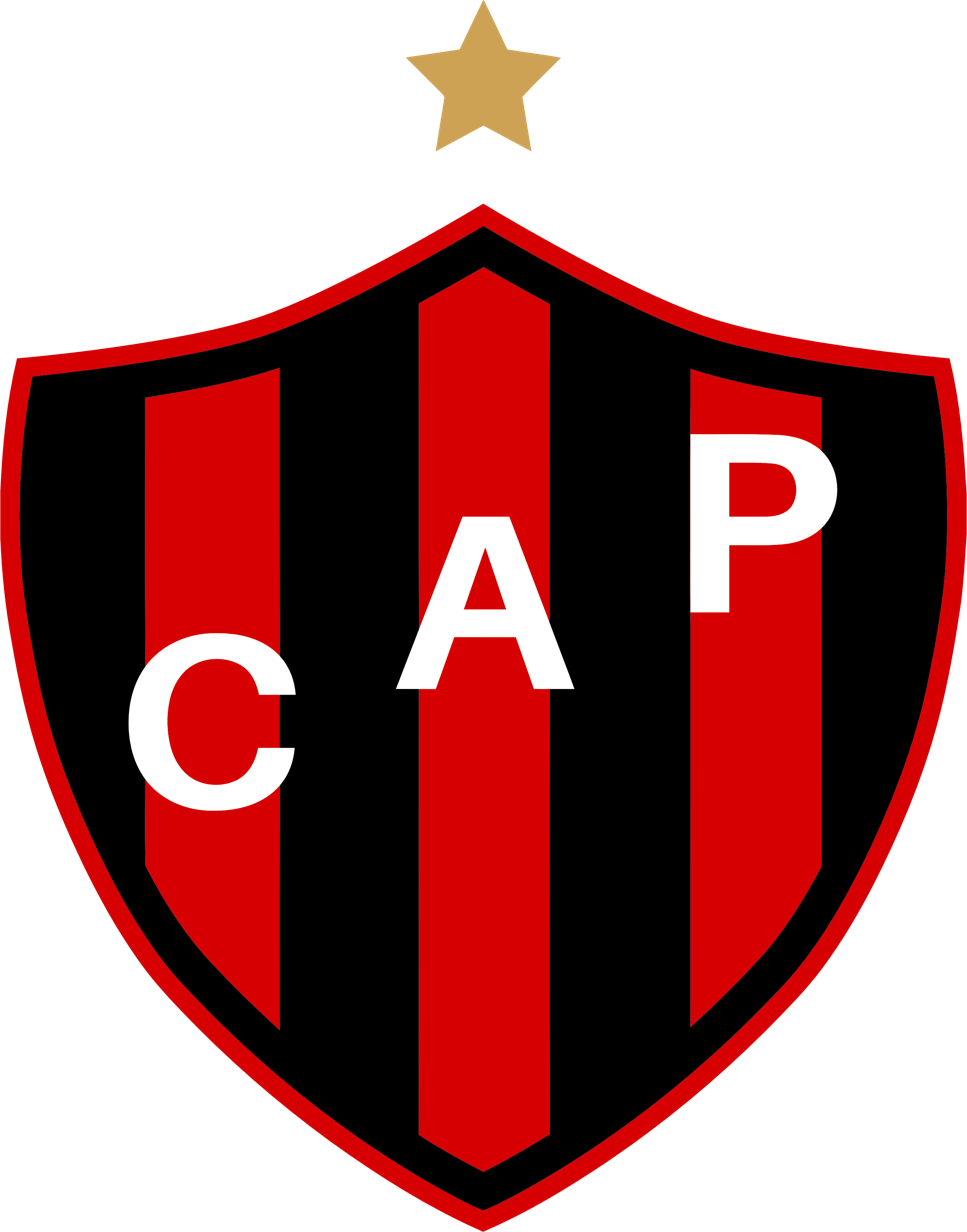
- Full name: Club Atlético Patronato de la Juventud Católica
- Nicknames: Patrón (The boss); Negro (The black); Rojinegro (Red and black); El Santo
- Founded: 1 February 1914; 112 years ago
- Ground: Estadio Presbítero Bartolomé Grella; Paraná, Entre Ríos Province
- Capacity: 22,000
- Chairman: Dante Molina
- Manager: Rubén Forestello
- League: Primera Nacional
- 2025: Primera Nacional Zone A, 8th of 18
- Website: capatronato.com
Home colours	Away colours

The Club Atlético Patronato de la Juventud Católica (commonly called Patronato or Patronato de Paraná, lit. 'Patronage of Parana') is an Argentine sports club based in Paraná, Entre Ríos Province.

The club is mostly known for its football team currently competes in Primera Nacional, the second division of the Argentine football league system. Other sports sections of the club include basketball, volleyball, artistic roller skating, judo, and karate.

== History ==
The club debuted in Primera División in 1978, playing the Nacional championship. In December 2015, Patronato achieved its second promotion to Primera after defeating Santamarina de Tandil by penalty shoot-out. Patronato was relegated to the Primera Nacional in 2022, despite winning the 2021-22 Copa Argentina and qualifying for the Copa Libertadores group stage that same year.

On April 5, 2023, Patronato made their debut in the Copa Libertadores, losing by a scoreline of 2-1 against Atlético Nacional. A little less than a month later, on May 4, 2023, Patronato won their first ever Libertadores match, winning comfortably at home against Melgar 4-1. They ended their Libertadores campaign with 2 wins and 4 losses, but finished 3rd in their group, qualifying for the Copa Sudamericana play-off round, where they lost to Botafogo by 3-1 on aggregate.

== Rivalries ==
The clubs with which it has a classic sporting rivalry are the Club Atlético Paraná, from the same city, with which they make up the "Paraná derby" and the Club Gimnasia y Esgrima from the city of Concepción del Uruguay, with which they make up the "Entre Ríos derby".

== Players ==
=== Current squad ===
As of 12 September 2022.

Note: Flags indicate national team as defined under FIFA eligibility rules; some limited exceptions apply. Players may hold more than one non-FIFA nationality.

No.	Pos.	Nation	Player
1	GK	ARG	Franco Rivasseau
2	DF	ARG	Carlos Quintana (loan from Argentinos)
4	DF	ARG	Lautaro Geminiani
5	DF	ARG	Leonel Mosevich (loan from Arg. Juniors)
6	MF	ARG	Tiago Banega (loan from Racing Club)
7	FW	ARG	Nicolás Castro
8	FW	ARG	Jonás Acevedo (loan from Huracán)
9	FW	ARG	Jonathan Herrera (loan from Johor DT)
10	MF	ARG	Jorge Valdez Chamorro
11	FW	ARG	Matías Pardo (loan from Sol de América)
13	DF	ARG	Sergio Ojeda
14	MF	ARG	Brian Nievas
15	MF	ARG	Fabio Vázquez
16	MF	ARG	Juan Barinaga
17	DF	ARG	Francisco Álvarez (loan from Talleres)

No.	Pos.	Nation	Player
18	FW	ARG	José Barreto
19	FW	ARG	Marcelo Estigarribia
20	GK	ARG	Facundo Altamirano (loan from Banfield)
21	MF	ARG	Sebastián Medina (loan from Guillermo Brown)
22	DF	ARG	Raúl Lozano (loan from Quilmes)
26	DF	ARG	Martín Aruga
27	DF	ARG	Juan Guasone
28	DF	ARG	Facundo Cobos
29	FW	ARG	Axel Rodríguez (loan from Olimpo)
30	DF	ARG	Lucas Kruspzky
32	MF	ARG	Franco Leys
34	GK	ARG	Matías Mansilla (loan from Deportivo Morón)
40	FW	ARG	Justo Giani (loan from Newell's)
77	FW	COL	Emerson Batalla (loan from América)
89	FW	ARG	Alexander Sosa

=== Out on loan ===
Note: Flags indicate national team as defined under FIFA eligibility rules; some limited exceptions apply. Players may hold more than one non-FIFA nationality.

No.	Pos.	Nation	Player
—	FW	ARG	Lautaro Comas (at Guaireña until 31 December 2022)

== Honours ==
=== National ===
==== League ====
- Torneo Argentino A
  - Winners (1): 2009–10
- Torneo Argentino B
  - Winners (1): 2007–08

==== National cups ====
- Copa Argentina
  - Winners (1): 2021–22

=== Regional ===
- Liga Paranaense de Fútbol
  - Winners (32): 1942, 1945, 1950, 1953, 1954, 1955, 1957, 1960, 1965, 1968, 1969, 1972, 1973, 1977, 1984, 1988, 1989, Ap. 1990, Cl. 1991, Ap. 1992, Cl. 1992, Cl. 1993, Ap. 1994, Cl. 1994, Ap. 1995, Ap. 1998, Cl. 2000, Ap. 2002, Ap. 2007, Cl. 2007, Copa 2023, Superfinal 2023
