= 2026 Club Atlético Boca Juniors season =

Boca Juniors
2026 season
- President: Juan Román Riquelme
- Manager: Claudio Úbeda (until 2 June); Rodolfo Arruabarrena (from 18 June)
- Stadium: Estadio Alberto J. Armando
- Torneo Apertura: 2nd Round of 16
- Torneo Clausura: 8th
- Copa Argentina: Round of 64
- Copa Libertadores: Group stage
- Copa Sudamericana: Final
- Top goalscorer: League: Miguel Merentiel (10); All: Miguel Merentiel (15)
Home colours	Away colours	Third colours

The 2026 Club Atlético Boca Juniors season is the 98th consecutive season in the top flight of Argentine football. In addition to the domestic league; divided in two tournaments, Boca Juniors are participating in this season's editions of the Copa Argentina and Copa Libertadores.

== Season overview ==
=== January ===
Gabriel Aranda, Norberto Briasco, Renzo Giampaoli, Gonzalo Maroni, Gonzalo Morales, Agustín Obando, Nicolás Orsini, Juan Ramírez, Jabes Saralegui, Bruno Valdez and Marcelo Weigandt returned from their respective loans. Frank Fabra and Cristian Lema ended their contract with the club. Luis Advíncula and Bruno Valdez agreed to mutually terminate their contract with club. Ignacio Miramón ended his loan in the club and returned to Lille. Nazareno Solís is transferred to Deportivo Madryn. Agustín Obando is loaned to Atlético de Rafaela. Gabriel Aranda is loaned to Racing (C). Valentino Simoni is loaned to Gimnasia y Esgrima (M). Mateo Mendía and Santiago Dalmasso are loaned to Platense. Oscar Salomón is transferred to Newell's Old Boys. Norberto Briasco is loaned to Barracas Central. Jabes Saralegui is loaned again to Tigre. On 25 January, Boca defeated Deportivo Riestra 1–0. Ángel Romero arrives as a free agent from Corinthians and Santiago Ascacíbar is transferred from Estudiantes (LP). Brian Aguirre is loaned to Estudiantes (LP). Gonzalo Maroni is loaned to Barracas Central. On 28 January, Boca lost 1–2 against Estudiantes (LP).

=== February ===
On 1 February, Boca defeated Newell's Old Boys 2–0. On 8 February, Boca lost 1–2 against Vélez Sarsfield. On 15 February Boca drew 0–0 against Platense. On 20 February Boca drew 0–0 against Racing. Adam Bareiro arrives from Fortaleza. On 24 February, Boca defeated Gimnasia y Esgrima (Ch) 2-0 and advanced to the round of 32 of Copa Argentina. On 28 February, Boca drew 1–1 against Gimnasia y Esgrima (M).

=== March ===
On 4 March, Boca defeated Lanús 3–0. Lucas Blondel is loaned to Huracán. On 11 March, Boca drew 1–1 against San Lorenzo. On 15 March, Boca drew 1–1 against Unión. On 22 March, Boca defeated Instituto 2–0.

=== April ===
On 2 April, Boca defeated Talleres (C) 1–0. On 7 April, Boca defeated Universidad Católica 2–1 in Copa Libertadores. On 11 April, Boca drew 1–1 against Independiente. On 14 April, Boca defeated Barcelona 3–0 in Copa Libertadores. On 19 April, Boca won the Superclásico against River Plate 1–0. On 23 April, Boca defeated Defensa y Justicia 4–0. On 28 April, Boca lost 0–1 against Cruzeiro in Copa Libertadores.

=== May ===
On 2 May, Boca defeated Central Córdoba (SdE) 2-1. On 5 May, Boca lost 0–1 against Barcelona in Copa Libertadores. On 9 May Boca is eliminated from Torneo Apertura after a 2–3 defeat against Huracán. On 19 May, Boca drew 1–1 against Cruzeiro in Copa Libertadores. On 28 May, Boca lost 0–1 against Universidad Católica in Copa Libertadores, finishing third in the group and qualifying for Copa Sudamericana.

=== June ===
On 2 June, Claudio Úbeda is sacked. Ander Herrera agreed to mutually terminate his contract with club. On 18 June Rodolfo Arruabarrena is appointed as new head coach. Leandro Lozano arrives from Argentinos Juniors.

=== July ===
Edinson Cavani and Nicolás Orsini agreed to mutually terminate their contract with the club. Agustín Martegani is loaned to Independiente Medellín. On 16 July, Boca defeated Sarmiento (J) 2-0 and advanced to the round of 16 of Copa Argentina. Álvaro Montero arrives from Vélez Sarsfield and Sebastián Villa arrives from Independiente Rivadavia. On 23 July, Boca defeated O'Higgins 1–0 in Copa Sudamericana. On 23 July, Boca lost 0–3 against Deportivo Riestra. Lucas Janson is loaned to Gimnasia y Esgrima (LP). On 30 July Boca lost 0-1 against O'Higgins but advanced on penalties in Copa Sudamericana.

=== August ===
On 2 August, Boca drew 2–2 against Newell's Old Boys. Iker Zufiaurre is loaned to Albion F.C.. On 5 August, Boca defeated Estudiantes (LP) 1–0. On 8 August, Boca drew 1–1 against Vélez Sarsfield. Enner Valencia arrives as a free agent. On 11 August, Boca defeated Recoleta 3–1 in Copa Sudamericana. Marcelo Saracchi is transferred to Houston Dynamo. On 15 August, Boca drew 1–1 against Platense. On 18 August, Boca defeated Recoleta 4–0 advancing to the quarterfinals of Copa Sudamericana. Marcelo Weigandt is loaned to LDU Quito. On 23 August, Boca drew 1–1 against Racing. Gonzalo Gelini is loaned to Peñarol. On 29 August, Boca defeated Lanús 1–0. Juan Barinaga is loaned to Racing.

=== September ===
Exequiel Zeballos is transferred to Monza. On 2 September, Boca advanced to the quarterfinals of Copa Argentina after defeating Vélez Sarsfield 4-3 on penalties. On 5 September, Boca drew 2–2 against Gimnasia y Esgrima (M). On 8 September, Boca defeated São Paulo 1–0 in Copa Sudamericana. On 11 September, Boca defeated Central Córdoba (SdE) 3–1. Kevin Zenón is transferred to Atlas. On 15 September, Boca drew with São Paulo 1–1 and advanced to the semifinals of Copa Sudamericana. On 20 September, Boca defeated San Lorenzo 2–0. On 27 September, Boca advanced to the semifinals of Copa Argentina after defeating Racing 3-2.

=== October ===
On 2 October, Boca defeated Unión 3–0. On 9 October, Boca drew 2–2 against Instituto. On 13 October, Boca lost 0-1 against Vasco da Gama in Copa Sudamericana. On 2 October, Boca defeated Talleres (C) 2–1. On 20 October, Boca defeated Vasco da Gama 3–1 and advanced to the Final of Copa Sudamericana. On 25 October, Boca defeated Independiente 1–0.

=== November ===
On 1 November, Boca won the Superclásico against River Plate 1–0. On 7 November, Boca defeated Defensa y Justicia 1–0, winning the 2026 AFA Liga Profesional de Fútbol. On 14 November, Boca advanced to the final of Copa Argentina after defeating Banfield 3–0. On 21 november Boca defeated Atlético Mineiro 2–0, winning the 2026 Copa Sudamericana.

== Current squad ==
Last updated on November 21, 2026.

Squad no.	Name	Nationality	Position	Date of birth (age)	Apps	Goals	Last team	Note
Goalkeepers
1	Álvaro Montero	(Colombia)	GK	29 March 1995 (age 31)	25	-18	(Argentina) Vélez Sarsfield	
12	Leandro Brey	(Argentina)	GK	21 September 2002 (age 24)	45	-28	(Argentina) Los Andes	
30	Javier García	(Argentina)	GK	29 January 1987 (age 39)	75	-91	(Argentina) Racing	
	Agustín Marchesín	(Argentina)	GK	16 March 1988 (age 38)	53	-40	(Brazil) Grêmio	Injured
Defenders
2	Lautaro Di Lollo	(Argentina)	DF	10 March 2004 (age 22)	94	9	(Argentina) Youth team	
3	Lautaro Blanco (VC 3º)	(Argentina)	DF	19 September 1999 (age 27)	130	2	(Spain) Elche	
4	Nicolás Figal (VC 4º)	(Argentina)	DF	3 April 1994 (age 32)	122	5	(United States) Inter Miami	
17	Leandro Lozano	(Uruguay)	DF	19 December 1998 (age 27)	21	3	(Argentina) Argentinos Juniors	
24	Dylan Gorosito	(Argentina)	DF	3 February 2006 (age 20)	11	0	(Argentina) Youth team	
26	Marco Pellegrino	(Argentina)	DF	18 July 2002 (age 24)	25	0	(Italy) AC Milan	
32	Ayrton Costa	(Argentina)	DF	12 June 1999 (age 27)	57	3	(Belgium) Royal Antwerp	
42	Facundo Herrera	(Argentina)	DF	11 July 2006 (age 20)	17	1	(Argentina) Youth team	
46	Matías Satas	(Argentina)	DF	28 February 2008 (age 18)	2	0	(Argentina) Youth team	
Midfielders
5	Leandro Paredes (C)	(Argentina)	MF	29 June 1994 (age 32)	91	10	(Italy) Roma	
6	Rodrigo Battaglia	(Argentina)	MF	12 July 1991 (age 35)	38	5	(Brazil) Atlético Mineiro	
7	Carlos Palacios	(Chile)	MF	19 July 2000 (age 26)	48	3	(Chile) Colo-Colo	
8	Tomás Belmonte	(Argentina)	MF	27 May 1998 (age 28)	68	2	(Mexico) Toluca	
10	Tomás Aranda	(Argentina)	MF	9 May 2007 (age 19)	35	1	(Argentina) Youth team	
15	Williams Alarcón	(Chile)	MF	29 November 2000 (age 25)	39	0	(Argentina) Huracán	
18	Milton Delgado	(Argentina)	MF	16 June 2005 (age 21)	87	1	(Argentina) Youth team	
23	Camilo Rey Domenech	(Argentina)	MF	10 March 2006 (age 20)	15	0	(Argentina) Youth team	
25	Santiago Ascacíbar	(Argentina)	MF	25 February 1997 (age 29)	46	8	(Argentina) Estudiantes (LP)	
27	Malcom Braida	(Argentina)	MF	17 May 1997 (age 29)	22	0	(Argentina) San Lorenzo	
Forwards
9	Milton Giménez	(Argentina)	FW	12 August 1996 (age 30)	72	21	(Argentina) Banfield	
11	Ángel Romero	(Paraguay)	FW	4 July 1992 (age 34)	23	3	(Brazil) Corinthians	
13	Enner Valencia	(Ecuador)	FW	4 November 1989 (age 37)	19	6	(Mexico) Pachuca	
16	Miguel Merentiel (VC 2º)	(Uruguay)	FW	24 February 1996 (age 30)	191	66	(Brazil) Palmeiras	
19	Leonel Flores	(Argentina)	FW	6 February 2007 (age 19)	27	5	(Argentina) Youth team	
20	Alan Velasco	(Argentina)	FW	27 July 2002 (age 24)	63	6	(United States) FC Dallas	
22	Sebastián Villa	(Colombia)	FW	19 May 1996 (age 30)	198	31	(Argentina) Independiente Rivadavia	
28	Adam Bareiro	(Paraguay)	FW	26 July 1996 (age 30)	14	6	(Brazil) Fortaleza	
44	Rodrigo Bacidalupe	(Argentina)	FW	22 July 2007 (age 19)	2	0	(Argentina) Youth team	

== Transfers ==
=== Summer ===
==== In ====
Players transferred
Pos.	Name	Club	Fee
FW	(Paraguay) Adam Bareiro	(Brazil) Fortaleza	Undisclosed

Players loaned
Pos.	Name	Club	End date

Loan Return
Pos.	Name	Return from
DF	(Argentina) Gabriel Aranda	(Argentina) Quilmes
DF	(Argentina) Renzo Giampaoli	(Argentina) Gimnasia y Esgrima (LP)
DF	(Paraguay) Bruno Valdez	(Paraguay) Cerro Porteño
DF	(Argentina) Marcelo Weigandt	(United States) Inter Miami
MF	(Argentina) Gonzalo Maroni	(Argentina) Newell's Old Boys
MF	(Argentina) Juan Ramírez	(Argentina) Lanús
MF	(Argentina) Jabes Saralegui	(Argentina) Tigre
FW	(Armenia) Norberto Briasco	(Argentina) Gimnasia y Esgrima (LP)
FW	(Argentina) Gonzalo Morales	(Argentina) Barracas Central
FW	(Argentina) Agustín Obando	(Argentina) Banfield
FW	(Argentina) Nicolás Orsini	(Argentina) Platense

==== Out ====
Players transferred
Pos.	Name	Club	Fee
DF	(Peru) Luis Advíncula	(Peru) Alianza Lima	Free
DF	(Colombia) Frank Fabra	(Colombia) Independiente Medellín	Free
DF	(Argentina) Cristian Lema		Free
DF	(Argentina) Oscar Salomón	(Argentina) Newell's Old Boys	Undisclosed
DF	(Paraguay) Bruno Valdez	(Paraguay) Sportivo Trinidense	Free
FW	(Argentina) Nazareno Solís	(Argentina) Deportivo Madryn	Undisclosed

Players loaned
Pos.	Name	Club	End date
DF	(Argentina) Gabriel Aranda	(Argentina) Racing (C)	December 2026
DF	(Argentina) Lucas Blondel	(Argentina) Huracán	December 2026
DF	(Argentina) Mateo Mendía	(Argentina) Platense	December 2026
MF	(Argentina) Santiago Dalmasso	(Argentina) Platense	December 2026
MF	(Argentina) Gonzalo Maroni	(Argentina) Barracas Central	December 2026
MF	(Argentina) Jabes Saralegui	(Argentina) Tigre	December 2026
FW	(Argentina) Brian Aguirre	(Argentina) Estudiantes (LP)	December 2026
FW	(Argentina) Norberto Briasco	(Argentina) Barracas Central	December 2026
FW	(Argentina) Agustín Obando	(Argentina) Atlético de Rafaela	December 2026
FW	(Argentina) Valentino Simoni	(Argentina) Gimnasia y Esgrima (M)	December 2026

Loan return
Pos.	Name	Return to
MF	(Argentina) Ignacio Miramón	(France) Lille

=== Winter ===
==== In ====
Players transferred
Pos.	Name	Club	Fee
GK	(Colombia) Álvaro Montero	(Argentina) Vélez Sarsfield	Undisclosed
DF	(Uruguay) Leandro Lozano	(Argentina) Argentinos Juniors	Undisclosed
FW	(Ecuador) Enner Valencia	(Mexico) Pachuca	Free
FW	(Colombia) Sebastián Villa	(Argentina) Independiente Rivadavia	Undisclosed

Players loaned
Pos.	Name	Club	End date

Loan Return
Pos.	Name	Return from

==== Out ====
Players transferred
Pos.	Name	Club	Fee
DF	(Uruguay) Marcelo Saracchi	(United States) Houston Dynamo	Undisclosed
MF	(Spain) Ander Herrera	(Spain) Real Zaragoza	Free
MF	(Argentina) Kevin Zenón	(Mexico) Atlas	Undisclosed
FW	(Uruguay) Edinson Cavani		Free
FW	(Argentina) Nicolás Orsini	(Argentina) Barracas Central	Free
FW	(Argentina) Exequiel Zeballos	(Italy) Monza	Undisclosed

Players loaned
Pos.	Name	Club	End date
DF	(Argentina) Juan Barinaga	(Argentina) Racing	July 2027
DF	(Argentina) Marcelo Weigandt	(Ecuador) LDU Quito	July 2027
MF	(Argentina) Agustín Martegani	(Colombia) Independiente Medellín	July 2027
FW	(Argentina) Gonzalo Gelini	(Uruguay) Peñarol	July 2027
FW	(Argentina) Lucas Janson	(Argentina) Gimnasia y Esgrima (LP)	July 2027
FW	(Argentina) Iker Zufiaurre	(Uruguay) Albion F.C.	July 2027

Loan return
Pos.	Name	Return to

== Competitions ==
=== Overall ===
Competition	First match	Last match	Starting round	Final position	Record							
Competition	First match	Last match	Starting round	Final position	Pld	W	D	L	GF	GA	GD	Win %
Torneo Apertura	25 January	May 9	Matchday 1	Round of 16	17	8	6	3	24	12	+12	47.06
Torneo Clausura	26 July	TBD	Matchday 1	TBD	16	9	6	1	24	14	+10	56.25
Copa Argentina	February 24	December 2	Round of 64	TBD	5	4	1	0	10	2	+8	80.00
Copa Libertadores	April 8	May 28	Group stage	Group stage	6	2	1	3	6	5	+1	33.33
Copa Sudamericana	July 23	November 21	Knockout round play-offs	Winners	9	6	1	2	15	5	+10	66.67
Total					53	29	15	9	79	38	+41	54.72

Last updated: November 21
Source: Competitions

=== Primera División ===
==== Torneo Apertura ====
===== Group stage =====
====== Zone A ======
Pos	Team	Pld	W	D	L	GF	GA	GD	Pts	Qualification
1	Estudiantes (LP)	16	9	4	3	19	7	+12	31	Advance to round of 16
2	Boca Juniors	16	8	6	2	22	9	+13	30	Advance to round of 16
3	Vélez Sarsfield	16	7	7	2	18	12	+6	28	Advance to round of 16
4	Talleres (C)	16	7	5	4	17	13	+4	26	Advance to round of 16
5	Independiente	16	6	6	4	24	20	+4	24	Advance to round of 16

Source: AFA

===== Results summary =====
Overall								Home						Away					
Pld	W	D	L	GF	GA	GD	Pts	W	D	L	GF	GA	GD	W	D	L	GF	GA	GD
16	8	6	2	22	9	+13	30	3	5	0	8	3	+5	5	1	2	14	6	+8

Source: AFA

===== Results by round =====
Round	1	2	3	4	5	6	8	7^{1}	10	11	12	13	14	15	16	9^{2}
Ground	H	A	H	A	H	H	A	H	A	H	A	H	A	H	A	A
Result	W	L	W	L	D	D	D	W	D	D	W	W	D	W	W	W
Position	3	8	4	6	7	9	9	6	7	7	6	3	4	3	2	2

Source: AFA
A = Away; H = Home; W = Win; D = Draw; L = Loss

^{1} Match postponed due Lanus' involvement in the 2026 Recopa Sudamericana.
^{2} Match postponed by AFA.

===== Matches =====
Win Draw Loss Postponed

25 January 1	Boca Juniors	1–0	Deportivo Riestra	Buenos Aires
18:30 UTC−3	Janson (yellow card) 51'; Di Lollo 76'	Report	Goitía (yellow card) 6'; Benegas (yellow card) 34'; Barbieri (yellow card) 54'; Miño (yellow card) 63'; Watson (yellow card) 80'	Stadium: La Bombonera; Referee: Sebastián Zunino

28 January 2	Estudiantes (LP)	2–1	Boca Juniors	La Plata
22:15 UTC−3	Núñez 27'; González Pírez 38'; Pérez (yellow card) 53'; Benedetti (yellow card) 70'	Report	Paredes (yellow card) 53'; Zeballos 80'	Stadium: Jorge Luis Hirschi; Referee: Pablo Echavarría

1 February 3	Boca Juniors	2–0	Newell's Old Boys	Buenos Aires
19:15 UTC−3	Zufiaurre (yellow card) 36'; Blanco 39'; Di Lollo (yellow card) 45+1'; Paredes 55' (pen.); Ascacíbar (yellow card) 63'	Report	Gómez Mattar (yellow card) 13'; Herrera (yellow card) 18'; Luciano (yellow card) 27'	Stadium: La Bombonera; Referee: Darío Herrera

8 February 4	Vélez Sarsfield	2–1	Boca Juniors	Buenos Aires
22:15 UTC−3	Pellegrini 63', 66'	Report	Paredes (yellow card) 46'; Zufiaurre 90'	Stadium: José Amalfitani Stadium; Referee: Nazareno Arasa

15 February 5	Boca Juniors	0–0	Platense	Buenos Aires
19:30 UTC−3	Di Lollo (yellow card) 40'	Report	Heredia (yellow card) 44'	Stadium: La Bombonera; Referee: Sebastián Zunino

20 February 6	Boca Juniors	0–0	Racing	Buenos Aires
20:00 UTC−3	Costa (yellow card) 18'; Alarcón (yellow card) 45+1'	Report	Sosa (yellow card) 12'; Miljevic (yellow card) 18'; Martínez (yellow card) 42'; Pardo (yellow card) 74'; Di Cesare (yellow card) 87'	Stadium: La Bombonera; Referee: Leandro Rey Hilfer

28 February 8	Boca Juniors	1–1	Gimnasia y Esgrima (M)	Buenos Aires
17:45 UTC−3	Delgado (yellow card) 13'; Ascacíbar (yellow card) 32'; Bareiro (yellow card) 40'; Merentiel 41'	Report	L. Paredes 15'; Petruchi (yellow card) 45+1'; Barboza (yellow card) 52'; Sánchez (yellow card) 63'; Lencioni (yellow card) 64'	Stadium: La Bombonera; Referee: Pablo Dóvalo

4 March 7	Lanús	0–3	Boca Juniors	Lanús
21:00 UTC−3	Canale (yellow card) 16'; Aquino (yellow card) 65'; Izquierdoz (yellow card) 78'	Report	Ascacíbar 14'; Di Lollo (yellow card) 16'; Merentiel 29', 63'; Paredes (yellow card) 71'; Bareiro (yellow card) 79'	Stadium: Ciudad de Lanús; Referee: Darío Herrera
Note: Match postponed due Lanus' involvement in the 2026 Recopa Sudamericana

3 March 9	Central Córdoba (SdE)	v	Boca Juniors	Santiago del Estero
19:15 UTC−3		Report		Stadium: Único Madre de Ciudades

11 March 10	Boca Juniors	1–1	San Lorenzo	Buenos Aires
19:45 UTC−3	Paredes (yellow card) 44'; Aranda (yellow card) 45+2'; Ascacíbar 54'; Merentiel (yellow card) 80'	Report	Cuello (yellow card) 12'; Romaña (yellow card) 62'; Rodríguez 64'; Tripichio (yellow card) 80'	Stadium: La Bombonera; Referee: Pablo Echavarría

15 March 11	Unión	1–1	Boca Juniors	Santa Fe
22:00 UTC−3	Cuello (yellow card) 25'; Palacios 41' (yellow card) 57'	Report	Aranda (yellow card) 21'; Ascacíbar (yellow card) 30'; Merentiel 57'; Costa (yellow card) 74'	Stadium: 15 de Abril; Referee: Yael Falcón Pérez

22 March 12	Boca Juniors	2–0	Instituto	Buenos Aires
20:00 UTC−3	Aranda 50'; Bareiro 55'	Report	Córdoba (yellow card) 45'; Guerra (yellow card) 90+5'	Stadium: La Bombonera; Referee: Leandro Rey Hilfer

2 April 13	Talleres (C)	0–1	Boca Juniors	Córdoba
20:30 UTC−3	Schott (yellow card) 18'; Báez (yellow card) 65'	Report	Belmonte (yellow card) 20'; Bareiro 71'; Paredes (yellow card) 89'	Stadium: Mario Alberto Kempes; Referee: Nazareno Arasa

11 April 14	Boca Juniors	1–1	Independiente	Buenos Aires
19:30 UTC−3	Giménez 45+10' (pen.)	Report	Abaldo 8' (yellow card) 34'; Ávalos (yellow card) 75'; Zabala (yellow card) 65'	Stadium: La Bombonera; Referee: Andrés Merlos

19 April 15	River Plate	0–1	Boca Juniors	Buenos Aires
17:30 UTC−3	Colidio (yellow card) 33'; Rivero (yellow card) 41'; Acuña (yellow card) 59'; Martínez Quarta (yellow card) 83'; Salas (yellow card) 90+3'; Montiel (yellow card) 90+4'	Report	Bareiro (yellow card) 12'; Paredes 45+6' (pen.) (yellow card) 59'; Giménez (yellow card) 85'; Herrera (yellow card) 90+3'	Stadium: Monumental; Referee: Darío Herrera

23 April 16	Defensa y Justicia	0–4	Boca Juniors	Florencio Varela
20:00 UTC−3	Botta (yellow card) 72'	Report	Giménez 22'; Delgado (yellow card) 46'; Bareiro (yellow card) 72' (goal) 81'; Velasco 77'; Merentiel 90+2'	Stadium: Norberto Tomaghello; Referee: Andrés Gariano

2 May 9	Central Córdoba (SdE)	1–2	Boca Juniors	Santiago del Estero
16:15 UTC−3	Martínez (yellow card) 14'; Santos 56'; Iacobellis (yellow card) 87'; Maciel (yellow card) 90+3'	Report	Barinaga (yellow card) 19'; Belmonte (yellow card) 38'; Velasco 43'; Giménez 45'; Delgado (yellow card) 79'	Stadium: Único Madre de Ciudades; Referee: Nazareno Arasa
Note: Matchday 9 was originally scheduled to take place from 5 to 8 March. However, it was postponed until the week of 3 May due to a strike called by the Argentine Football Association (AFA) following accusations by the Customs Revenue and Control Agency (ARCA) against Claudio Tapia and Pablo Toviggino, AFA President and Treasurer respectively, for alleged tax evasion. The strike was confirmed on 3 March 2026.

===== Final stages =====
9 May Round of 16	Boca Juniors	2–3 (a.e.t.)	Huracán	Buenos Aires
19:00 UTC−3	Paredes (yellow card) 83'; Giménez 86'; A. Romero 110'	Report	Gil 4'; Carrizo (yellow card) 41'; Waller (yellow card) 59'; Ibáñez (yellow card) 75'; Pereyra (yellow card) 83' (yellow-red card) 105+1'; Ó. Romero 93' (pen.), 102' (pen.); Ramírez (red card) 105+1'	Stadium: La Bombonera; Referee: Pablo Echavarría

==== Torneo Clausura ====
===== League table =====
====== Zone A ======
Pos	Team	Pld	W	D	L	GF	GA	GD	Pts	Qualification
1	Instituto	16	10	4	2	26	15	+11	34	Advance to round of 16
2	Boca Juniors	16	9	6	1	24	14	+10	33	Advance to round of 16
3	Vélez Sarsfield	16	7	7	2	25	17	+8	28	Advance to round of 16
4	Defensa y Justicia	16	8	4	4	21	15	+6	28	Advance to round of 16
5	Lanús	16	7	5	4	19	12	+7	26	Advance to round of 16

Source: LPF

===== International qualification =====
Pos	Team	Pld	W	D	L	GF	GA	GD	Pts	Qualification or relegation
1	Boca Juniors (C, Q)	32	17	12	3	46	23	+23	63	Qualification for Copa Libertadores group stage
2	Rosario Central (Q)	32	18	8	6	46	28	+18	62	Qualification for Copa Libertadores group stage
3	Argentinos Juniors (T)	32	17	9	6	37	27	+10	60	Qualification for Copa Libertadores second stage
4	Independiente Rivadavia (X)	32	16	9	7	50	39	+11	57	Qualification for Copa Sudamericana group stage
5	Gimnasia y Esgrima (LP) (X)	32	17	6	9	44	39	+5	57	Qualification for Copa Sudamericana group stage

Source: AFA
Rules for classification: 1) points; 2) goal difference; 3) goals scored; 4) fair play ranking; 5) drawing of lots.
(C) Champions; (Q) Qualified for the phase indicated; (T) Qualified, but not yet for the particular phase indicated; (X) Assured of Copa Sudamericana, but may still qualify for Copa Libertadores

===== Relegation =====
Pos	Team	2024 Pts	2025 Pts	2026 Pts	Total Pts	Total Pld	Avg	Relegation
1	Boca Juniors	67	62	63	192	105	1.829	
2	River Plate	70	53	55	178	105	1.695	
3	Rosario Central	47	66	62	175	105	1.667	

===== Results summary =====
Overall								Home						Away					
Pld	W	D	L	GF	GA	GD	Pts	W	D	L	GF	GA	GD	W	D	L	GF	GA	GD
16	9	6	1	24	14	+10	33	7	1	0	13	3	+10	2	5	1	11	11	0

Source: AFA

===== Results by round =====
Round	1	2	3	4	5	6	7	8	9	10	11	12	13	14	15	16
Ground	A	H	A	H	A	A	H	A	H	A	H	A	H	A	H	H
Result	L	W	D	D	D	D	W	D	W	W	W	D	W	W	W	W
Position	15	7	13	9	10	11	8	8	5	5	4	3	2	3	2	2

Source: AFA
A = Away; H = Home; W = Win; D = Draw; L = Loss

===== Matches =====
Win Draw Loss Postponed

July 26, 2026 1	Deportivo Riestra	3–0	Boca Juniors	Buenos Aires
19:30 UTC−3	Sánchez 6'; Alonso 22'; Díaz 37'; Céliz (yellow card) 67'; Goitía (yellow card) 74'; Watson (yellow card) 90'	Report		Stadium: Guillermo Laza; Referee: Hernán Mastrángelo

August 2, 2026 3	Newell's Old Boys	2–2	Boca Juniors	Rosario
17:00 UTC−3	Giannetti (yellow card) 42'; Cóccaro 49'; Regiardo (yellow card) 52' (goal) 58'	Report	Ascacíbar 29'; Costa (yellow card) 45'; Paredes (yellow card) 67'; Velasco (yellow card) 80' (goal) 80'	Stadium: Marcelo Bielsa; Referee: Andrés Merlos

August 5, 2026 2	Boca Juniors	1–0	Estudiantes (LP)	Buenos Aires
19:00 UTC−3	Ascacíbar 45'; Flores (yellow card) 73'	Report	Piovi (yellow card) 55'; Neves (yellow card) 77'; Benedetti (yellow card) 89'	Stadium: La Bombonera; Referee: Nazareno Arasa
Note: Match postponed due Boca Juniors' involvement in the 2026 Copa Sudamericana.

August 8, 2026 4	Boca Juniors	1–1	Vélez Sarsfield	Buenos Aires
19:15 UTC−3	Blanco (yellow card) 35'; Ascacíbar 38'; Costa (yellow card) 43'	Report	Valdés 11'; Robertone (yellow card) 41'; Gómez (yellow card) 54'; Pellegrini (yellow card) 59'; García (yellow card) 87'	Stadium: La Bombonera; Referee: Yael Falcón Pérez

August 15, 2026 5	Platense	1–1	Boca Juniors	Florida
21:30 UTC−3	Silva (yellow card) 16'; Retamar 52'	Report	Delgado (yellow card) 67'; Merentiel 79'; Ascacíbar (yellow card) 83'	Stadium: Ciudad de Vicente López; Referee: Jorge Baliño

August 23, 2026 6	Racing	1–1	Boca Juniors	Avellaneda
21:30 UTC−3	Rojo 8' (pen.); Martínez (yellow card) 9'; Cannavo (yellow card) 40'; Pérez (yellow card) 78'	Report	Costa (yellow card) 4'; Merentiel 27'; Belmonte (yellow card) 74'	Stadium: Presidente Juan Domingo Perón; Referee: Nicolás Ramírez

August 28, 2026 7	Boca Juniors	1–0	Lanús	Buenos Aires
21:30 UTC−3	Flores (yellow card) 12'; Delgado (yellow card) 75'; Belmonte 90+3'	Report	Izquierdoz (yellow card) 43'	Stadium: La Bombonera; Referee: Pablo Dóvalo

September 5, 2026 8	Gimnasia y Esgrima (M)	2–2	Boca Juniors	Mendoza
16:30 UTC−3	Sabatini 18'; Cingolani (yellow card) 36'; Petruchi (yellow card) 61'; Fernández 90+2'	Report	Zenón (yellow card) 6' (goal) 37'; Velasco 16'; Figal (yellow card) 57'; Palacios (yellow card) 65'; Blanco (yellow card) 69'	Stadium: Víctor Legrotaglie; Referee: Darío Herrera

September 12, 2026 9	Boca Juniors	3–1	Central Córdoba (SdE)	Buenos Aires
19:15 UTC−3	Romero 4', 54'; Valencia 10'; Gorosito (yellow card) 17'; Belmonte (yellow card) 25'; Pellegrino (yellow card) 38'	Report	Sequeira (yellow card) 42'; Moyano (yellow card) 61'; Cuitiño 89'	Stadium: La Bombonera; Referee: Yael Falcón Pérez

September 20, 2026 10	San Lorenzo	0–2	Boca Juniors	Buenos Aires
14:45 UTC−3	Insaurralde (red card) 30'; Reali (yellow card) 69'; Gulli (yellow card) 79'	Report	Herrera (yellow card) 33'; Lozano (yellow card) 40' (goal) 56'; Di Lollo (yellow card) 46'; Merentiel 71'	Stadium: Pedro Bidegain; Referee: Nazareno Arasa

October 2, 2026 11	Boca Juniors	3–0	Unión	Buenos Aires
21:30 UTC−3	Herrera (yellow card) 6'; Paredes (yellow card) 16'; Di Lollo 22'; Flores 83', 90+2'	Report	Mosqueira (yellow card) 20'; Tarragona (yellow card) 38'; Malcorra (yellow card) 44'; Ayala (yellow card) 65'; Luna Diale (yellow card) 72'	Stadium: La Bombonera; Referee: Sebastián Martínez Beligoy

October 9, 2026 12	Instituto	2–2	Boca Juniors	Córdoba
19:30 UTC−3	Alarcón 13' (yellow card) 80'; Abregú (yellow card) 21'; Galván 47'; Luna (yellow card) 78'; Gallardo (yellow card) 84'	Report	Valencia 22'; Alarcón (yellow card) 52'; Merentiel 55'; Braida (yellow card) 76'; Ascacíbar (yellow card) 78'	Stadium: Presidente Perón; Referee: Leandro Rey Hilfer

October 16, 2026 13	Boca Juniors	2–1	Talleres (C)	Buenos Aires
21:30 UTC−3	Merentiel 17'; Delgado (yellow card) 33'; Flores 48'	Report	Galarza 10'; Valoyes (yellow card) 54'	Stadium: La Bombonera; Referee: Luis Lobo Medina

October 25, 2026 14	Independiente	0–1	Boca Juniors	Avellaneda
17:00 UTC−3	Marcone (yellow card) 45'; Ávila (yellow card) 52'; Pérez Curci (yellow card) 63'	Report	Di Lollo (yellow card) 19'; Delgado (yellow card) 66'; Herrera (yellow card) 76' (goal) 88'; Braida (yellow card) 90+1'	Stadium: Libertadores de América; Referee: Nazareno Arasa

November 1, 2026 15	Boca Juniors	1–0	River Plate	Buenos Aires
15:00 UTC−3	Di Lollo (yellow card) 19' (goal) 27'; Herrera (yellow card) 42'; Paredes (yellow card) 45+5'; Blanco (yellow card) 56'; Velasco (yellow card) 67'; Valencia (yellow card) 76'; Costa (yellow card) 90+6'	Report	Martínez Quarta (red card) 10'; Acuña (yellow card) 45+4'; Montiel (red card) 79'; Santos Borré (yellow card) 82'	Stadium: La Bombonera; Referee: Nicolás Ramírez

November 7, 2026 16	Boca Juniors	1–0	Defensa y Justicia	Buenos Aires
17:30 UTC−3	Paredes (yellow card) 57'; Valencia 90+5'	Report	Porcel (yellow card) 63'; Perrotta (yellow card) 88'; Sosa (yellow card) 90+6'; Loza (yellow card) 90+8'	Stadium: La Bombonera; Referee: Sebastián Zunino

===== Final stages =====
November 25, 2026 Round of 16	Boca Juniors	v	Independiente Rivadavia	Buenos Aires
21:00 UTC−3		Report		Stadium: La Bombonera
Note: Match postponed due Boca' involvement in the 2026 Copa Sudamericana final.

=== Copa Argentina ===
February 24, 2026 Round of 64	Boca Juniors	2–0	Gimnasia y Esgrima (Ch)	Salta
21:15 UTC−3	Bareiro 40', 57'; Delgado (yellow card) 16'	Report	Cáseres (yellow card) 16'; Salvaggio (yellow card) 32'; Medina (yellow card) 56'; Marfort (yellow card) 71'; Dauría (yellow card) 87'; Rosales (yellow card) 89'	Stadium: Padre Ernesto Martearena; Referee: Facundo Tello

July 16, 2026 Round of 32	Sarmiento (J)	0–2	Boca Juniors	Rosario
21:45 UTC−3	Santamaría (yellow card) 18'; Orihuela (yellow card) 41'	Report	Velasco 50'; Delgado (yellow card) 63'; Flores 70'	Stadium: Marcelo Bielsa; Referee: Nazareno Arasa

September 2, 2026 Round of 16	Vélez Sarsfield	0–0 (3–4 p)	Boca Juniors	Córdoba
21:15 UTC−3	Pellegrini (yellow card) 40'; Aliendro (yellow card) 53'; Godoy (yellow card) 73' (penalty missed) 90+1'	Report	Herrera (yellow card) 85'; Montero (yellow card) 89'	Stadium: Mario Alberto Kempes; Referee: Sebastián Zunino
	Penalties
	Gómez (penalty missed); García (penalty scored); Escobar (penalty scored); Aliendro (penalty scored); Silvero (penalty missed)		(penalty scored) Blanco; (penalty scored) Zenón; (penalty missed) Valencia; (penalty scored) Flores; (penalty scored) Palacios

September 27, 2026 Quarterfinals	Racing	2–3	Boca Juniors	Rosario
17:00 UTC−3	Conechny (yellow card) 11'; Lodico 18'; Martínez 46'; Zaracho (yellow card) 65'	Report	Valencia 72', 80', 90+5' (yellow card) 90+6'	Stadium: Gigante de Arroyito; Referee: Andrés Gariano

November 14, 2026 Semifinals	Banfield	0–3	Boca Juniors	Mendoza
19:00 UTC−3	Balboa (yellow card) 42'; Meriano (yellow card) 50'	Report	Braida (yellow card) 44'; Ascacíbar 45+1'; Villa 63'; Lozano 73'	Stadium: Malvinas Argentinas; Referee: Nazareno Arasa

==== Final ====
December 2, 2026 Final	Boca Juniors	v	Platense
19:00 UTC−3		Report

=== Copa Libertadores ===
==== Group stage ====
Pos	Team	Pld	W	D	L	GF	GA	GD	Pts	Qualification	UCA	CRU	BOC	BSC
1	(Chile) Universidad Católica	6	4	1	1	8	4	+4	13	Advance to round of 16	—	0–0	1–2	2–0
2	(Brazil) Cruzeiro	6	3	2	1	8	3	+5	11	Advance to round of 16	1–2	—	1–0	4–0
3	(Argentina) Boca Juniors	6	2	1	3	6	5	+1	7	Transfer to Copa Sudamericana	0–1	1–1	—	3–0
4	(Ecuador) Barcelona	6	1	0	5	2	12	−10	3		1–2	0–1	1–0	—

Source: CONMEBOL

8 April 1	Universidad Católica (Chile)	1–2	(Argentina) Boca Juniors	Santiago, Chile
20:30 UTC−4	Zampedri (yellow card) 10'; Valencia (yellow card) 32'; Zuqui (yellow card) 52'; Cuevas (yellow card) 71'; Díaz 83'	Report	Paredes (yellow card) 10' (goal) 16'; Blanco (yellow card) 39'; Bareiro 65'	Stadium: Claro Arena; Referee: Gustavo Tejera (Uruguay)

15 April 2	Boca Juniors (Argentina)	3–0	(Ecuador) Barcelona	Buenos Aires, Argentina
21:00 UTC−3	Bareiro (yellow card) 1'; Di Lollo 39'; Ascacíbar 81'; Herrera 90+4'	Report	Intriago (yellow card) 7'; Quiñónez (yellow card) 52'	Stadium: La Bombonera; Referee: Wilmar Roldán (Colombia)

29 April 3	Cruzeiro (Brazil)	1–0	(Argentina) Boca Juniors	Belo Horizonte, Brazil
21:30 UTC−3	Kaio Jorge (yellow card) 25'; Fagner (yellow card) 29'; Gerson (yellow card) 40'; Villarreal 83'; Matheus Pereira (yellow card) 87'	Report	Paredes (yellow card) 7'; Bareiro (yellow card) 40' (yellow-red card) 45+1'; Blanco (yellow card) 87'; Costa (yellow card) 90'	Stadium: Mineirão; Referee: Esteban Ostojich (Uruguay)

6 May 4	Barcelona (Ecuador)	1–0	(Argentina) Boca Juniors	Guayaquil, Ecuador
19:00 UTC−5	Castillo (yellow card) 38'; Benedetto (yellow card) 45+1'; Céliz (red card) 45+6'; Carabalí (yellow card) 52'; Lugo (yellow card) 68'; Villalba 73'; Rangel (yellow card) 81'	Report	Aranda (yellow card) 10'; Ascacíbar (red card) 33'; Merentiel (yellow card) 33'; Costa (yellow card) 90'; Velasco (yellow card) 90+5'	Stadium: Estadio Monumental; Referee: Carlos Betancur (Colombia)

20 May 5	Boca Juniors (Argentina)	1–1	(Brazil) Cruzeiro	Buenos Aires, Argentina
21:30 UTC−3	Merentiel 15'; Costa (yellow card) 73'; Zeballos (yellow card) 83'	Report	Fagner (yellow card) 47' (goal) 54'; Gerson (red card) 68'; Villarreal (yellow card) 90+7'	Stadium: La Bombonera; Referee: Jesús Valenzuela (Venezuela)

27 May 6	Boca Juniors (Argentina)	0–1	(Chile) Universidad Católica	Buenos Aires, Argentina
21:30 UTC−3	Delgado (yellow card) 56'; Di Lollo (yellow card) 90+5'	Report	Montes 34'; Cuevas (yellow card) 35'; Zampedri (yellow card) 54'	Stadium: La Bombonera; Referee: Wilmar Roldán (Colombia)

=== Copa Sudamericana ===
==== Knockout round play-offs ====
July 22, 2026 First leg	Boca Juniors (Argentina)	1–0	(Chile) O'Higgins	Buenos Aires, Argentina
21:30 UTC−3	Merentiel 44'	Report	Faúndez (yellow card) 61'	Stadium: La Bombonera; Referee: Andrés Matonte (Uruguay)

July 29, 2026 Second leg	O'Higgins (Chile)	1–0 (1–1 agg.) (3–4 p)	(Argentina) Boca Juniors	Rancagua, Chile
19:00 UTC−5	González 72'; Avilés (yellow card) 83'; Faúndez (yellow card) 90+2'	Report	Lozano (yellow card) 65'; Figal (yellow card) 68'; Paredes (yellow card) 69'; Flores (yellow card) 80'	Stadium: Estadio El Teniente; Referee: Wilmar Roldán (Colombia)
	Penalties
	González (penalty scored); Castillo (penalty scored); Vecino (penalty missed); Pavez (penalty missed); Brizuela (penalty scored)		(penalty scored) Paredes; (penalty scored) Merentiel; (penalty scored) Figal; (penalty missed) Aranda; (penalty scored) Blanco

==== Round of 16 ====
August 11, 2026 First leg	Boca Juniors (Argentina)	3–1	(Paraguay) Recoleta	Buenos Aires, Argentina
19:00 UTC−3	Ascacíbar 49'; Delgado 51'; Costa (yellow card) 59'; Flores 62'	Report	Rios 5'; Franco (yellow card) 33'; Báez (red card) 45+2'; Mosquera (yellow card) 60' (yellow-red card) 69'	Stadium: Estadio Tomás Adolfo Ducó; Referee: Piero Maza (Chile)

August 18, 2026 Second leg	Recoleta (Paraguay)	0–4 (1–7 agg.)	(Argentina) Boca Juniors	Asunción, Paraguay
19:00 UTC−3	Domínguez (yellow card) 50'; Ferreira (yellow card) 33'	Report	Ascacíbar 30'; Villa 43'; Merentiel 52'; Velasco 77'	Stadium: Estadio Defensores del Chaco; Referee: Andrés Matonte (Uruguay)

==== Quarter-finals ====
September 8, 2026 First leg	Boca Juniors (Argentina)	1–0	(Brazil) São Paulo	Buenos Aires, Argentina
21:30 UTC−3	Merentiel 52'; Valencia (yellow card) 90+4'	Report	Calleri (yellow card) 70'	Stadium: La Bombonera; Referee: Piero Maza (Chile)

September 15, 2026 Second leg	São Paulo (Brazil)	1–1 (1–2 agg.)	(Argentina) Boca Juniors	São Paulo, Brazil
21:30 UTC−3	Djhordney (yellow card) 49'; Domingos Duarte 89'; Artur (yellow card) 90+4'	Report	Lozano 60'; Romero (yellow card) 90+3'	Stadium: Estádio do Morumbi; Referee: Gustavo Tejera (Uruguay)

==== Semi-finals ====
October 13, 2026 First leg	Boca Juniors (Argentina)	0–1	(Brazil) Vasco da Gama	Buenos Aires, Argentina
21:30 UTC−3	Delgado (yellow card) 8'	Report	Adson 25' (yellow card) 44'; Sosa (yellow card) 51'; Gómez (yellow card) 63' (yellow-red card) 64'	Stadium: La Bombonera; Referee: Piero Maza (Chile)

October 20, 2026 Second leg	Vasco da Gama (Brazil)	1–3 (2–3 agg.)	(Argentina) Boca Juniors	Rio de Janeiro, Brazil
21:30 UTC−3	Mendes (yellow card) 40'; Rodríguez 66'	Report	Di Lollo 4'; Merentiel 34'; Paredes (yellow card) 37' (goal) 88'; Velasco (yellow card) 90+2'	Stadium: Maracanã Stadium; Referee: Jesús Valenzuela (Venezuela)

==== Final ====
November 21, 2026 Final	Atlético Mineiro (Brazil)	0–2	(Argentina) Boca Juniors	Barranquilla, Colombia
17:30 UTC−5	Tressoldi (yellow card) 45'; Bernard (yellow card) 56'; Fred (yellow card) 84'	Report	Ascacíbar 16'; Merentiel 48'; Belmonte (yellow card) 78'	Stadium: Estadio Metropolitano Roberto Meléndez; Referee: Andrés Matonte (Uruguay)

== Team statistics ==
	Total	Home	Away	Neutral
Games played	53	24	23	6
Games won	29	14	10	5
Games drawn	15	7	7	1
Games lost	9	3	6	
Biggest win	4–0 vs Defensa y Justicia	3–0 vs Barcelona	4–0 vs Defensa y Justicia	3–0 vs Banfield
Biggest loss	0–3 vs Deportivo Riestra	2–3 vs Huracán	0–3 vs Deportivo Riestra	
Biggest win (Torneo Apertura)	4–0 vs Defensa y Justicia	2–0 vs Newell's Old Boys	4–0 vs Defensa y Justicia	None
Biggest win (Torneo Clausura)	3–0 vs Unión	3–0 vs Unión	2–0 vs San Lorenzo	
Biggest win (Copa Argentina)	3–0 vs Banfield	None		3–0 vs Banfield
Biggest win (Copa Libertadores)	3–0 vs Barcelona	3–0 vs Barcelona	2–0 vs Universidad Católica	None
Biggest win (Copa Sudamericana)	4–0 vs Recoleta	3–1 vs Recoleta	4–0 vs Recoleta	2–0 vs Atlético Mineiro
Biggest loss (Torneo Apertura)	1–2 vs Estudiantes (LP)		1–2 vs Estudiantes (LP)	
Biggest loss (Torneo Clausura)	0–3 vs Deportivo Riestra		0–3 vs Deportivo Riestra	
Biggest loss (Copa Argentina)		None		
Biggest loss (Copa Libertadores)	0–1 vs Cruzeiro	0–1 vs Universidad Católica	0–1 vs Cruzeiro	None
Biggest loss (Copa Sudamericana)	0–1 vs O'Higgins	0–1 vs Vasco da Gama	0–1 vs O'Higgins	None
Clean sheets	25	13	7	5
Goals scored	79	32	35	12
Goals conceded	38	11	24	2
Goal difference	+41	+21	+11	+10
Yellow cards	104	39	58	7
Red cards	2		2	
Top scorer	Merentiel (15)	Merentiel (5)	Merentiel (10)	Valencia (3)
Penalties for	3	2	1	
Penalties against	2	2		

=== Appearances and goals ===
As of November 21, 2026

No.	Pos	Nat	Player	Total		Torneo Apertura		Torneo Clausura		Copa Argentina		Copa Libertadores		Copa Sudamericana	
No.	Pos	Nat	Player	Apps	Goals	Apps	Goals	Apps	Goals	Apps	Goals	Apps	Goals	Apps	Goals
Goalkeepers
1	GK	(Colombia) COL	Álvaro Montero	25	-17	0	0	14	-12	2	0	0	0	9	-5
12	GK	(Argentina) ARG	Leandro Brey	16	-11	5+1	-4	2	-1	2	-2	5+1	-4	0	0
30	GK	(Argentina) ARG	Javier García	2	-1	0	0	0	0	1	0	0+1	-1	0	0
-	GK	(Argentina) ARG	Agustín Marchesín	13	-8	12	-8	0	0	0	0	1	0	0	0
Defenders
2	DF	(Argentina) ARG	Lautaro Di Lollo	42	5	13	1	13+1	2	3	0	6	1	6	1
3	DF	(Argentina) ARG	Lautaro Blanco	47	1	13+1	1	14+1	0	3	0	6	0	9	0
4	DF	(Argentina) ARG	Nicolás Figal	13	0	4	0	3	0	2	0	0+1	0	3	0
17	DF	(Uruguay) URU	Leandro Lozano	22	3	0	0	10+1	1	4	1	0	0	7	1
24	DF	(Argentina) ARG	Dylan Gorosito	10	0	0	0	5+2	0	0+1	0	0	0	2	0
26	DF	(Argentina) ARG	Marco Pellegrino	17	0	4	0	6+2	0	1+1	0	1+1	0	0+1	0
32	DF	(Argentina) ARG	Ayrton Costa	32	0	13	0	5+2	0	1+1	0	5	0	4+1	0
42	DF	(Argentina) ARG	Facundo Herrera	17	1	0	0	6+2	1	3	0	0	0	5+1	0
46	DF	(Argentina) ARG	Matías Satas	2	0	0	0	1+1	0	0	0	0	0	0	0
Midfielders
5	MF	(Argentina) ARG	Leandro Paredes	42	4	11+4	2	9+2	0	3	0	6	1	6+1	1
6	MF	(Argentina) ARG	Rodrigo Battaglia	3	0	0	0	1	0	0	0	0	0	1+1	0
7	MF	(Chile) CHI	Carlos Palacios	12	0	0	0	2+6	0	0+3	0	0	0	1	0
8	MF	(Argentina) ARG	Tomás Belmonte	26	1	7+3	0	2+5	1	3+1	0	1	0	2+2	0
10	MF	(Argentina) ARG	Tomás Aranda	35	1	7+7	1	5+2	0	1+2	0	6	0	5	0
15	MF	(Chile) CHI	Williams Alarcón	13	0	5	0	3+2	0	1+1	0	0	0	1	0
18	MF	(Argentina) ARG	Milton Delgado	46	1	11+5	0	12	0	4	0	6	0	8	1
23	MF	(Argentina) ARG	Camilo Rey Domenech	8	0	1+1	0	3+2	0	0	0	0	0	0+1	0
25	MF	(Argentina) ARG	Santiago Ascacíbar	46	10	10+3	2	13+2	3	4+1	1	4	1	8+1	3
27	MF	(Argentina) ARG	Malcom Braida	14	0	4+2	0	3	0	2	0	2	0	0+1	0
Forwards
9	FW	(Argentina) ARG	Milton Giménez	12	4	3+3	4	0+2	0	0	0	3+1	0	0	0
11	FW	(Paraguay) PAR	Ángel Romero	23	4	4+5	1	2+4	3	1+1	0	0+3	0	0+3	0
13	FW	(Argentina) ARG	Enner Valencia	19	6	0	0	3+7	3	0+3	3	0	0	1+5	0
16	FW	(Uruguay) URU	Miguel Merentiel	48	16	11+3	5	11+3	5	4+1	0	5+1	1	8+1	5
19	FW	(Argentina) ARG	Leonel Flores	27	5	0	0	13+2	3	2+2	1	0	0	6+2	1
20	FW	(Argentina) ARG	Alan Velasco	32	6	4+2	2	8+5	2	3+1	1	0+3	0	2+4	1
22	FW	(Colombia) COL	Sebastián Villa	26	2	0	0	7+7	0	2+1	1	0	0	6+3	1
28	FW	(Paraguay) PAR	Adam Bareiro	14	6	8+2	3	0	0	1	2	3	1	0	0
44	FW	(Argentina) ARG	Rodrigo Bacidalupe	2	0	0	0	0+2	0	0	0	0	0	0	0
Players who have made an appearance or had a squad number this season, but have left the club
17	DF	(Argentina) ARG	Lucas Blondel	0	0	0	0	0	0	0	0	0	0	0	0
24	DF	(Argentina) ARG	Juan Barinaga	10	0	9	0	0	0	0	0	0+1	0	0	0
19	MF	(Argentina) ARG	Agustín Martegani	0	0	0	0	0	0	0	0	0	0	0	0
21	MF	(Spain) ESP	Ander Herrera	12	1	5+4	0	0	0	0	0	1+2	1	0	0
21	MF	(Argentina) ARG	Kevin Zenón	13	1	2+2	0	2+2	1	0+2	0	0	0	0+3	0
7	FW	(Argentina) ARG	Exequiel Zeballos	13	1	5+3	1	0	0	0	0	1+4	0	0	0
10	FW	(Uruguay) URU	Edinson Cavani	2	0	1+1	0	0	0	0	0	0	0	0	0
11	FW	(Argentina) ARG	Lucas Janson	4	0	3	0	0	0	1	0	0	0	0	0
33	FW	(Argentina) ARG	Brian Aguirre	1	0	0+1	0	0	0	0	0	0	0	0	0
37	FW	(Argentina) ARG	Gonzalo Gelini	5	0	2+3	0	0	0	0	0	0	0	0	0
41	FW	(Argentina) ARG	Iker Zufiaurre	10	1	2+7	1	0	0	0+1	0	0	0	0	0

=== Top scorers ===
As of November 21, 2026

Rank	Pos.	No.	Player	Torneo Apertura	Torneo Clausura	Copa Argentina	Copa Libertadores	Copa Sudamericana	Total
1	FW	16	(Uruguay) Miguel Merentiel	5	5		1	5	16
2	MF	25	(Argentina) Santiago Ascacíbar	2	3	1	1	3	10
3	FW	28	(Paraguay) Adam Bareiro	3		2	1		6
4	FW	20	(Argentina) Alan Velasco	2	2	1		1	6
5	FW	13	(Ecuador) Enner Valencia		3	3			6
6	FW	19	(Argentina) Leonel Flores		3	1		1	5
7	DF	2	(Argentina) Lautaro Di Lollo	1	2		1	1	5
8	FW	9	(Argentina) Milton Giménez	4					4
9	FW	11	(Paraguay) Ángel Romero	1	2				3
11	MF	5	(Argentina) Leandro Paredes	2				1	3
11	DF	17	(Uruguay) Leandro Lozano		1	1		1	3
12	FW	22	(Colombia) Sebastián Villa			1		1	2
13	FW	7	(Argentina) Exequiel Zeballos	1					1
14	DF	3	(Argentina) Lautaro Blanco	1					1
15	FW	41	(Argentina) Iker Zufiaurre	1					1
16	MF	12	(Argentina) Tomás Aranda	1					1
17	MF	21	(Spain) Ander Herrera				1		1
18	MF	18	(Argentina) Milton Delgado					1	1
19	MF	8	(Argentina) Tomás Belmonte		1				1
20	DF	42	(Argentina) Facundo Herrera		1				1
Own goals									
Totals				24	24	10	6	15	79

=== Top assists ===
As of November 21, 2026

Rank	Pos.	No.	Player	Torneo Apertura	Torneo Clausura	Copa Argentina	Copa Libertadores	Copa Sudamericana	Total
1	DF	3	(Argentina) Lautaro Blanco	1	4	2	3	1	11
2	FW	22	(Colombia) Sebastián Villa		3	2		4	9
3	MF	5	(Argentina) Leandro Paredes	3	1	1	1	1	7
4	MF	18	(Argentina) Milton Delgado	1	1	2		2	6
5	MF	10	(Argentina) Tomás Aranda	2	1				3
6	FW	7	(Argentina) Exequiel Zeballos	3					3
7	FW	16	(Uruguay) Miguel Merentiel	2				1	3
8	FW	19	(Argentina) Leonel Flores		2			1	3
9	FW	20	(Argentina) Alan Velasco	1			1		2
10	MF	25	(Argentina) Santiago Ascacíbar		2				2
11	FW	13	(Ecuador) Enner Valencia		2				2
12	DF	24	(Argentina) Dylan Gorosito		2				2
13	MF	7	(Chile) Carlos Palacios		1	1			2
14	FW	28	(Paraguay) Adam Bareiro	1					1
15	FW	37	(Argentina) Gonzalo Gelini	1					1
16	FW	11	(Argentina) Lucas Janson			1			1
17	DF	26	(Argentina) Marco Pellegrino			1			1
18	MF	15	(Chile) Williams Alarcón	1					1
19	MF	21	(Argentina) Kevin Zenón					1	1
20	DF	2	(Argentina) Lautaro Di Lollo		1				1
Totals				16	20	10	5	11	62

=== Clean sheets ===
As of November 21, 2026

Rank	Pos.	No.	Player	Torneo Apertura	Torneo Clausura	Copa Argentina	Copa Libertadores	Copa Sudamericana	Total
1	GK	1	(Colombia) Álvaro Montero		6	2		4	12
2	GK	12	(Argentina) Leandro Brey	3	1	2	1		7
3	GK	1	(Argentina) Agustín Marchesín	6					6
Totals				9	6	4	1	3	23

=== Penalties ===
Date	Penalty Taker	Scored	Opponent	Competition
1 February	Leandro Paredes	Yes	Newell's Old Boys	Torneo Apertura
11 April	Milton Giménez	Yes	Independiente	Torneo Apertura
19 April	Leandro Paredes	Yes	River Plate	Torneo Apertura

=== Disciplinary record ===
As of November 21, 2026

No.	Pos	Nat	Player	Torneo Apertura			Torneo Clausura			Copa Argentina			Copa Libertadores			Copa Sudamericana			Total		
No.	Pos	Nat	Player	Yellow card	(yellow card) (yellow-red card)	Red card	Yellow card	(yellow card) (yellow-red card)	Red card	Yellow card	(yellow card) (yellow-red card)	Red card	Yellow card	(yellow card) (yellow-red card)	Red card	Yellow card	(yellow card) (yellow-red card)	Red card	Yellow card	(yellow card) (yellow-red card)	Red card
Goalkeepers
1	GK	(Argentina)	Álvaro Montero							1									1		
12	GK	(Argentina)	Leandro Brey																		
30	GK	(Argentina)	Javier García																		
	GK	(Argentina)	Agustín Marchesín																		
Defenders
2	DF	(Argentina)	Lautaro Di Lollo	3			3						1						7		
3	DF	(Argentina)	Lautaro Blanco				3						2						5		
4	DF	(Argentina)	Nicolás Figal				1									1			2		
17	DF	(Uruguay)	Leandro Lozano				1									1			2		
24	DF	(Argentina)	Dylan Gorosito				1												1		
26	DF	(Argentina)	Marco Pellegrino				1												1		
32	DF	(Argentina)	Ayrton Costa	2			4						3			1			10		
42	DF	(Argentina)	Facundo Herrera				4			1									5		
46	DF	(Argentina)	Matías Satas																		
Midfielders
5	MF	(Argentina)	Leandro Paredes	7			4						2			2			15		
6	MF	(Argentina)	Rodrigo Battaglia																		
7	MF	(Chile)	Carlos Palacios				1												1		
8	MF	(Argentina)	Tomás Belmonte	2			2									1			5		
10	MF	(Argentina)	Tomás Aranda	2									1						3		
15	MF	(Chile)	Williams Alarcón	1			1												2		
18	MF	(Argentina)	Milton Delgado	3			4			2			1			1			11		
23	MF	(Argentina)	Camilo Rey Domenech																		
25	MF	(Argentina)	Santiago Ascacíbar	3			2								1				5		1
27	MF	(Argentina)	Malcom Braida				2			1									3		
Forwards
9	FW	(Argentina)	Milton Giménez	1															1		
11	FW	(Paraguay)	Ángel Romero													1			1		
13	FW	(Ecuador)	Enner Valencia				1			1						1			3		
16	FW	(Uruguay)	Miguel Merentiel	1									1						2		
19	FW	(Argentina)	Leonel Flores				2									1			3		
20	FW	(Argentina)	Alan Velasco				2						1			1			4		
22	FW	(Colombia)	Sebastián Villa																		
28	FW	(Paraguay)	Adam Bareiro	4									1	1					5	1	
Players who have made an appearance or had a squad number this season, but have left the club
17	DF	(Argentina)	Lucas Blondel																		
	DF	(Argentina)	Juan Barinaga	1															1		
19	MF	(Argentina)	Agustín Martegani																		
21	MF	(Spain)	Ander Herrera	1															1		
21	MF	(Argentina)	Kevin Zenón				1												1		
7	FW	(Argentina)	Exequiel Zeballos										1						1		
10	FW	(Uruguay)	Edinson Cavani																		
11	FW	(Argentina)	Lucas Janson	1															1		
33	FW	(Argentina)	Brian Aguirre																		
37	FW	(Argentina)	Gonzalo Gelini																		
41	FW	(Argentina)	Iker Zufiaurre	1															1		
Total				33			40			6			14	1	1	11			104	1	1
