= 2026 Copa Sudamericana final =

Final match of the 24th Copa Sudamericana edition

- The Estadio Metropolitano Roberto Meléndez in Barranquilla hosted the match
- Event: 2026 Copa Sudamericana
Atlético Mineiro	Boca Juniors
(Brazil)	(Argentina)
0	2
- Date: 21 November 2026
- Venue: Estadio Metropolitano Roberto Meléndez, Barranquilla
- Man of the Match: Sebastián Villa (Boca Juniors)
- Referee: Andrés Matonte (Uruguay)

The 2026 Copa Sudamericana final was the final match which decided the winner of the 2026 Copa Sudamericana. This was the 25th edition of the Copa Sudamericana, the second-tier South American continental club football tournament organized by CONMEBOL.

The match was played by Brazilian club Atlético Mineiro and Argentine side Boca Juniors on 21 November 2026 at the Estadio Metropolitano Roberto Meléndez in Barranquilla, Colombia.

Boca Juniors defeated Atlético Mineiro 2–0 in the match to claim their third Copa Sudamericana title. As winners of the Copa Sudamericana, they earned the right to play against the winners of the 2026 Copa Libertadores in the 2027 Recopa Sudamericana and they also automatically qualified for the 2027 Copa Libertadores group stage.

== Venue ==
On 28 November 2025, ahead of the 2025 Copa Libertadores final in Lima, the city of Barranquilla was appointed by the CONMEBOL Council as the host for the final—marking the first time that Colombia has hosted a single-match final since 2019, when the single-match format was introduced for deciding continental tournament titles. Nonetheless, the city's Estadio Metropolitano Roberto Meléndez had previously hosted the first leg of the 2018 Copa Sudamericana finals, played by Junior and Atlético Paranaense.

Following the awarding of the venue, in December 2025 it was announced that Estadio Metropolitano Roberto Meléndez would be temporarily closed for remodeling works aiming to expand its capacity to 65,000 spectators. The works, which began in January 2026 and were completed in the days leading up to the final, involved the removal of the athletics track and the lowering of the playing field by about four meters, which would allow to bring the stands closer to the field, the change of surface from natural to hybrid grass, the expansion of the bathrooms and the construction of new VIP spaces, press rooms and hospitality zones, with an investment of over USD 45 million and the backing and supervision of CONMEBOL.

== Teams ==
This was the second Copa Sudamericana final played by Atlético Mineiro, as well as the second in a row since the Brazilian club also reached the decisive match of the previous edition, in which they lost to Argentine side Lanús on penalty kicks. On the other hand, this was the third appearance in a Copa Sudamericana final for Boca Juniors, who also played the Copa Sudamericana finals consecutively in 2004 and 2005, winning the title against Bolívar and Pumas UNAM, respectively.

Prior to this match, Atlético Mineiro and Boca Juniors played each other in international competition eight times, with three wins for the Argentine team, one for the Brazilians, and four draws. They faced each other in the 1978 Copa Libertadores semifinals and the 1993 Copa de Oro final, both of which were won by Boca Juniors, the 2000 Copa Mercosur quarter-finals in which Atlético Minero knocked the Argentine side out after winning one match and drawing the other, and the 2021 Copa Libertadores round of 16, where the Brazilian side advanced to the next stage of the competition on penalties following two scoreless draws in the series.

Team	Previous finals appearances (bold indicates winners)
(Brazil) Atlético Mineiro	1 (2025)
(Argentina) Boca Juniors	2 (**2004**, **2005**)

== Road to the final ==
Note: In all scores below, the score of the home team is given first.

(Brazil) Atlético Mineiro			Round	(Argentina) Boca Juniors		
Opponent	Venue	Score		Opponent	Venue	Score
Bye			First stage	Qualified for Copa Libertadores		
Group B (Copa Sudamericana)			Group stage	Group D (Copa Libertadores)		
(Venezuela) Academia Puerto Cabello	Away	2–1	Group stage	(Chile) Universidad Católica	Away	1–2
(Uruguay) Juventud	Home	2–1	Group stage	(Ecuador) Barcelona	Home	3–0
(Peru) Cienciano	Away	1–0	Group stage	(Brazil) Cruzeiro	Away	1–0
(Uruguay) Juventud	Away	2–2	Group stage	(Ecuador) Barcelona	Away	1–0
(Peru) Cienciano	Home	2–0	Group stage	(Brazil) Cruzeiro	Home	1–1
(Venezuela) Academia Puerto Cabello	Home	1–0	Group stage	(Chile) Universidad Católica	Home	0–1
Pos / Team / Pld / Pts; 1 / (Brazil) Atlético Mineiro / 6 / 10; 2 / (Peru) Cienciano / 6 / 8; 3 / (Uruguay) Juventud / 6 / 7; 4 / (Venezuela) Academia Puerto Cabello / 6 / 7; Source: CONMEBOL			Group stage	Pos / Team / Pld / Pts; 1 / (Chile) Universidad Católica / 6 / 13; 2 / (Brazil) Cruzeiro / 6 / 11; 3 / (Argentina) Boca Juniors / 6 / 7; 4 / (Ecuador) Barcelona / 6 / 3; Source: CONMEBOL		
Seed 7			Final stages	Seed 21		
Bye			Knockout round play-offs	(Chile) O'Higgins (tied 1–1 on aggregate, won on penalties)	Home	1–0
Bye			Knockout round play-offs	(Chile) O'Higgins (tied 1–1 on aggregate, won on penalties)	Away	1–0 (4–3 p)
(Brazil) Red Bull Bragantino (won 3–2 on aggregate)	Away	0–1	Round of 16	(Paraguay) Recoleta (won 7–1 on aggregate)	Home	3–1
(Brazil) Red Bull Bragantino (won 3–2 on aggregate)	Home	2–2	Round of 16	(Paraguay) Recoleta (won 7–1 on aggregate)	Away	0–4
(Brazil) Santos (tied 4–4 on aggregate, won on penalties)	Away	2–0	Quarter-finals	(Brazil) São Paulo (won 2–1 on aggregate)	Home	1–0
(Brazil) Santos (tied 4–4 on aggregate, won on penalties)	Home	4–2 (3–1 p)	Quarter-finals	(Brazil) São Paulo (won 2–1 on aggregate)	Away	1–1
(Uruguay) Montevideo City Torque (won 3–2 on aggregate)	Home	3–0	Semi-finals	(Brazil) Vasco da Gama (won 3–2 on aggregate)	Home	0–1
(Uruguay) Montevideo City Torque (won 3–2 on aggregate)	Away	2–0	Semi-finals	(Brazil) Vasco da Gama (won 3–2 on aggregate)	Away	1–3

== Format ==
The final was played as a single match at a pre-selected venue, with the higher-seeded team designated as the "home" team for administrative purposes. If scores were level after full time, 30 minutes of extra time would be played. If still tied after extra time, a penalty shoot-out would be used to determine the winners.

== Match ==
Reinier, Alan Minda and Maycon (Atlético Mineiro) and Agustín Marchesín (Boca Juniors) missed the final due to injuries, while Alan Franco (Atlético Mineiro) also missed it due to suspension.

=== Summary ===
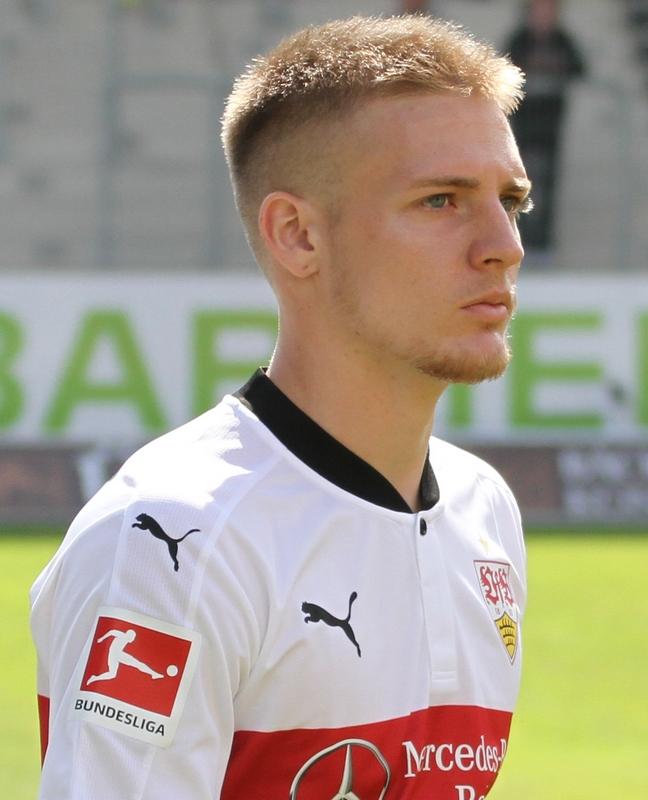
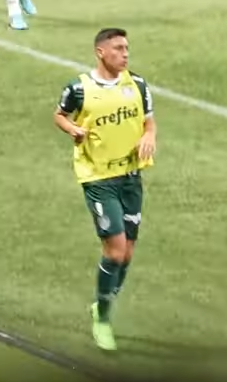
Santiago Ascacíbar (left) and Miguel Merentiel scored for Boca Juniors

Boca Juniors had the first chance to score in the third minute when Sebastián Villa crossed the ball from the left; goalkeeper Everson caught the ball but it slipped from his hands, which was capitalised by Uruguayan forward Miguel Merentiel but his shot hit the crossbar. In the 12th minute, a goal by Santiago Ascacíbar was not conceded due to an offside position. Nevertheless, three minutes later the midfielder had another chance when he caught a rebound in Atlético Mineiro's penalty area after a shot by Tomás Aranda, scoring the first goal for Boca Juniors.

Near the end of the first half, Lautaro Blanco crossed the ball to Lautaro Di Lollo, who headed to score but goalkeeper Everson saved his goal.

Atlético Mineiro manager Eduardo Domínguez made three substitutions for the second half, they were Thiago Borbas, Ángelo Preciado, and Igor Gomes who replaced Kauã Pascini, Mamady Cissé, and Natanael, respectively. However Boca Juniors did not allow their opponents' reaction since in the 48th minute Villa made a run on the left, overcoming Preciado's efforts to stop him and sending a cross to Merentiel, who pushed the ball in Mineiro's goal area to widen the gap to 2–0 in favor of Boca Juniors.

The Brazilian side went desperately to narrow the gap, as Bernard attempted a volley shot that passed near the Boca Juniors' left post, and soon after, a header by Vitão was saved by goalkeeper Álvaro Montero. Faced with the onslaught from Atlético Mineiro, Boca Juniors manager Rodolfo Arruabarrena sent Enner Valencia, Rodrigo Battaglia, and Leonel Flores to the pitch to bring a breath of fresh air to his team. Since then, Boca Juniors dominated the actions, taking advantage of their opponent's nerves and anxiety. The Argentine team had more opportunities to score a third goal such as a shot by Blanco with five minutes remaining, nevertheless the score remained the same thus allowing Boca Juniors to claim their third Copa Sudamericana title.

=== Details ===
21 November 2026
17:30 UTC−5

Atlético Mineiro (Brazil)	0–2	(Argentina) Boca Juniors
	Report	Ascacíbar 16'; Merentiel 48'

Estadio Metropolitano Roberto Meléndez, Barranquilla
Referee: Andrés Matonte (Uruguay)

Atlético Mineiro	Boca Juniors

GK	22	(Brazil) Everson (c)
RB	2	(Brazil) Natanael		(substituted off) 46'
CB	4	(Brazil) Ruan Tressoldi	(yellow card) 45'
CB	40	(Brazil) Vitão
LB	6	(Brazil) Renan Lodi		(substituted off) 78'
DM	15	(Colombia) Kevin Castaño		(substituted off) 83'
DM	39	(Guinea) Mamady Cissé		(substituted off) 46'
RW	28	(Argentina) Tomás Cuello
AM	7	(Brazil) Fred	(yellow card) 84'
LW	36	(Brazil) Kauã Pascini		(substituted off) 46'
CF	11	(Brazil) Bernard	(yellow card) 56'
Substitutes:
GK	1	(Brazil) Gabriel Delfim
DF	3	(Brazil) Léo Duarte
DF	14	(Brazil) Vitor Hugo
DF	23	(Ecuador) Ángelo Preciado		(substituted on) 46'
MF	5	(Brazil) Alexsander
MF	10	(Brazil) Gustavo Scarpa		(substituted on) 78'
MF	17	(Brazil) Igor Gomes		(substituted on) 46'
MF	25	(Argentina) Tomás Pérez
MF	30	(Brazil) Victor Hugo
FW	9	(Colombia) Mateo Cassierra		(substituted on) 83'
FW	18	(Uruguay) Thiago Borbas		(substituted on) 46'
FW	92	(Brazil) Dudu
Manager:
(Argentina) Eduardo Domínguez

GK	1	(Colombia) Álvaro Montero
LB	17	(Uruguay) Leandro Lozano
CB	2	(Argentina) Lautaro Di Lollo
CB	42	(Argentina) Facundo Herrera
LB	3	(Argentina) Lautaro Blanco
RM	25	(Argentina) Santiago Ascacíbar		(substituted off) 77'
CM	5	(Argentina) Leandro Paredes (c)		(substituted off) 58'
LM	18	(Argentina) Milton Delgado
RW	10	(Argentina) Tomás Aranda		(substituted off) 64'
CF	16	(Uruguay) Miguel Merentiel		(substituted off) 64'
LW	22	(Colombia) Sebastián Villa		(substituted off) 77'
Substitutes:
GK	12	(Argentina) Leandro Brey
DF	4	(Argentina) Nicolás Figal
DF	27	(Argentina) Malcom Braida
DF	32	(Argentina) Ayrton Costa
MF	6	(Argentina) Rodrigo Battaglia		(substituted on) 77'
MF	7	(Chile) Carlos Palacios
MF	8	(Argentina) Tomás Belmonte	(yellow card) 78'	(substituted on) 58'
MF	15	(Chile) Williams Alarcón
MF	20	(Argentina) Alan Velasco		(substituted on) 64'
FW	19	(Argentina) Leonel Flores		(substituted on) 77'
FW	28	(Paraguay) Adam Bareiro
FW	30	(Ecuador) Enner Valencia		(substituted on) 64'
Manager:
(Argentina) Rodolfo Arruabarrena

Man of the Match:
Sebastián Villa (Boca Juniors)

Assistant referees:
Nicolás Tarán (Uruguay)
Andrés Nievas (Uruguay)
Fourth official:
Juan Gabriel Benítez (Paraguay)
Fifth official:
Milciades Saldívar (Paraguay)
Video assistant referee:
Antonio García (Uruguay)
Assistant video assistant referees:
Ulises Mereles (Paraguay)
Agustín Berisso (Uruguay)
Leodán González (Uruguay)

Match rules
- 90 minutes.
- 30 minutes of extra time if necessary.
- Penalty shoot-out if scores still level.
- Twelve named substitutes.
- Maximum of five substitutions, with a sixth allowed in extra time.

== Aftermath ==
"Mineiro was no match for Boca Juniors", according to Brazilian portal OGol

The performance of Atlético Mineiro was harshly criticized by the Brazilian media, stating that the team had not been a match for Boca Juniors.

Folha de São Paulo titled "Atlético Mineiro suffer second consecutive runner-up finish" referring to the second consecutive final lost by the Galo. The newspaper focused on the finals by lost by Atlético Mineiro in the last years, listing each one of them (2024 Copa Libertadores final, 2025 Copa Sudamericana final, and the 2026 Campeonato Mineiro final (lost to Cruzeiro)

O Globo's analysis was also based on the recent Mineiro defeats, also stating that the team was even considered favorite by some journalists. The newspaper contrasted the decreasing performance of Mineiro with the upper level showed by Boca Juniors during the match, highlighting the confidence of their players.

According to daily sports newspaper Lance!, the substitutions made by Eduardo Domínguez did not change the actions substantially for Atlético Mineiro to be able to revert Boca Juniors' dominance.

On the other hand, UOL focused on Boca Juniors' recent title-winning streak, pointing out that the Argentine team had also won the Campeón de Liga domestic title in the days leading up to the Copa Sudamericana final and still had the chance to win more domestic silverware while breaking a 18-year drought of international titles with the outcome of this match.

== See also ==
- 2026 Copa Libertadores final
- 2027 Recopa Sudamericana
