= Gorosito =

Gorosito is a surname. Notable people with the surname include:

- Dylan Gorosito (born 2006), Argentine footballer
- Néstor Gorosito (born 1964), Argentine football manager and former player
- Nicolás Gorosito (born 1988), Argentine footballer
