= Leonel Flores =

Argentine footballer (born 2007)

Personal information
- Full name: Leonel Benjamín Flores
- Date of birth: 6 February 2007 (age 19)
- Place of birth: Béccar, San Isidro, Buenos Aires Province, Argentina
- Height: 1.75 m (5 ft 9 in)
- Position: Forward

Team information
- Current team: Boca Juniors
- Number: 19

Youth career
- El Zorzal
- Ballester Centro
- Barrufaldi
- 2014–2026: Boca Juniors

Senior career*
Years	Team	Apps	(Gls)
2026–	Boca Juniors	12	(3)

International career
2026–	Argentina	3	(0)
- * Club domestic league appearances and goals

Leonel Benjamín Flores (born 6 February 2007) is an Argentine professional association football player who plays as a right winger for Argentine Primera División club Boca Juniors and the Argentina national team.

== Early career ==
Flores grew up in Villa La Cava, a working-class neighborhood in Béccar, in San Isidro Partido. He began playing baby football at the age of five at the El Zorzal community club in General Pacheco, where he was coached by Cristian Benítez, a family friend. Throughout his childhood, his family, teammates, and coaches at El Zorzal commonly called him by his middle name, "Benja".

At the same time, he played for Ballester Centro in the San Martín league. Later, he moved to Barrufaldi (Bella Vista), where he was teammates with Tomás Aranda and won the championship in his last year.

== Club career ==
=== Boca Juniors ===
In 2013, he took part in a trial on the old synthetic pitch at the Casa Amarilla complex, where he was scouted by Diego Mazzilli, Horacio García, Hugo Perrotti, and Carlos "Muñeco" Madurga. The following year, at the age of seven, he formally joined Boca Juniors' youth academy..

On September 10, 2024, he signed his first professional contract with Boca Juniors. His contract with the club was later extended until 2029. During 2025, he established himself in the reserve squad coached by Mariano Herrón. In the Torneo Proyección Apertura, he scored eight goals and, along with Valentino Simoni, was one of Boca's top scorers in the tournament.

With the return of Rodolfo Arruabarrena as coach, Flores completed his first full preseason with the professional squad and was a starter in friendly matches prior to the start of the second half of the season.

His official debut came on July 16, 2026, when he started against Sarmiento de Junín in the round of 32 of the 2026 Copa Argentina. Boca won 2-0 and Flores scored the second goal in the second half.

== International career ==
In June 2025, he was called up by Diego Placente to a training cycle with the Argentina national U20 team as part of the preparation for the 2025 FIFA U-20 World Cup.

On 30 September 2026, Flores made his debut with the Argentina national team in a 4–0 friendly win against Bolivia.

== Style of play ==
Flores has mentioned Lionel Messi and Juan Román Riquelme among his main footballing role models. To specifically work on one-on-one situations, he has indicated that he observes players like Exequiel Zeballos, Jérémy Doku, and Jamal Musiala.

== Nickname ==
Among Boca Juniors fans, the nickname "El Amigo" (The Friend) began circulating informally after an Instagram post linked to the family of Tomás Aranda. In it, Verónica Aranda (Aranda's aunt) responded to a comparison with rivals River Plate player Franco Mastantuono with the phrase "you'll see [...] when this star and his friend Flores play." The comment was later picked up and shared by fan accounts when both young players began to be part of the first team.

== Honours ==
Boca Juniors

- Copa Sudamericana: 2026
- Argentine Primera División: 2026 Liga
