= Tomás Belmonte =

Argentine footballer (born 1998)

Personal information
- Full name: Tomás Belmonte
- Date of birth: 27 May 1998 (age 28)
- Place of birth: Lanús, Argentina
- Height: 1.78 m (5 ft 10 in)
- Position: Midfielder

Team information
- Current team: Boca Juniors
- Number: 8

Youth career
- Lanús

Senior career*
Years	Team	Apps	(Gls)
2017–2023	Lanús	138	(9)
2023–2024	Toluca	29	(2)
2024–	Boca Juniors	47	(1)

International career
2017–2021	Argentina U20	4	(0)
2021	Argentina U23	5	(1)
- * Club domestic league appearances and goals as of 17:32, 16 June 2026 (UTC)

Tomás Belmonte (born 27 May 1998) is an Argentine professional footballer who plays as a midfielder for Primera División club Boca Juniors.

== Career ==
Belmonte's career got underway with Lanús, his local team. Manager Ezequiel Carboni promoted Belmonte into the club's senior squad midway through the 2017–18 Argentine Primera División campaign, awarding him his professional debut during a league encounter with Patronato on 27 January 2018; having selected him as an unused substitute for fixtures with Huracán and Defensa y Justicia in the months prior. He scored his first senior goal in Lanús' 2018–19 opener, netting against Defensa y Justicia on 12 August in a 2–2 draw.

On 25 July 2023, Belmonte joined Mexican club Toluca, where he played until June 2024, when he was transferred to Boca Juniors, returning to Argentine football.

== International ==
Belmonte represented Argentina at U20 level, being selected for 2017 South American U-20 Championship in Ecuador and the subsequent 2017 FIFA U-20 World Cup in South Korea. He failed to feature in South Korea, but did play in four fixtures for his nation in Ecuador as they finished fourth.

== Career statistics ==
As of 10 March 2026.

Appearances and goals by club, season and competition
Club	Season	League			Cup (Note: Includes Copa Argentina)		League Cup (Note: Includes Copa de la Liga Profesional)		Continental (Note: Includes Copa Sudamericana and CONCACAF Champions League)		Other (Note: Includes Copa de la Superliga, Leagues Cup and FIFA Club World Cup)		Total	
Club	Season	Division	Apps	Goals	Apps	Goals	Apps	Goals	Apps	Goals	Apps	Goals	Apps	Goals
Lanús	2017–18	Primera División	15	0	0	0	—		2	0	—		17	0
Lanús	2018–19	Primera División	24	4	2	0	—		4	0	—		30	4
Lanús	2019–20	Primera División	16	0	3	0	—		0	0	—		19	0
Lanús	2020–21	Primera División	0	0	1	0	7	0	10	5	—		18	5
Lanús	2021	Primera División	17	1	0	0	12	2	3	1	—		32	4
Lanús	2022	Primera División	17	0	0	0	9	0	7	1	—		33	1
Lanús	2023	Primera División	21	2	0	0	—		—		—		21	2
Lanús	Total		110	7	6	0	28	2	26	7	0	0	170	16
Toluca	2023–24	Liga MX	29	2	—		—		1	0	1	0	31	2
Boca Juniors	2024	Primera División	16	0	2	1	—		2	0	—		20	1
Boca Juniors	2025	Primera División	21	0	0	0	—		—		2	0	23	0
Boca Juniors	2026	Primera División	5	0	1	0	—		—		—		6	0
Boca Juniors	Total		42	0	3	1	0	0	2	0	2	0	49	1
Career total			181	9	9	1	28	2	29	7	3	0	250	19

== Honours ==
Boca Juniors

- Copa Sudamericana: 2026

- Argentine Primera División: 2026 Liga
Argentina U23

- Pre-Olympic Tournament: 2020
