= Lautaro Di Lollo =

Argentine footballer

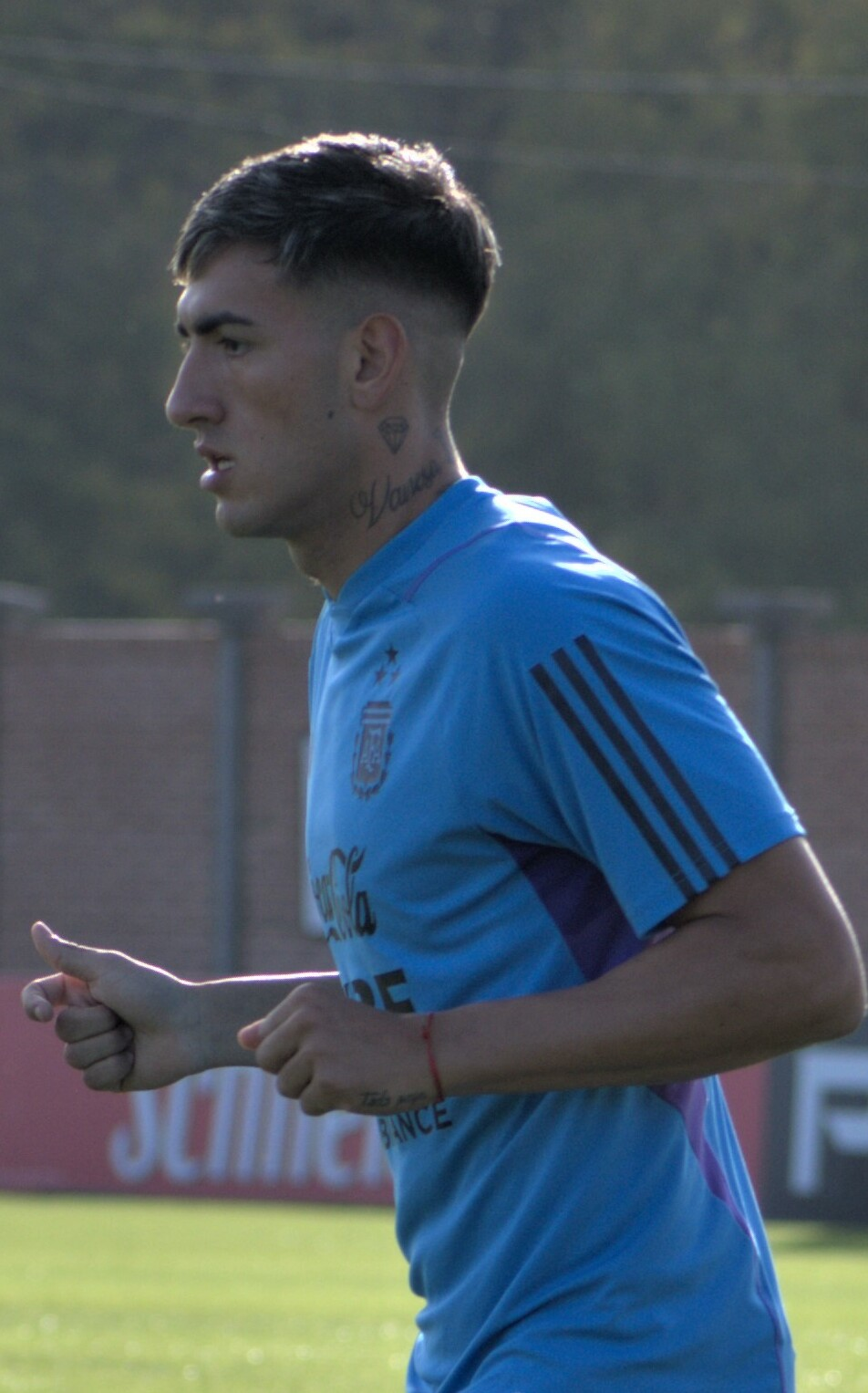
- Di Lollo in 2023

Personal information
- Full name: Lautaro Federico Di Lollo
- Date of birth: 10 March 2004 (age 22)
- Place of birth: Buenos Aires, Argentina
- Height: 1.87 m (6 ft 2 in)
- Position: Defender

Team information
- Current team: Boca Juniors
- Number: 2

Senior career*
Years	Team	Apps	(Gls)
2022–	Boca Juniors	65	(6)

International career
2022–2023	Argentina U20	17	(0)
- * Club domestic league appearances and goals as of 20:17, 4 November 2026 (UTC)

Lautaro Federico Di Lollo (born 10 March 2004) is an Argentine professional footballer who plays as a defender for Primera División club Boca Juniors.

== Career ==
Di Lollo signed his first professional contract with Boca Juniors in July 2022, a four-year contract until 2026. The defender made the substitute bench of the first team match day squad in 2022 for matches against Estudiantes LP, Argentinos Juniors and Talleres de Córdoba. In October 2022, Di Lollo was one of the scorers in the match that Boca Juniors' reserve team won the 2022 Torneo de Reserva.

== International career ==
He was named in the Argentina under-20 squad by Javier Mascherano for the 2023 South American U-20 Championship held in Colombia in January and February 2023.

== Personal life ==
Di Lollo was born in Argentina and is of Italian descent, and holds dual Argentine and Italian citizenship.

== Career statistics ==
As of match played 1 November 2026

Appearances and goals by club, season and competition
Club	Season	League			Copa Argentina		League cup		Continental		Other		Total	
Club	Season	Division	Apps	Goals	Apps	Goals	Apps	Goals	Apps	Goals	Apps	Goals	Apps	Goals
Boca Juniors	2024	Primera División	12	0	2	0	0	0	7 (Note: Appearances in Copa Sudamericana)	0	0	0	21	0
Boca Juniors	2025	Primera División	27	3	0	0	—		1 (Note: Appearance in Copa Libertadores)	0	2 (Note: Appearances in FIFA Club World Cup)	0	30	3
Boca Juniors	2026	Primera División	26	3	2	0	—		11 (Note: Six appearances and one goal in Copa Libertadores, five appearances and one goal in Copa Sudamericana)	2	0	0	39	5
Career total			65	6	4	0	0	0	19	2	2	0	90	8

== Honours ==
Boca Juniors

- Argentine Primera División: 2026 Liga
- Copa Sudamericana: 2026
