= Camilo Rey Domenech =

Argentine footballer

Personal information
- Full name: Camilo Rey Domenech
- Date of birth: 10 March 2006 (age 20)
- Place of birth: Pilar, Buenos Aires, Argentina
- Height: 1.77 m (5 ft 10 in)
- Position: Midfielder

Team information
- Current team: Boca Juniors
- Number: 23

Youth career
- Sportivo Pilar
- 2016–2025: Boca Juniors

Senior career*
Years	Team	Apps	(Gls)
2025–	Boca Juniors	7	(0)

International career
2022	Argentina U16	4	(0)
2022–2023	Argentina U17	4	(0)
- * Club domestic league appearances and goals as of 17:34, 16 June 2026 (UTC)

Camilo Rey Domenech (born 10 March 2006) is an Argentine footballer who plays as a midfielder for Primera División club Boca Juniors.

== Club career ==
Rey Domenech started his career in Sportivo Pilar football academy. When he was 10 he joined youth academy of Boca Juniors. In December 2024 he signed his first professional contract with Boca Juniors. On 22 January 2025 he made his first team debut in Copa Argentina match against Argentino Monte Maíz. Four days later he made his Primera División debut against Argentinos Juniors.

== International career ==
Rey Domenech has represented the Argentina national U16 and U17 teams.

In 2023 he was called up to the under-17 football team ahead of the 2023 South American Championship. He made one appearance against Venezuela.

== Honours ==
Boca Juniors

- Copa Sudamericana: 2026
- Argentine Primera División: 2026 Liga
