= 2018 Sheikh Jassim Cup =

Al-Rayyan SC	Al-Duhail SC
QSL	Emir of Qatar Cup
1	1
- Date: 1 August 2018
- Venue: Jassim Bin Hamad Stadium, Doha

The 2018 Sheikh Jassim Cup was the 40th edition of the cup competition for football teams from Qatar. It was changed from a group staged pre-season tournament featuring all Qatari Stars League sides, to a one-off match between the previous seasons Qatar Stars League winners and Emir of Qatar Cup winners.

== Match details ==
1 August 2018
16:00

Al-Rayyan SC	1–1	Al-Duhail SC
Abdurahman Al-Harazi 63'	Report	Ismaeel Mohammad 23'
Penalties
Rodrigo Tabata (penalty scored); Koh Myong-jin (penalty scored); Khalfan Ibrahim (penalty scored); Sebastian Soria (penalty scored); Ahmed Al Saadi (penalty scored)	5-3	Youssef El-Arabi (penalty scored); Nam Tae-hee (penalty scored); Mohamed Musa (penalty scored)

Jassim Bin Hamad Stadium, Doha

Al-Rayyan SC	Al-Duhail SC

Formation: 4–4–2
GK	1
DF	2
DF	3
DF	20
MF	23
MF	16
MF	5
MF	14
MF	10
MF	8
FW	78
Substitutes
FW	9
MF	19
Manager
(Argentina) Rodolfo Arruabarrena

Formation: 4–4–2
GK	40
DF	14
DF	5
MF	7
MF	8
MF	12
FW	9
MF	17
MF	15
MF	20
FW	28
Substitutes
FW	11
DF	14
Manager
(Tunisia) Nabil Maâloul

Man of the Match:
()

Match rules

- 90 minutes.
- Penalty shoot-out if scores still level.
- Seven named substitutes, of which up to three may be used.
