= Miguel Merentiel =

Uruguayan footballer (born 1996)

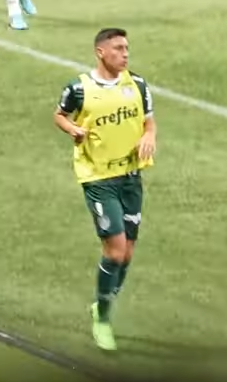
- Merentiel with Palmeiras in 2022

Personal information
- Full name: Miguel Ángel Merentiel Serrano
- Date of birth: 24 February 1996 (age 30)
- Place of birth: Paysandú, Uruguay
- Height: 1.80 m (5 ft 11 in)
- Position: Forward

Team information
- Current team: Boca Juniors
- Number: 16

Youth career
- Independencia Paysandú
- Bella Vista Paysandú
- Peñarol

Senior career*
Years	Team	Apps	(Gls)
2017–2019	Peñarol	0	(0)
2017	→ El Tanque Sisley (loan)	20	(7)
2017–2018	→ Lorca (loan)	14	(1)
2018–2019	→ Valencia B (loan)	29	(8)
2019–2022	Godoy Cruz	17	(4)
2020–2021	→ Defensa y Justicia (loan)	42	(17)
2022	Defensa y Justicia	15	(7)
2022–2023	Palmeiras	10	(2)
2023	→ Boca Juniors (loan)	31	(14)
2024–	Boca Juniors	103	(37)

International career^{‡}
2024	Uruguay	1	(0)
- * Club domestic league appearances and goals as of 17:21, 7 November 2026 (UTC) ‡ National team caps and goals as of 10 September 2024

Miguel Ángel Merentiel Serrano (born 24 February 1996) is a Uruguayan professional footballer who plays as a forward for Argentine Primera División club Boca Juniors.

== Club career ==
Born in Paysandú, Merentiel is a Peñarol youth academy graduate. On 9 January 2017, he was loaned to fellow Uruguayan Primera División club El Tanque Sisley for six months.

Merentiel made his professional debut on 19 February 2017, starting in a 4–3 away loss to Cerro. He scored his first goal seven days later, netting the first in a 2–1 away win against Liverpool Montevideo. On 12 March, he scored a brace in a 2–1 win against Montevideo Wanderers.

On 3 August 2017, Merentiel moved abroad for the first time in his career, after agreeing to a one-year loan deal with Segunda División side Lorca FC. The following 31 January, his loan was cut short.

In January 2019, Merentiel was signed by Argentine club Godoy Cruz for a fee around 175.000 euros. On 10 September 2020, he was loaned out to Defensa y Justicia until the end of 2021 with a purchase option. On 2 January 2022, Defensa triggered the option and signed him on a permanently contract until the end of 2024.

On May 18, 2022, Merentiel signed a four-year contract with Palmeiras. In January 2023, he was loaned to Argentine club Boca Juniors with a trade option of US$3 million. On 10 November 2023, Boca used the purchase option.

== International career ==
In September 2024, Merentiel received his first call-up to the Uruguay national team for FIFA World Cup qualification matches against Paraguay and Venezuela. He debuted against the latter on 10 September 2024 at the Estadio Monumental de Maturín. He substituted Maximiliano Araújo at half-time as the game ended scoreless.

== Career statistics ==
=== Club ===
As of 21 November 2026

Appearances and goals by club, season and competition
Club	Season	League			Cup (Note: Includes Copa del Rey, Copa Argentina)		Continental		Other		Total	
Club	Season	Division	Apps	Goals	Apps	Goals	Apps	Goals	Apps	Goals	Apps	Goals
El Tanque Sisley (loan)	2017	Liga Uruguaya	20	7	—		—		—		20	7
Lorca (loan)	2017–18	Segunda División	14	1	1	0	—		—		15	1
Valencia Mestalla (loan)	2017–18	Segunda División B	11	4	—		—		—		11	4
Valencia Mestalla (loan)	2018–19	Segunda División B	18	4	—		—		—		18	4
Valencia Mestalla (loan)	Total		29	8	—		—		—		29	8
Godoy Cruz	2018–19	Primera División	5	2	2	0	5 (Note: Appearances in Copa Libertadores)	0	4 (Note: Appearances in Copa de la Superliga)	1	16	3
Godoy Cruz	2019–20	Primera División	12	2	—		—		1	0	13	2
Godoy Cruz	Total		17	4	2	0	5	0	5	1	29	5
Defensa y Justicia (loan)	2020	Copa de la Liga Profesional	10	6	—		9 (Note: Four appearances in Copa Libertadores, five appearances in Copa Sudamericana)	0	1	0	20	6
Defensa y Justicia (loan)	2021	Primera División	32	11	3	1	5	0	1 (Note: Appearance in Recopa Sudamericana)	0	41	12
Defensa y Justicia	2022	Primera División	15	7	1	1	3 (Note: Appearances in Copa Sudamericana)	1	—		19	9
Defensa y Justicia	Total		57	24	4	2	17	1	2	0	80	27
Palmeiras	2022	Série A	9	2	—		1	0	—		10	2
Palmeiras	2023	Série A	—		—		—		1 (Note: Appearance in Campeonato Paulista)	0	1	0
Palmeiras	Total		9	2	—		1	0	1	0	11	2
Boca Juniors (loan)	2023	Primera División	31	14	5	3	13	1	1 (Note: Appearance in Supercopa Argentina)	0	50	18
Boca Juniors	2024	Primera División	38	14	3	2	8	1	—		49	17
Boca Juniors	2025	Primera División	37	13	2	1	2	0	3 (Note: Appearances in FIFA Club World Cup)	1	44	15
Boca Juniors	2026	Primera División	28	10	5	0	15 (Note: Six appearances and one goal in Copa Libertadores, nine appearances and five goals in Copa Sudamericana)	6	—		48	16
Boca Juniors	Total		134	51	15	6	38	8	4	1	191	66
Career total			280	97	22	8	61	9	12	2	375	116

=== International ===
As of match played 10 September 2024

Appearances and goals by national team and year
National team	Year	Apps	Goals
Uruguay	2024	1	0
Total		1	0

== Honours ==
Defensa y Justicia

- Copa Sudamericana: 2020
- Recopa Sudamericana: 2021

Palmeiras

- Campeonato Brasileiro Série A: 2022
- Campeonato Paulista: 2023

Boca Juniors

- Copa Sudamericana: 2026
- Argentine Primera División: 2026 Liga
- Supercopa Argentina: 2022
