= Gonzalo Gelini =

Argentine footballer (born 2006)

Personal information
- Date of birth: 15 December 2006 (age 19)
- Place of birth: Monte Grande, Buenos Aires, Argentina
- Height: 1.75 m (5 ft 9 in)
- Position: Winger

Team information
- Current team: Peñarol (on loan from Boca Juniors)
- Number: 23

Senior career*
Years	Team	Apps	(Gls)
2026–	Boca Juniors	5	(0)
2026–	→ Peñarol (loan)	2	(0)
- * Club domestic league appearances and goals as of 14:02, 19 September 2025 (UTC) ‡ National team caps and goals as of 14:02, 19 September 2025 (UTC)

Gonzalo Gelini (born 15 December 2006) is an Argentine professional footballer who plays as a winger for Liga AUF Uruguaya club Peñarol, on loan from AFA Liga Profesional de Fútbol club Boca Juniors.

== Club career ==
Gelini made his debut for Boca Juniors' first team on 28 January 2026, in an AFA Liga Profesional de Fútbol match against Estudiantes de La Plata. The game ended in a 2-1 victory for Estudiantes. Gelini came on in the 75th minute and had a standout performance, providing an assist for the visitors' only goal. Then, on 1 February, he made his first start in a 2-0 victory against Newell's Old Boys.

On 27 August 2026, Gelini was loaned to Peñarol of the Liga AUF Uruguaya. On 30 August 2026, he made his official debut for Peñarol, coming on in the 58th minute against Nacional with the score at 1-0 against them.

== Honours ==
Boca Juniors

- Argentine Primera División: 2026 Liga
