= Adam Bareiro =

Paraguayan footballer (born 1996)

Personal information
- Full name: Adam Fernando Bareiro Gamarra
- Date of birth: 26 July 1996 (age 30)
- Place of birth: Asunción, Paraguay
- Height: 1.84 m (6 ft 0 in)
- Position: Forward

Team information
- Current team: Boca Juniors
- Number: 28

Senior career*
Years	Team	Apps	(Gls)
2015–2016	Olimpia	1	(0)
2016	→ River Plate Asunción (loan)	4	(0)
2017–2018	Nacional Asunción	69	(26)
2018–2022	Monterrey	7	(1)
2019–2020	→ San Lorenzo (loan)	11	(2)
2020–2021	→ Alanyaspor (loan)	37	(5)
2021	→ Atlético San Luis (loan)	11	(2)
2022	→ San Lorenzo (loan)	26	(10)
2023–2024	San Lorenzo	26	(5)
2024–2025	River Plate	11	(0)
2025–2025	→ Al-Rayyan (loan)	10	(3)
2025–2026	Fortaleza	31	(10)
2026–	Boca Juniors	10	(3)

International career^{‡}
2023–2024	Paraguay	8	(0)
- * Club domestic league appearances and goals as of 17:31, 16 June 2026 (UTC) ‡ National team caps and goals as of 04:32, 13 October 2023 (UTC)

Adam Fernando Bareiro Gamarra (born 26 July 1996) is a Paraguayan professional footballer who plays as a forward for Boca Juniors.

== Career statistics ==
=== Club ===
As of 24 May 2024

Appearances and goals by club, season and competition
Club	Season	League			Cup		Continental		Other		Total	
Club	Season	Division	Apps	Goals	Apps	Goals	Apps	Goals	Apps	Goals	Apps	Goals
Olimpia	2015	Paraguayan Primera División	1	0	—		—		—		1	0
River Plate (loan)	2016	Paraguayan Primera División	4	0	—		—		—		4	0
Nacional	2017	Paraguayan Primera División	29	7	—		5 (Note: Appearance(s) in Copa Sudamericana)	2	—		34	9
Nacional	2018	Paraguayan Primera División	40	19	—		4	0	—		44	19
Nacional	Total		69	26	—		9	2	—		78	28
Monterrey	2018-19	Liga MX	7	1	0	0	1 (Note: Appearance(s) in CONCACAF Champions Cup)	0	—		8	1
San Lorenzo (loan)	2019-20	Argentine Primera División	11	2	0	0	2 (Note: Appearance(s) in Copa Libertadores)	1	2 (Note: One appearance in Copa de la Superliga, One appearance in Torneos de Verano)	1 (Note: One goal in Copa de la Superliga)	15	4
Alanyaspor (loan)	2020-21	Süper Lig	37	5	3	1	1 (Note: Appearance(s) in UEFA Europa League)	0	—		41	6
Atlético San Luis (loan)	2021-22	Liga MX	11	2	—		—		—		11	2
San Lorenzo (loan)	2022	Argentine Primera División	36	11	1	0	—		—		37	11
San Lorenzo	2023	Argentine Primera División	35	12	4	0	9	6	—		48	18
San Lorenzo	2024	Argentine Primera División	15	6	1	0	4	1	—		20	7
San Lorenzo	Total		50	18	5	0	13	7	—		68	25
Career total			226	65	9	1	27	11	2	1	264	78

=== International ===
As of 28 June 2024

Appearances and goals by national team and year
National team	Year	Apps	Goals
Paraguay	2023	3	0
Paraguay	2024	5	0
Total		8	0

== Honours ==
Olimpia

- Paraguayan Primera División: 2015 Clausura

Monterrey

- CONCACAF Champions League: 2019

Fortaleza

- Campeonato Cearense: 2026

Boca Juniors

- Copa Sudamericana: 2026
- Argentine Primera División: 2026 Liga
