= Leandro Lozano =

Urugyayan footballer (born 1998)

Personal information
- Full name: Leandro Nicolás Lozano Fernández
- Date of birth: 19 December 1998 (age 27)
- Place of birth: Montevideo, Uruguay
- Height: 1.69 m (5 ft 7 in)
- Position: Right-back

Team information
- Current team: Boca Juniors

Youth career
- 2010–2018: Nacional

Senior career*
Years	Team	Apps	(Gls)
2019–2023	Boston River	73	(1)
2022	→ Nacional (loan)	28	(1)
2023–2025	Nacional	62	(1)
2025–2026	Argentinos Juniors	49	(1)
2026–	Boca Juniors	0	(0)
- * Club domestic league appearances and goals as of 17:26, 10 July 2026 (UTC)

Leandro Nicolás Lozano Fernández (born 19 December 1998) is a Uruguayan professional footballer who plays as a right-back for Argentine Primera División club Boca Juniors.

== Career ==
A youth academy graduate of Nacional, Lozano captained his club to victory at the 2018 U-20 Copa Libertadores.

A free agent after leaving Nacional in 2018, Lozano joined Boston River prior to the 2019 Uruguayan Primera División season. He made his professional debut on 10 August 2019 in a 0–0 draw against his former club Nacional.

In January 2025, Lozano moved abroad for the first time in his career and joined Argentine club Argentinos Juniors.

== Personal life ==
Lozano is the nephew of Uruguayan footballer Brian Lozano.

== Career statistics ==
As of 4 August 2024

Appearances and goals by club, season and competition
Club	Season	League			National cup		Continental		Other		Total	
Club	Season	Division	Apps	Goals	Apps	Goals	Apps	Goals	Apps	Goals	Apps	Goals
Boston River	2019	UPD	16	0	—		—		—		16	0
Boston River	2020	UPD	35	1	—		—		—		35	1
Boston River	2021	UPD	22	0	—		—		—		22	0
Boston River	Total		73	1	0	0	0	0	0	0	73	1
Nacional (loan)	2022	UPD	28	1	1	0	7 (Note: Four appearances in Copa Libertadores; three appearances, one goal in Copa Sudamericana)	1	2 (Note: One appearance each in Torneo Intermedio final and championship playoff)	0	38	2
Nacional	2023	UPD	30	1	2	0	8 (Note: Appearances in Copa Libertadores)	0	1 (Note: Appearance in Supercopa Uruguaya)	0	41	1
Nacional	2024	UPD	18	0	0	0	10	2	1 (Note: Appearance in Torneo Intermedio final)	0	29	2
Nacional	Total		76	2	3	0	25	3	4	0	108	5
Career total			149	3	3	0	25	3	4	0	181	6

== Honours ==
Nacional U20

- U-20 Copa Libertadores: 2018

Nacional

- Uruguayan Primera División: 2022

Boca Juniors

- Copa Sudamericana: 2026
- Argentine Primera División: 2026 Liga

Individual

- Uruguayan Primera División team of the season: 2024
