= Álvaro Montero =

Álvaro Montero may refer to:

- Álvaro Montero (Spanish footballer) (born 1989)
- Álvaro Montero (Colombian footballer) (born 1995)
