= Lautaro Blanco =

Argentine footballer (born 1999)

Personal information
- Full name: Lautaro Emanuel Blanco
- Date of birth: 19 February 1999 (age 27)
- Place of birth: Rosario, Santa Fe, Argentina
- Height: 1.76 m (5 ft 9 in)
- Position: Left-back

Team information
- Current team: Boca Juniors
- Number: 3

Youth career
- La Consolata
- Rosario Central

Senior career*
Years	Team	Apps	(Gls)
2020–2022	Rosario Central	84	(0)
2023–2024	Elche	27	(0)
2024–	Boca Juniors	67	(2)
- * Club domestic league appearances and goals as of 17:10, 16 June 2026 (UTC)

Lautaro Emanuel Blanco (born 19 February 1999) is an Argentine professional footballer who plays as a left-back for Argentine Primera División club Boca Juniors.

== Club career ==
=== Rosario Central ===
Blanco started out with local team La Consolata, before joining the Rosario Central academy. He signed his first professional contract at the beginning of July 2020. Blanco made the breakthrough into first-team football later that year under manager Kily González, with the defender's senior debut arriving on 2 November in the Copa de la Liga Profesional against Godoy Cruz; he played, at left-back, the full duration of a 2–1 win.

=== Elche ===
On 8 August 2022, Spanish La Liga side Elche CF reached an agreement with Rosario Central for the transfer of Blanco, with the player joining his new club in the following January.

== International career ==
In March 2023, Blanco received his first call-up to the Argentina senior national team by head coach Lionel Scaloni for two friendly matches against Panama and Curaçao.

== Career statistics ==
=== Club ===
As of match played 19 March 2023

Appearances and goals by club, season and competition
Club	Season	League			Cup		Continental		Other		Total	
Club	Season	Division	Apps	Goals	Apps	Goals	Apps	Goals	Apps	Goals	Apps	Goals
Rosario Central	2020–21 (Note: Soccerway counts Copa de la Liga Profesional appearances as league appearances.)	Argentine Primera División	12	0	1	0	—		—		13	0
Rosario Central	2021	Argentine Primera División	33	0	0	0	10 (Note: Appearance(s) in Copa Sudamericana)	0	—		43	0
Rosario Central	2022	Argentine Primera División	39	0	1	0	—		—		40	0
Rosario Central	Total		84	0	2	0	10	0	0	0	96	0
Elche	2022–23	La Liga	8	0	1	0	—		—		9	0
Career total			92	0	3	0	10	0	0	0	105	0

== Honours ==
Boca Juniors

- Argentine Primera División: 2026 Liga
- Copa Sudamericana: 2026
