= Sebastián Villa =

Sebastián Villa may refer to:

- Sebastián Villa (diver) (born 1992), Colombian diver
- Sebastián Villa (footballer) (born 1996), Colombian footballer
