= Milton Delgado =

Argentine footballer (born 2005)

Personal information
- Date of birth: 16 June 2005 (age 21)
- Place of birth: La Matanza Partido, Argentina
- Height: 1.66 m (5 ft 5 in)
- Position: Defensive midfielder

Team information
- Current team: Boca Juniors
- Number: 18

Youth career
- CA Los Ángeles
- 2015–2024: Boca Juniors

Senior career*
Years	Team	Apps	(Gls)
2024–	Boca Juniors	60	(0)

International career^{‡}
2024–2025	Argentina U20	20	(2)
Medal record
Men's football
Representing Argentina
FIFA U-20 World Cup
Runner-up	2025 Chile
- * Club domestic league appearances and goals as of 19:37, 17 October 2026 (UTC) ‡ National team caps and goals as of 19:37, 17 October 2026 (UTC)

Milton Delgado (born 16 June 2005) is an Argentine professional footballer who plays as a defensive midfielder for Argentine Primera División club Boca Juniors.

== Club career ==
A youth product of CA Los Ángeles, Delgado joined the academy of Boca Juniors at the age of 10 and worked his way up their youth categories. On 9 February 2024, he signed his first professional contract with the club until 2028. He made his senior and professional debut with Boca Juniors in a 0–0 Copa Sudamericana tie with Nacional Potosí on 4 March 2024.

== International career ==
Delgado made the final squad for the Argentina U20s at the 2025 South American U-20 Championship. He was part of the Argentina U20s that came second in the 2025 FIFA U-20 World Cup, and won the Bronze Ball for his performances.

== Honours ==
Boca Juniors

- Copa Sudamericana: 2026
- Argentine Primera División: 2026 Liga

Argentina U20

- FIFA U-20 World Cup runner-up: 2025

Individual

- FIFA U-20 World Cup Bronze Ball: 2025
