= Matías Satas =

Argentine footballer (born 2008)

Personal information
- Full name: Matías Gabriel Satas
- Date of birth: 28 February 2008 (age 18)
- Place of birth: Morón, Argentina
- Height: 1.84 m (6 ft 0 in)
- Position: Defender

Team information
- Current team: Boca
- Number: 46

Youth career
- Boca

Senior career*
| Years | Team | Apps | (Gls) |
| 2026– | Boca Juniors | 2 | (0) |

International career^{‡}
| 2024 | Argentina U15 | 5 | (0) |
| 2024 | Argentina U16 | 2 | (0) |
| 2024–2025 | Argentina U17 | 9 | (0) |
| 2026– | Argentina U19 | 5 | (0) |
- * Club domestic league appearances and goals ‡ National team caps and goals as of 6 November 2026

Matías Gabriel Satas (born 28 February 2008) is an Argentine professional footballer who plays as a defender for Boca.

== Early life ==
Satas was born on 20 February 2008 to a policeman father and a teacher mother. Born in Morón, Argentina, he is a native of the city.

== Club career ==
As a youth player, Satas joined the youth academy of Boca.

== International career ==
Satas is an Argentina youth international. During March and April 2025, he played for the Argentina national under-17 football team at the 2025 South American U-17 Championship.

== Style of play ==
Satas plays as a defender. English newspaper The Guardian wrote in 2025 that he is "a strong defender, he has a good left foot and at 1.85m (6ft 1in), he is good in the air and capable of scoring from set pieces".

== Honours ==
Boca Juniors

- Argentine Primera División: 2026 Liga
