= Santiago Ascacíbar =

Argentine footballer (born 1997)

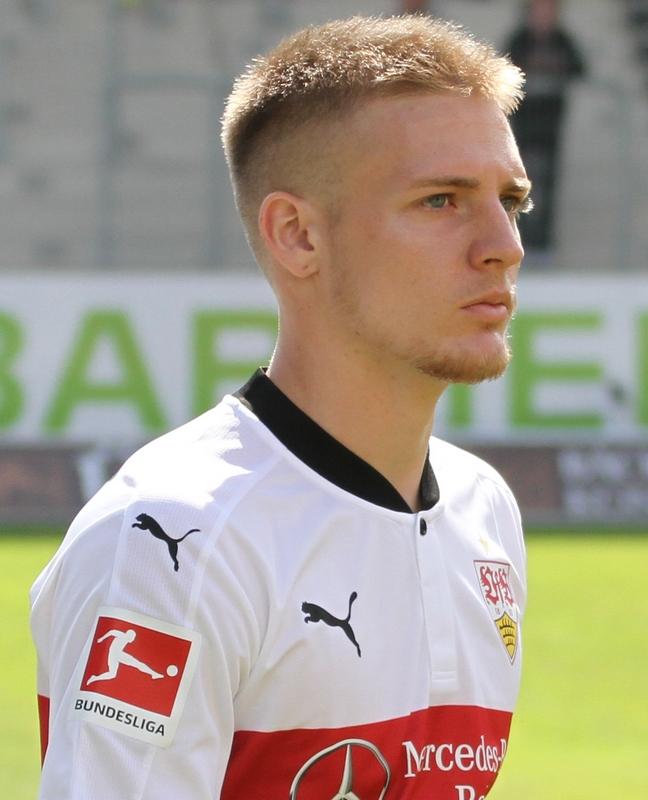
- Ascacíbar with VfB Stuttgart in 2017

Personal information
- Full name: Santiago Lionel Ascacíbar
- Date of birth: 25 February 1997 (age 29)
- Place of birth: La Plata, Argentina
- Height: 1.70 m (5 ft 7 in)
- Position: Defensive midfielder

Team information
- Current team: Boca Juniors
- Number: 25

Youth career
- 2006–2015: Estudiantes

Senior career*
Years	Team	Apps	(Gls)
2016–2017	Estudiantes	41	(0)
2017–2020	VfB Stuttgart	69	(1)
2020–2023	Hertha BSC	49	(1)
2022–2023	→ Cremonese (loan)	13	(0)
2023	→ Estudiantes (LP) (loan)	20	(4)
2023–2026	Estudiantes (LP)	88	(9)
2026–	Boca Juniors	28	(5)

International career^{‡}
2017	Argentina U20	12	(0)
2016	Argentina Olympic	5	(0)
2018	Argentina	3	(0)
- * Club domestic league appearances and goals as of 23:56, 7 November 2026 (UTC) ‡ National team caps and goals as of 27 September 2019 (UTC)

Santiago Lionel Ascacíbar (born 25 February 1997) is an Argentine professional footballer who plays as a defensive midfielder for Argentine Primera División club Boca Juniors. He has also represented the Argentina national team.

Ascacíbar began his career at hometown club Estudiantes de La Plata. He then moved to Bundesliga team VfB Stuttgart in 2017, developing a reputation as a natural leader alongside criticism for his temperament. He completed a transfer to Hertha BSC in January 2020 after Stuttgart had suffered relegation the previous season, with manager Jürgen Klinsmann describing him as "one of the best defensive midfielders in the Bundesliga". After a loan move to Cremonese in the 2022–23 season, Ascacíbar returned to hometown club Estudiantes LP in 2023.

Ascacíbar was part of the Argentine team that competed at the 2016 Summer Olympics. He made his senior debut in 2018.

== Early years ==
Ascacíbar was born on 25 February 1997 in La Plata, Argentina, as part of an extended family: son of Mariana Rollero and Javier Ascacíbar, he was raised in Villa Elvira alongside his four brothers. His family also took in two of his teammates who for various reasons could not stay in the academy of his youth club Estudiantes; also considering both to be his brothers.

== Club career ==
=== Estudiantes LP ===
Ascacíbar arrived at Estudiantes (LP) in 2006 at the age of 8, after performing a trial in which coach Omar Rulli –father of goalkeeper Gerónimo Rulli – was surprised by his tenacity, describing Ascacíbar as "a fan of practice, very obsessive from a young age to improve his technique, as well as with his daily work". Denoting his skill as a central midfielder from early on, and a strong presence on the pitch rarely seen among academy players, Rusito ("The Little Russian"), as he was nicknamed since childhood due to his blond hair and blue eyes, quickly became a key player in his age class.

After recording impressive performances in his first four years in AFA youth divisions, the team's youth football coordinator Hermes Desio promoted him to the reserves for the first time in late 2014, and Ascacíbar made his debut in a match against the reserves of Rosario Central away at the Estadio Gigante de Arroyito.

Already in early 2015, he represented Estudiantes at the Frenz International Cup in Malaysia and Indonesia with a team consisting of players born in 1997 and 1998. Although Estudiantes lost the final to Brazilian club Internacional, the organisers chose him as the best player of the tournament. Once back in Argentina, Nelson Vivas, manager of the first team, made him the starting central midfielder of the reserves.

That same year, and on the recommendation of former international Juan Sebastián Verón who was now president of the club, Ascacíbar finished his secondary studies at the Colegio de Estudiantes and enrolled in Anthropology at the National University of La Plata, despite not being able to regularly attend classes due to his professional debut with the first team.16In this sense, Ascacibar was seen as the antithesis of the typical professional footballer: he still lived with his parents and siblings and lead a life away from lavishness, valuing an education.

You have to have a clear mind on your goals and then it's up to you to reach those goals. If you want to have luxury cars and women, you're going to have them; if you don't want to have them, you're not going to have them. No one puts a gun to your head and says 'do it'. But you don't have to judge that either, because everyone is responsible for what they do and everyone is free in their life to do what they want.

— Santiago Ascacíbar in 2017.

On 8 February 2016, Ascacíbar made his professional debut for Estudiantes, playing the entire match against Lanús in the Argentine Primera División which ended in a 1–0 loss. Over the course of the season, his performances with the first team improved and he became a starter for the team. In his first full season as a first-team player, he appeared in all games and was the player who recovered the most balls. At the end of the season, he was awarded the Olimpia Award in the category Best Player of Local Football.

His final appearance for the club came on 3 August 2017 in a 2–0 victory against Nacional Potosí in the Copa Sudamericana. When he was subbed off, he received a standing ovation at the Estadio Ciudad de La Plata.

=== VfB Stuttgart ===
On 22 August 2017, Ascacíbar signed a five-year deal with VfB Stuttgart. He made his debut on 10 September, coming off the bench in the 62nd minute for Orel Mangala in a 3–1 away defeat against Schalke 04.

In August 2018, Ascacíbar extended his contract with Stuttgart until June 2023. At the end of the season, the club suffered relegation to the 2. Bundesliga.

He scored his first goal for Stuttgart against Dynamo Dresden on 3 November 2019 in the 2. Bundesliga, slotting home from short distance in an eventual 3–1 victory at Mercedes-Benz Arena. This came after a period, where Ascacíbar had been suspended by the team due to his demands of being the starting defensive midfielder. Manager Tim Walter afterwards called him a "temperamental boy" who could sometimes "get carried away".

=== Hertha BSC ===
On 1 January 2020, Ascacíbar signed a long-term contract with Bundesliga club Hertha BSC. He made his debut for the club on 19 January in a 4–0 home loss to Bayern Munich. Despite the defeat, Hertha manager Jürgen Klinsmann praised Ascacíbar, calling him "one of the best Number 6 in the Bundesliga". In May 2020, however, following the upheaval of the COVID-19 suspension of German football, he suffered a foot injury that kept him out for several weeks. Several injuries would keep him sidelined the following months, and he failed to make any more appearances in 2020.

Ascacíbar returned to the pitch on 30 January 2021 under new manager Pál Dárdai, playing 89 minutes of the 3–1 defeat to Eintracht Frankfurt. In a Berliner Derby against Union Berlin on 4 April, Ascacíbar was shown a yellow card after a verbal altercation with opposing player Nico Schlotterbeck, which prompted a subsequent investigation by the German Football Association (DFB). The investigation was, however, discontinued on 8 April after the conditions for blatantly anti-sports conduct were not met. In the following game, on 10 April, Ascacíbar was also the centre of attention. Despite scoring the opening goal against Borussia Mönchengladbach in an eventual 2–2 draw, he sneered when substituted off in the second half, which coach Dárdai criticised afterwards.

Ahead of the 2021–22 season, in a pre-season friendly against Liverpool, Ascacíbar suffered a concussion after colliding with opposing goalkeeper Caoimhín Kelleher after scoring the opening goal in a 4–3 victory. He returned to the pitch for the first competitive game of the season, playing the entire DFB-Pokal match against SV Meppen.

==== Loan to Cremonese ====
On 23 July 2022, Ascacíbar joined Serie A club Cremonese on loan with an option to buy. On 14 August he made his debut for the club in Cremonese's 3–2 Serie A loss to Fiorentina.

=== Return to Estudiantes ===
On 18 January 2023, Ascacíbar returned to Estudiantes on loan. On 26 May 2023, Hertha announced that the transfer was made permanent.

=== Boca Juniors ===
On 27 January 2026, Ascacíbar joined Boca Juniors, signing a four-year contract. Boca purchased 80% of his rights from Estudiantes.

== International career ==
He represented Argentina in the football competition at the 2016 Summer Olympics. He made his senior international debut for Argentina on 8 September 2018 in a 3–0 international friendly against the Guatemala national football team. With the U20 team, Argentina finished in 4th place at the 2017 South American Youth Championship, thus qualifying to the 2017 U20 FIFA World Cup. As the case at the Olympics which was held a year prior, Argentina did not make it past the group stage.

== Career statistics ==
=== Club ===
As of 21 November 2026

Appearances and goals by club, season and competition
Club	Season	League			Cup		Continental		Other		Total	
Club	Season	Division	Apps	Goals	Apps	Goals	Apps	Goals	Apps	Goals	Apps	Goals
Estudiantes	2016	Primera División	17	0	—		—		—		17	0
Estudiantes	2016–17	Primera División	24	0	1	0	8	0	—		33	0
Estudiantes	Total		41	0	1	0	8	0	—		50	0
Stuttgart	2017–18	Bundesliga	29	0	2	0	—		—		31	0
Stuttgart	2018–19	Bundesliga	27	0	0	0	—		1	0	28	0
Stuttgart	2019–20	2. Bundesliga	13	1	2	0	—		—		15	1
Stuttgart	Total		69	1	4	0	—		1	0	74	1
Hertha	2019–20	Bundesliga	8	0	1	0	—		—		9	0
Hertha	2020–21	Bundesliga	13	1	0	0	—		—		13	1
Hertha	2021–22	Bundesliga	28	0	2	0	—		1	0	31	0
Hertha	Total		49	1	3	0	—		1	0	53	1
Cremonese (loan)	2022–23	Serie A	13	0	1	0	—		—		14	0
Estudiantes (loan)	2023	Primera División	35	4	5	1	10	0	1	0	51	5
Estudiantes	2024	Primera División	38	5	2	0	5	1	1	0	46	6
Estudiantes	2025	Primera División	33	4	2	0	10	3	2	0	47	7
Estudiantes	2026	Primera División	1	0	1	0	—		—		2	0
Estudiantes	Total		107	14	10	1	25	4	4	0	146	17
Boca Juniors	2026	Primera División	28	5	5	1	13	4	—		46	10
Career total			307	20	24	2	46	8	6	0	383	30

=== International ===
As of match played 20 November 2018

National team	Year	Apps	Goals
Argentina	2018	3	0
Total		3	0

== Honours ==
Estudiantes

- Copa Argentina: 2023
- Copa de la Liga Profesional: 2024
- Trofeo de Campeones de la Liga Profesional: 2024, 2025
- Primera División: 2025 Clausura

Boca Juniors

- Argentine Primera División: 2026 Liga

● Copa Sudamericana 2026
