= Matías Lugo =

Argentine footballer

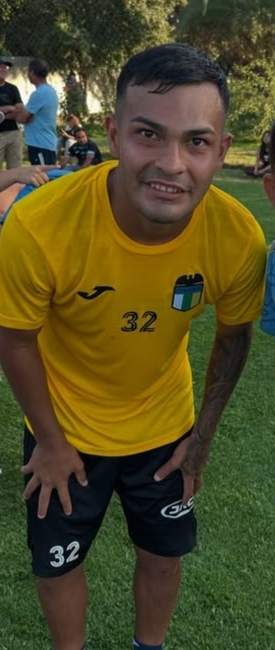
- Lugo with O'Higgins in 2025

Personal information
- Full name: Matías Gonzalo Lugo
- Date of birth: 10 May 2001 (age 25)
- Place of birth: Benavídez, Tigre, Argentina
- Height: 1.70 m (5 ft 7 in)
- Position: Midfielder

Team information
- Current team: Barcelona S.C.
- Number: 32

Youth career
- Argentinos Juniors

Senior career*
Years	Team	Apps	(Gls)
2021–	Argentinos Juniors	1	(0)
2023–2024	→ Estudiantes BA (loan)	65	(1)
2025	→ O'Higgins (loan)	23	(1)
2026–	→ Barcelona S.C. (loan)	19	(0)
- * Club domestic league appearances and goals as of 22 July 2026

Matías Gonzalo Lugo (born 10 May 2001) is an Argentine footballer who plays as a midfielder for Barcelona S.C. on loan from Argentinos Juniors.

== Career ==
Born in Benavídez, Tigre Partido, Argentina, Lugo is a product of Argentinos Juniors and made his professional debut in an Argentine Primera División match against Unión de Santa Fe on 14 August 2022. Subsequently, he was loaned out to Estudiantes de Buenos Aires for the 2023 season. He continued with them during 2024. In 2025, he moved to Chilean Primera División club O'Higgins on a one-year loan.
