= Dylan Gorosito =

Argentine footballer (born 2006)

Personal information
- Full name: Dylan Tomás Gorosito
- Date of birth: 3 February 2006 (age 20)
- Place of birth: Moreno, Buenos Aires, Argentina
- Height: 1.73 m (5 ft 8 in)
- Position: Right-back

Team information
- Current team: Boca Juniors
- Number: 24

Senior career*
Years	Team	Apps	(Gls)
2024–	Boca Juniors	1	(0)

International career^{‡}
2022–2023	Argentina U17	28	(1)
2025–	Argentina U20	8	(0)
Medal record
Men's football
Representing Argentina
FIFA U-20 World Cup
Runner-up	2025 Chile
South American U-20 Championship
Silver medal – second place	2025 Venezuela
South American U-17 Championship
Bronze medal – third place	2023 Ecuador
- * Club domestic league appearances and goals as of 14:02, 19 September 2025 (UTC) ‡ National team caps and goals as of 14:02, 19 September 2025 (UTC)

Dylan Tomás Gorosito (born 3 February 2006) is an Argentine professional footballer who plays as a right-back for Argentine Primera División club Boca Juniors.

== Club career ==
Gorosito arrived at Boca Juniors in 2014 to play in the youth divisions and was promoted to the reserve team in 2024. In February 2024, he signed his first professional contract with Boca until December 2028.

Gorosito made his debut in the Primera División on 21 July 2024, in a 2–2 draw against Defensa y Justicia.

== International career ==
Gorosito participated in 6 of the matches for the Argentina under-17 national team in the 2023 South American U-17 Championship in Ecuador, under the management of Diego Placente. They finished third in the South American Championship and earned a place to play in the U-17 World Cup in Indonesia.

Gorosito was named to their 23-man squad for the 2025 South American U-20 Championship on 6 January 2025. He made the final Argentina U20 squad for the 2025 FIFA U-20 World Cup.

== Honours ==
Boca Juniors Reserves and Academy
- Torneo de Reserva: 2025 Clausura

Boca Juniors

- Copa Sudamericana: 2026
- Argentine Primera División: 2026 Liga
