= Malcom Braida =

Argentine professional footballer

Personal information
- Full name: Malcom Nahuel Braida
- Date of birth: 17 May 1997 (age 29)
- Place of birth: Colonia Caroya, Argentina
- Height: 1.75 m (5 ft 9 in)
- Position: Winger

Team information
- Current team: Boca Juniors
- Number: 27

Youth career
- Bochas Sport
- 2008–2017: Instituto

Senior career*
Years	Team	Apps	(Gls)
2017–2022	Instituto	56	(2)
2020–2021	→ Aldosivi (loan)	41	(5)
2022–2025	San Lorenzo	112	(6)
2025–	Boca Juniors	11	(0)
- * Club domestic league appearances and goals as of 17:30, 16 June 2026 (UTC)

Malcom Nahuel Braida (born 17 May 1997) is an Argentine professional footballer who plays as a winger for Boca Juniors.

== Career ==
After coming through the ranks at Bochas Sport, Braida went to Instituto's academy in 2008. He was moved into their first-team squad under manager Claudio De María, who selected him for matches against Nueva Chicago and Argentinos Juniors in July 2017. Braida subsequently scored two goals, including his career first over Juventud Unida, across ten appearances in the following 2017–18 campaign. A further forty-five appearances would follow across the next two seasons, prior to Braida departing on loan in September 2020 to Primera División side Aldosivi.

On 20 January 2022, Braida joined San Lorenzo on a deal until the end of 2024.

== Personal life ==
Braida is of Italian descent, with his forename Malcom being a tribute to his grandparents.

== Career statistics ==
As of 6 October 2020.

Club statistics
Club	Season	League			Cup		League Cup		Continental		Other		Total	
Club	Season	Division	Apps	Goals	Apps	Goals	Apps	Goals	Apps	Goals	Apps	Goals	Apps	Goals
Instituto	2016–17	Primera B Nacional	2	0	0	0	—		—		0	0	2	0
Instituto	2017–18	Primera B Nacional	9	2	0	0	—		—		1 (Note: Appearance(s) in the Primera B Nacional play-offs)	0	10	2
Instituto	2018–19	Primera B Nacional	23	0	0	0	—		—		0	0	23	0
Instituto	2019-20	Primera B Nacional	21	0	1	0	—		-		0	0	22	0
Instituto	2020-21	Primera B Nacional	0	0	0	0	—		—		0	0	0	0
Instituto	Total		55	2	1	0	—		—		1	0	57	2
Aldosivi (loan)	2020–21	Primera División	0	0	0	0	0	0	—		0	0	0	0
Career total			55	2	1	0	0	0	—		1	0	57	2

== Honours ==
Boca Juniors

- Argentine Primera División: 2026 Liga

=== Individual ===
- Argentine Primera División Team of the Season: 2023
