= Rodolfo Arruabarrena =

Argentine footballer (born 1975)

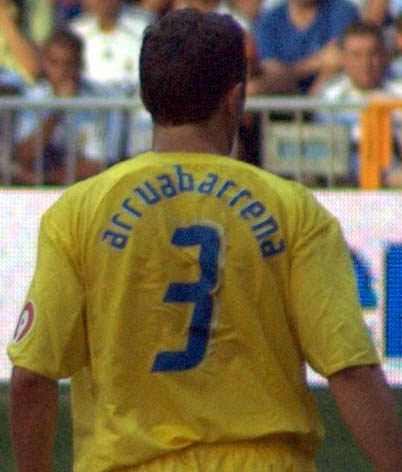
- Arruabarrena playing for Villarreal in 2007

Personal information
- Full name: Rodolfo Martín Arruabarrena
- Date of birth: 20 July 1975 (age 51)
- Place of birth: Marcos Paz, Buenos Aires, Argentina
- Height: 1.78 m (5 ft 10 in)
- Position: Left-back

Team information
- Current team: Boca Juniors (head coach)

Youth career
- 1985–1992: Boca Juniors

Senior career*
| Years | Team | Apps | (Gls) |
| 1993–2000 | Boca Juniors | 178 | (11) |
| 1996 | → Rosario Central (loan) | 15 | (0) |
| 2000–2007 | Villarreal | 219 | (11) |
| 2007–2008 | AEK Athens | 16 | (0) |
| 2008–2010 | Tigre | 67 | (2) |
| 2010 | Universidad Católica | 13 | (0) |

International career
| 1995–2006 | Argentina | 5 | (0) |

Managerial career
- 2011–2012: Tigre
- 2013–2014: Nacional
- 2014–2016: Boca Juniors
- 2016–2018: Al Wasl
- 2018: Al-Rayyan
- 2018–2020: Shabab Al Ahli
- 2020–2021: Pyramids
- 2022–2023: United Arab Emirates
- 2024–2025: Al-Taawoun
- 2026–: Boca Juniors
Medal record
Representing Argentina
Men's football
FIFA Confederations Cup
| Runner-up | 1995 |
- * Club domestic league appearances and goals

Rodolfo Martín Arruabarrena (born 20 July 1975), known as El Vasco (The Basque), is an Argentine professional football manager and former player, who is the manager of the Boca Juniors. A left-back, he spent most of his career with Boca Juniors, where he began his professional career, and Spanish club Villarreal.

== Club career ==
=== Argentina ===
"El Vasco" Arruabarrena (The Basque) debuted professionally in 1993 with Boca Juniors, where he played until 2000, except for the Apertura 1996, when he was lent to Rosario Central for six months. After returning to Boca, he gained a place in the regular squad.

While with Boca, Rodolfo Arruabarrena won the Apertura in 1998 and the Clausura in 1999 Argentine first division tournaments, as well as the Copa Libertadores 2000. He played a total of 178 games for Boca in all competitions, scoring 7 goals.

=== Villarreal ===
From Boca he moved to Spanish Villarreal in mid 2000. Because of his reliability while playing as the team's left-back, he has been the team's captain in several occasions. He holds Villarreal's record of appearances in La Liga, with 178 first division matches with El Submarino Amarillo (as of 9 December 2005).

Arruabarrena's goals in the 2005–06 UEFA Champions League helped to eliminate Scottish club Rangers and Italians Inter Milan to reach the semi-finals in the club's first ever season in the competition.

With Villarreal, he won the UEFA Intertoto Cup in 2003 and 2004, and played 200 league and international matches for the Spanish team (as of 10 September 2006).

=== AEK Athens ===
On 3 May 2007, El Vasco signed a three-year contract with Greek Super League runners-up AEK Athens for €800,000 per year for two years, extendable for a third. According to Arruabarrena, an important role for his decision to continue his career in Greece was played by Lorenzo Serra Ferrer (AEK manager) and Demis Nikolaidis (former star player and later president of his new club who played for Atlético Madrid in 2003–04).

In Rivaldo's debut with AEK, Arruabarrena set up the Brazilian legend to score on a header. Arruabarrena also set up Ismael Blanco to score against Getafe in a UEFA Cup match. Arruabarrena managed to have 25 appearances for AEK in one season but, halfway through the season, he suffered a serious injury.

On 29 July 2008, AEK Athens manager Georgios Donis announced to the press that Arruabarrena was no longer in the team's plans.

== Managerial career ==
=== Early career ===
In December 2010, Arruabarrena was appointed head coach of Tigre with the task of steering the club away from relegation. He surpassed expectations by leading the team to a 63-point campaign and a runner-up finish in the 2012 Clausura. However, after the departure of several key players before the 2012 Torneo Inicial and an ensuing 11-match winless run, he resigned from the position.

In March 2013, Arruabarrena took charge of Uruguayan side Nacional. He stepped down in December of the same year after failing to win the Torneo Apertura title.

=== Boca Juniors ===
In August 2014, Arruabarrena succeeded Carlos Bianchi as head coach of Boca Juniors. During his tenure, he guided the club to a record-setting Copa Libertadores group-stage campaign in 2015 and secured a domestic double by winning both the Argentine Primera División and the Copa Argentina. He was dismissed in February 2016 following a poor start to the season.

=== Middle East ===
Over the following decade, Arruabarrena managed several clubs across the Middle East. In the United Arab Emirates, he led both Al-Wasl and Shabab Al Ahli, winning the UAE League Cup and the President's Cup. He also enjoyed success with Al-Rayyan in Qatar, where he lifted the Qatari Super Cup, and later took charge of Pyramids FC in Egypt and Al-Taawoun in Saudi Arabia.

From 2022 to 2023, he served as head coach of the United Arab Emirates national team.

=== Return to Boca Juniors ===
Arruabarrena began his second spell in charge of Boca Juniors in June 2026. Later that year, he led the club to the top of the Primera División aggregate table and won the Copa Sudamericana, defeating Atlético Mineiro 2-0 in the final to claim the first international trophy of his managerial career.

== International career ==
El Vasco played five matches with the Argentina national team, as well as several with the youth team. Arruabarrena made his first cap against Chile in 1994. He also played some matches in 1995 and one against England on 23 February 2000. Arruabarrena was not called up again for national team duty until September 2006, when Alfio Basile called him for a friendly match against Spain, and then again in February 2007 for another friendly against France. Arruabarrena was also called up for another friendly match against Chile on 18 April 2007 but he was left on the substitutes' bench.

== Career statistics ==
=== Club ===
Appearances and goals by club, season and competition
| Club | Season | League | | | Cup (Note: Includes Copa del Rey, Greek Football Cup and Copa Chile) | | Continental | | Total | |
| Club | Season | Division | Goals | Apps | Goals | Apps | Goals | Apps | Goals | Apps |
|---|---|---|---|---|---|---|---|---|---|---|
| Boca Juniors | 1992–93 | Argentine Primera División | 1 | 0 | — | | — | | 1 | 0 |
| Boca Juniors | 1993–94 | Argentine Primera División | 1 | 0 | — | | 1 (Note: Supercopa Libertadores) | 0 | 2 | 0 |
| Boca Juniors | 1994–95 | Argentine Primera División | 20 | 0 | — | | 2 | 0 | 22 | 0 |
| Boca Juniors | 1995–96 | Argentine Primera División | 8 | 0 | — | | 2 | 0 | 10 | 0 |
| Boca Juniors | 1996–97 | Argentine Primera División | 12 | 0 | — | | — | | 12 | 0 |
| Boca Juniors | 1997–98 | Argentine Primera División | 35 | 6 | — | | 5 | 1 | 40 | 7 |
| Boca Juniors | 1998–99 | Argentine Primera División | 36 | 3 | — | | 5 (Note: Copa Mercosur) | 0 | 41 | 3 |
| Boca Juniors | 1999–2000 | Argentine Primera División | 33 | 2 | — | | 17 (Note: Copa Libertadores) | 5 | 50 | 7 |
| Boca Juniors | Total | | 146 | 11 | — | | 32 | 6 | 178 | 11 |
| Rosario Central (loan) | 1996–97 | Argentine Primera División | 15 | 0 | — | | 5 | 1 | 20 | 1 |
| Villarreal CF | 2000–01 | La Liga | 37 | 2 | — | | — | | 37 | 2 |
| Villarreal CF | 2001–02 | La Liga | 36 | 6 | 1 | 0 | — | | 37 | 6 |
| Villarreal CF | 2002–03 | La Liga | 32 | 0 | — | | 4 (Note: Intertoto Cup) | 1 | 36 | 1 |
| Villarreal CF | 2003–04 | La Liga | 34 | 2 | 3 | 0 | 16 (Note: UEFA Cup) | 0 | 53 | 2 |
| Villarreal CF | 2004–05 | La Liga | 26 | 0 | — | | 17 | 0 | 43 | 0 |
| Villarreal CF | 2005–06 | La Liga | 33 | 0 | — | | 13 (Note: UEFA Champions League) | 2 | 46 | 2 |
| Villarreal CF | 2006–07 | La Liga | 21 | 1 | 2 | 0 | 1 | 0 | 24 | 1 |
| Villarreal CF | Total | | 219 | 11 | 6 | 0 | 51 | 3 | 284 | 14 |
| AEK Athens | 2007–08 | Super League Greece | 16 | 0 | 1 | 0 | 9 | 0 | 26 | 0 |
| Tigre | 2008–09 | Argentine Primera División | 36 | 1 | — | | — | | 36 | 1 |
| Tigre | 2009–10 | Argentine Primera División | 33 | 1 | — | | 2 (Note: Copa Sudamerica) | 0 | 35 | 1 |
| Tigre | Total | | 69 | 2 | — | | 2 | 0 | 71 | 2 |
| Universidad Católica | 2010 | Chilean Primera División | 14 | 0 | 1 | 0 | — | | 15 | 0 |
| Career total | | | 479 | 24 | 8 | 0 | 99 | 10 | 594 | 34 |

=== International ===
Appearances and goals by national team and year
| National team | Year | Apps | Goals |
|---|---|---|---|
| Argentina | 1994 | 2 | 0 |
| Argentina | 1995 | 1 | 0 |
| Argentina | 1996 | 0 | 0 |
| Argentina | 1997 | 0 | 0 |
| Argentina | 1998 | 0 | 0 |
| Argentina | 1999 | 0 | 0 |
| Argentina | 2000 | 1 | 0 |
| Argentina | 2001 | 0 | 0 |
| Argentina | 2002 | 0 | 0 |
| Argentina | 2003 | 0 | 0 |
| Argentina | 2004 | 0 | 0 |
| Argentina | 2005 | 0 | 0 |
| Argentina | 2006 | 1 | 0 |
| Total | | 5 | 0 |

== Managerial statistics ==
As of match played 14 November 2026

| Team | Nat | From | To | Record | | | | | | | |
| Team | Nat | From | To | G | W | D | L | GF | GA | GD | Win % |
|---|---|---|---|---|---|---|---|---|---|---|---|
| Tigre | (Argentina) | 5 January 2011 | 21 October 2012 | 76 | 28 | 26 | 22 | 99 | 86 | +13 | 36.84 |
| Nacional | (Uruguay) | 26 March 2013 | 31 December 2013 | 27 | 16 | 2 | 9 | 45 | 34 | +11 | 59.26 |
| Boca Juniors | (Argentina) | 29 August 2014 | 29 February 2016 | 75 | 47 | 13 | 15 | 122 | 57 | +65 | 62.67 |
| Al Wasl | (United Arab Emirates) | 1 July 2016 | 30 June 2018 | 63 | 37 | 14 | 12 | 130 | 79 | +51 | 58.73 |
| Al-Rayyan | (Qatar) | 5 July 2018 | 8 October 2018 | 9 | 4 | 3 | 2 | 8 | 9 | −1 | 44.44 |
| Shabab Al Ahli | (United Arab Emirates) | 11 October 2018 | 8 March 2020 | 56 | 39 | 8 | 9 | 118 | 48 | +70 | 69.64 |
| Pyramids | (Egypt) | 11 November 2020 | 29 June 2021 | 41 | 18 | 17 | 6 | 57 | 39 | +18 | 43.90 |
| United Arab Emirates | (United Arab Emirates) | 13 February 2022 | 1 July 2023 | 14 | 4 | 3 | 7 | 10 | 19 | −9 | 28.57 |
| Al-Taawoun | (Saudi Arabia) | 6 July 2024 | 9 February 2025 | 29 | 13 | 6 | 10 | 36 | 31 | +5 | 44.83 |
| Boca Juniors | (Argentina) | 18 June 2026 | present | 28 | 17 | 8 | 3 | 45 | 21 | +24 | 60.71 |
| Total | | | | 418 | 223 | 100 | 95 | 670 | 423 | +247 | 53.35 |

== Honours ==
=== Player ===
Boca Juniors

- Argentine Primera División: 1998 Apertura, 1999 Clausura
- Copa Libertadores: 2000

Villarreal

- UEFA Intertoto Cup: 2003, 2004

Universidad Católica

- Chilean Primera División: 2010

Argentina Olympic

- Pan American Games: 1995

=== Manager ===
Boca Juniors

- Argentine Primera División: 2015, 2026 Liga
- Copa Argentina: 2014–15
- Copa Sudamericana: 2026

Al-Rayyan

- Sheikh Jassim Cup: 2018

Shabab Al Ahli

- UAE President's Cup: 2018–19
- UAE League Cup: 2018–19
- UAE Pro League runner-up: 2018–19
