= Tomás Aranda =

Argentine footballer (born 2007)

Personal information
- Full name: Tomás Leandro Aranda
- Date of birth: 9 May 2007 (age 19)
- Place of birth: Ciudadela, Argentina
- Height: 1.72 m (5 ft 8 in)
- Positions: Attacking midfielder; winger

Team information
- Current team: Boca Juniors
- Number: 10

Youth career
- Ituzaingó
- 2018–2026: Boca Juniors

Senior career*
Years	Team	Apps	(Gls)
2026–	Boca Juniors	20	(1)

International career^{‡}
2026–	Argentina U20	1	(0)
2026–	Argentina	1	(0)
- * Club domestic league appearances and goals as of 9 May 2026 ‡ National team caps and goals as of 7 June 2026

Tomás Leandro Aranda (born 9 May 2007) is an Argentine professional footballer who plays as a attacking midfielder or winger for Argentine Primera División club Boca Juniors and the Argentina national team.

== Club career ==
Born in Ciudadela just outside of Buenos Aires, Aranda grew up in Villa Udaondo, where he played for Club Atlético Ituzaingó, before joining Boca Juniors in 2018.

In September 2024, as he had already started playing with the reserve, he signed his first professional contract with Boca Juniors. The following year he led the reserve to a win in the Torneo de Reserva and the Trofeo de Campeones.

Aranda made his professional debut with Boca Juniors in a 2–1 Primera División loss to Estudiantes de La Plata on 28 January 2026.

== International career ==
Aranda is a youth international for Argentina, having first been called to the under-20 team in March 2026. He made his debut on 27 March, starting in a friendly against the United States.

== Honours ==
Boca Juniors

- Copa Sudamericana: 2026
- Argentine Primera División: 2026 Liga
