= Ayrton Costa =

Argentine footballer (born 1999)

Personal information
- Full name: Ayrton Enrique Costa
- Date of birth: 12 July 1999 (age 27)
- Place of birth: Quilmes, Argentina
- Height: 1.79 m (5 ft 10 in)
- Position: Centre-back

Team information
- Current team: Boca Juniors
- Number: 32

Youth career
- 2015–2020: Independiente

Senior career*
Years	Team	Apps	(Gls)
2020–2024	Independiente	54	(3)
2022	→ Platense (loan)	18	(2)
2024–2025	Antwerp	15	(0)
2025–	Boca Juniors	36	(3)
- * Club domestic league appearances and goals as of 17:32, 16 June 2026 (UTC)

Ayrton Enrique Costa (born 12 July 1999) is an Argentine professional footballer who plays as a centre-back for Boca Juniors.

== Career ==
Costa arrived at Independiente in 2015. Five years later, the centre-back made the breakthrough into first-team football under manager Lucas Pusineri. He initially trained with the club in pre-season, notably appearing in a friendly win over Gimnasia y Esgrima. Costa's senior debut occurred on 6 December 2020 in a Copa de la Liga Profesional victory over Defensa y Justicia, as he played eighty-eight minutes before being replaced by Patricio Ostachuk. He penned terms on a contract until December 2022 on 15 December 2020.

On 2 July 2024, Costa signed a four-season contract with Antwerp in Belgium.

On 15 June 2025, a report mentioned that Costa had been denied a visa to participate in the FIFA Club World Cup in the United States due to a robbery case in 2018. Several days later, the decision was reversed and he was granted a special 26 day visa for the tournament.

== Personal life ==
Costa's first name is an ode to Brazilian Formula One driver Ayrton Senna, of whom his grandfather was a fan of. He is of Cape Verdean and Paraguayan descent through one of his grandfathers and one of his grandmothers, respectively.

== Career statistics ==
As of 3 January 2021

Appearances and goals by club, season and competition
Club	Season	League			National cup		League cup		Continental		Other		Total	
Club	Season	Division	Apps	Goals	Apps	Goals	Apps	Goals	Apps	Goals	Apps	Goals	Apps	Goals
Independiente	2020–21 (Note: Soccerway counts Copa de la Liga Profesional appearances as league appearances.)	Argentine Primera División	2	0	0	0	0	0	0	0	0	0	2	0
Career total			2	0	0	0	0	0	0	0	0	0	2	0

== Honours ==
Boca Juniors

- Argentine Primera División: 2026 Liga
