= 2023 U-20 Copa Libertadores final =

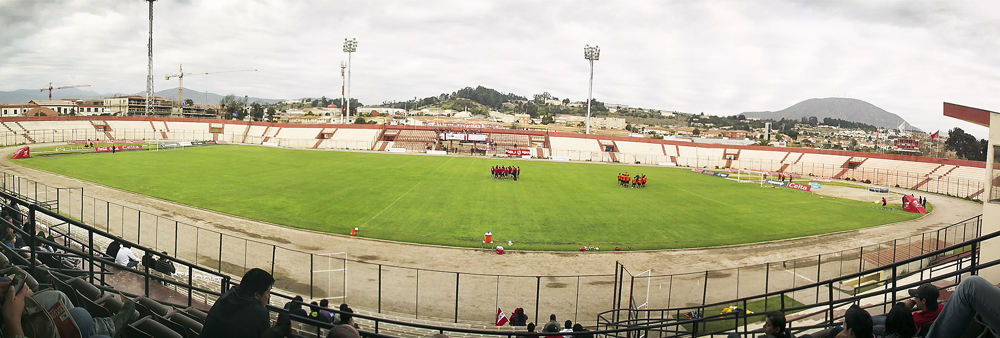
- Estadio La Portada, venue
Boca Juniors	Independiente del Valle
(Argentina)	(Ecuador)
2	1
- Date: 16 July 2023
- Venue: Estadio La Portada, La Serena
- Referee: Jhon Hinestroza (Colombia)

The 2023 U-20 Copa Libertadores final (Spanish: Final de la Copa Libertadores Sub-20 de 2023) was the final of the 7th. edition of the U-20 Copa Libertadores, an under age football competition organised by CONMEBOL. It was contested by Argentine side Boca Juniors and Ecuadorian team Independiente del Valle, and hosted by Estadio La Portada in the city of La Serena, Chile.

Boca Juniors defeated Indpendiente del Valle 2–0 to win their first U-20 Copa Libertadores. (and the second for an Argentine side). Forward Ignacio Rodríguez scored both goals for the Xeneizes.

== Teams ==
Team	Previous final app.
(Argentina) Boca Juniors	2011
(Ecuador) Independiente del Valle	(none)

== Road to the final ==
Boca Juniors		Round	Independiente del Valle	
Opponent	Result	Stage	Opponent	Result
(Uruguay) Defensor Sporting	1–0	Matchday 1	(Paraguay) Cerro Porteño	3–1
(Chile) Huachipato	1–0	Matchday 2	(Colombia) Envigado	1–0
(Brazil) Palmeiras	2–2	Matchday 3	(Bolivia) Always Ready	6–0
(Uruguay) Peñarol	1–0	Semifinals	(Paraguay) Cerro Porteño	1–0

== Match details ==
2023 U-20 Copa Libertadores Final
15:30

Boca Juniors (Argentina)	2–0	(Ecuador) Independiente del Valle
Rodríguez 43', 49'	Report

Estadio La Portada, La Serena
Referee: Jhon Hinestroza (Colombia)

Boca Juniors
Independiente del Valle

GK	1	(Argentina) Sebastián Díaz Robles
DF	4	(Argentina) Natan Acosta
DF	2	(Argentina) Lautaro Di Lollo
DF	6	(Argentina) Valentín Fascendini
DF	3	(Argentina) Nahuel Génez
MF	8	(Argentina) Mauricio Benítez		(substituted off) 73'
MF	5	(Argentina) Santiago Gauna
MF	7	(Argentina) Fabio Sosa	(yellow card) 16'
MF	17	(Argentina) Julián Ceballos
FW	11	(Argentina) Simón Rivero		(substituted off) 79'
FW	19	(Argentina) Ignacio Rodríguez
Substitutions:
MF	16	(Argentina) Román Rodríguez		(substituted on) 73'
MF	10	(Argentina) Lucas Vázquez		(substituted on) 79'
Manager:
(Argentina) Silvio Rudman

GK	1	(Ecuador) Kleber Pinagorte
DF	4	(Ecuador) Garis Mina
DF	2	(Brazil) Thiago Guth
DF	15	(Ecuador) Josué Palacios
DF	54	(Ecuador) Jeampaul Herrera
MF	5	(Ecuador) Youri Ochoa		(substituted off) 63'
MF	8	(Ecuador) Kendry Páez		(substituted off) 53'
MF	10	(Ecuador) Patrick Mercado		(substituted off) 53'
FW	20	(Ecuador) Erick Cabal		(substituted off) 87'
FW	19	(Ecuador) José Klinger
FW	17	(Ecuador) Maelo Rentería	(yellow card) 63'
Substitutions:
FW	55	(Ecuador) Keny Arroyo		(substituted on) 53'
MF		(Ecuador) Luis Hinestroza		(substituted on) 53'
FW	9	(Ecuador) Justin Cuero		(substituted on) 63'
DF	50	(Ecuador) Gipson Preciado		(substituted on) 87'
Manager:
?
