= 2024 U-20 Copa Libertadores =

South American under-20 club football tournament

Copa CONMEBOL Libertadores Sub-20 Uruguay 2024

Tournament details
- Host country: Uruguay
- Dates: 2–17 March 2024
- Teams: 12 (from 10 associations)
- Venues: 2 (in 2 host cities)

Final positions
- Champions: (Brazil) Flamengo (1st title)
- Runners-up: (Argentina) Boca Juniors
- Third place: (Argentina) Rosario Central
- Fourth place: (Ecuador) Aucas

Tournament statistics
- Matches played: 22
- Goals scored: 67 (3.05 per match)
- Top scorer(s): (Brazil) Iago (Brazil) Wallace Yan (4 goals each)

The 2024 U-20 Copa CONMEBOL Libertadores (Spanish: Copa CONMEBOL Libertadores Sub-20 2024) was the 8th edition of the U-20 CONMEBOL Libertadores (also referred to as the U-20 Copa Libertadores), South America's premier under-20 club football tournament organized by CONMEBOL. It was held in Uruguay from 2 to 17 March 2024.

Boca Juniors were the defending champions.

== Teams ==
The competition was contested by 12 teams: the title holders, the youth champions from each of the ten CONMEBOL member associations, and one additional team from the host association.

Association	Team	Qualifying method	Participation	Previous best result
Argentina	Boca Juniors (holders)	2023 U-20 Copa Libertadores champions	4th	Champions (2023)
Argentina	Rosario Central	2023 Cuarta División (U-20) runners-up	1st	—
Bolivia	Always Ready	2023 U-20 Torneo Nacional champions	2nd	Group stage (2023)
Brazil	Flamengo	2023 Campeonato Brasileiro Sub-20 champions	3rd	Third place (2020)
Chile	Colo-Colo	2024 Supercopa Proyección winners	3rd	Group stage (2018, 2020)
Colombia	Águilas Doradas	2023 Supercopa Juvenil champions	1st	—
Ecuador	Aucas	2023 Campeonato Nacional de Categorías Formativas U-19 champions	1st	—
Paraguay	Olimpia	2023 U-19 Torneo Anual champions	1st	—
Peru	Sporting Cristal	2023 Torneo de Promoción y Reserva champions	4th	Group stage (2012, 2020, 2022)
Uruguay (hosts)	Defensor Sporting	2023 Campeonato Uruguayo Juvenil Divisional A U-19 champions	3rd	Runners-up (2012)
Uruguay (hosts)	Montevideo City Torque	2023 Campeonato Uruguayo Juvenil Divisional A U-19 runners-up	1st	—
Venezuela	Academia Puerto Cabello	2023 Liga FUTVE Junior U-20 champions	2nd	Group stage (2020)

1. Argentina (ARG): Since Boca Juniors qualified via the reigning champions' berth and were also champions of the 2023 Cuarta División (U-20), the Argentine berth went to the runners-up Rosario Central.
2. Chile (CHI): Chile's berth was decided in a play-off match between Colo-Colo, the 2023 Campeonato Nacional Proyección Apertura champions, and Palestino, the 2023 Campeonato Nacional Proyección Clausura champions.

=== Squads ===
Players born between 1 January 2004 and 31 December 2008 were eligible to compete in the tournament. Each team could register a maximum of 20 and a minimum of 16 players, including at least 2 goalkeepers (Regulations Articles 47 and 50).

== Venues ==
Uruguay was confirmed as host country of the tournament on 20 December 2023. This will be the second time that Uruguay hosts the tournament having previously done so in 2018.

Colonia del Sacramento and Maldonado were selected as host cities and announced after the draw. Estadio Profesor Alberto Suppici in Colonia hosted the matches of groups A and B matches while Estadio Domingo Burgueño in Maldonado hosted the group C and the final stage matches.

== Draw ==
The draw for the group stage was held on 13 February 2024, 12:00 PYST (UTC−3), at the CONMEBOL headquarters in Luque, Paraguay. The draw was conducted according to the following guidelines:

- The defending champions Boca Juniors were automatically assigned to Group A, position A1.
- The remaining 11 teams were seeded into four pots; one of two teams and three of three teams, based on the final placement of their national association's club in the previous edition of the tournament, in order to be drawn into three groups of four.
- Teams from the two best associations (Argentina and Ecuador) were seeded into Pot 1 and drawn to the first position of groups B or C. The first team drawn was placed into Group B and the second team drawn placed into Group C.
- Teams from the next three associations (Paraguay, Uruguay 1 and Venezuela) were seeded into Pot 2 and drawn to the second position of groups A, B or C.
- Teams from the next three associations (Brazil, Colombia and Chile) were seeded into Pot 3 and drawn to the third position of groups A, B or C.
- Teams from the last two associations (Peru and Bolivia) and the additional team from the host association (Uruguay 2) were seeded into Pot 4 and drawn to the fourth position of groups A, B or C.
- From pots 2, 3 and 4, the first team drawn was placed into Group A, the second team drawn placed into Group B and the final team drawn placed into Group C. Teams from the same association could not be drawn into the same group.

Pot 1	Pot 2	Pot 3	Pot 4
(Argentina) Rosario Central; (Ecuador) Aucas	(Paraguay) Olimpia; (Uruguay) Defensor Sporting; (Venezuela) Academia Puerto Cabello	(Brazil) Flamengo; (Colombia) Águilas Doradas; (Chile) Colo-Colo	(Peru) Sporting Cristal; (Bolivia) Always Ready; (Uruguay) Montevideo City Torque

1. ^{CHI} The identity of the team Chile was not known at the time of the draw.

The draw resulted in the following groups:

Group A
Pos	Team
A1	(Argentina) Boca Juniors
A2	(Venezuela) Academia Puerto Cabello
A3	(Chile) Colo-Colo
A4	(Bolivia) Always Ready

Group B
Pos	Team
B1	(Argentina) Rosario Central
B2	(Paraguay) Olimpia
B3	(Colombia) Águilas Doradas
B4	(Uruguay) Montevideo City Torque

Group C
Pos	Team
C1	(Ecuador) Aucas
C2	(Uruguay) Defensor Sporting
C3	(Brazil) Flamengo
C4	(Peru) Sporting Cristal

== Match officials ==
On 21 February 2024, CONMEBOL announced that its Referee Commission had appointed 11 referees and 22 assistant referees for the tournament. For the first time, a UEFA refereeing team will officiate in the U-20 Copa Libertadores as part of the UEFA–CONMEBOL memorandum of understanding signed in February 2020, which included a referee exchange programme. It will be also the first time that women assistant referees will participate in the tournament.

- (Argentina) Leandro Rey
  - Assistants: José Savorani and Sebastián Raineri
- (Bolivia) Jordy Alemán
  - Assistants: Juan Montaño and Rubén Flores
- (Brazil) Ramon Abatti
  - Assistants: Nailton Sousa and Luanderson de Lima
- (Chile) Francisco Gilabert
  - Assistants: Alan Sandoval and Gabriel Ureta
- (Colombia) Carlos Betancur
  - Assistants: David Fuentes and Mary Blanco
- (Ecuador) Bryan Loayza
  - Assistants: Danny Ávila and David Vacacela
- (Paraguay) Juan López
  - Assistants: Eduardo Britos and Nancy Fernández
- (Peru) Joel Alarcón
  - Assistants: Alberth Alarcón and José Castillo
- (Spain) Guillermo Cuadra Fernández
  - Assistants: Iván Masso and Guadalupe Porras
- (Uruguay) Mathías De Armas
  - Assistants: Pablo Llarena and Agustín Berisso
- (Venezuela) Yender Herrera
  - Assistants: Erizon Nieto and Migdalia Rodríguez

== Group stage ==
The winners of each group and the best runner-up among all groups advanced to the semi-finals.

Tiebreakers

In the group stage, teams were ranked according to points earned (3 points for a win, 1 point for a draw, 0 points for a loss). If tied on points, tiebreakers were applied in the following order (Regulations Articles 20, 21):

1. Head-to-head result in games between tied teams;
  - Head-to-head points in the matches played among the tied teams;
  - Head-to-head goal difference in the matches played among the tied teams;
  - Head-to-head goals scored in the matches played among the tied teams;
2. Goal difference;
3. Goals scored;
4. Fewest number of red cards received;
5. Fewest number of yellow cards received;
6. Drawing of lots.

All match times were local, UYT (UTC−3), as listed by CONMEBOL.

=== Group A ===
Pos	Team	Pld	W	D	L	GF	GA	GD	Pts	Qualification
1	(Argentina) Boca Juniors	3	2	1	0	6	0	+6	7	Semi-finals
2	(Venezuela) Academia Puerto Cabello	3	2	0	1	7	4	+3	6	
3	(Chile) Colo-Colo	3	1	1	1	4	2	+2	4	
4	(Bolivia) Always Ready	3	0	0	3	1	12	−11	0	

Source: CONMEBOL
2 March 2024
15:00

Academia Puerto Cabello (Venezuela)	2–1	(Chile) Colo-Colo
Díaz 1'; Cantillo 48'	Report	Alarcón 50'

Estadio Profesor Alberto Suppici, Colonia
Referee: Juan López (Paraguay)
2 March 2024
18:00

Boca Juniors (Argentina)	4–0	(Bolivia) Always Ready
Di Lollo 11' (pen.), 18', 42'; Mendia 14'	Report

Estadio Profesor Alberto Suppici, Colonia
Referee: Mathías De Armas (Uruguay)

5 March 2024
15:00

Colo-Colo (Chile)	0–0	(Argentina) Boca Juniors
	Report

Estadio Profesor Alberto Suppici, Colonia
Referee: Ramon Abatti (Brazil)
5 March 2024
18:00

Academia Puerto Cabello (Venezuela)	5–1	(Bolivia) Always Ready
Monjes 13', 46'; Osorio 26'; Díaz 27'; Rebolledo 77'	Report	Massi 89'

Estadio Profesor Alberto Suppici, Colonia
Referee: Bryan Loayza (Ecuador)

8 March 2024
15:00

Always Ready (Bolivia)	0–3	(Chile) Colo-Colo
	Report	Alarcón 2'; Hernández 53'; Pinto 83'

Estadio Profesor Alberto Suppici, Colonia
Referee: Mathías De Armas (Uruguay)
8 March 2024
18:00

Boca Juniors (Argentina)	2–0	(Venezuela) Academia Puerto Cabello
Zufiaurre 39', 42'	Report

Estadio Profesor Alberto Suppici, Colonia
Referee: Juan López (Paraguay)

=== Group B ===
Pos	Team	Pld	W	D	L	GF	GA	GD	Pts	Qualification
1	(Argentina) Rosario Central	3	2	0	1	4	3	+1	6	Semi-finals
2	(Paraguay) Olimpia	3	1	1	1	2	1	+1	4	
3	(Uruguay) Montevideo City Torque (H)	3	1	1	1	5	5	0	4	
4	(Colombia) Águilas Doradas	3	1	0	2	5	7	−2	3	

Source: CONMEBOL
(H) Hosts
3 March 2024
15:00

Olimpia (Paraguay)	2–0	(Colombia) Águilas Doradas
Noguera 43'; A. Páez 90+4'	Report

Estadio Profesor Alberto Suppici, Colonia
Referee: Francisco Gilabert (Chile)
3 March 2024
18:00

Rosario Central (Argentina)	2–1	(Uruguay) Montevideo City Torque
Ponce 45'; Salteño 66'	Report	Morales 33' (pen.)

Estadio Profesor Alberto Suppici, Colonia
Referee: Bryan Loayza (Ecuador)

6 March 2024
15:00

Águilas Doradas (Colombia)	2–1	(Argentina) Rosario Central
Mena 29'; Benítez 89'	Report	Cerrudo 45+2' (pen.)

Estadio Profesor Alberto Suppici, Colonia
Referee: Guillermo Cuadra Fernández (Spain)
6 March 2024
18:00

Olimpia (Paraguay)	0–0	(Uruguay) Montevideo City Torque
	Report

Estadio Profesor Alberto Suppici, Colonia
Referee: Joel Alarcón (Peru)

9 March 2024
15:00

Montevideo City Torque (Uruguay)	4–3	(Colombia) Águilas Doradas
Morales 11'; Gonella 80'; Altez 82', 89'	Report	Suárez 27' (pen.); Has. Palacios 47'; Mena 90+1'

Estadio Profesor Alberto Suppici, Colonia
Referee: Francisco Gilabert (Chile)
9 March 2024
18:00

Rosario Central (Argentina)	1–0	(Paraguay) Olimpia
Ponce 71'	Report

Estadio Profesor Alberto Suppici, Colonia
Referee: Ramon Abatti (Brazil)

=== Group C ===
Pos	Team	Pld	W	D	L	GF	GA	GD	Pts	Qualification
1	(Brazil) Flamengo	3	3	0	0	7	2	+5	9	Semi-finals
2	(Ecuador) Aucas	3	2	0	1	8	5	+3	6	Semi-finals
3	(Uruguay) Defensor Sporting (H)	3	1	0	2	4	5	−1	3	
4	(Peru) Sporting Cristal	3	0	0	3	2	9	−7	0	

Source: CONMEBOL
(H) Hosts
4 March 2024
15:00

Aucas (Ecuador)	3–1	(Peru) Sporting Cristal
Conforme 36'; Perlaza 42', 68'	Report	Uculmana 71'

Estadio Domingo Burgueño, Maldonado
Referee: Carlos Betancur (Colombia)
4 March 2024
18:00

Defensor Sporting (Uruguay)	0–1	(Brazil) Flamengo
	Report	Wallace Yan 9'

Estadio Domingo Burgueño, Maldonado
Referee: Leandro Rey (Argentina)

7 March 2024
15:00

Flamengo (Brazil)	2–1	(Ecuador) Aucas
Iago 60'; Wallace Yan 82'	Report	Conforme 58'

Estadio Domingo Burgueño, Maldonado
Referee: Yender Herrera (Venezuela)
7 March 2024
18:00

Defensor Sporting (Uruguay)	2–0	(Peru) Sporting Cristal
Sena 68'; Cambón 85'	Report

Estadio Domingo Burgueño, Maldonado
Referee: Jordy Alemán (Bolivia)

10 March 2024
15:00

Sporting Cristal (Peru)	1–4	(Brazil) Flamengo
Rodríguez 57'	Report	Felipe Teresa 6'; Wallace Yan 9', 23'; Iago 53' (pen.)

Estadio Domingo Burgueño, Maldonado
Referee: Leandro Rey (Argentina)
10 March 2024
18:00

Aucas (Ecuador)	4–2	(Uruguay) Defensor Sporting
Perlaza 35'; Hurtado 51'; Zambrano 56', 83' (pen.)	Report	Jorge 46'; Viudez 78'

Estadio Domingo Burgueño, Maldonado
Referee: Carlos Betancur (Colombia)

=== Ranking of group runners-up ===
Pos	Grp	Team	Pld	W	D	L	GF	GA	GD	Pts	Qualification
1	C	(Ecuador) Aucas	3	2	0	1	8	5	+3	6	Semi-finals
2	A	(Venezuela) Academia Puerto Cabello	3	2	0	1	7	4	+3	6	
3	B	(Paraguay) Olimpia	3	1	1	1	2	1	+1	4	

Source: CONMEBOL
Rules for classification: 1) Points; 2) Goal difference; 3) Goals scored; 4) Red cards; 5) Yellow cards; 6) Drawing of lots (Regulations Article 22).

== Final stage ==
The semi-final matchups were:

- Group A winner vs. Best runner-up
- Group B winner vs. Group C winner

The semi-final winners and losers played in the final and third place match respectively. If tied after full time, a penalty shoot-out would be used to determine the winner (Regulations Article 24).

All match times were local, UYT (UTC−3), as listed by CONMEBOL.

=== Bracket ===
Semi-finals
14 March
(Argentina) Boca Juniors	2
(Ecuador) Aucas	1
14 March
(Argentina) Rosario Central	1
(Brazil) Flamengo	2

Final
17 March
(Argentina) Boca Juniors	1
(Brazil) Flamengo	2
Third place
17 March
(Ecuador) Aucas	1
(Argentina) Rosario Central	2

=== Semi-finals ===
14 March 2024
13:00

Boca Juniors (Argentina)	2–1	(Ecuador) Aucas
Dalmasso 37'; Payal 84'	Report	Di Lollo 88' (o.g.)

Estadio Domingo Burgueño, Maldonado
Referee: Mathías De Armas (Uruguay)

14 March 2024
16:30

Rosario Central (Argentina)	1–2	(Brazil) Flamengo
Moscoloni 20'	Report	Iago 57' (pen.), 72'

Estadio Domingo Burgueño, Maldonado
Referee: Juan López (Paraguay)

=== Third place match ===
17 March 2024
15:00

Aucas (Ecuador)	1–2	(Argentina) Rosario Central
Zambrano 54' (pen.)	Report	Beltrán 41'; Ruiz 90+1'

Estadio Domingo Burgueño, Maldonado
Referee: Yender Herrera (Venezuela)

=== Final ===
17 March 2024
15:00

Boca Juniors (Argentina)	1–2	(Brazil) Flamengo
Rodríguez 5'	Report	Ogundana 24'; Lorran 45+2'

Estadio Domingo Burgueño, Maldonado
Referee: Carlos Betancur (Colombia)

== Goalscorers ==
There were 67 goals scored in 22 matches, for an average of 3.05 goals per match.

4 goals

- (Brazil) Iago (Flamengo)
- (Brazil) Wallace Yan (Flamengo)

3 goals

- (Argentina) Lautaro Di Lollo (Boca Juniors)
- (Ecuador) Ronald Perlaza (Aucas)
- (Ecuador) Cristhoper Zambrano (Aucas)

2 goals

- (Chile) Cristian Alarcón (Colo-Colo)
- (Uruguay) Kevin Altez (Montevideo City Torque)
- (Ecuador) Wilmer Conforme (Aucas)
- (Venezuela) Marlon Díaz (Academia Puerto Cabello)
- (Colombia) Javier Mena (Águilas Doradas)
- (Venezuela) Gabriel Monjes (Academia Puerto Cabello)
- (Uruguay) Bruno Morales (Montevideo City Torque)
- (Argentina) Thiago Ponce (Rosario Central)
- (Argentina) Iker Zufiaurre (Boca Juniors)

1 goal

- (Argentina) Samuel Beltrán (Rosario Central)
- (Colombia) Royner Benítez (Águilas Doradas)
- (Uruguay) Augusto Cambón (Defensor Sporting)
- (Venezuela) Jesús Cantillo (Academia Puerto Cabello)
- (Argentina) Juan Cruz Cerrudo (Rosario Central)
- (Argentina) Santiago Dalmasso (Boca Juniors)
- (Brazil) Felipe Teresa (Flamengo)
- (Uruguay) Ignacio Gonella (Montevideo City Torque)
- (Chile) Leandro Hernández (Colo-Colo)
- (Ecuador) Anthony Hurtado (Aucas)
- (Uruguay) Juan Manuel Jorge (Defensor Sporting)
- (Brazil) Lorran (Flamengo)
- (Bolivia) Deyvi Massi (Always Ready)
- (Argentina) Mateo Mendia (Boca Juniors)
- (Argentina) Lorenzo Moscoloni (Rosario Central)
- (Paraguay) Freddy Noguera (Olimpia)
- (Nigeria) Shola Ogundana (Flamengo)
- (Venezuela) Diego Osorio (Academia Puerto Cabello)
- (Argentina) Juan Cruz Payal (Boca Juniors)
- (Paraguay) Aníbal Páez (Olimpia)
- (Colombia) Hassler Palacios (Águilas Doradas)
- (Chile) Matías Pinto (Colo-Colo)
- (Venezuela) Yeiker Rebolledo (Academia Puerto Cabello)
- (Peru) Mateo Rodríguez (Sporting Cristal)
- (Argentina) Ignacio Rodríguez (Boca Juniors)
- (Argentina) Leonardo Ruiz (Rosario Central)
- (Argentina) Tomás Salteño (Rosario Central)
- (Uruguay) Rodolfo Sena (Defensor Sporting)
- (Colombia) Fabián Suárez (Águilas Doradas)
- (Peru) Yamir Uculmana (Sporting Cristal)
- (Uruguay) Pablo Viudez (Defensor Sporting)

1 own goal

- (Argentina) Lautaro Di Lollo (Boca Juniors, against Aucas)
