= 2024 U-20 Copa Libertadores final =

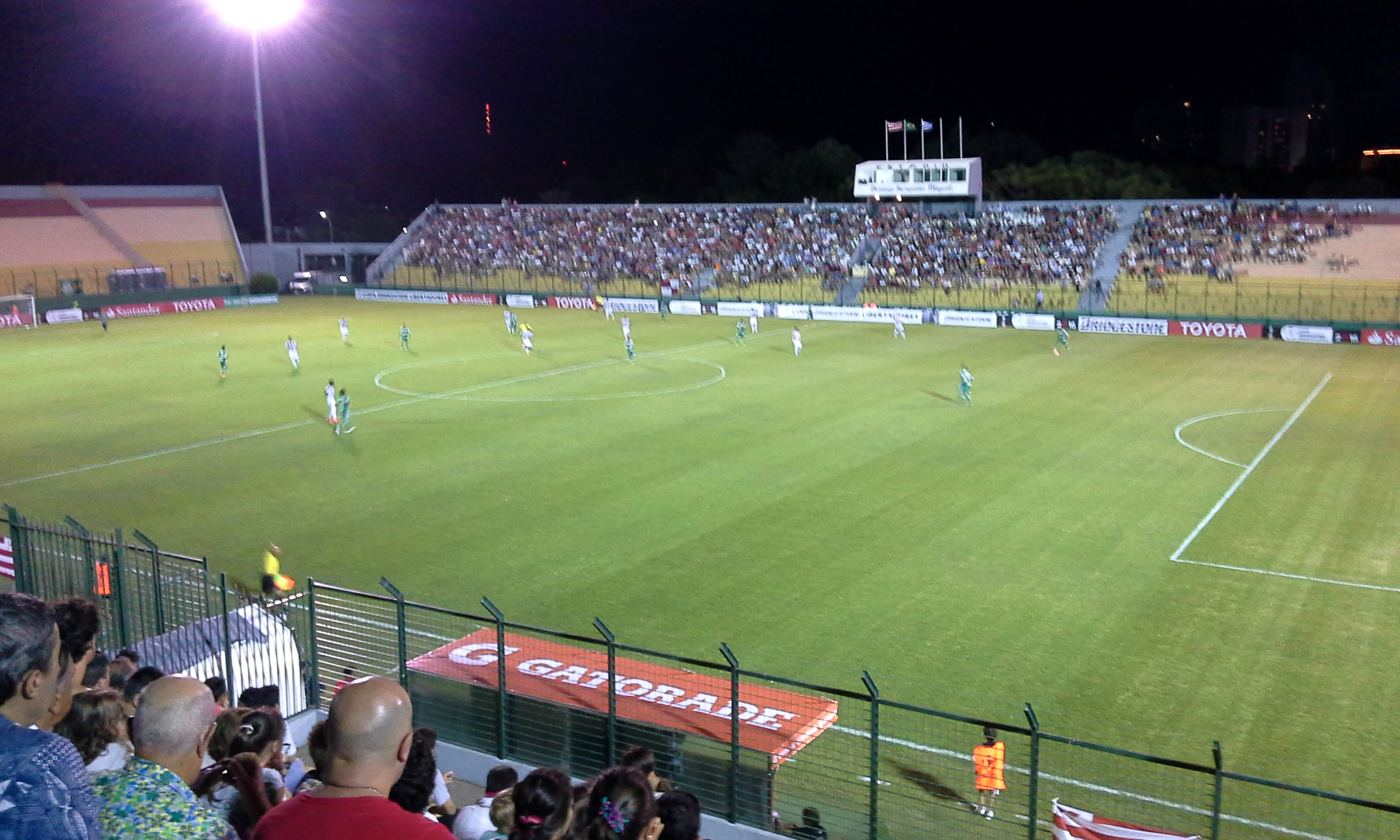
- Domingo Burggueño Stadium, venue
- Event: 2024 U-20 Copa Libertadores
| Boca Juniors | Flamengo |
| (Argentina) | (Brazil) |
| 1 | 2 |
- Date: 17 March 2024
- Venue: Estadio Domingo Burgueño, Maldonado
- Referee: Carlos Betancur (Colombia)

The 2024 U-20 Copa Libertadores final (Spanish: Final de la Copa Libertadores Sub-20 de 2024) was the final of the 8th. edition of the U-20 Copa Libertadores, an under age football competition organised by CONMEBOL. It was contested by Argentine side Boca Juniors (title holder) and Brazilian team Flamengo, and hosted by Estadio Domingo Burgueño in the city of Maldonado, Uruguay.

Flamengo defeated Boca Juniors 2–1 to win their first U-20 Copa Libertadores.

== Teams ==
| Team | Previous final app. |
|---|---|
| (Argentina) Boca Juniors | 2011, **2023** |
| (Brazil) Flamengo | (none) |

- **Bold** indicates winning years

== Road to the final ==
| Boca Juniors | | Round | Flamengo | |
|---|---|---|---|---|
| Opponent | Result | Stage | Opponent | Result |
| (Bolivia) Always Ready | 4–0 | Matchday 1 | (Uruguay) Defensor Sporting | 1–0 |
| (Chile) Colo-Colo | 0–0 | Matchday 2 | (Ecuador) Aucas | 2–1 |
| (Venezuela) Academia P. Cabello | 2–2 | Matchday 3 | (Peru) Sporting Cristal | 4–1 |
| (Ecuador) Aucas | 2–1 | Semifinals | (Argentina) Rosario Central | 2–1 |

== Match details ==
2024 U-20 Copa Libertadores Final
15:30

| Boca Juniors (Argentina) | 1–2 | (Brazil) Flamengo |
|---|---|---|
| Rodríguez 5' | Report | Shola 24'; Lorran 45' |

Estadio Domingo Burgueño, Maldonado
Referee: Carlos Betancur (Colombia)

| **Boca Juniors** | **Flamengo** |

| GK | 12 | (Argentina) Lucas Torlaschi |
| DF | 4 | (Argentina) Thiago Simoni | (yellow card) 68' |
| DF | 2 | (Argentina) Lautaro Di Lollo |
| DF | 13 | (Argentina) Walter Motas | | (substituted off) 46' |
| DF | 14 | (Argentina) Jerónimo Campos |
| MF | 8 | (Argentina) Santiago Dalmasso | | (substituted off) 64' |
| MF | 5 | (Argentina) Milton Delgado |
| MF | 10 | (Argentina) Lucas Vázquez | (yellow card) 41' | (substituted off) 64' |
| FW | 20 | (Argentina) Iker Zufiaurre | | (substituted off) 81' |
| FW | 18 | (Argentina) Juan Cruz Payal |
| FW | 19 | (Argentina) Ignacio Rodríguez | | (substituted off) 81' |
Substitutions:
| DF | 6 | (Argentina) Mateo Mendia | (yellow card) 77' | (substituted on) 46' |
| FW | 9 | (Argentina) Valentino Simoni | | (substituted on) 81' |
| FW | 11 | (Argentina) Yael Ramallo | | (substituted on) 81' |
| MF | 16 | (Argentina) Lucas Galván | | (substituted on) 64' |
| MF | 17 | (Argentina) Julián Ceballos | | (substituted on) 64' |
Manager:
(Argentina) Silvio Rudman

| GK | 1 | (Brazil) Lucas Furtado |
| DF | 13 | (Brazil) Lucyan |
| DF | 3 | (Brazil) Iago Teodoro | | (substituted off) 78' |
| DF | 4 | (Brazil) Carbone |
| DF | 6 | (Brazil) Zé Welinton |
| MF | 25 | (Brazil) Wallace Yan |
| MF | 5 | (Brazil) Rayan Lucas |
| MF | 8 | (Brazil) Caio García | | (substituted off) 90' |
| MF | 26 | (Nigeria) Shola Ogundana | (yellow card) 34' | (substituted off) 78' |
| MF | 10 | (Brazil) Lorran | | (substituted off) 90' |
| FW | 9 | (Brazil) Weliton | | (substituted off) 78' |
Substitutions:
| FW | 11 | (Brazil) Victor Silva | | (substituted on) 90' |
| MF | 14 | (Brazil) Jean Carlos | | (substituted on) 90' |
| DF | 15 | (Brazil) João Victor | | (substituted on) 78' |
| MF | 16 | (Brazil) Daniel Rogério | | (substituted on) 78' |
| FW | 34 | (Brazil) Pedro Estevam | | (substituted on) 78' |
Manager:
(Brazil) Mário Jorge
