= 2023 Under-20 Intercontinental Cup =

Football match

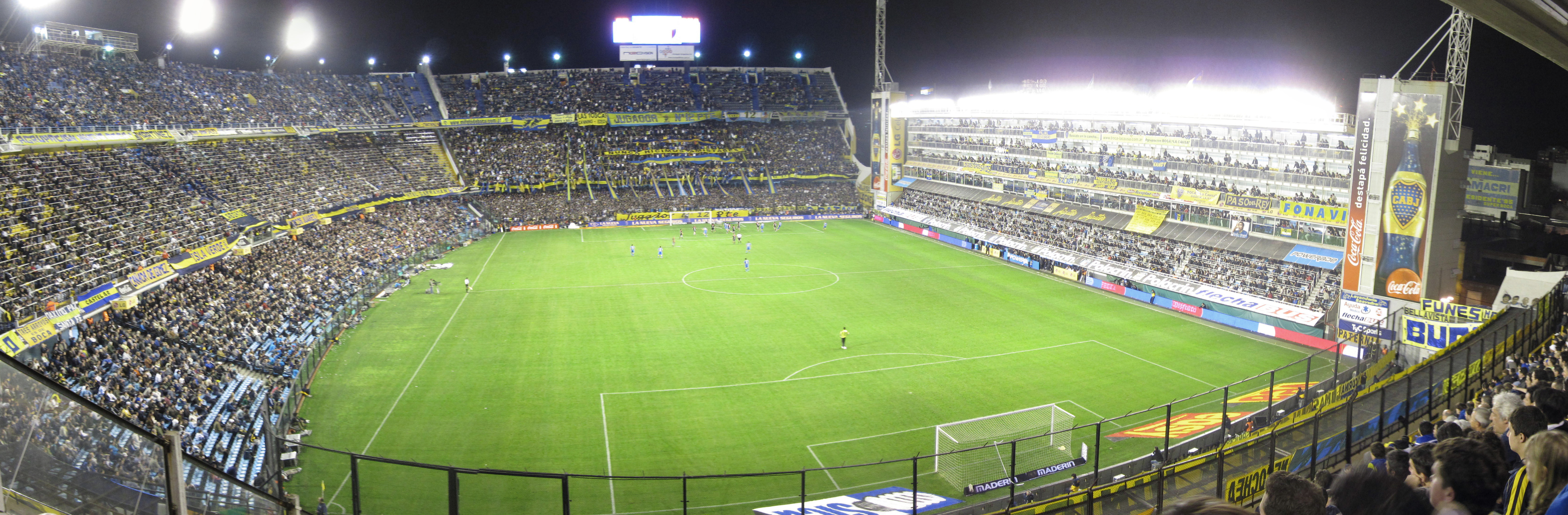
- La Bombonera, venue of the match
Boca Juniors	AZ
(Argentina)	(Netherlands)
1	1
- Boca Juniors won 4–1 on penalties
- Date: 9 September 2023
- Venue: La Bombonera, Buenos Aires
- Referee: Gery Vargas (Bolivia)
- Attendance: 37,386
- Weather: Sunny; 18 °C (64 °F)

The 2023 Under-20 Intercontinental Cup (Spanish: Sub-20 Intercontinental 2023) was the second edition of the UEFA–CONMEBOL Under-20 Intercontinental Cup, a one-off football match organised by CONMEBOL and UEFA between the winners of the U-20 Copa Libertadores and UEFA Youth League. As host confederation, CONMEBOL was in charge of the main organization of this edition.

The match was played on 9 September 2023 at La Bombonera stadium in Buenos Aires, Argentina, between the Argentine team Boca Juniors, the 2023 U-20 Copa Libertadores champions, and Dutch team AZ, the 2022–23 UEFA Youth League champions.

With an attendance of near 38,000 fans at "La Bombonera", Boca Juniors defeated AZ 4–1 on penalties to win their first U-20 Intercontinental title. Boca Juniors goalkeeper Sebastián Díaz Robles stopped two penalties during the shoot-out.

== Teams ==
Team	Qualification
(Argentina) Boca Juniors	2023 U-20 Copa Libertadores champions
(Netherlands) AZ	2022–23 UEFA Youth League champions

== Pre-match ==
=== Officials ===
The refereeing team was appointed by the Referees Committees of CONMEBOL and UEFA; only referees in the FIFA International Referees List were eligible (Regulations Articles 28 and 29). On 4 September 2023, CONMEBOL announced the refereeing team with Bolivian official Gery Vargas as the referee for the match. Vargas is a FIFA referee since 2012. He was joined by three of his fellow countrymen, including assistant referees José Antelo and Edwar Saavedra, with Ivo Méndez serving as the fourth official. Ángelo Hermosilla acted as the video assistant referee (VAR) and Alejandro Molina was the assistant VAR official (AVAR), both from Chile.

=== Squads ===
Each team had to submit their list of 22 players (including at least two goalkeepers) to its respective confederation by 5 September 2023, 19:00 UTC−3 (ART) or 24:00 UTC+2 (UTC+2), as appropriate. Only players born on or after 1 January 2003 were eligible to compete. Teams were permitted to make player replacements in cases of serious injuries up to 24 hours prior the start of the match, provided that it was approved by the CONMEBOL Chief Medical Officer and the team doctor concerned (Regulations Articles 26 and 27).

AZ announced its squad on 5 September 2023.

== Match ==
=== Details ===
9 September 2023
16:00 UTC−3

Boca Juniors (Argentina)	1–1	(Netherlands) AZ
Mastoras 58' (o.g.)	CONMEBOL; UEFA	Kwakman 42'
Penalties
Génez (penalty scored); Di Lollo (penalty scored); Acosta (penalty scored); Fascendini (penalty scored)	4–1	(penalty scored) Goes; (penalty missed) Dekker; (penalty missed) Smit

La Bombonera, Buenos Aires
Attendance: 37,386
Referee: Gery Vargas (Bolivia)

Boca Juniors	AZ

GK	1	(Argentina) Sebastián Díaz Robles
RB	4	(Argentina) Natan Acosta	(yellow card) 89'
CB	2	(Argentina) Lautaro Di Lollo	(yellow card) 87'
CB	6	(Argentina) Valentín Fascendini
LB	3	(Argentina) Nahuel Génez (c)
DM	5	(Argentina) Santiago Gauna	(yellow card) 82'
CM	8	(Argentina) Mauricio Benítez		(substituted off) 68'
CM	17	(Argentina) Julián Ceballos
RF	20	(Argentina) Jabes Saralegui		(substituted off) 73'
CF	19	(Uruguay) Ignacio Rodríguez		(substituted off) 73'
LF	11	(Argentina) Simón Rivero		(substituted off) 80'
Substitutes:
GK	12	(Argentina) Lucas Torlaschi
DF	13	(Argentina) Thomas Arrieta
DF	14	(Argentina) Mateo Mendía
DF	15	(Argentina) Iván Vaquero
MF	7	(Argentina) Fabio Sosa
MF	10	(Argentina) Lucas Vázquez		(substituted on) 80'
MF	16	(Argentina) Román Rodríguez	(yellow card) 76'	(substituted on) 73'
MF	18	(Argentina) Yael Ramallo		(substituted on) 68'
MF	22	(Argentina) Tomás Bustos
FW	9	(Argentina) Bruno Cabral
FW	21	(Argentina) Valentino Simoni		(substituted on) 73'
Manager:
(Argentina) Silvio Rudman

GK	1	(Netherlands) Rome-Jayden Owusu-Oduro
CB	3	(Netherlands) Wouter Goes (c)	(yellow card) 87'
CB	4	(Netherlands) Maxim Dekker
CB	8	(Netherlands) Lewis Schouten
DM	6	(Netherlands) Nick Twisk		(substituted off) 18'
RM	12	(Netherlands) Enoch Mastoras		(substituted off) 62'
LM	14	(Netherlands) Finn Stam	(yellow card) 86'
AM	10	(Netherlands) Dave Kwakman
RF	7	(Netherlands) Jayden Addai		(substituted off) 84'
CF	9	(Netherlands) Mexx Meerdink
LF	11	(Netherlands) Ernest Poku
Substitutes:
GK	22	(Netherlands) Tristan Kuijsten
GK	33	(Netherlands) Arouna Kabba
DF	2	(Netherlands) Jurre van Aken		(substituted on) 62'
DF	5	(Netherlands) Sem Dekkers
DF	15	(Netherlands) Jeremiah Esajas
DF	16	(Netherlands) Loek Postma	(yellow card) 26'	(substituted on) 18' (substituted off) 46'
MF	18	(Netherlands) Tom Kerssens
MF	24	(Netherlands) Kees Smit	(yellow card) 90+1'	(substituted on) 46'
MF	25	(Netherlands) Job Kalisvaart
FW	19	(Netherlands) Nick Koster		(substituted on) 84'
FW	26	(Netherlands) Damienus Reverson
Manager:
(Netherlands) Jan Sierksma

Assistant referees:
José Antelo (Bolivia)
Edwar Saavedra (Bolivia)
Fourth official:
Ivo Méndez (Bolivia)
Video assistant referee:
Ángelo Hermosilla (Chile)
Assistant video assistant referee:
Alejandro Molina (Chile)

Match rules:

- 90 minutes
- Extra time would not be played
- Penalty shoot-out if tied after 90 minutes
- Eleven named substitutes
- Maximum of five substitutions (Note: Each team was given only three opportunities to make substitutions, excluding substitutions made at half-time.)
