= 2023 U-20 Copa Libertadores =

South American under-20 club football tournament

Copa CONMEBOL Libertadores Sub-20 Chile 2023

Tournament details
- Host country: Chile
- Dates: 1–16 July 2023
- Teams: 12 (from 10 associations)
- Venue: 2 (in 2 host cities)

Final positions
- Champions: (Argentina) Boca Juniors (1st title)
- Runners-up: (Ecuador) Independiente del Valle
- Third place: (Paraguay) Cerro Porteño
- Fourth place: (Uruguay) Peñarol

Tournament statistics
- Matches played: 22
- Goals scored: 65 (2.95 per match)
- Top scorer(s): (Uruguay) Santiago Díaz (Ecuador) Maelo Rentería (4 goals each)

The 2023 U-20 Copa CONMEBOL Libertadores (Spanish: Copa CONMEBOL Libertadores Sub-20 2023) was the 7th edition of the U-20 CONMEBOL Libertadores (also referred to as the U-20 Copa Libertadores), South America's premier under-20 club football tournament organized by CONMEBOL. It was held in Chile from 1 to 16 July 2023.

Peñarol were the defending champions, having won the 2022 tournament, but were unable to retain their title after losing to Boca Juniors in the semi-finals, leading them to play the third place match against Cerro Porteño, which they also lost but on penalties. Boca Juniors defeated Independiente del Valle 2–0 in the final to win their first U-20 Copa Libertadores title. As winners of the 2023 U-20 Copa Libertadores, Boca Juniors earned the right to play against AZ, the winners of the 2022–23 UEFA Youth League, in the 2023 Under-20 Intercontinental Cup.

== Teams ==
The competition was contested by 12 teams: the title holders, the youth champions from each of the ten CONMEBOL member associations, and one additional team from the host association.

| Association | Team | Qualifying method | Apps | Previous best result |
|---|---|---|---|---|
| Argentina | Boca Juniors | 2022 Cuarta División (U-20) champions | 3rd | Runners-up (2011) |
| Bolivia | Always Ready | 2023 U-20 Copa Bolivia champions | 1st | — |
| Brazil | Palmeiras | 2022 Supercopa do Brasil Sub-20 champions | 1st | — |
| Chile (hosts) | O'Higgins (Chile 1) | 2022 Campeonato Nacional Proyección Apertura champions | 1st | — |
| Chile (hosts) | Huachipato (Chile 2) | 2022 Campeonato Nacional Proyección Clausura champions | 2nd | Group stage (2016 |
| Colombia | Envigado | 2022 Supercopa Juvenil champions | 1st | — |
| Ecuador | Independiente del Valle | 2022 Campeonato Nacional de Categorías Formativas U-19 champions | 7th | Champions (2020) |
| Paraguay | Cerro Porteño | 2023 U-20 Copa Libertadores qualifying play-off winners | 4th | Quarter-finals (2012) |
| Peru | Alianza Lima | 2022 Torneo de Promoción y Reserva champions | 3rd | Fourth place (2011) |
| Uruguay | Peñarol (holders) | 2022 U-20 Copa Libertadores champions | 2nd | Champions (2022) |
| Uruguay | Defensor Sporting | 2022 Campeonato Uruguayo Juvenil Divisional A U-19 runners-up | 2nd | Runners-up (2012) |
| Venezuela | Caracas | 2022 Liga FUTVE Junior U-20 champions | 3rd | Fourth place (2022) |

1. Brazil (BRA): The 2022 Supercopa do Brasil Sub-20 was to be played between the winners of the 2022 Campeonato Brasileiro Sub-20 and the 2022 Copa do Brasil Sub-20, however, Palmeiras were directly proclaimed champions of the Supercopa as it had won both the Campeonato Brasileiro and the Copa do Brasil, thus securing the Brazilian berth reserved for the Supercopa champions.
2. Paraguay (PAR): Paraguay's berth was decided in a final match between Olimpia, 2022 U-19 Torneo Apertura champions, and Cerro Porteño, 2022 U-19 Torneo Clausura champions.

=== Squads ===
Players born between 1 January 2003 and 31 December 2007 were eligible to compete in the tournament. Each team could register a maximum of 20 and a minimum of 16 players, including at least 2 goalkeepers (Regulations Articles 47 and 50).

== Venues ==
Chile was named as host country of the tournament at the CONMEBOL Council meeting held on 30 September 2022. It was the first time that Chile hosted the tournament.

Coquimbo and La Serena were selected as host cities, with Estadio Francisco Sánchez Rumoroso and Estadio La Portada as the venues, respectively. The group stage matches were played at both venues, while the final stage matches were played entirely at Estadio La Portada.

== Draw ==
The draw was held on 1 June 2023, 12:00 PYST (UTC−4), at the CONMEBOL headquarters in Luque, Paraguay. The draw was conducted according to the following guidelines:

- The defending champions Peñarol were automatically assigned to position A1 in the group stage.
- The remaining 11 teams were seeded into four pots; one of two teams and three of three teams, based on the final placement of their national association's club in the previous edition of the tournament, in order to be drawn into three groups of four.
- Teams from the two best associations (Uruguay and Ecuador) were seeded into Pot 1 and drawn to the first position of groups B or C. The first team drawn was placed into Group B, the second team drawn placed into Group C.
- Teams from the next three associations (Paraguay, Venezuela and Argentina) were seeded into Pot 2 and drawn to the second position of groups A, B or C.
- Teams from the next three associations (Colombia, Peru, and Brazil) were seeded into Pot 3 and drawn to the third position of groups A, B or C.
- Teams from the last two associations (Chile 1 and Bolivia) and the additional team from the host association (Chile 2) were seeded into Pot 4 and drawn to the fourth position of groups A, B or C.
- From pots 2, 3 and 4, the first team drawn was placed into Group A, the second team drawn placed into Group B and the final team drawn placed into Group C. Teams from the same association could not be drawn into the same group.

| Pot 1 | Pot 2 | Pot 3 | Pot 4 |
|---|---|---|---|
| (Uruguay) Defensor Sporting; (Ecuador) Independiente del Valle | (Paraguay) Cerro Porteño; (Venezuela) Caracas; (Argentina) Boca Juniors | (Colombia) Envigado; (Peru) Alianza Lima; (Brazil) Palmeiras | (Chile) O'Higgins; (Bolivia) Always Ready; (Chile) Huachipato |

The draw resulted in the following groups:

Group A
| Pos | Team |
|---|---|
| A1 | (Uruguay) Peñarol |
| A2 | (Venezuela) Caracas |
| A3 | (Peru) Alianza Lima |
| A4 | (Chile) O'Higgins |

Group B
| Pos | Team |
|---|---|
| B1 | (Ecuador) Independiente del Valle |
| B2 | (Paraguay) Cerro Porteño |
| B3 | (Colombia) Envigado |
| B4 | (Bolivia) Always Ready |

Group C
| Pos | Team |
|---|---|
| C1 | (Uruguay) Defensor Sporting |
| C2 | (Argentina) Boca Juniors |
| C3 | (Brazil) Palmeiras |
| C4 | (Chile) Huachipato |

== Match officials ==
On 15 June 2023, CONMEBOL informed to its member associations the referees appointed for the tournament.

- (Argentina) Pablo Echavarría
  - Assistants: Cristian Navarro and José Savorani
- (Bolivia) Jordy Alemán
  - Assistants: Carlos Tapia, Roger Orellana and Rubén Flores
- (Brazil) Paulo Zanovelli
  - Assistants: Nailton Sousa and Luanderson de Lima
- (Chile) Francisco Gilabert
  - Assistants: Edson Cisternas and Alan Sandoval
- (Colombia) Jhon Hinestroza and Bismark Santiago
  - Assistants: Miguel Roldán and David Fuentes
- (Ecuador) Alex Cajas
  - Assistants: Andrés Tola, Danny Ávila and Edison Vázquez
- (Peru) Edwin Ordóñez and Joel Alarcón
  - Assistants: Stephen Atoche and Alberth Alarcón
- (Uruguay) Leodán González
  - Assistants: Horacio Ferreiro and Santiago Fernández
- (Venezuela) José Uzcátegui
  - Assistants: Alberto Ponte, Freiker Colmenárez and Erizon Nieto

== Group stage ==
The winners of each group and the best runner-up among all groups advanced to the semi-finals.

Tiebreakers

In the group stage, teams were ranked according to points earned (3 points for a win, 1 point for a draw, 0 points for a loss). If tied on points, tiebreakers were applied in the following order (Regulations Articles 20, 21):

1. Head-to-head result in games between tied teams;
  - Head-to-head points in the matches played among the tied teams;
  - Head-to-head goal difference in the matches played among the tied teams;
  - Head-to-head goals scored in the matches played among the tied teams;
2. Goal difference;
3. Goals scored;
4. Fewest number of red cards received;
5. Fewest number of yellow cards received;
6. Drawing of lots.

All match times were in CLT (UTC−4), as listed by CONMEBOL.

=== Group A ===
| Pos | Team | Pld | W | D | L | GF | GA | GD | Pts | Qualification |
|---|---|---|---|---|---|---|---|---|---|---|
| 1 | (Uruguay) Peñarol | 3 | 3 | 0 | 0 | 11 | 3 | +8 | 9 | Semi-finals |
| 2 | (Venezuela) Caracas | 3 | 2 | 0 | 1 | 8 | 6 | +2 | 6 | |
| 3 | (Chile) O'Higgins (H) | 3 | 0 | 1 | 2 | 2 | 6 | −4 | 1 | |
| 4 | (Peru) Alianza Lima | 3 | 0 | 1 | 2 | 1 | 7 | −6 | 1 | |

Source: CONMEBOL
(H) Hosts
1 July 2023
15:00

| Alianza Lima (Peru) | 0–0 | (Chile) O'Higgins |
|---|---|---|
| | Report |

Estadio Francisco Sánchez Rumoroso, Coquimbo
Referee: Alex Cajas (Ecuador)
1 July 2023
18:00

| Peñarol (Uruguay) | 5–1 | (Venezuela) Caracas |
|---|---|---|
| De Ritis 4'; Díaz 36'; Nongoy 38'; De Armas 40'; Homenchenko 45' | Report | Jiménez 54' (pen.) |

Estadio Francisco Sánchez Rumoroso, Coquimbo
Referee: Paulo Zanovelli (Brazil)

4 July 2023
15:00

| Caracas (Venezuela) | 4–1 | (Chile) O'Higgins |
|---|---|---|
| Sequera 30'; Jiménez 42'; Reinoso 79'; Albizo 81' | Report | Maturana 27' |

Estadio La Portada, La Serena
Referee: Jordy Alemán (Bolivia)
4 July 2023
18:00

| Peñarol (Uruguay) | 4–1 | (Peru) Alianza Lima |
|---|---|---|
| Díaz 3', 24', 67'; Ferreira 52' | Report | Aranda 52' |

Estadio La Portada, La Serena
Referee: Bismark Santiago (Colombia)

7 July 2023
15:00

| O'Higgins (Chile) | 1–2 | (Uruguay) Peñarol |
|---|---|---|
| Calderón 28' | Report | Correa 2'; Madruga 62' |

Estadio La Portada, La Serena
Referee: Pablo Echevarría (Argentina)
7 July 2023
18:00

| Caracas (Venezuela) | 3–0 | (Peru) Alianza Lima |
|---|---|---|
| Sequera 5'; Padilla 55'; Jiménez 89' | Report |

Estadio La Portada, La Serena
Referee: Jhon Hinestroza (Colombia)

=== Group B ===
| Pos | Team | Pld | W | D | L | GF | GA | GD | Pts | Qualification |
|---|---|---|---|---|---|---|---|---|---|---|
| 1 | (Ecuador) Independiente del Valle | 3 | 3 | 0 | 0 | 10 | 1 | +9 | 9 | Semi-finals |
| 2 | (Paraguay) Cerro Porteño | 3 | 2 | 0 | 1 | 7 | 4 | +3 | 6 | Semi-finals |
| 3 | (Colombia) Envigado | 3 | 1 | 0 | 2 | 1 | 3 | −2 | 3 | |
| 4 | (Bolivia) Always Ready | 3 | 0 | 0 | 3 | 1 | 11 | −10 | 0 | |

Source: CONMEBOL
2 July 2023
15:00

| Independiente del Valle (Ecuador) | 3–1 | (Paraguay) Cerro Porteño |
|---|---|---|
| Klinger 27'; Mercado 40' (pen.); Ochoa 71' | Report | Fariña 54' |

Estadio La Portada, La Serena
Referee: Leodán González (Uruguay)
2 July 2023
18:00

| Envigado (Colombia) | 1–0 | (Bolivia) Always Ready |
|---|---|---|
| España 78' | Report |

Estadio La Portada, La Serena
Referee: Francisco Gilabert (Chile)

5 July 2023
15:00

| Independiente del Valle (Ecuador) | 1–0 | (Colombia) Envigado |
|---|---|---|
| Klinger 28' | Report |

Estadio Francisco Sánchez Rumoroso, Coquimbo
Referee: Paulo Zanovelli (Brazil)
5 July 2023
18:00

| Cerro Porteño (Paraguay) | 4–1 | (Bolivia) Always Ready |
|---|---|---|
| Aguilera 21'; Traoré 45+3'; Arce 49'; Diarra 90+4' | Report | Paniagua 69' |

Estadio Francisco Sánchez Rumoroso, Coquimbo
Referee: Pablo Echavarría (Argentina)

8 July 2023
15:00

| Always Ready (Bolivia) | 0–6 | (Ecuador) Independiente del Valle |
|---|---|---|
| | Report | Ochoa 7'; Rentería 44', 45+2', 74'; Páez 48'; Arroyo 63' |

Estadio Francisco Sánchez Rumoroso, Coquimbo
Referee: José Uzcátegui (Venezuela)
8 July 2023
18:00

| Cerro Porteño (Paraguay) | 2–0 | (Colombia) Envigado |
|---|---|---|
| Arce 40'; Giménez 79' | Report |

Estadio Francisco Sánchez Rumoroso, Coquimbo
Referee: Francisco Gilabert (Chile)

=== Group C ===
| Pos | Team | Pld | W | D | L | GF | GA | GD | Pts | Qualification |
|---|---|---|---|---|---|---|---|---|---|---|
| 1 | (Argentina) Boca Juniors | 3 | 2 | 1 | 0 | 4 | 2 | +2 | 7 | Semi-finals |
| 2 | (Brazil) Palmeiras | 3 | 1 | 2 | 0 | 6 | 5 | +1 | 5 | |
| 3 | (Uruguay) Defensor Sporting | 3 | 1 | 0 | 2 | 4 | 3 | +1 | 3 | |
| 4 | (Chile) Huachipato (H) | 3 | 0 | 1 | 2 | 2 | 6 | −4 | 1 | |

Source: CONMEBOL
(H) Hosts
3 July 2023
15:00

| Palmeiras (Brazil) | 2–2 | (Chile) Huachipato |
|---|---|---|
| Thalys 28'; Allan 32' (pen.) | Report | Gutiérrez 17', 89' |

Estadio Francisco Sánchez Rumoroso, Coquimbo
Referee: Edwin Ordóñez (Peru)
3 July 2023
18:00

| Defensor Sporting (Uruguay) | 0–1 | (Argentina) Boca Juniors |
|---|---|---|
| | Report | Benítez 20' |

Estadio Francisco Sánchez Rumoroso, Coquimbo
Referee: Jhon Hinestroza (Colombia)

6 July 2023
15:00

| Boca Juniors (Argentina) | 1–0 | (Chile) Huachipato |
|---|---|---|
| Di Lollo 16' | Report |

Estadio La Portada, La Serena
Referee: Dilio Rodríguez (Bolivia)
6 July 2023
18:00

| Defensor Sporting (Uruguay) | 1–2 | (Brazil) Palmeiras |
|---|---|---|
| Copelotti 13' | Report | Thalys 37'; Gilberto Júnior 90+3' |

Estadio La Portada, La Serena
Referee: Alex Cajas (Ecuador)

9 July 2023
15:00

| Huachipato (Chile) | 0–3 | (Uruguay) Defensor Sporting |
|---|---|---|
| | Report | Lima 28'; Cabrera 44'; Copelotti 72' |

Estadio Francisco Sánchez Rumoroso, Coquimbo
Referee: Edwin Ordóñez (Peru)
9 July 2023
18:00

| Boca Juniors (Argentina) | 2–2 | (Brazil) Palmeiras |
|---|---|---|
| Benítez 12'; Génez 55' | Report | Thalys 84'; Estêvão 86' |

Estadio Francisco Sánchez Rumoroso, Coquimbo
Referee: Bismark Santiago (Colombia)

=== Ranking of group runners-up ===
| Pos | Grp | Team | Pld | W | D | L | GF | GA | GD | Pts | Qualification |
|---|---|---|---|---|---|---|---|---|---|---|---|
| 1 | B | (Paraguay) Cerro Porteño | 3 | 2 | 0 | 1 | 7 | 4 | +3 | 6 | Semi-finals |
| 2 | A | (Venezuela) Caracas | 3 | 2 | 0 | 1 | 8 | 6 | +2 | 6 | |
| 3 | C | (Brazil) Palmeiras | 3 | 1 | 2 | 0 | 6 | 5 | +1 | 5 | |

Source: CONMEBOL
Rules for classification: 1) Points; 2) Goal difference; 3) Goals scored; 4) Red cards received; 5) Yellow cards received; 6) Drawing of lots (Regulations Article 22).

== Final stage ==
The final stage consisted of the semi-finals, the third place match and the final. All the matches were played with the use of the video assistant referee (VAR).

The semi-final matchups were:

- Group A winner vs. Group C winner
- Group B winner vs. Best runner-up

The semi-final winners and losers played in the final and third place match respectively. If tied after full time, extra time would not be played, and a penalty shoot-out would be used to determine the winner (Regulations Article 22).

=== Bracket ===
Semi-finals
13 July
(Uruguay) Peñarol | 0
(Argentina) Boca Juniors | 1
13 July
(Ecuador) Independiente del Valle | 1
(Paraguay) Cerro Porteño | 0

Final
16 July
(Argentina) Boca Juniors | 2
(Ecuador) Independiente del Valle | 0
Third place
16 July
(Uruguay) Peñarol | 2 (2)
(Paraguay) Cerro Porteño (p) | 2 (4)

=== Semi-finals ===
13 July 2023
14:30

| Peñarol (Uruguay) | 0–1 | (Argentina) Boca Juniors |
|---|---|---|
| | Report | Benítez 45+1' |

Estadio La Portada, La Serena
Referee: Paulo Zanovelli (Brazil)

13 July 2023
18:00

| Independiente del Valle (Ecuador) | 1–0 | (Paraguay) Cerro Porteño |
|---|---|---|
| Rentería 90+1' (pen.) | Report |

Estadio La Portada, La Serena
Referee: Edwin Ordóñez (Peru)

=== Third place match ===
16 July 2023
12:00 (Note: The third place match and the final, originally scheduled at 14:30 and 18:00 local time (UTC−4), were re-scheduled to 12:00 and 15:30, respectively.)

| Peñarol (Uruguay) | 2–2 | (Paraguay) Cerro Porteño |
|---|---|---|
| De Armas 53'; Umpiérrez 78' | Report | Portillo 44'; Giménez 76' |
Penalties
| Díaz (penalty missed); Rodríguez (penalty scored); Umpiérrez (penalty missed); Nongoy (penalty scored) | 2–4 | (penalty missed) Arce; (penalty scored) Prieto; (penalty scored) Núñez; (penalty scored) Diarra; (penalty scored) Fariña |

Estadio La Portada, La Serena
Referee: Pablo Echevarría (Argentina)

=== Final ===
16 July 2023
15:30

| Boca Juniors (Argentina) | 2–0 | (Ecuador) Independiente del Valle |
|---|---|---|
| Rodríguez 44', 48' | Report |

Estadio La Portada, La Serena
Referee: Jhon Hinestroza (Colombia)

== Goalscorers ==
There were 65 goals scored in 22 matches, for an average of 2.95 goals per match.

4 goals

- (Uruguay) Santiago Díaz (Peñarol)
- (Ecuador) Maelo Rentería (Independiente del Valle)

3 goals

- (Argentina) Mauricio Benítez (Boca Juniors)
- (Venezuela) Néstor Jiménez (Caracas)
- (Brazil) Thalys (Palmeiras)

2 goals

- (Paraguay) Fabricio Arce (Cerro Porteño)
- (Uruguay) Matteo Copelotti (Defensor Sporting)
- (Uruguay) Nahuel De Armas (Peñarol)
- (Paraguay) Juan José Giménez (Cerro Porteño)
- (Chile) Maximiliano Gutiérrez (Huachipato)
- (Ecuador) José Klinger (Independiente del Valle)
- (Ecuador) Youri Ochoa (Independiente del Valle)
- (Uruguay) Ignacio Rodríguez (Boca Juniors)
- (Venezuela) José Sequera (Caracas)

1 goal

- (Paraguay) Ángel Aguilera (Cerro Porteño)
- (Venezuela) Bryant Albizo (Caracas)
- (Brazil) Allan (Palmeiras)
- (Peru) Sebastián Aranda (Alianza Lima)
- (Ecuador) Keny Arroyo (Independiente del Valle)
- (Uruguay) Rodrigo Cabrera (Defensor Sporting)
- (Chile) Esteban Calderón (O'Higgins)
- (Uruguay) Eduardo Correa (Peñarol)
- (Uruguay) Mathías De Ritis (Peñarol)
- (Argentina) Lautaro Di Lollo (Boca Juniors)
- (Mali) Dramané Diarra (Cerro Porteño)
- (Colombia) Rubio España (Envigado)
- (Brazil) Estêvão (Palmeiras)
- (Paraguay) Alexis Fariña (Cerro Porteño)
- (Uruguay) Joaquín Ferreira (Peñarol)
- (Argentina) Nahuel Génez (Boca Juniors)
- (Brazil) Gilberto Júnior (Palmeiras)
- (Uruguay) Santiago Homenchenko (Peñarol)
- (Uruguay) Washington Lima (Defensor Sporting)
- (Uruguay) Andrés Madruga (Peñarol)
- (Chile) Martín Maturana (O'Higgins)
- (Ecuador) Patrik Mercado (Independiente del Valle)
- (Uruguay) Pablo Nongoy (Peñarol)
- (Venezuela) Daniel Padilla (Caracas)
- (Ecuador) Kendry Páez (Independiente del Valle)
- (Bolivia) Moisés Paniagua (Always Ready)
- (Paraguay) Tobías Portillo (Cerro Porteño)
- (Venezuela) Lucciano Reinoso (Caracas)
- (Mali) Adama Noss Traoré (Cerro Porteño)
- (Uruguay) Leandro Umpiérrez (Peñarol)
