= Torneo de Reserva (Argentina) =

- Founded: 1910; 116 years ago
- First season: 1910
- Country: Argentina
- Number of clubs: 36
- International cup: U-20 Copa Libertadores
- Current champions: Racing (2026 Apertura)
- Most championships: Racing (9 titles)

The Torneo de Reserva is a youth football league in Argentina.

All First Division clubs have the option to field a team in the Reserve Tournament to give their non-starting players the chance to maintain match fitness. Typically, reserve fixtures are played a few hours before the First Division matches, although they may be rescheduled and played behind closed doors due to unforeseen circumstances.

== History ==
=== Beginnings ===
In the early days of Argentine football, club reserve teams used to compete alongside the senior sides in the championships organized by the Argentine Association Football League, the predecessor of today’s Argentine Football Association. The first reserve team to take part in the AAFL was Lomas Academy, which finished as runners-up in the First Division in its 1895 debut, placing just behind its own senior team, Lomas. The following year, it went on to become the only reserve side ever to win a First Division title. After that achievement, Lomas Academy was dissolved, but its milestone set the precedent: by 1897, Belgrano’s second team had affiliated, though it folded after playing that season. In 1899, with the creation of the Second Division, reserve teams began competing in Argentina’s second tier.

=== Early Tournaments ===
With the introduction of the promotion and relegation system in 1906, the Second Division experienced a constant and massive increase in the number of participating teams, leading the competition to be played in several sections made up of both senior and reserve sides, from the same division as well as from the First Division. By 1909, the tournament had reached 37 participants— a figure that would not be surpassed in the division until 2024. Because of this, the Argentine Football Association decided to restructure the competition, creating a tournament exclusively for the reserve teams of First Division clubs. The first Reserve Tournament was held in 1910 and won by River Plate. It was played in parallel to the Second Division, with the two champions facing each other in a final to determine a single overall champion.

Despite the restructuring, the number of teams had not decreased. Therefore, in 1911, the lower divisions underwent another reorganization with the creation of the Segunda Liga, the body responsible for organizing a new second-tier competition: the División Intermedia, which incorporated some of the teams from the Second Division. As a result, the champion of the First Division Reserve Tournament would go on to play a final against the champion of this new competition. In addition, the Reserve Tournament of the División Intermedia was also created, a parallel competition to the Second Division, which became the third tier.

Between 1912 and 1914, the Federación Argentina de Football (FAF) organized breakaway tournaments, and from 1919 to 1926, the Asociación Amateurs de Football (AAmF) held its own championships—both First Division and División Intermedia—parallel to the official competitions organized by the Asociación Argentina de Football. However, in the latter, the reserve tournament was organized irregularly and was not played at all in 1922 and 1923.

In 1927, with the creation of Primera División B, the Primera División B Reserve Tournament began to be contested.

After the 1931 split, the amateur association organized its final tournaments. In 1933, the Association implemented a restructuring different from previous ones. With the elimination of Primera División B, División Intermedia and the Second Division, their respective reserve competitions were also abolished, replaced instead by a new Second Division and its corresponding Reserve Tournament.

The last Reserve Tournament of the amateur era was held in 1934, with Colegiales winning it for the first and only time.

=== Professional Era ===
In 1931, the first professional tournament was held, with Racing winning the title. In 1934, the competition functioned as the Second Division of the LAF, and from 1935 onward it replaced the amateur Second Division. During the 1936 season, First Division reserve sides competed alongside the newly formed Second Division clubs. Beginning in 1937, with the Second Division reserved exclusively for senior teams, the competition returned to operating strictly as a Reserve Tournament. In 1938, the tournament was not completed and no champion was declared.

In 1971, the tournament ceased to be played across all divisions.

=== Return of the Tournament ===
In 1981, the tournament was reinstated, and for the first time, indirectly affiliated clubs were allowed to participate under Resolution 1309. It was played annually until 1984, although in that final year the competition was not completed.

Starting in 1985, the season began mid-year and concluded mid-year the following season, in order to align with the European transfer market and calendar. From 1986 onward, indirectly affiliated clubs gained regular access to the competition through the Nacional B. In the 1995–96 season, once again, the tournament was not completed.

Beginning in 1999, indirectly affiliated clubs started taking part in the tournament, although until 2008 it was played irregularly, resulting in none of those editions being completed and no champions being crowned. Starting with the 2008–09 season, the AFA ruled that all participating teams were required to play every match until a champion was determined, which ensured that from 2009 onward, each tournament had an official winner.

In the second half of 2014, a transitional tournament was held to return to the annual calendar. The 2016 season marked the return to the European calendar beginning with 2016–17. Due to the COVID-19 pandemic, no competition was held in the second half of 2020, and from 2021 the tournament returned to an annual schedule. The club with the most titles is Boca Juniors, having won 20.

In 2024, the AFA decided not to hold the tournament, organizing only two editions of the Copa de la Liga and the Trofeo de Campeones.

In 2025, the tournament resumed once again.

== List of Champions ==
- (In bracket, title count):

Ed.	Season	Champion	Runner-up
1	1910	River Plate (1)	Quilmes
2	1911	River Plate (2)	Porteño
3	1912 AAF	Racing (1)	River Plate
3	1912 FAF	Independiente (1)	
4	1913 AAF	Ferro Carril Oeste (1)	
4	1913 FAF	Estudiantes (LP) (1)	
5	1914 AAF	Quilmes (1)	
5	1914 FAF	Independiente (2)	
6	1915	River Plate (3)	
7	1916	River Plate (4)	
8	1917	Independiente (3)	Boca Juniors
9	1918	Boca Juniors (1)	Racing
10	1919 AAF	Boca Juniors (2)	
10	1919 AAmF	Racing (2)	
11	1920 AAF	Sportivo Barracas (1)	Boca Juniors
11	1920 AAmF	River Plate (5)	Independiente
12	1921 AAF	Sportivo Palermo (1)	
12	1921 AAmF	Independiente (4)	River Plate
13	1922 AAmF	San Lorenzo (1)	River Plate
14	1923 AAmF	Independiente (5)	Ferro Carril Oeste
15	1924 AAF	Boca Juniors (3)	
15	1924 AAmF	San Lorenzo (2)	Platense
16	1925 AAF	El Porvenir (1)	
16	1925 AAmF	Ferro Carril Oeste (2)	River Plate
17	1926 AAF	Boca Juniors (4)	
17	1926 AAmF	Vélez Sarsfield (1)	Independiente
18	1927	Vélez Sarsfield (2)	Boca Juniors
19	1928	Boca Juniors (5)	
20	1929	Gimnasia y Esgrima (LP) (1)	Boca Juniors
21	1930	Boca Juniors (6)	Independiente
22	1931 AFAP	Sportivo Buenos Aires (1)	Sportivo Barracas
22	1931 LAF	Racing (3)	Boca Juniors
23	1932 AFAP	Barracas Central (1)	
23	1932 LAF	Huracán (1)	Boca Juniors
24	1933 AFAP	Dock Sud (1)	Argentino (Q)
24	1933 LAF	Vélez Sarsfield (3)	San Lorenzo
25	1934 AAF	Colegiales (1)	Excursionistas
25	1934 LAF	River Plate (6)	San Lorenzo
26	1935	Estudiantes (LP) (2)	Independiente
27	1936	Boca Juniors (7)	San Lorenzo
28	1937	Boca Juniors (8)	River Plate
29	1938	(Not finished)	
30	1939	San Lorenzo (3)	Boca Juniors
31	1940	Boca Juniors (9)	Independiente
32	1941	River Plate (7)	Boca Juniors
33	1942	River Plate (8)	Huracán
34	1943	River Plate (9)	San Lorenzo
35	1944	San Lorenzo (4)	Estudiantes (LP)
36	1945	Independiente (6)	Racing
37	1946	Independiente (7)	River Plate
38	1947	San Lorenzo (5)	Newell's Old Boys
39	1948	San Lorenzo (6)	Independiente
40	1949	Rosario Central (1)	Racing
41	1950	River Plate (10)	Independiente
42	1951	River Plate (11)	Boca Juniors
43	1952	Racing (4)	River Plate
44	1953	San Lorenzo (7)	Estudiantes (LP)
45	1954	San Lorenzo (8)	Newell's Old Boys
46	1955	Boca Juniors (10)	River Plate
47	1956	Boca Juniors (11)	River Plate
48	1957	Racing (5)	Vélez Sarsfield
49	1958	Boca Juniors (12)	Racing
50	1959	Racing (6)	River Plate
51	1960	Racing (7)	Boca Juniors
52	1961	Independiente (8)	Atlanta
53	1962	Boca Juniors (13)	Independiente
54	1963	Racing (8)	River Plate
55	1964	Independiente (9)	Boca Juniors
56	1965	Rosario Central (2)	Boca Juniors
57	1966	Estudiantes (LP) (1)	San Lorenzo
58	1967	Boca Juniors (14)	Unión
59	1968	Boca Juniors (15)	River Plate
60	1969	Chacarita Juniors (1)	Estudiantes (LP)
61	1970	San Lorenzo (9)	Racing
–	1971–80	(No tournament)	
62	1981	Rosario Central (3)	Estudiantes (LP)
63	1982	Estudiantes (LP) (2)	Ferro Carril Oeste
64	1983	Ferro Carril Oeste (3)	Rosario Central
65	1984	(Not finished)	
66	1985–86	Newell's Old Boys (1)	Ferro Carril Oeste
67	1986–87	Newell's Old Boys (2)	Argentinos Juniors
68	1987–88	Argentinos Juniors (1)	Newell's Old Boys
69	1988–89	Newell's Old Boys (3)	Independiente
70	1989–90	Independiente (10)	Ferro Carril Oeste
71	1990–91	Ferro Carril Oeste (4)	Rosario Central
72	1991–92	Boca Juniors (16)	Estudiantes (LP)
73	1992–93	Estudiantes (LP) (3)	Boca Juniors
74	1993–94	Newell's Old Boys (4)	Lanús
75	1994–95	Vélez Sarsfield (4)	River Plate
76	1995–96	(Not finished)	
77	1996–97	San Lorenzo (10)	River Plate
78	1997–98	Lanús (1)	Newell's Old Boys
79	1998–99	San Lorenzo (11)	Estudiantes (LP)
80	1999–00	(Not finished)	
81	2000–01	(Not finished)	
82	2001–02	(Not finished)	
83	2002–03	(Not finished)	
84	2003–04	(Not finished)	
85	2004–05	(Not finished)	
86	2005–06	(Not finished)	
87	2006–07	(Not finished)	
88	2007–08	(Not finished)	
89	2008–09	Banfield (1)	Rosario Central
90	2009–10	Boca Juniors (17)	River Plate
91	2010–11	Lanús (2)	River Plate
92	2011–12	Boca Juniors (18)	Independiente
93	2012–13	Colón (1)	Argentinos Juniors
94	2013–14	Rosario Central (4)	River Plate
95	2014	River Plate (12)	Racing
96	2015	San Lorenzo (12)	Independiente
97	2016	Newell's Old Boys (5)	River Plate
98	2016–17	Talleres (C) (1)	Lanús
99	2017–18	Talleres (C) (2)	San Lorenzo
100	2018–19	San Lorenzo (13)	Boca Juniors
101	2019–20	Lanús (3)	Independiente
102	2021	Boca Juniors (19)	Colón
103	2022	Boca Juniors (20)	Vélez Sarsfield
104	2023	Vélez Sarsfield (5)	Belgrano
105	2025 Apertura	Vélez Sarsfield (6)	San Lorenzo
105	2025 Clausura	Boca Juniors (21)	Gimnasia y Esgrima (LP)
106	2026 Apertura	Racing (9)	River Plate
106	2026 Clausura	–	–
106	2026 Tabla Anual	Independiente (11)	Vélez Sarsfield

=== Titles by club ===
Rank	Club	Titles	Seasons won
1	Boca Juniors	21	1918, 1919 AAF, 1924 AAF, 1926 AAF, 1928, 1930, 1936, 1937, 1940, 1955, 1956, 1958, 1962, 1967, 1968, 1991–92, 2009–10, 2011–12, 2021, 2022, 2025 Clausura
2	San Lorenzo	13	1922 AAmF, 1924 AAmF, 1939, 1944, 1947, 1948, 1953, 1954, 1970, 1996–97, 1998–99, 2015, 2018–19
3	River Plate	12	1910, 1911, 1915, 1916, 1920 AAmF, 1934 LAF, 1941, 1942, 1943, 1950, 1951, 2014
4	Independiente	11	1912 FAF, 1914 FAF, 1917, 1921 AAmF, 1923 AAmF, 1945, 1946, 1961, 1964, 1989–90, 2026 Tabla Anual
5	Racing	9	1912 AAF, 1919 AAmF, 1931 LAF, 1952, 1957, 1959, 1960, 1963, 2026 Apertura
6	Vélez Sarsfield	6	1926 AAmF, 1927, 1933 LAF, 1994–95, 2023, 2025 Apertura
7	Estudiantes (LP)	5	1913 FAF, 1935, 1966, 1982, 1992–93
7	Newell's Old Boys	5	1985–86, 1986–87, 1988–89, 1993–94, 2016
8	Ferro Carril Oeste	4	1913 AAF, 1925 AAmF, 1983, 1990–91
8	Rosario Central	4	1949, 1965, 1981, 2013–14
9	Lanús	3	1997–98, 2010–11, 2019–20
10	Talleres (C)	2	2016–17, 2017–18
11	Argentinos Juniors	1	1987–88
11	Banfield	1	2008–09
11	Barracas Central	1	1932 AFAP
11	Chacarita Juniors	1	1969
11	Colegiales	1	1934 AAF
11	Colón	1	2012–13
11	Dock Sud	1	1933 AFAP
11	El Porvenir	1	1925 AAF
11	Gimnasia y Esgrima (LP)	1	1929
11	Huracán	1	1932 LAF
11	Quilmes	1	1914 AAF
11	Sportivo Barracas	1	1920 AAF
11	Sportivo Buenos Aires	1	1931 AFAP
11	Sportivo Palermo	1	1921 AAF

== National cups ==
=== Copa de Competencia ===
- (In bracket, title count):

Ed.	Season	Champion
1	1924 AAmF	River Plate (1)
2	1925 AAmF	Platense (1)
3	1926 AAmF	Vélez Sarsfield (1)
4	1932 LAF	Independiente (1)
5	1933 AFAP	Dock Sud (1)
6	1934	Boca Juniors (1)

=== Copa Estímulo ===
- (In bracket, title count):

Ed.	Season	Champion
1	1926	Boca Juniors (1)

=== Copa Béccar Varela ===
- (In bracket, title count):

Ed.	Season	Champion
1	1932 LAF	Estudiantes (LP) (1)

=== Copa de la Superliga ===
- (In bracket, title count):

Ed.	Season	Champion	Score	Runner-up
1	2019	San Lorenzo (1)	4–2	Estudiantes (LP)
–	2020	(Canceled)		

=== Copa de la Liga Profesional ===
- (In bracket, title count):

Ed.	Season	Champion	Score	Runner-up
1	2021	Sarmiento (J) (1)	2–1	Boca Juniors
2	2022	Lanús (1)	1–0	Estudiantes (LP)
3	2023	Independiente (1)	2–1	Tigre
4	2024 Inicial	Vélez Sarsfield (1)	0–0 (5–4 (p))	Lanús
4	2024 Final	River Plate (1)	2–1	San Lorenzo

=== Trofeo de Campeones ===
- (In bracket, title count):

Ed.	Season	Champion	Score	Runner-up
1	2021	Boca Juniors (1)	3–0	Sarmiento (J)
2	2022	Boca Juniors (2)	2–0	Lanús
3	2023	Vélez Sarsfield (1)	1–0	Independiente
4	2024	River Plate (1)	1–1 (4–3 (p))	Vélez Sarsfield
5	2025	Boca Juniors (3)	2–0	Vélez Sarsfield
