= Ronald Perlaza =

Ecuadorian footballer (born 2005)

Personal information
- Full name: Ronald Elkin Perlaza Bravo
- Date of birth: 11 May 2005 (age 21)
- Place of birth: Guayaquil, Ecuador
- Height: 1.75 m (5 ft 9 in)
- Position: Winger

Team information
- Current team: Aucas

Youth career
- 2020–: Aucas
- 2024–2025: → Santos (loan)

Senior career*
Years	Team	Apps	(Gls)
2023–	Aucas	10	(1)

International career
2024–	Ecuador U23	2	(0)
- * Club domestic league appearances and goals as of 22:53, 18 July 2024 (UTC)

Ronald Elkin Perlaza Bravo (born 11 May 2005) is an Ecuadorian professional footballer who plays for Brazilian club Santos, on loan from Aucas, and the Ecuador national under-23 team. Mainly a left winger, he can also play as a left-back.

== Club career ==
=== Aucas ===
Born in Guayaquil, Perlaza joined Aucas' youth setup in 2020, aged 15. He made his first team – and Ecuadorian Serie A – debut on 28 May 2023, starting and being sent off in a 2–0 home loss to Deportivo Cuenca.

Perlaza scored his first senior goal on 29 October 2023, netting his team's fourth in a 4–0 home routing of Mushuc Runa. He was the top scorer of the under-20 team in the 2024 U-20 Copa Libertadores with three goals, as the club finished fourth.

==== Loan to Santos ====
On 16 July 2024, Perlaza agreed to a one-year loan deal with Brazilian club Santos, being initially assigned to the under-20 squad. He left on 4 July 2025, after the club opted not to activate his buyout clause.

== International career ==
On 3 January 2024, Perlaza was called up to the Ecuador national under-23 team for the 2024 CONMEBOL Pre-Olympic Tournament. He featured in two matches as Ecuador was knocked out in the first stage.

== Career statistics ==
As of 18 July 2024

Club	Season	League			Cup		Continental		Total	
Club	Season	Division	Apps	Goals	Apps	Goals	Apps	Goals	Apps	Goals
Aucas	2023	Ecuadorian Serie A	10	1	—		0	0	10	1
Career total			10	1	0	0	0	0	10	1
