= Esteban Calderón =

Chilean footballer

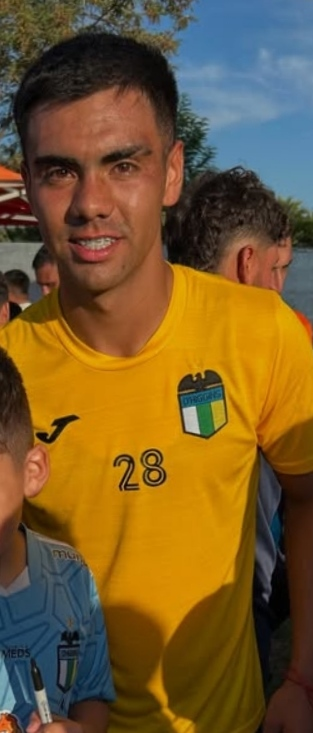
- Calderón with O'Higgins in 2025

Personal information
- Full name: Esteban Alex Calderón González
- Date of birth: 13 February 2004 (age 22)
- Place of birth: Placilla, Chile
- Height: 1.84 m (6 ft 0 in)
- Position: Striker

Team information
- Current team: Ñublense (on loan from O'Higgins)

Youth career
- Arrima de Manantiales
- Escuela Los Pingüinitos
- O'Higgins

Senior career*
Years	Team	Apps	(Gls)
2024–	O'Higgins	42	(7)
2026–	→ Ñublense (loan)	0	(0)

International career
2022	Chile U20	8	(0)
- * Club domestic league appearances and goals as of 26 July 2026

Esteban Alex Calderón González (born 13 February 2004) is a Chilean footballer who plays as a striker for Chilean Primera División side Ñublense on loan from O'Higgins.

== Club career ==
Born in Rinconada de Manantiales, Placilla commune, Chile, Calderón was with club Arrima from his hometown and Escuela de Fútbol (Football Academy) Los Pingüinitos from Nancagua before joining the O'Higgins youth ranks. With the under-20's, he took part in the 2023 U20 Copa Libertadores. He made his senior debut in the 1–3 away win against Deportes Copiapó for the Chilean Primera División on 17 February 2024 and scored his first goal two weeks later against Everton de Viña del Mar on 2 March. He signed his first professional contract on 28 February of the same year. In September 2024, he was selected by the CIES Football Observatory as the fifth best South American U21 striker.

A regular player during 2024 and 2025, Calderón suffered a serious meniscus tear on 27 August 2025.

In July 2026, Calderón was loaned out to Ñublense.

== International career ==
In September 2022, Calderón represented the Chile under-20 national team at the Costa Cálida Supercup in San Pedro del Pinatar, Spain. The next month, he represented them at the 2022 South American Games.
