= Rubio César España =

Colombian footballer (born 2004)

Personal information
- Full name: Rubio César España Álvarez
- Date of birth: 11 January 2004 (age 22)
- Place of birth: Mompox, Bolívar, Colombia
- Height: 1.78 m (5 ft 10 in)
- Position: Winger

Team information
- Current team: Envigado
- Number: 8

Youth career
- Cifuentes

Senior career*
Years	Team	Apps	(Gls)
2022–	Envigado	73	(5)
2024–2025	→ Santos Laguna (loan)	0	(0)
- * Club domestic league appearances and goals as of 12 December 2025

Rubio César España Álvarez (born 11 January 2004) is a Colombian footballer who currently plays as a winger for Envigado.

== Club career ==
Born in Santa Cruz de Mompox in the Bolívar Department of Colombia, España began his career with footballing school Cifuentes FC in the Tolima Department. At the Under 17 National Tournament in Barranquilla, he represented the Tolima Department, scoring a hat-trick against the representative team from the Guainía Department. He led his team to the title, as Tolima defeated their counterparts, Antioquia Department, 2–1 in the final.

These performances caught the eye of professional side Envigado, who signed España mid-way through the 2022 season. Having made his debut in a 1–0 away loss to Once Caldas on 20 September, he scored his first goal for the club the following month, on 29 October. Having been named in the starting line-up for the Categoría Primera A fixture against Deportes Tolima, España levelled the score-line after 33 minutes, following an early Deportes Tolima goal; receiving the ball on the edge of the area from teammate Diego Moreno, he cut back onto his left foot before drilling the ball past Deportes Tolima goalkeeper William Cuesta.

The following season, he established himself in the Envigado first team, scoring two goals in the first half of the season, against Independiente Santa Fe and again against Deportes Tolima. His performances in the U-20 Copa Libertadores, including his side's only goal of the competition - in a 1–0 win against Bolivian opposition Always Ready - drew the attention of national media, who hailed España as a promising jewel of Colombian football.

== Style of play ==
A right-footed winger, España will often play on the left side of attack, using his speed to beat opposition defenders.

== Career statistics ==
=== Club ===
As of 13 July 2023.

Appearances and goals by club, season and competition
Club	Season	League			Cup		Continental		Other		Total	
Club	Season	Division	Apps	Goals	Apps	Goals	Apps	Goals	Apps	Goals	Apps	Goals
Envigado	2022	Categoría Primera A	6	1	0	0	–		0	0	6	1
Envigado	2023	Categoría Primera A	18	2	2 (Note: Appearances in the Copa Colombia)	0	–		0	0	20	2
Career total			24	3	2	0	0	0	0	0	26	3
