= Martín Maturana =

Chilean footballer (born 2004)

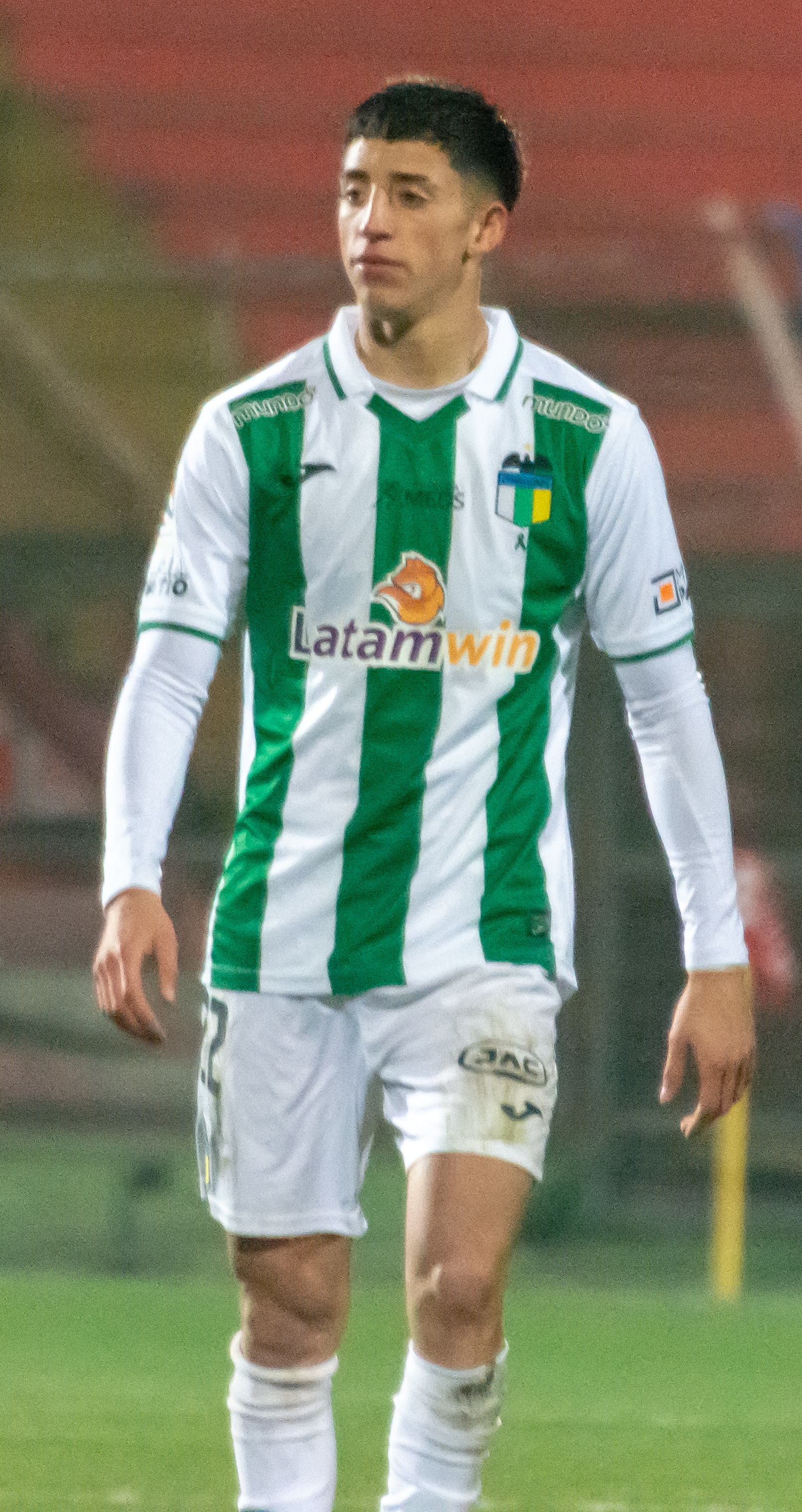
- Maturana with O'Higgins in 2023

Personal information
- Full name: Martín Ignacio Maturana Romero
- Date of birth: 18 January 2004 (age 22)
- Place of birth: Rancagua, Chile
- Height: 1.77 m (5 ft 10 in)
- Position: Midfielder

Team information
- Current team: O'Higgins

Youth career
- 2012–2023: O'Higgins

Senior career*
Years	Team	Apps	(Gls)
2023–	O'Higgins	20	(1)
2025	→ Deportes Santa Cruz (loan)	21	(1)

International career
2022–2024	Chile U20	4	(0)
- * Club domestic league appearances and goals as of 1 February 2026

Martín Ignacio Maturana Romero (born 18 January 2004) is a Chilean footballer who plays as a midfielder and currently plays for O'Higgins of the Primera División de Chile.

== Club career ==
Maturana was called up to the O'Higgins first team for the 2023 season and played 8 matches of league and 2023 Copa Chile three matches in the campaign being eliminated at quarter-finals against Magallanes. In 2025, he was loaned out to Deportes Santa Cruz.

== International career ==
At early age, he represented Chile at under-20 level at the 2023 South American U-20 Championship playing four matches, being eliminated in the round robin.
