= Kevin Altez =

Uruguayan footballer (born 2004)

Personal information
- Full name: Kevin Nahuel Altez Moyano
- Date of birth: 15 December 2004 (age 21)
- Place of birth: Montevideo, Uruguay
- Height: 1.69 m (5 ft 7 in)
- Position: Attacking midfielder

Team information
- Current team: Huachipato (on loan from Defensor Sporting)
- Number: 40

Youth career
- Málaga (five-a-side)
- 2018–2020: Bella Vista
- 2021–2022: Montevideo City Torque

Senior career*
Years	Team	Apps	(Gls)
2022–2024	Montevideo City Torque	40	(5)
2025–	Defensor Sporting	7	(0)
2025–	→ Huachipato (loan)	16	(1)

International career
2022	Uruguay U18	3	(0)
2022	Uruguay U20	1	(0)
- * Club domestic league appearances and goals as of 11 December 2025

Kevin Nahuel Altez Moyano (born 15 December 2004) is a Uruguayan professional footballer who plays as an attacking midfielder for Chilean Primera División club Huachipato on loan from Defensor Sporting.

== Club career ==
As a youth player, Altez played baby fútbol with Club Social y Deportivo Málaga in Punta de Rieles neighbourhood, Montevideo, before spending two and a half year with Bella Vista. He joined Montevideo City Torque at the age of 16 and made his professional debut in the 2022 season of the Uruguayan Primera División under Sebastián Eguren and scored his first goal in the 1–1 draw against Boston River on 22 April 2023.

In January 2025, Altez switched to Defensor Sporting on a two-year deal. In the second half of the same year, he moved abroad and joined on loan to Chilean Primera División club Huachipato.

== International career ==
In August 2022, Altez represented Uruguay at under-18 level at the SBS Cup in Japan. In September of the same year, he represented the under-20's at the Copa Intendencia de Maldonado in Maldonado, Uruguay. In addition, he was in the preliminary squad for the 2023 South American U20 Championship and served as a sparring player for the Uruguay senior team under Diego Alonso.

== Honours ==
Huachipato

- Copa Chile: 2025
