= Matías Pinto =

Chilean footballer

Personal information
- Full name: Matías D'Alessandro Pinto Álvarez
- Date of birth: 11 September 2004 (age 22)
- Place of birth: Santiago, Chile
- Height: 1.75 m (5 ft 9 in)
- Position: Right-back

Team information
- Current team: Deportes La Serena (on loan from Colo-Colo)
- Number: 29

Youth career
- Colo-Colo

Senior career*
Years	Team	Apps	(Gls)
2021–	Colo-Colo	1	(0)
2025–	→ Deportes La Serena (loan)	19	(0)

International career^{‡}
2019	Chile U16	3	(0)
- * Club domestic league appearances and goals as of 21 April 2026 ‡ National team caps and goals as of 21 April 2026

Matías D'Alessandro Pinto Álvarez (born 11 September 2004) is a Chilean footballer who plays as a right-back for Deportes La Serena on loan from Colo-Colo.

== Club career ==
A product of Colo-Colo, Pinto made his professional debut under Gustavo Quinteros in the 2–0 away loss against Audax Italiano for the Chilean Primera División on 28 October 2021 in the context of the COVID-19 pandemic.

A member of the Colo-Colo first team during 2023 and 2024, Pinto was loaned out to Deportes La Serena in the Chilean top division in January 2025. He renewed with them for the 2026 season.

== International career ==
Pinto represented Chile in the 2019 UEFA Under-16 Development Tournament facing Finland, Switzerland and South Korea. The next year, he took part in trainings with the under 17's.
