= Mauricio Benítez =

Argentine footballer (born 2004)

Personal information
- Full name: Mauricio Leonel Benítez
- Date of birth: 3 February 2004 (age 22)
- Place of birth: Florencio Varela, Argentina
- Height: 1.85 m (6 ft 1 in)
- Position: Defensive midfielder

Team information
- Current team: Antwerp
- Number: 8

Youth career
- 2010–2024: Boca Juniors

Senior career*
Years	Team	Apps	(Gls)
2024–2026	Boca Juniors	5	(0)
2025–2026	→ Antwerp (loan)	37	(3)
2026–	Antwerp		(0)
- * Club domestic league appearances and goals as of 20 September 2026

Mauricio Leonel Benítez (born 3 February 2004) is an Argentine professional football player who plays as a defensive midfielder for Belgian Pro League club Antwerp.

== Career ==
Benítez joined the youth academy of Boca Juniors in 2010. On 3 February 2022, he signed his first professional contract with the club until 2026. He helped their U20s win the 2023 U-20 Copa Libertadores and 2023 Under-20 Intercontinental Cup. On 1 February 2024, he debuted with the senior Boca Juniors team in a 1–1 Copa de la Liga Profesional tie with Sarmiento. He played 5 more matches in the Copa de la Liga Profesional that season, before being sidelined with an abductor tear on 13 April 2024 to end the season. On 18 April 2024, he extended his contract with Boca Juniors until December 2028.

On 3 February 2025, Benítez joined the Belgian Pro League club Antwerp until June 2026, with an option to sign permanently.

On 20 August 2026, Benítez returned to Antwerp on a permanent basis and signed a four-season contract.
