= Mathías De Ritis =

Uruguayan footballer (born 2003)

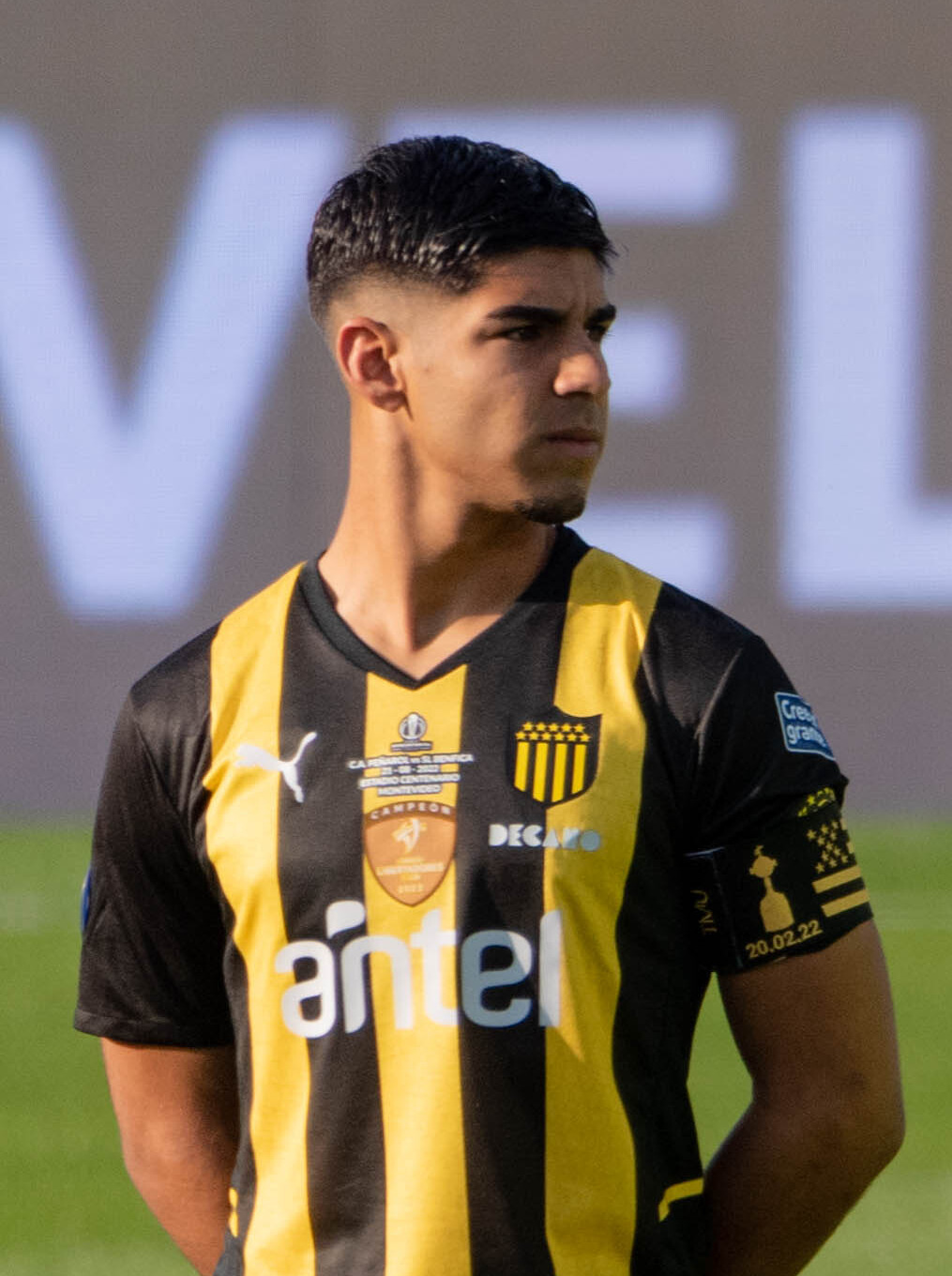
- De Ritis in 2022

Personal information
- Full name: Mathías Agustín De Ritis Serrentino
- Date of birth: 31 January 2003 (age 23)
- Place of birth: Montevideo, Uruguay
- Height: 1.80 m (5 ft 11 in)
- Position: Left-back

Team information
- Current team: San Lorenzo
- Number: 6

Youth career
- Club Social y Deportivo Rocha
- Peñarol

Senior career*
Years	Team	Apps	(Gls)
2023–2026	Peñarol	0	(0)
2024–2025	→ Banfield (loan)	28	(1)
2026–	San Lorenzo	23	(0)

International career
2021–2023	Uruguay U20	39	(0)
Medal record
Men's football
Representing Uruguay
FIFA U-20 World Cup
Winner	2023 Argentina
South American U-20 Championship
Runner-up	2023 Colombia
- * Club domestic league appearances and goals as of 17:53, 21 November 2026 (UTC)

Mathías Agustín De Ritis Serrentino (born 31 January 2003) is a Uruguayan professional footballer who plays as a left-back for San Lorenzo.

== Honours ==
Uruguay U20

- FIFA U-20 World Cup: 2023
- South American U-20 Championship runner-up: 2023
