= Alexis Fariña =

Paraguayan professional footballer (born 2004)

Personal information
- Full name: Alexis Adrián Fariña Romero
- Date of birth: 17 December 2004 (age 21)
- Place of birth: Paraguay
- Height: 1.70 m (5 ft 7 in)
- Positions: Attacking midfielder; wide midfielder

Team information
- Current team: 2 de Mayo (on loan from Cerro Porteño)
- Number: 30

Youth career
- 2019: Deportivo Capiatá
- 2020–2022: Cerro Porteño

Senior career*
Years	Team	Apps	(Gls)
2022–	Cerro Porteño	41	(2)
2025	→ Minnesota United 2 (loan)	3	(1)
2026–	→ 2 de Mayo (loan)	2	(0)
- * Club domestic league appearances and goals as of 11 March 2026

Alexis Adrián Fariña Romero (born 17 December 2004) is a Paraguayan professional footballer who plays as an attacking midfielder or wide midfielder for Paraguayan Primera División club 2 de Mayo, on loan from Club Cerro Porteño in the Paraguayan Primera División.

== Career ==
Alexis Fariña began his football development at Club Deportivo Capiatá, playing in the U-16 category in 2019. He later joined the youth system of Club Cerro Porteño, where he progressed through the U-18 and U-20 levels.

In 2023, after impressing in the U-20 team, Fariña was promoted to Cerro Porteño's senior squad. His professional debut in the Paraguayan Primera División took place on March 13, 2023, in a match against Sportivo Luqueño, where he came on as a substitute and made an impact with his performance. During the game, he executed a remarkable backheel assist that contributed to his team's 3–2 victory.

Fariña has continued to earn playing time with Cerro Porteño's first team, solidifying himself as a promising talent for the club.

On 22 August 2025, Fariña joined Major League Soccer side Minnesota United on a one-year loan.

== Career statistics ==
=== Club ===
Season	Country	Club	League	Matches	Goals	Assists
2025	Paraguay	Club Cerro Porteño	Paraguayan Primera División	2	0	1
2024	Paraguay	Club Cerro Porteño	Paraguayan Primera División	19	2	1
2023	Paraguay	Club Cerro Porteño	Paraguayan Primera División	7	0	-
2023	Paraguay	Club Cerro Porteño	U-20	5	1	-
2022	Paraguay	Club Cerro Porteño	U-20	-	-	-
2021	Paraguay	Club Cerro Porteño	Juniors U-18	-	-	-
2019	Paraguay	Club Deportivo Capiatá	Juveniles U-16	-	-	-
