= Freddy Noguera =

Paraguayan footballer (born 2004)

Personal information
- Full name: Freddy Ariel Noguera Rolon
- Date of birth: 9 January 2004 (age 22)
- Place of birth: Eusebio Ayala, Cordillera, Paraguay
- Height: 1.85 m (6 ft 1 in)
- Positions: Forward; winger

Team information
- Current team: Cerro Porteño

Youth career
- Cerro Porteño
- Olimpia
- 2022–2024: Grêmio
- 2024: → Olimpia (loan)

Senior career*
Years	Team	Apps	(Gls)
2023–	Grêmio	1	(0)
2024	→ Olimpia (loan)	2	(0)
2024–	→ Boston River (loan)	0	(0)

International career
2022	Paraguay U20	3	(0)
- * Club domestic league appearances and goals as of 29 September 2024

Freddy Ariel Noguera Rolón born 9 January 2004 in Eusebio Ayala) is a Paraguayan footballer who plays as a forward for Paraguayan club Cerro Porteño, on loan from the Brazilian side Grêmio.

== Club career ==
Born in Eusebio Ayala in the Cordillera Department of Paraguay, Noguera began his career with Cerro Porteño before a move to Olimpia. In a later interview, Noguera's father stated that during the COVID-19 pandemic in Paraguay, Olimpia failed to communicate with players, and because of this, he began exploring the possibility of joining a new club.

In March 2022, he joined Grêmio, signing a four-year contract with a $30 million release clause. Following his departure, former Olimpia youth coach Enrique Landaida stated that the club did all they could to keep Noguera at the club. He scored on his debut for Grêmio's under-20 team; the only goal in their 1–0 win against Apafut. In July 2023, he was included in the first-team squad ahead of a Série A match against Atlético Mineiro. He made his professional debut in the 1–0 win on 22 July, coming on as a second-half substitute for André Henrique.

== International career ==
Noguera has represented Paraguay at under-20 level.

== Personal life ==
Noguera is the cousin of Ronaldo Martínez, a fellow footballer who also played for Cerro Porteño.

== Career statistics ==
=== Club ===
As of 4 September 2023.

Appearances and goals by club, season and competition
Club	Season	League			State League		Cup		Continental		Other		Total	
Club	Season	Division	Apps	Goals	Apps	Goals	Apps	Goals	Apps	Goals	Apps	Goals	Apps	Goals
Grêmio	2023	Série A	1	0	0	0	0	0	0	0	0	0	1	0
Career total			1	0	0	0	0	0	0	0	0	0	1	0
