= Boca Juniors Reserves and Academy =

Football club

Boca Juniors
- Full name: Club Atlético Boca Juniors
- Nicknames: Xeneizes (Genoese), Azul y Oro (Blue and Gold), La Mitad Más Uno (Half plus One)
- Founded: 1910; 116 years ago (Reserve teams)
- Ground: Centro de Entrenamiento Boca Juniors, Ezeiza
- Capacity: 1,000
- Chairman: Jorge Amor Ameal
- Manager: Silvio Rudman
Home colours	Away colours

Boca Juniors Reserves and Academy are the reserve and youth academy teams of Boca Juniors. Boca Juniors reserve team plays in the "Primera División de Reserva", the reserve division of Primera División. Home matches are played at the "Boca Juniors Training Center", inaugurated in 2017 and sited in Ezeiza, Buenos Aires. The Boca Juniors reserves are the team with the most Torneo de Reserva championships with 20 titles, since the squad was established in 1910.

Some of the most notable players from the youth divisions include Américo Tesoriere, Pedro Calomino, Alfredo Garasini, Ernesto Lazzatti, Natalio Pescia, Mario Boyé, Antonio Rattín, Ángel Clemente Rojas (regarded by many supporters as the greatest idol in club's history), Alberto Tarantini, Roberto Mouzo, Oscar Ruggeri, Diego Latorre, Fernando Gago, Carlos Tevez, and Leandro Paredes. On the other side, Sebastián Battaglia is the most winning player in club's history with 19 titles won (17 as player and 2 as manager).

According to the International Centre for Sports Studies, Boca Juniors is the club which trained the largest number of professional players worldwide, having trained 78 footballers. The statistic took 285 clubs from 15 different leagues.

== The Academy ==
Known as "The Boca Factory", Boca Juniors youth divisions contains teams from under-8 to under-20 level. They participate in Argentina's youth leagues organized by the Argentine Football Association. In 1996 Mauricio Macri (who had been elected president of the club one year later) stated that rather than buy players for huge money only to put too much expectation on them and watch them under-perform, they wanted to create their own stars. Therefore, Boca hired two very influential figures; one was Bernardo Griffa, a leading expert of youth in Argentina who had created a successful scouting network at Newell's Old Boys. The second was Ramón Maddoni, the king of 'baby football' (indoor six-a-side football for 5–12 year olds), who had a long career at Club Parque at the moment of being hired by Boca Juniors.

Since then, Boca's academy has brought through, and also sold, more than 350 homegrown players from all age categories. From the list of the 350 players, more than 130 of the academy graduates would play around the world, including in Argentina, Spain, Italy, England and many others in places ranging from Germany and the Netherlands to China and Israel. More than 35 leagues contain players that were raised and developed by the Boca academy system. The players are taught the same formation (4–3–1–2) from early on to the first-team. This makes fitting into the first-team far easier for a young player. Boca's under-20 team were regular participants in the Under-20 Copa Libertadores and other international youth football tournaments.

Boca Juniors won their first U-20 Copa Libertadores in 2023 after defeating Ecuadorian team Independiente del Valle 2–0 in the final at Estadio La Portada.

=== Scouting ===
The scouting system is comprehensive. There is a Boca Juniors scout in every small town and close to every village. Nearly all are ordinary people, such as teachers, butchers or policemen, and the head of the youth system, Jorge Griffa, regularly travel around Argentina when he took over and listened to the watching crowd, hiring the most appropriate as a scout for the area.

== Players ==
=== Current squad ===
As of 22 July 2026

Note: Flags indicate national team as defined under FIFA eligibility rules; some limited exceptions apply. Players may hold more than one non-FIFA nationality.

No.	Pos.	Nation	Player
—	GK	ARG	Thiago Perruisset
—	GK	ARG	Fernando Rodríguez
—	DF	ARG	Matías Baroni
—	DF	ARG	Baltazar Blum
—	DF	ARG	Julio Coria
—	DF	ARG	Facundo Herrera
—	DF	PAR	Gadiel Paoli
—	DF	ARG	Ignacio Rojas
—	DF	ARG	Cristiano Vidal
—	DF	ARG	Santiago Zampieri
—	MF	ARG	Gonzalo Alderete
—	MF	ARG	Lautaro Bianco

No.	Pos.	Nation	Player
—	MF	ARG	Dante González
—	MF	ARG	Tomás Márquez
—	MF	ARG	Lautaro Mendieta
—	MF	ARG	León Peludero Astrada
—	MF	ARG	Joaquín Ruiz
—	MF	ARG	Santiago Valleca
—	FW	ARG	Rodrigo Bacidalupe
—	FW	ARG	Kevin Román Ferreira
—	FW	ARG	Luciano Gómez Mansilla
—	FW	ARG	Joaquín Piñeyro
—	FW	ARG	Juan Pussetto

== FIFA World Cup champions ==
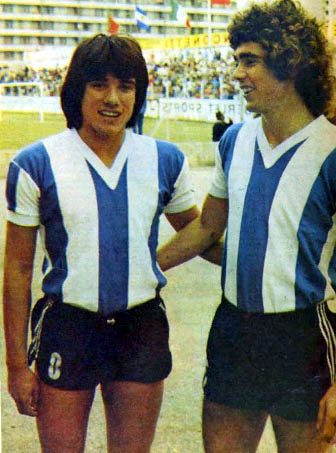
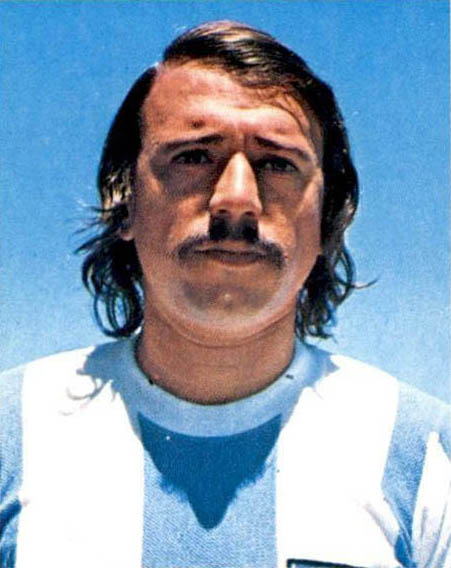
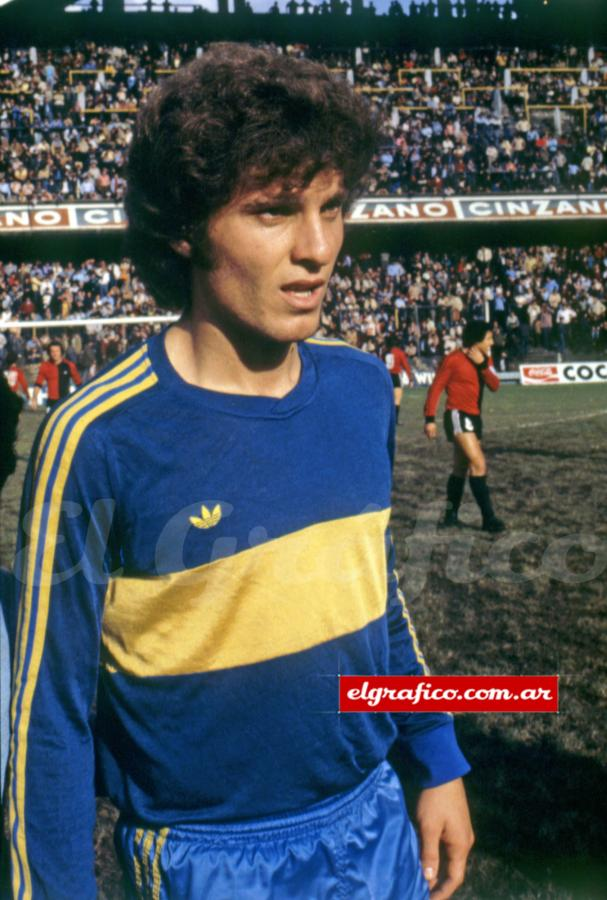
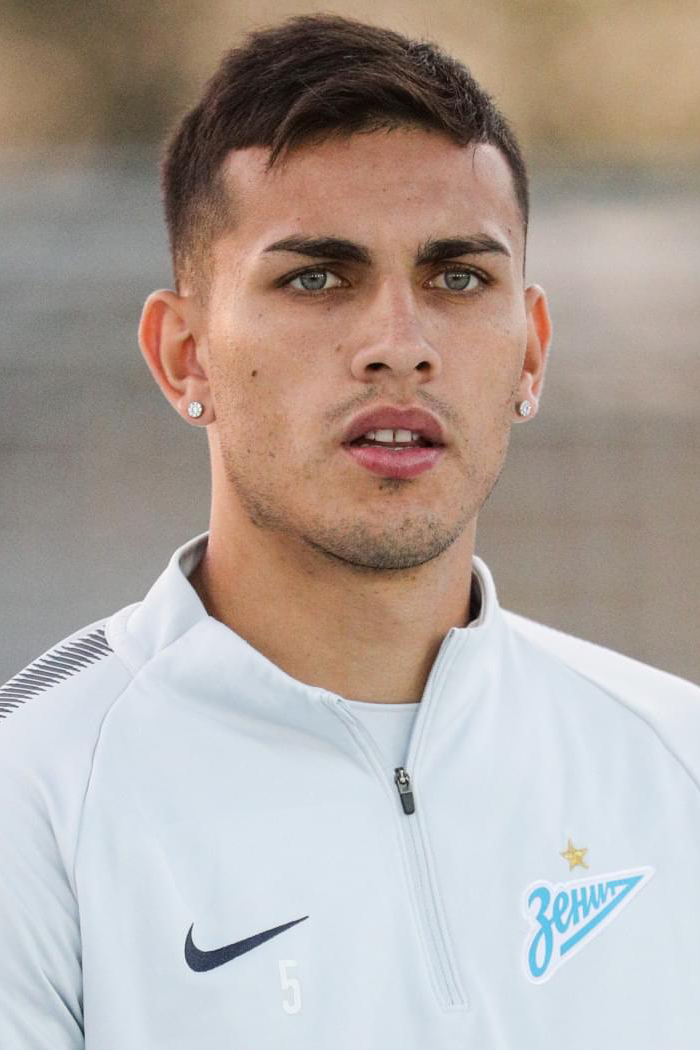
Fltr: Marcelo Trobbiani, Alberto Tarantini, Omar Larrosa, Oscar Ruggeri, and Leandro Paredes, Boca Juniors' players that were World Cup winners with Argentina

Player	Debut	WC won
Alberto Tarantini	1973	1978
Omar Larrosa	1967	1978
Marcelo Trobbiani	1973	1986
Oscar Ruggeri	1980	1986
Leandro Paredes	2010	2022
Nahuel Molina	2016	2022

== Notable graduates ==
Note: Player's career in Boca Juniors' senior squad is indicated in brackets:

- (Argentina) Américo Tesoriere (1917–20, 1922–27)
- (Argentina) Ernesto Lazzatti (1934–47)
- (Argentina) Natalio Pescia (1942–56)
- (Argentina) Antonio Rattín (1956–70)
- (Argentina) Ángel Clemente Rojas (1963–71)
- (Argentina) Roberto Mouzo (1971–84)
- (Argentina) Enzo Ferrero (1971–75)
- (Argentina) Hugo Perotti (1977–84)
- (Argentina) Alberto Tarantini (1973–77)
- (Argentina) Osvaldo Potente (1971–75, 1978–80)
- (Argentina) Oscar Ruggeri (1980–85)
- (Argentina) Diego Soñora (1988–95)
- (Argentina) Diego Latorre (1987–92, 1996–98)
- (Argentina) Luis Medero (1992–96)
- (Argentina) Sebastián Battaglia (1998–2003, 2005–13)
- (Argentina) Nicolás Burdisso (1999–2004)
- (Argentina) Clemente Rodríguez (2000–04, 2007, 2010–2013)
- (Argentina) Cristian Chávez (2005–13)
- (Argentina) Javier García (2008–12, 2020–)
- (Argentina) Ricardo Noir (2008–13)
- (Argentina) Juan Forlín (2006–09)
- (Argentina) Josué Ayala (2008–13)
- (Haiti) Sony Nordé (none) (Note: Nordé spent four years (2008–11) with the reserve team but did not play in the senior squad.)
- (Argentina) Nicolás Colazo (2008–19)
- (Paraguay) Jonathan Fabbro (2002–03)
- (Argentina) Carlos Tevez (2001–04, 2015–16, 2018–21)
- (Argentina) Fernando Gago (2004–06, 2013–19)
- (Argentina) Éver Banega (2007)
- (Argentina) Nicolás Gaitán (2008–10)
- (Argentina) Facundo Roncaglia (2007–12)
- (Argentina) Lucas Viatri (2007–14)
- (Argentina) Neri Cardozo (2004–09)
- (Argentina) Emiliano Insúa (2007)
- (Argentina) Fabián Monzón
- (Argentina) Pablo Mouche (2005–12)
- (Argentina) Nicolás Colazo (2007)
- (Argentina) Nicolás Blandi (2010–13)
- (Argentina) Juan Sánchez Miño (2010–14)
- (Argentina) Emanuel Insúa (2012–15)
- (Argentina) Luciano Acosta (2014–16)
- (Paraguay) Adrián Cubas (2014–18)
- (Uruguay) Rodrigo Bentancur (2015–17)
- (Argentina) Agustín Almendra (2018–2023)
- (Argentina) Leonardo Balerdi (2018–19)
- (Argentina) Nicolás Capaldo (2019–21)
- (Argentina) Marcelo Weigandt (2018–24)
- (Argentina) Alan Varela (2020–2023)
- (Argentina) Exequiel Zeballos (2020–)
- (Argentina) Cristian Medina (2020–25)
- (Argentina) Valentín Barco (2013–23)

== Notable managers ==
- (Argentina) Bernardo Gandulla (1947–1978)
- (Argentina) Ernesto Grillo (1966–?)
- (Argentina) Jorge Griffa (1995–2003)
- (Argentina) Norberto Madurga

Other former club players that have coached the reserve teams include Rolando Schiavi, Sebastián Battaglia, Hugo Ibarra, and Mauricio Serna.

== Facilities ==
=== Boca Juniors Training Center ===
Boca Juniors reserves' main venue is the "Boca Juniors Training Center" (popularly known as "Boca Predio"), a sports complex in the city of Ezeiza, Buenos Aires that was inaugurated in 2017 under the presidency of Daniel Angelici. The complex was built on a land conceded by the Municipality of Ezeiza for sports activities exclusively and with an expiration time of 30 years (that may be renewed for a further 10 years). The club spent AR$60 million on works.

The 60 hectares complex has 12 football fields, locker rooms, gymnasium, kitchen, and other facilities.

=== Pedro Pompilio Complex ===
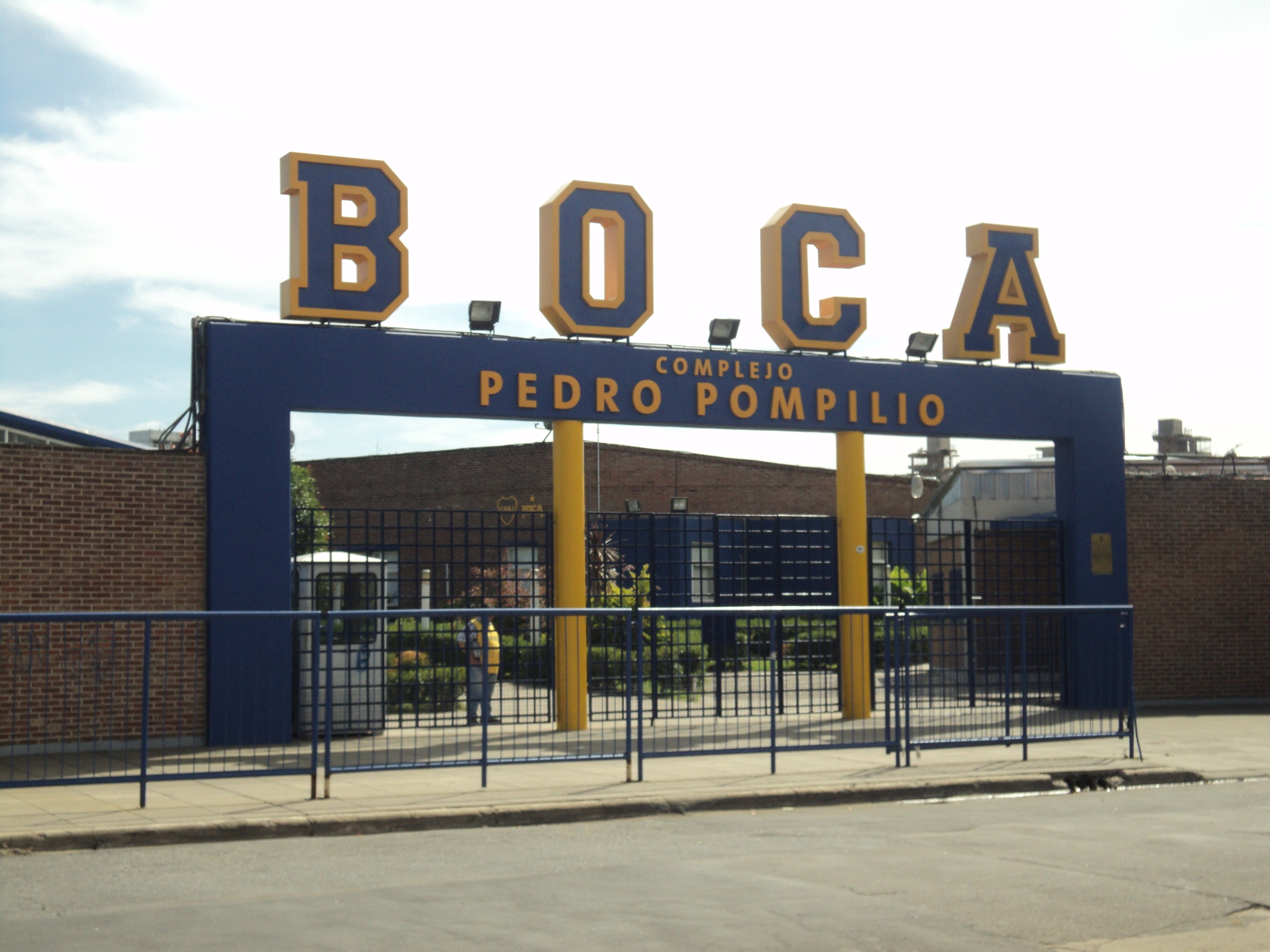
Pedro Pompilio complex, second venue of Boca Juniors reserve teams

Named after former vicepresident of the club, the complex is the second venue of Boca Juniors academies. It is located on Casa Amarilla lands in La Boca. The venue is also used by the women's football and basketball teams.

=== La Candela ===
The historic complex for the Boca Juniors academy, La Candela was acquired by the club in 1963 for mn$13 million, being operative until 1991. The 4 hectares complex located in San Justo, Buenos Aires, had been acquired during the presidency of Alberto J. Armando. The first squad of the club also trained at La Candela, which entered into disuse under the presidency of Mauricio Macri, when the reserves teams moved their training sessions to Parque Presidente Sarmiento in Saavedra, Buenos Aires. The complex was finally sold in 2005 to the "Centro de Entrenamiento para Futbolistas de Alto Rendimiento" (CEFAR) for US$350,000. Nevertheless, Boca Juniors reacquired the complex at a cost of US$12 million in 2011.

Boca Juniors used the complex until December 2016, when the club moved all the reserves' infrastructure to the new Boca Predio in Ezeiza.

== Honours ==
=== Titles ===
Type	Competition	Titles	Winning years
National (League)	Torneo de Reserva de Primera División	21	1918, 1919, 1924, 1926, 1928, 1930, 1937, 1940, 1955, 1956, 1958, 1962, 1967, 1968, 1991–92, 1997–98, 2009–10, 2011–12, 2021, 2022, 2025 Clausura
National (League)	División Intermedia	2	1922, 1923
National (League)	Segunda División (Note: Reserves and Second level teams were merged.)	1	1936
National (League)	Segunda División (fourth level)	1	1929
National (League)	Tercera División (fourth level)	3	1912, 1915, 1923
National (Cups)	Trofeo de Campeones de Reserva	3	2021, 2022, 2025
National (Cups)	Copa Bullrich	2	1918, 1934
International	FIFA Youth Cup	3	2002, 2010, 2019
International	U-20 Copa Libertadores	1	2023
International	Under-20 Intercontinental Cup	1	2023

=== Other titles ===
Friendly

- Copa Chivas (1): 2006
- Weifang Cup (2): 2018, 2019
- Torneo Internazionale Under-19 Bellinzona (4): 2000, 2001, 2011, 2012
- U-17 Copa Evo Morales (1): 2022
- Tokyo U-14 International Youth Football Tournament (4): 2013, 2014, 2016, 2017
