= Ignacio Rodríguez (footballer, born 2004) =

Spanish footballer (born 2004)

Ignacio Bautista Rodríguez (born 10 November 2004) is a footballer who plays as a striker for Nueva Chicago on loan from Boca Juniors.

== Early life ==
He was born in 2004 in Argentina. He grew up in Buenos Aires, Argentina.

== Career ==
He began his career at Argentine club Boca Juniors. He helped the club's youth team win the U-20 Copa Libertadores and the. Intercontinental U-20 of the year 2023. He was runner-up in the Copa Libertadores U-20 edition 2024. In January 2025 he went on loan, transferred to Nueva Chicago of the Argentine Second Division.

== Personal life ==
He is of Uruguayan descent. He had a Uruguayan grandfather.
