= Nahuel Génez =

Argentine footballer

Personal information
- Full name: Nahuel Alejandro Génez
- Date of birth: 18 June 2003 (age 23)
- Place of birth: Carlos Spegazzini, Buenos Aires, Argentina
- Height: 1.73 m (5 ft 8 in)
- Position: Left-back

Team information
- Current team: Patronato (on loan from Boca Juniors)

Youth career
- Boca Juniors

Senior career*
Years	Team	Apps	(Gls)
2021–	Boca Juniors	2	(0)
2024	→ Tigre (loan)	8	(0)
2025	→ Temperley (loan)	21	(1)
2026–	→ Patronato (loan)	1	(0)

International career^{‡}
2022–2023	Argentina U20	8	(0)
- * Club domestic league appearances and goals as of 17:41, 23 March 2026 (UTC) ‡ National team caps and goals as of 28 January 2024

Nahuel Alejandro Génez (born 18 June 2003) is an Argentine professional footballer who plays as a left-back for Patronato, on loan from Boca Juniors.

== International career ==
Génez was called up to the Argentina national under-20 football team for the 2022 Maurice Revello Tournament in France.

In January 2023, he was once again called up to the national under-20 football team ahead of the 2023 South American Championship.

== Career statistics ==
=== Club ===
As of 18 August 2021.

Club	Season	League			Cup		League Cup		Continental		Other		Total	
Club	Season	Division	Apps	Goals	Apps	Goals	Apps	Goals	Apps	Goals	Apps	Goals	Apps	Goals
Boca Juniors	2021	Argentine Primera División	1	0	0	0	0	0	0	0	0	0	1	0
Boca Juniors	2022	Argentine Primera División	0	0	0	0	0	0	0	0	0	0	0	0
Boca Juniors	2023	Argentine Primera División	1	0	1	0	0	0	0	0	0	0	2	0
Tigre (loan)	2024	Argentine Primera División	0	0	1	0	7	0	–		0	0	8	0
Career total			2	0	2	0	7	0	0	0	0	0	11	0
