= U-20 Copa Libertadores =

CONMEBOL U-20 Libertadores
- Organizer(s): CONMEBOL
- Founded: 2011; 15 years ago
- Region: South America
- Teams: 12
- Qualifier for: Under-20 Intercontinental Cup
- Related competitions: Copa Libertadores
- Current champion(s): (Chile) Santiago Wanderers (1st title)
- Most championships: (Brazil) Flamengo (2 titles)
- Website: conmebol.com/libsub20
- 2026 U-20 Copa Libertadores

The CONMEBOL Under-20 Libertadores (Portuguese and Spanish: CONMEBOL Libertadores Sub 20) is the international association football club competition for teams that play in CONMEBOL leagues. It was created by Manuel Burga Seoane and the Peruvian Football Federation. The competition started in the 2011 season in response to the increased interest in youth football.

== History ==
The tournament had only two editions from 2011 to 2012. The first edition of this U-20 club competition was played in Lima, Peru. Players born on or after 1 January 1990 were eligible to compete in the first tournament, technically making it an under-21 competition. The tournament was originally going to be hosted in November 2010, however, because of the postponement, the player age eligibility was changed.

The tournament was temporarily discontinued after 2012. CONMEBOL was targeting to restart the competition in 2015. In March 2015, the CONMEBOL Executive Committee approved Paraguay as host of the next U-20 Copa Libertadores in January 2016.

== Format ==
The cup is played by twelve teams, one from each CONMEBOL country, divided in three groups of four clubs each. The group winners and the best second-placed team qualify to play the semifinals and the winners then play the final, while the losers play the third-place game.

== Winners ==
Ed.	Year	Host	Final			Third place match			Num. teams
Ed.	Year	Host	(gold) Champions	Score	(silver) Runners-up	(bronze) Third place	Score	Fourth place	Num. teams
1	2011	Peru	(Peru) Universitario	1–1 (4–2 p)	(Argentina) Boca Juniors	(Mexico) América	1–0	(Peru) Alianza Lima	12
2	2012	Peru	(Argentina) River Plate	1–0	(Uruguay) Defensor Sporting	(Brazil) Corinthians	2–1	(Chile) Unión Española	16
3	2016	Paraguay	(Brazil) São Paulo	1–0	(Uruguay) Liverpool	(Colombia) Cortuluá	1–0	(Argentina) Lanús	12
4	2018	Uruguay	(Uruguay) Nacional	2–1	(Ecuador) Independiente del Valle	(Uruguay) River Plate	1–1 (5–4 p)	(Brazil) São Paulo	12
5	2020	Paraguay	(Ecuador) Independiente del Valle	2–1	(Argentina) River Plate	(Brazil) Flamengo	5–2	(Paraguay) Libertad	12
6	2022	Ecuador	(Uruguay) Peñarol	1–1 (4–3 p)	(Ecuador) Independiente del Valle	(Paraguay) Guaraní	3–2	(Venezuela) Caracas	12
7	2023	Chile	(Argentina) Boca Juniors	2–0	(Ecuador) Independiente del Valle	(Paraguay) Cerro Porteño	2–2 (4–2 p)	(Uruguay) Peñarol	12
8	2024	Uruguay	(Brazil) Flamengo	2–1	(Argentina) Boca Juniors	(Argentina) Rosario Central	2–1	(Ecuador) Aucas	12
9	2025	Paraguay	(Brazil) Flamengo	1–1 (3–2 p)	(Brazil) Palmeiras	(Argentina) Belgrano	5–1	(Uruguay) Danubio	12
10	2026	Ecuador	(Chile) Santiago Wanderers	1–1 (5–4 p)	(Brazil) Flamengo	(Brazil) Palmeiras	1–1 (4–2 p)	(Paraguay) Olimpia	12

=== Performances by club ===
Performance in the U-20 Copa Libertadores by club
Club	Titles	Runners-up	Seasons won	Seasons runner-up
(Brazil) Flamengo	2	1	2024, 2025	2026
(Ecuador) Independiente del Valle	1	3	2020	2018, 2022, 2023
(Argentina) Boca Juniors	1	2	2023	2011, 2024
(Argentina) River Plate	1	1	2012	2020
(Peru) Universitario	1	0	2011	—
(Brazil) São Paulo	1	0	2016	—
(Uruguay) Nacional	1	0	2018	—
(Uruguay) Peñarol	1	0	2022	—
(Chile) Santiago Wanderers	1	0	2026	—
(Uruguay) Defensor Sporting	0	1	—	2012
(Uruguay) Liverpool	0	1	—	2016
(Brazil) Palmeiras	0	1	—	2025

=== Performances by nation ===
Performances in finals by nation
Nation	Titles	Runners-up	Total
Brazil	3	2	5
Argentina	2	3	5
Uruguay	2	2	4
Ecuador	1	3	4
Peru	1	0	1
Chile	1	0	1

== Honors ==
Year	Best Player Award	Top Goalscorer	Best Goalkeeper Award	Fair Play Award
2011	(Peru) Edison Flores	(Argentina) Sergio Unrein (4) (Peru) Cristofer Soto (4)	(Argentina) Ramiro Martínez	(Argentina) Boca Juniors
2012	(Ecuador) Juan Cazares	(Chile) Rodrigo Gattas (6)	(Argentina) Gaspar Servio	(Uruguay) Defensor Sporting (Argentina) River Plate (ex aequo)
2016	Not awarded	(Brazil) Luiz Araújo (5)	Not awarded	(Colombia) Cortuluá

== Performance by club ==
Legend

- 1st — Champions
- 2nd — Runners-up
- 3rd — Third place
- 4th — Fourth place
- QF — Quarterfinals
- GS — Group stage
- • — Did not qualify

Team	2011 (Peru)	2012 (Peru)	2016 (Paraguay)	2018 (Uruguay)	2020 (Paraguay)	2022 (Ecuador)	2023 (Chile)	2024 (Uruguay)	2025 (Paraguay)	2026 (Ecuador)	Total
(Venezuela) Academia Puerto Cabello	•	•	•	•	GS	•	•	GS	•	•	2
(Colombia) Águilas Doradas	•	•	•	•	•	•	•	GS	•	•	1
(Peru) Alianza Lima	4th	QF	•	•	•	•	GS	•	•	•	3
(Bolivia) Always Ready	•	•	•	•	•	•	GS	GS	•	•	2
(Brazil) América (MG)	•	QF	•	•	•	•	•	•	•	•	1
(Mexico) América	3rd	GS	•	•	•	•	•	•	•	•	2
(Spain) Atletico Madrid	•	GS	•	•	•	•	•	•	•	•	1
Atlético Venezuela	•	•	•	GS	•	•	•	•	•	•	1
(Ecuador) Aucas	•	•	•	•	•	•	•	4th	•	•	1
(Argentina) Belgrano	•	•	•	•	•	•	•	•	3rd	GS	2
(Bolivia) Blooming	•	GS	•	•	•	GS	•	•	GS	•	3
(Argentina) Boca Juniors	2nd	GS	•	•	•	•	1st	2nd	•	•	4
(Bolivia) Bolívar	•	•	GS	•	•	•	•	•	•	GS	2
(Venezuela) Caracas	GS	•	•	•	•	4th	GS	•	•	•	3
(Paraguay) Cerro Porteño	•	QF	GS	•	GS	•	3rd	•	GS	•	5
(Brazil) Corinthians	•	3rd	•	•	•	•	•	•	•	•	1
(Chile) Colo-Colo	•	•	•	GS	GS	•	•	GS	•	•	3
(Colombia) Cortuluá	•	•	3rd	•	•	•	•	•	•	•	1
(Brazil) Cruzeiro	•	•	•	GS	•	•	•	•	•	•	1
(Uruguay) Danubio	•	•	•	•	GS	•	•	•	4th	•	2
(Uruguay) Defensor Sporting	•	2nd	•	•	•	•	GS	GS	•	•	3
(Venezuela) Deportivo La Guaira	•	GS	GS	•	•	•	•	•	•	•	2
(Colombia) Envigado	•	•	•	•	•	•	GS	•	•	•	1
(Venezuela) Estudiantes de Mérida	•	•	•	•	•	•	•	•	•	GS	1
(Brazil) Flamengo	QF	•	•	•	3rd	•	•	1st	1st	2nd	5
(Colombia) Fortaleza	•	•	•	•	•	•	•	•	GS	•	1
(Paraguay) Guaraní	•	•	•	•	•	3rd	•	•	•	•	1
(Chile) Huachipato	•	•	GS	•	•	•	GS	•	•	•	2
(Ecuador) Independiente del Valle	QF	GS	GS	2nd	1st	2nd	2nd	•	GS	•	8
(Colombia) Independiente Medellín	•	•	•	•	•	•	•	•	•	GS	1
(Brazil) Internacional	•	•	•	•	•	GS	•	•	•	•	1
(Bolivia) Jorge Wilstermann	GS	•	•	•	GS	•	•	•	•	•	2
(Colombia) Junior	•	GS	•	•	•	•	•	•	•	•	1
(Argentina) Lanús	•	•	4th	•	•	•	•	•	•	•	1
(Colombia) La Equidad	•	•	•	GS	•	•	•	•	•	•	1
(Ecuador) LDU Quito	•	•	•	•	•	GS	•	•	•	GS	2
(Paraguay) Libertad	QF	•	GS	GS	4th	•	•	•	•	•	4
(Uruguay) Liverpool	•	•	2nd	•	•	•	•	•	•	•	1
(Peru) Melgar	•	•	GS	•	•	•	•	•	•	•	1
(Venezuela) Metropolitanos	•	•	•	•	•	•	•	•	GS	•	1
(Colombia) Millonarios	GS	•	•	•	GS	GS	•	•	•	•	3
(Uruguay) Montevideo City Torque	•	•	•	•	•	•	•	GS	•	•	1
(Uruguay) Nacional	QF	•	•	1st	GS	•	•	•	•	GS	4
(Argentina) Newell's Old Boys	•	•	•	•	•	GS	•	•	•	•	1
(Chile) O'Higgins	•	•	•	•	•	•	GS	•	GS	•	2
(Paraguay) Olimpia	•	•	•	•	•	•	•	GS	GS	4th	3
(Ecuador) Orense	•	•	•	•	•	GS	•	•	•	•	1
(Brazil) Palmeiras	•	•	•	•	•	•	GS	•	2nd	3rd	3
(Uruguay) Peñarol	•	•	•	•	•	1st	4th	•	•	•	2
(Bolivia) Quebracho	•	•	•	GS	•	•	•	•	•	•	1
(Argentina) River Plate	•	1st	GS	•	2nd	•	•	•	•	•	3
(Uruguay) River Plate	•	•	•	3rd	•	•	•	•	•	•	1
(Argentina) Rosario Central	•	•	•	•	•	•	•	3rd	•	•	1
(Chile) Santiago Wanderers	•	•	•	•	•	•	•	•	•	1st	1
(Peru) Sport Huancayo	•	•	•	GS	•	•	•	•	•	•	1
(Peru) Sporting Cristal	•	GS	•	•	GS	GS	•	GS	•	GS	5
(Brazil) São Paulo	•	•	1st	4th	•	•	•	•	•	•	2
(Argentina) Talleres	•	•	•	GS	•	•	•	•	•	•	1
(Chile) Universidad Católica	GS	•	•	•	•	•	•	•	•	•	1
(Ecuador) Universidad Católica	•	•	•	•	•	•	•	•	•	GS	1
(Chile) Universidad de Concepción	•	•	•	•	•	GS	•	•	•	•	1
(Peru) Universitario	1st	QF	•	•	•	•	•	•	GS	•	3
(Chile) Unión Española	•	4th	•	•	•	•	•	•	•	•	1
