= Silvio Rudman =

Argentine footballer and manager

Personal information
- Full name: Silvio Gabriel Rudman
- Date of birth: 3 May 1969 (age 57)
- Place of birth: Buenos Aires, Argentina
- Height: 1.85 m (6 ft 1 in)
- Position: Striker

Team information
- Current team: Boca Juniors U-20 (Manager)

Youth career
- Argentinos Juniors

Senior career*
Years	Team	Apps	(Gls)
1987–1990	Argentinos Juniors	71	(20)
1990–1991	Independiente	10	(3)
1991–1993	Veracruz	32	(13)
1992	→ Yokohama Flügels (loan)	25	(8)
1993–1994	Club Atlas	11	(1)
1994	Boca Juniors	10	(1)
1995–1996	Toros Neza	18	(3)
1996–1997	Padova	1	(0)
1997	Columbus Crew	6	(0)
1997	Veracruz	10	(3)
1998–1999	Elche	3	(0)
1999–2000	Marathón	11	(3)
2001	El Porvenir	18	(3)
2002	Deportivo Zacapa	1	(0)
2003–2004	Oaxaca	14	(4)
2003	→ San José (loan)	?	(2)
2004	Inter Rivira Maya	3	(0)
Total		244	(64)

Managerial career
- 2011: Lobos BUAP
- 2013–2014: Pachuca Reserves and Academy
- 2015: Alto Rendimiento Tuzo
- 2015–2016: Pachuca Premier
- 2016–2018: Tlaxcala
- 2018–2019: Zacatepec (Assistant)
- 2019: Monagas S.C.
- 2021: Tlaxcala
- 2022: Sololá
- 2023–: Boca Juniors Reserves
- * Club domestic league appearances and goals

Silvio Gabriel Rudman (born May 3, 1969) is an Argentinean football manager and former player. He is currently manager for Liga Nacional club Sololá.
