= Copa Iberoamericana =

- The trophy awarded to champions
- Organiser(s): CONMEBOL; RFEF
- Founded: 1994
- Abolished: 1994; 32 years ago
- Region: South America; Spain
- Teams: 2
- Related competitions: Copa Oro N. Leoz; Copa del Rey
- Most championships: (Spain) Real Madrid (1 title)

The Copa Iberoamericana (English: Ibero-American Cup) or Copa Iberia was a one-off international football competition. It was created to face the champions of the Copa de Oro Nicolás Leoz and the Copa del Rey, as a result of an agreement signed between CONMEBOL and the Royal Spanish Football Federation.

It was disputed only once between Boca Juniors and Real Madrid in 1994, with the Spanish club prevailing 4–3 on aggregate. In 2015, CONMEBOL included Copa Iberoamericana in the list of its official competitions.

== Qualified teams ==
Team	Qualification
(Argentina) Boca Juniors	1993 Copa de Oro winners
(Spain) Real Madrid	1992–93 Copa del Rey winners

== Venues ==
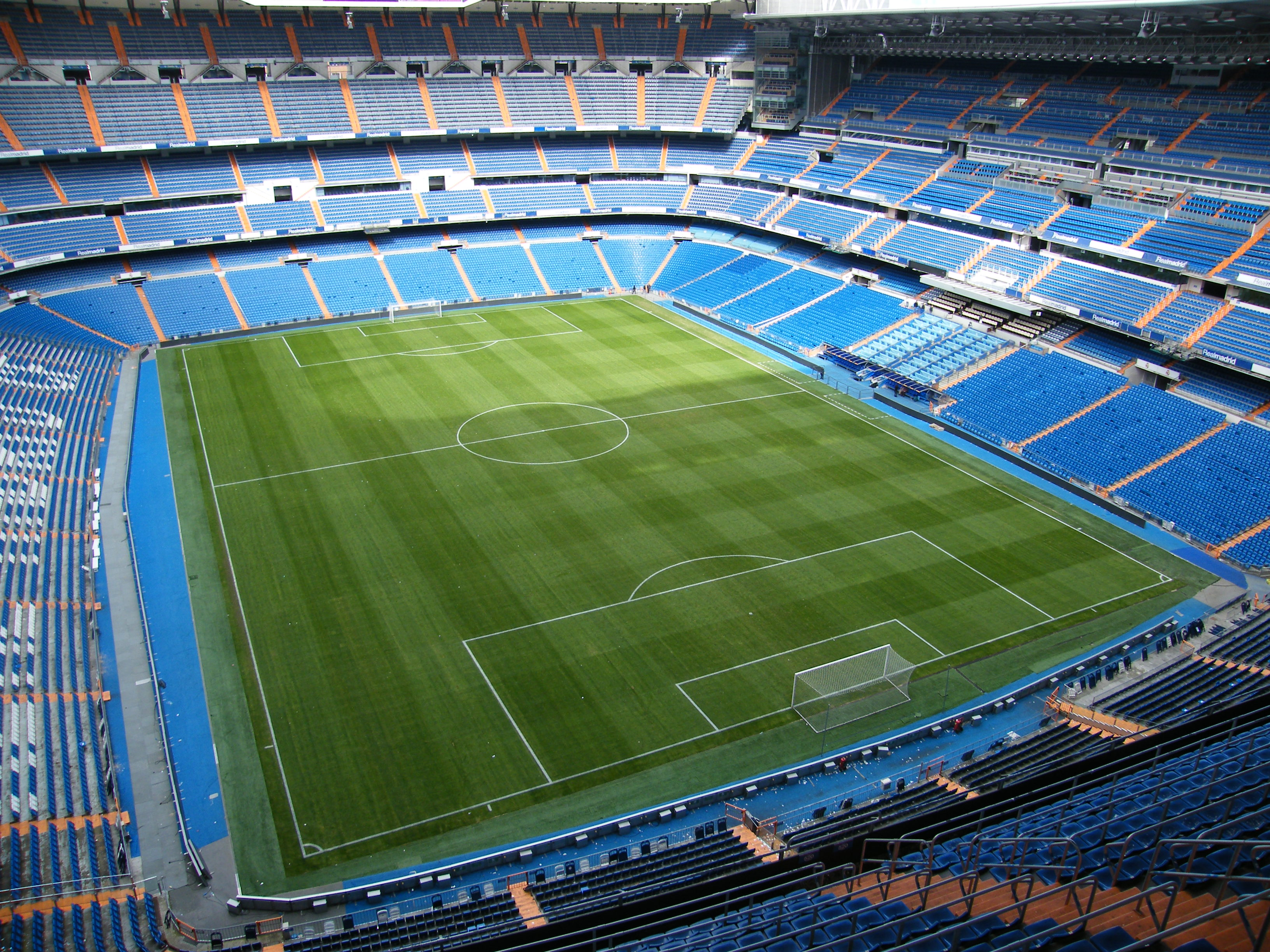
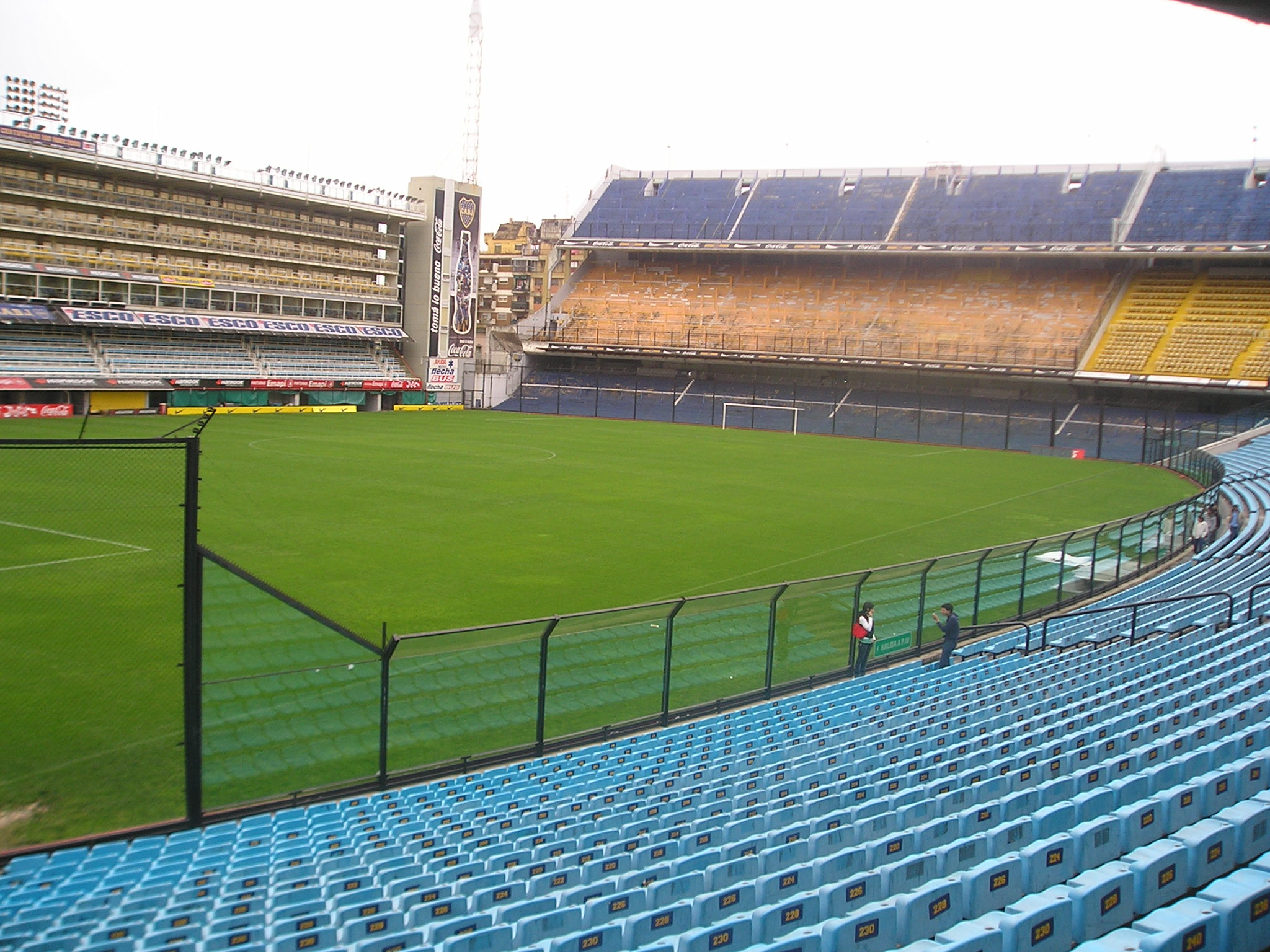
The Santiago Bernabéu and La Bombonera, venues for the series

== Match details ==
=== First leg ===
1994 Copa Iberoamericana
19 May 1994
21:00 CET
First leg

Real Madrid (Spain)	3–1	(Argentina) Boca Juniors
Hierro 34'; Morales 70', 79'	Report	Mac Allister 85'

Santiago Bernabéu, Madrid
Attendance: 10,000
Referee: Piero Ceccarini (Italy)

Real Madrid	Boca Juniors

GK	1	(Spain) Francisco Buyo
DF	2	(Spain) Jesús Velasco
DF	6	(Spain) Fernando Hierro
DF	4	(Spain) Rafael Alkorta
DF	3	(Spain) Mikel Lasa		(substituted off) 75'
MF	8	(Spain) Míchel
MF	5	(Spain) Luis Milla	(yellow card) 86'
MF	10	(Croatia) Robert Prosinečki		(substituted off) 46'
FW	7	(Spain) Dani		(substituted off) 67'
FW	11	(Spain) Rafael Martín Vázquez
FW	9	(Chile) Iván Zamorano
Substitutes:
DF	4	(Spain) Nando		(substituted on) 75'
MF	15	(Spain) Sandro		(substituted on) 46'
FW	17	(Spain) José Luis Morales		(substituted on) 67'
Manager:
(Spain) Vicente del Bosque

GK	1	(Argentina) Navarro Montoya	(red card) 2'
DF	4	(Argentina) Diego Soñora
DF	2	(Argentina) Juan Simón
DF	6	(Argentina) Carlos Moya
DF	3	(Argentina) Carlos Mac Allister	(yellow card) 33'
MF	8	(Argentina) Julio Saldaña
MF	5	(Argentina) Leonardo Peralta
MF	10	(Argentina) Alberto Márcico
FW	7	(Uruguay) Sergio Martínez		(substituted off) 2'
FW	9	(Uruguay) Rubén da Silva		(substituted off) 67'
FW	11	(Chile) Ivo Basay		(substituted off) 70'
Substitutes:
GK	12	(Argentina) Esteban Pogany		(substituted on) 2'
FW	16	(Argentina) Luis Alberto Carranza		(substituted on) 67'
MF	15	(Argentina) Carlos Tapia		(substituted on) 70'
Manager:
(Argentina) César Luis Menotti

=== Second leg ===
25 May 1994
17:00 UTC−3
Second leg

Boca Juniors (Argentina)	2–1	(Spain) Real Madrid
da Silva 40'; Naveda 73'	Report	Milla 74'

La Bombonera, Buenos Aires
Attendance: 35,000
Referee: Jorge Nieves (Uruguay)

Boca Juniors	Real Madrid

GK	1	(Argentina) Esteban Pogany	Yellow card
DF	4	(Argentina) Julio Saldaña		(substituted off) 26'
DF	2	(Argentina) Luis Adrián Medero
DF	6	(Ecuador) Raúl Noriega
DF	3	(Argentina) Rodolfo Arruabarrena
MF	8	(Argentina) Alejandro Farías
MF	5	(Argentina) Alberto Naveda
MF	7	(Uruguay) Marcelo Tejera
MF	10	(Argentina) Carlos Daniel Tapia
FW	9	(Uruguay) Rubén da Silva
FW	11	(Argentina) Luis Alberto Carranza
Substitutes:
DF	13	(Argentina) Carlos Moya		(substituted on) 26'
Manager:
(Argentina) César Luis Menotti

GK	1	(Spain) Francisco Buyo
DF	2	(Spain) Chendo
DF	3	(Spain) Marcos
DF	4	(Spain) Nando
DF	5	(Spain) Luis Milla
MF	6	(Spain) Mikel Antía
MF	7	(Spain) Velasco	Yellow card	(substituted off) 87'
MF	8	(Spain) Míchel
FW	9	(Spain) Dani		(substituted off) 80'
FW	10	(Croatia) Robert Prosinečki
FW	11	(Spain) Martín Vázquez
Substitutes:
DF	14	(Spain) Luis Miguel Ramis		(substituted on) 87'
FW	16	(Spain) José Luis Morales		(substituted on) 80'
Manager:
(Spain) Vicente del Bosque

Real Madrid won 4–3 on aggregate

== See also ==
- Copa Euro-América
