= José Luis Morales (footballer, born 1973) =

Spanish footballer

Personal information
- Full name: José Luis Morales Martín
- Date of birth: 2 August 1973 (age 53)
- Place of birth: Madrid, Spain
- Height: 1.70 m (5 ft 7 in)
- Position: Forward

Youth career
- 1981–1992: Real Madrid

Senior career*
Years	Team	Apps	(Gls)
1992–1993	Real Madrid C		
1993–1994	Real Madrid B	33	(17)
1994	Real Madrid	7	(2)
1994–1995	Sporting Gijón	35	(6)
1995–1996	Mallorca	24	(15)
1996–1998	Logroñés	54	(7)
1998–2000	Numancia	17	(3)
2000	Salamanca	16	(2)
2000	New England Revolution	10	(1)
2001	Jaén	3	(0)
2001	Gimnástica	11	(3)
2001–2002	Santa Clara	4	(1)
2002–2003	Palamós	5	(1)
2003–2004	Móstoles		
Total		219	(58)

International career
1989–1990	Spain U16	6	(3)
1990–1991	Spain U17	8	(3)
1991	Spain U18	6	(1)
1994–1995	Spain U21	7	(2)
- * Club domestic league appearances and goals

José Luis Morales Martín (born 2 August 1973) is a Spanish former professional footballer who played as a forward.

== Club career ==
=== Real Madrid ===
Born in Madrid, Morales joined Real Madrid's academy at the age of eight. He made his La Liga debut with the first team on 5 February 1994, opening a 2–0 win against Deportivo de La Coruña through a bicycle kick; his other goal also awarded a home victory, 1–0 over Atlético Madrid two weeks later.

On 19 May 1994, Morales netted twice in the first leg of the Copa Iberoamericana, helping the hosts to beat Boca Juniors 3–1. Again as a substitute, he also took the field in the second game, a 2–1 loss at La Bombonera.

=== Journeyman and Mallorca ===
After leaving the Santiago Bernabéu Stadium in summer 1994, Morales represented sides in both the top division and the Segunda División. In the 1995–96 season, he scored a career-best 15 goals for second-tier Mallorca in spite of only having been there six months, eight coming in his first six appearances.

=== New England Revolution ===
Morales signed for the New England Revolution on 10 July 2000 after a week-long trial, filling the club's fourth and final foreign spot and becoming in the process the first Spaniard to take part in the Major League Soccer. He made his debut nine days later in a 1–0 defeat of the Kansas City Wizards. He scored his only goal on 30 August, the only in a home win over D.C. United; this helped them to qualify for the playoffs for the second time in their history, where he provided the assist for Mauricio Wright's winner against Chicago Fire in the second match of the series for a first-ever victory at that stage.

On 1 November 2000, the Revolution elected not to exercise the option on Morales' contract.

=== Later career ===
Morales' last experience in top-flight football was in the 2001–02 campaign with Santa Clara of the Portuguese Primeira Liga, scoring in a 1–1 draw at Belenenses on 6 January 2002. He retired at the age of 31, following a spell in the Tercera División with Móstoles.

== International career ==
Morales won seven caps for Spain at under-21 level, scoring twice.

== Honours ==
Real Madrid

- Copa Iberoamericana: 1994
