= 1942 Copa Escobar-Gerona =

- Event: Copa Escobar-Gerona
Peñarol	San Lorenzo
(Uruguay)	(Argentina)
-	-
- Unfinished, no champion crowned

First leg
Peñarol	San Lorenzo
4	1
- Date: 25 August 1943
- Venue: Estadio Centenario, Montevideo
- Referee: Aníbal Tejada

Second leg
San Lorenzo	Peñarol
-	-
- Date: (not held)

The 1942 Copa Escobar-Gerona, also named Copa de Confraternidad Rioplatense, was the 2nd. edition of the competition organised jointly by the Argentine and Uruguayan associations.

San Lorenzo (Argentine Primera División runner-up) faced Peñarol (Uruguayan Primera División runner-up) in a two-legged series. The first match was played at Estadio Centenario in Montevideo, where Peñarol beat San Lorenzo 4–1. As the second leg in Buenos Aires was never held, the tournament was declared unfinished, leaving the title vacant, the same situation as previous edition.

== Qualified teams ==
Team	Qualification	Previous app.
(Argentina) San Lorenzo	1942 Primera División runner-up	(none)
(Uruguay) Peñarol	1942 Primera División runner-up	(none)

Note

- **Bold** indicates winning years

== Venues ==
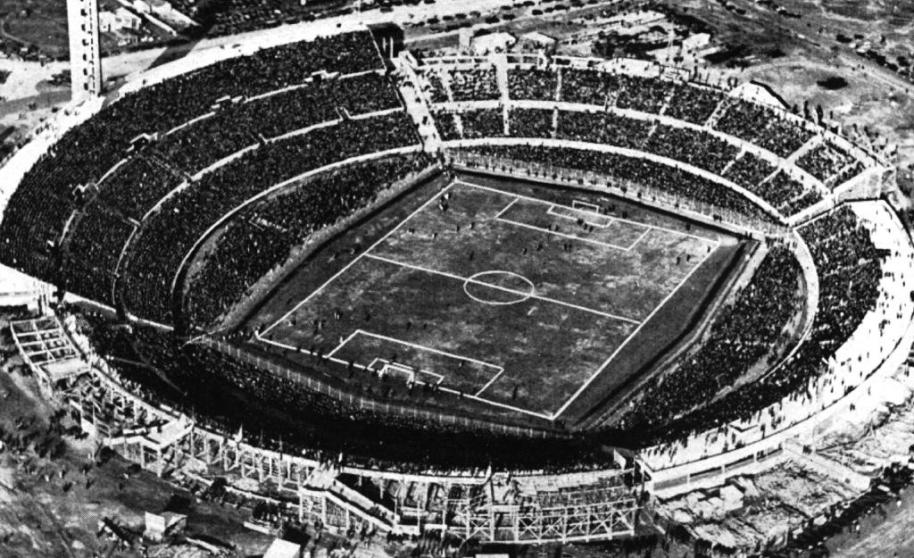
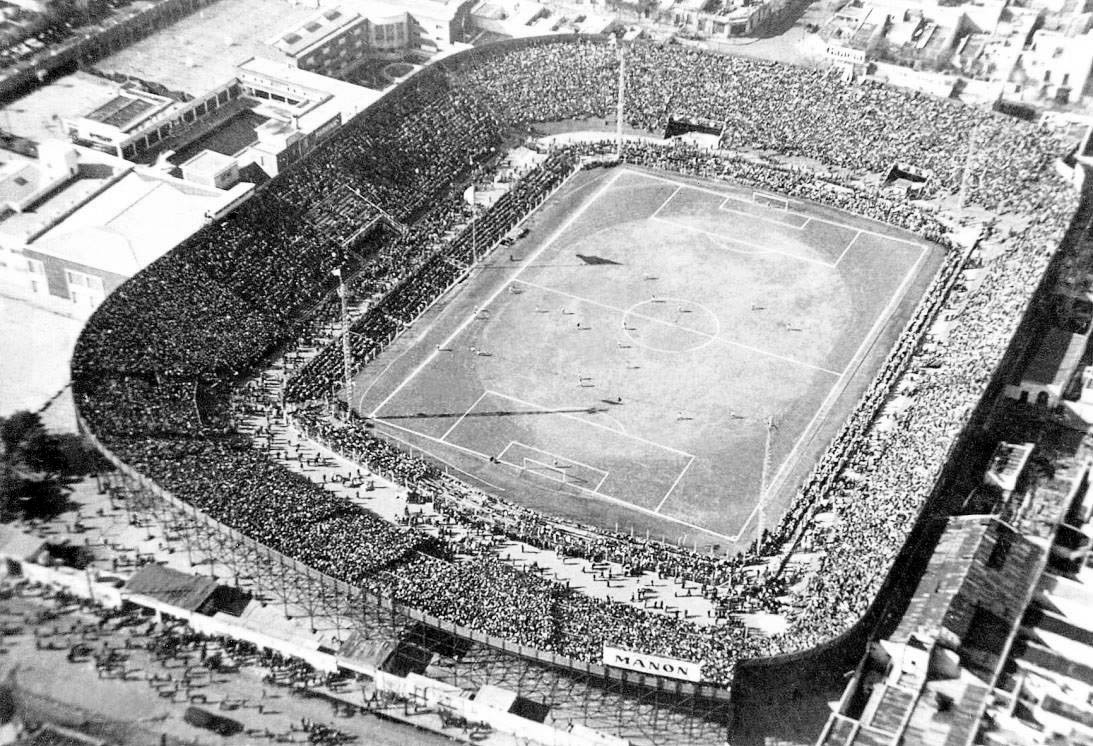
Centenario (left) and San Lorenzo stadiums, venues for the matches

== Match details ==
=== First leg ===
1942 Copa Escobar-Gerona
25 August 1943
First leg

Peñarol (Uruguay)	4–1	(Argentina) San Lorenzo
Chirimini; Pino; Varela; La Paz	Report	Martino

Estadio Centenario, Montevideo
Referee: Aníbal Tejada

**Peñarol**	**San Lorenzo**

GK	(Uruguay) Roque Máspoli
DF	(Uruguay) Agustín Prado
DF	(Uruguay) Joaquín Bermúdez
MF	(Uruguay) Luis Vecino
MF	(Uruguay) Obdulio Varela
MF	(Uruguay) De León
FW	(Uruguay) José M. Ortiz
FW	(Uruguay) Oscar Chirimini	(substituted off) a'
FW	(Uruguay) José A. Vázquez
FW	(Uruguay) Lorenzo Pino
FW	(Argentina) Raúl Emeal
Substitutes:
FW	(Uruguay) Domingo Gelpi	(substituted on) a'
Manager:
(Hungary) Pedro de Hegedüs

GK	(Argentina) Luis Heredia	(substituted off) a'
DF	(Argentina) José A. Vanzini
DF	(Argentina) Ignacio Díaz
MF	(Argentina) Ángel Zubieta
MF	(Argentina) Salvador Grecco
MF	(Argentina) José Arnaldo
FW	(Argentina) Juan C. Heredia
FW	(Argentina) Mario Fernández
FW	(Argentina) Tomás Etchepare
FW	(Argentina) Rinaldo Martino
FW	(Argentina) Francisco De la Mata
Substitutes:
GK	(Argentina) Mierko Blazina	(substituted on) a'
Manager:
(Argentina) Diego García

=== Second leg ===
(not held)

San Lorenzo (Argentina)	–	(Uruguay) Peñarol
