= 1913 Club Atlético Boca Juniors season =

Boca Juniors
1913 season
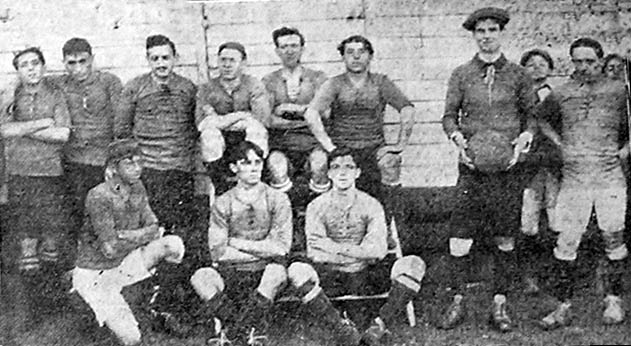
- Team that played the first official Superclásico on 24 August
- President: Juan Briccetto
- Manager: (none)
- Stadium: Estudiantes (BA)
- Primera División: 5th.
- Copa Jockey Club: Eliminated in quarterfinal
- Top goalscorer: League: All: Francisco Taggino (8)
- Biggest win: Boca Jrs. 6–0; Ferrocarril Sud (6 July)
Home colours

The 1913 Club Atlético Boca Juniors season was the squad's debuting season in Argentine Primera División, the top division of the Argentine league system, after having been promoted by the Argentine Football Association on February 10, along with Banfield, C.A. Comercio, Estudiantil Porteño, Ferrocarril Sud, Olivos, Platense, and Riachuelo.

Boca Juniors' debut in Primera was on April 13 v Estudiantil Porteño, a 4–2 win as visitor with 3 goals scored by Arnulfo Leal. Boca Juniors finished 5th. at its first season in Primera División, playing a total of 14 matches. The team won 8, lost 4 and drew 2, scoring 29 goals and conceding 16. In 1913 Boca also played the first official match v arch-rival River Plate, known as the Superclásico, held in Estadio Racing Club, were Boca was defeated by River Plate by 2–1.

By that time, Boca had been evicted from the field in Dársena Sud so the team played their home venues at Club Atlético Estudiantes stadium located in Palermo (Note: C.A. Estudiantes Stadium was located on Blandengues (current Avenida del Libertador) and Oro in Palermo, Buenos Aires.) for most part of the championship, also playing at Riachuelo stadium the last matches. With its debut in Primera División, Boca Juniors also introduced its classic horizontal gold band instead of the diagonal design used until then.

== Squad ==
Note: Flags indicate national team as defined under FIFA eligibility rules; some limited exceptions apply. Players may hold more than one non-FIFA nationality.

No.	Pos.	Nation	Player
—	GK	ARG	Juan Virtú Bidone
—	GK	ARG	Juan Bruzán
—	DF	ARG	Horacio Lamelas
—	DF	ARG	Juan L. Garibaldi
—	DF	ARG	Octavio Cichero
—	MF	ARG	Policarpo Martínez
—	MF	ARG	Miguel Valentini
—	MF	ARG	Miguel Elena
—	MF	ARG	Carlos Capellini
—	MF	ARG	Marcelino Vergara
—	MF	ARG	Juan B. Priano
—	MF	ARG	Luis Giardini
—	MF	ARG	Rodolfo Raddavero
—	MF	ARG	Alfredo Frattini
—	FW	ARG	Pedro Calomino

No.	Pos.	Nation	Player
—	FW	ARG	Francisco Taggino
—	FW	ARG	Donato Abbatángelo (c)
—	FW	ARG	Enrique Bertolini
—	FW	URU	Ángel Romano
—	FW	ARG	Martín González
—	FW	BRA	Arnulfo Leal
—	FW	ARG	Antonio Lodeiro
—	FW	ARG	Américo Repetto
—	FW	ARG	Daniel Caso
—	FW	ARG	Marcos Mayer
—	FW	ARG	Bartolomé Chiappori
—	FW	ARG	Juan Gelmi
—	FW	ARG	Marcos Micetich
—	FW	ARG	Atilio Somovigo

== Matches ==
= Won; = Drew; = Lost

=== Primera División ===
After the schism in Argentine football of 1912, there were two parallel competitions, the official league (where Boca Juniors played, formed by 15 teams) and dissident Federación Argentina de Football (with 10 teams competing). Boca Juniors finished 5th. to champion Racing Club, with 18 points in 14 matches.

13 April 1	Estudiantil Porteño	2–4	Boca Juniors	Ramos Mejía
	Doyer 2'; Tula 79'	Report	Leal 24', 47', 73'; Abbatángelo 82'	Stadium: Estudiantil Porteño; Referee: Perkins

20 April 2	Estudiantes (BA)	1–4	Boca Juniors	Buenos Aires
	Susan 26'	Report	Taggino 42', 50', 57'; Leal 48'	Stadium: Estudiantes; Referee: Bergalli

27 April 3	Riachuelo	0–3	Boca Juniors	Buenos Aires
		Report	Calomino 10' (pen.); M. González 18' (pen.); Taggino 65'	Stadium: Riachuelo; Referee: Perkins

1 May 4	San Isidro	1–0	Boca Juniors	San Isidro
	Pocok 65'	Report		Stadium: 25 de Mayo y R. Sánez Peña; Referee: Hugo Gondra

11 May 5	Boca Juniors	1–1	Banfield	Buenos Aires
	Leal 56'	Report	Chiarello 35'	Stadium: Estudiantes BA; Referee: Rolón

18 May 6	Boca Juniors	w–o (Note: As players of the rival team did not attend the match, points were awarded to Boca Juniors.)	Olivos
		Report

25 May 7	Boca Juniors	3–2	Belgrano A.C.	Buenos Aires
	Abbatángelo 7', 42'; Calomino 80'	Report	Bradburi 25', 60'	Stadium: Estudiantes BA; Referee: Rolón

22 Jun 8	Comercio	0–2	Boca Juniors	Buenos Aires
		Report	Caso 44'; Bertolini 61'	Stadium: Comercio; Referee: Rolón

6 Jul 9	Boca Juniors	6–0	Ferrocarril Sud	Buenos Aires
		Report	Calomino 11', 17', 72'; Taggino 27', 39'; Abbatángelo 89'	Stadium: River Plate (Note: Located in La Boca.); Referee: Perkins

20 Jul 10	Quilmes	2–1	Boca Juniors	Quilmes
	Weiss 50'; Hoare 63'	Report	Bertolini 60'	Stadium: Quilmes; Referee: Hugo Gondra

24 August 11	Boca Juniors	1–2	River Plate	Avellaneda
	Mayer 70'	Report	C. García 23'; A. Pereyra 47'	Stadium: Estadio Racing Club; Referee: Paddy Mac Carthy

30 August 12	Ferro Carril Oeste	2–2	Boca Juniors	Buenos Aires
	Duffresne 11'; Leal 35'	Report	Abbatángelo 3'; Calomino 22'	Stadium: Ferro C. Oeste

31 August 13	Platense	3–1	Boca Juniors	Buenos Aires
	Pérez 8'; Anaratone 52'; Cotero 80'	Report	Taggino 5'	Stadium: Platense

7 September 14	Boca Juniors	1–0	Racing Club	Buenos Aires
	Bertolini 40'	Report		Stadium: Estudiantes BA; Referee: Hugo Gondra

12 October 15	Boca Juniors	4–2	Estudiantil Porteño	Buenos Aires
	Taggino 25'; Calomino 36'; Romano 61', 80'	Report	Negri 53', 71'	Stadium: Estudiantes BA; Referee: Hugo Gondra

19 October 16	Boca Juniors	w–o	Quilmes
		Report

26 October 17	Boca Juniors	2–1	Comercio	Buenos Aires
	Repetto 20', 87'	Report	Romero 73'	Stadium: Riachuelo; Referee: Barbera

9 November 18	Boca Juniors	0–0	San Isidro	Buenos Aires
		Report		Stadium: Riachuelo; Referee: Hugo Gondra

30 November 19	Boca Juniors	w–o	Estudiantes (BA)
		Report

=== Final standings ===
- considered only the first 14 matches.

Pos	Team	Pld	W	D	L	GF	GA	GD	Pts
1	Racing (C)	14	12	0	2	41	5	+36	24
2	San Isidro	14	11	2	1	44	8	+36	24
3	River Plate	14	10	4	0	30	7	+23	24
4	Belgrano A.C.	14	8	2	4	34	16	+18	18
5	Boca Juniors	14	8	2	4	29	16	+13	18

Source: https://www.rsssf.org/tablesa/arg13.html
(C) Champions

== Other competitions ==
=== Copa de Competencia Jockey Club ===
Additional source:

8 Jun Group of 16	Boca Juniors	2–1	Argentino (R)	Buenos Aires
	Calomino 34'; González 43'	Report	Araya 66' (pen.)	Stadium: Estudiantes BA; Referee: Alfano

8 Jun Quarterfinal	San Isidro	2–1	Boca Juniors	San Isidro
	Fernández 13'; Lamelas 30' (o.g.)	Report	Bertolini 58'	Stadium: 25 de Mayo y Sáenz Peña; Referee: Bergalli

Boca Juniors was eliminated

== Friendly matches ==
16 Feb 1	Paraná (Zárate)	2–2	Boca Juniors	Zárate
	Campanero 2'; Vazquez 79'	Report	Bertolini 80'; Chiappori 86'	Stadium: C.A. Paraná; Referee: Rithner

16 Mar 2	Racing Club	3–1	Boca Juniors	Avellaneda
	Marcovecchio 32', 54'; Ohaco 65'	Report	Malespada 88'	Stadium: Estadio Racing Club; Referee: Suñé

20 Mar 3	Estudiantes (BA)	5–4	Boca Juniors	Buenos Aires
	Garibaldi 7' (o.g.); Susán 13', 28', 54'	Report	Calomino 47', 76'; Abbatángelo 49'; Taggino 73'	Stadium: Estudiantes BA; Referee: Zago

23 Mar 4	Banfield	3–4	Boca Juniors	Banfield
	Rohn 5' (pen.); Puig 47'; Marini 75'	Report	Taggino 44'; Calomino 70', 71' ?	Stadium: Banfield

6 Apr 5	Racing Club	0–0	Boca Juniors	Avellaneda
		Report		Stadium: Estadio Racing Club; Referee: Seminario

== Statistics ==
=== Players statistics ===
No.	Pos	Nat	Player	Total		Primera División	
No.	Pos	Nat	Player	Apps	Goals	Apps	Goals
	DF	(Argentina) ARG	Horacio Lamelas	16	0	16	0
	FW	(Argentina) ARG	Pedro Calomino	15	7	15	7
	DF	(Argentina) ARG	Juan L. Garibaldi	15	0	15	0
	GK	(Argentina) ARG	Juan Virtú Bidone	15	0	15	0
	FW	(Argentina) ARG	Francisco Taggino	14	8	14	8
	MF	(Argentina) ARG	Policarpo Martínez	14	0	14	0
	FW	(Argentina) ARG	Donato Abbatángelo	12	5	12	5
	MF	(Argentina) ARG	Miguel Valentini	12	0	12	0
	MF	(Argentina) ARG	Miguel Elena	11	0	11	0
	FW	(Argentina) ARG	Enrique Bertolini	10	3	10	3
	FW	(Uruguay) URU	Ángel Romano	9	2	9	2
	FW	(Argentina) ARG	Martín González	6	1	6	1
	FW	(Brazil) BRA	Arnulfo Leal	5	5	5	5
	MF	(Argentina) ARG	Marcelino Vergara	3	0	3	0
	MF	(Argentina) ARG	Carlos Capellini	2	0	2	0
	MF	(Argentina) ARG	Luis Giardini	2	0	2	0
	FW	(Argentina) ARG	Antonio Lodeiro	2	0	2	0
	MF	(Argentina) ARG	Juan B. Priano	2	0	2	0
	FW	(Argentina) ARG	Américo Repetto	1	2	1	2
	FW	(Argentina) ARG	Daniel Caso	1	1	1	1
	FW	(Argentina) ARG	Marcos Mayer	1	1	1	1
	GK	(Argentina) ARG	Juan Bruzán	1	0	1	0
	FW	(Argentina) ARG	Bartolomé Chiappori	1	0	1	0
	DF	(Argentina) ARG	Octavio Cichero	1	0	1	0
	DF	(Argentina) ARG	Alfredo Frattini	1	0	1	0
	FW	(Argentina) ARG	Juan Gelmi	1	0	1	0
	FW	(Argentina) ARG	Marcos Micetich	1	0	1	0
	MF	(Argentina) ARG	Rodolfo Raddavero	1	0	1	0
	FW	(Argentina) ARG	Atilio Somovigo	1	0	1	0

- Source: https://historiadeboca.com.ar/campeonato-1913/1913/1000.html
