= 1941 Copa Escobar-Gerona =

- Event: Copa Escobar-Gerona
Peñarol	San Lorenzo
(Uruguay)	(Argentina)
-	-
- Unfinished, no champion crowned

First leg
Peñarol	San Lorenzo
1	2
- Date: 29 March 1942
- Venue: Estadio Centenario, Montevideo
- Referee: Nobel Valentini

Second leg
San Lorenzo	Peñarol
-	-
- Date: (not held)

The 1941 Copa Escobar-Gerona, also named Copa de Confraternidad Rioplatense, was the first edition of the competition organised jointly by the Argentine and Uruguayan associations.

San Lorenzo (Argentine Primera División runner-up) faced Peñarol (Uruguayan Primera División runner-up) in a two-legged series. The first match was played at Estadio Centenario in Montevideo, where San Lorenzo won 2–1. As the second leg in Buenos Aires was never held, the tournament was declared unfinished, leaving the title vacant.

== Qualified teams ==
Team	Qualification	Previous app.
(Argentina) San Lorenzo	1941 Primera División runner-up	(none)
(Uruguay) Peñarol	1941 Primera División runner-up	(none)

Note

- **Bold** indicates winning years

== Venues ==
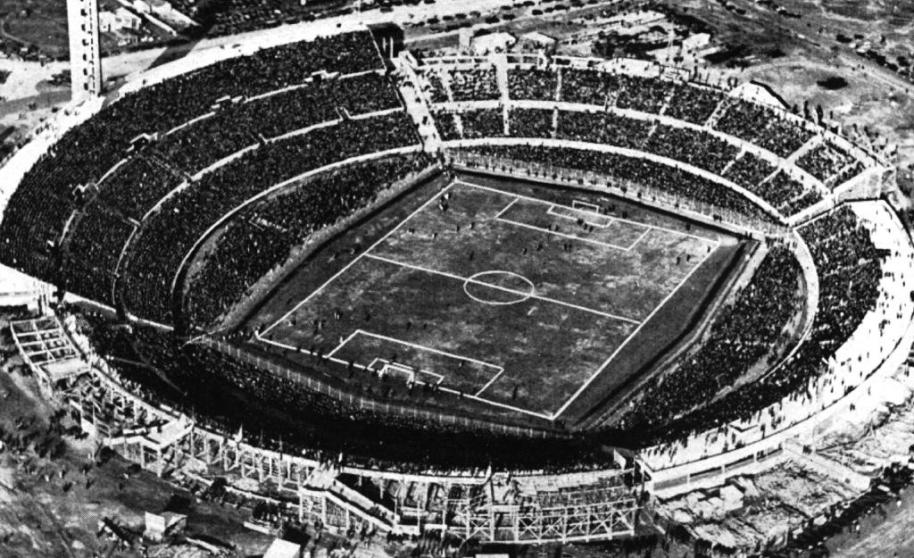
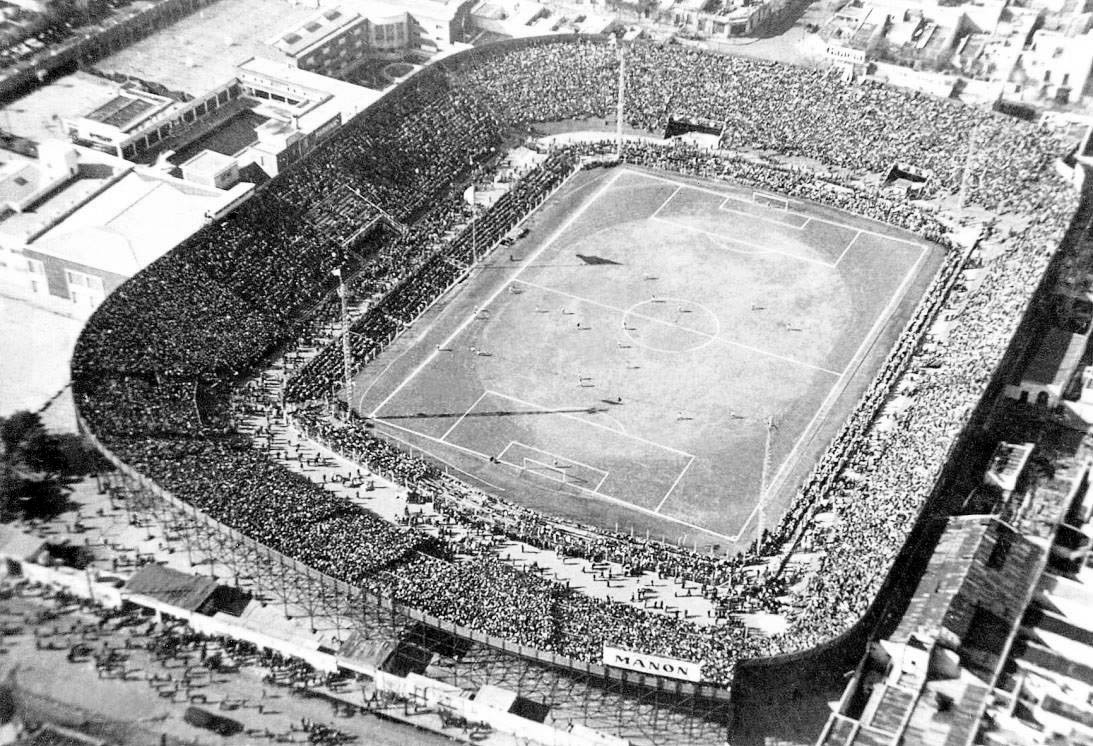
Centenario (left) and San Lorenzo stadiums, venues for the matches

== Match details ==
=== First leg ===
1941 Copa Escobar-Gerona
29 March 1942
First leg

Peñarol (Uruguay)	1–2	(Argentina) San Lorenzo
Varela 23'	Report	Martino 9'; Lángara 38'

Estadio Centenario, Montevideo
Referee: Nobel Valentini

**Peñarol**	**San Lorenzo**

GK	(Uruguay) Roque Máspoli
DF	(Uruguay) Joaquín Bermúdez
DF	(Uruguay) Agenor Muñiz
MF	(Uruguay) Raúl Rodríguez
MF	(Uruguay) Oscar Díaz
MF	(Uruguay) Darío Piñeiro
FW	(Uruguay) José M. Ortiz
FW	(Uruguay) Severino Varela
FW	(Uruguay) José A. Vázquez
FW	(Uruguay) Antonio Álvarez
FW	(Uruguay) Amador Regueiro
Manager:
(Uruguay) John Harley

GK	(Argentina) Luis Heredia
DF	(Argentina) Ernesto González
DF	(Argentina) Eduardo Crespi
MF	(Argentina) Ángel Zubieta
MF	(Argentina) Salvador Grecco
MF	(Argentina) José Arnaldo
FW	(Argentina) Juan Fattoni
FW	(Argentina) Alfredo Borgnia
FW	(Spain) Isidro Lángara
FW	(Argentina) Rinaldo Martino
FW	(Argentina) Bartolomé Colombo
Manager:
(Argentina) Diego García

=== Second leg ===
(not held)

San Lorenzo (Argentina)	–	(Uruguay) Peñarol
