= Balthazar Bernardi =

Argentine footballer

Personal information
- Full name: Yago Balthazar Bernardi Gutierrez
- Date of birth: 10 August 2001 (age 25)
- Place of birth: Buenos Aires, Argentina
- Height: 1.87 m (6 ft 2 in)
- Position: Center-back

Team information
- Current team: Estudiantes BA (on loan from Boca Juniors)

Youth career
- Boca Juniors

Senior career*
Years	Team	Apps	(Gls)
2021–	Boca Juniors	2	(0)
2021–2022	→ Akritas Chlorakas (loan)	26	(7)
2024–2025	→ Arsenal Sarandí (loan)	28	(1)
2025–	→ Estudiantes BA (loan)	17	(0)
- * Club domestic league appearances and goals as of 16:02, 28 April 2026 (UTC)

Yago Balthazar Bernardi Gutierrez (born 10 August 2001) is an Argentine footballer currently playing as a center-back for Estudiantes BA, on loan from Boca Juniors.

== Career statistics ==
=== Club ===
As of 18 August 2021.

Club	Season	League			Cup		Continental		Other		Total	
Club	Season	Division	Apps	Goals	Apps	Goals	Apps	Goals	Apps	Goals	Apps	Goals
Boca Juniors	2021	Argentine Primera División	2	0	0	0	0	0	0	0	2	0
Akritas Chlorakas (loan)	2021–22	Cypriot Second Division	25	6	1	1	0	0	0	0	26	7
Career total			27	6	1	1	0	0	0	0	28	7
