= Carlos Daniel Tapia =

Argentine footballer

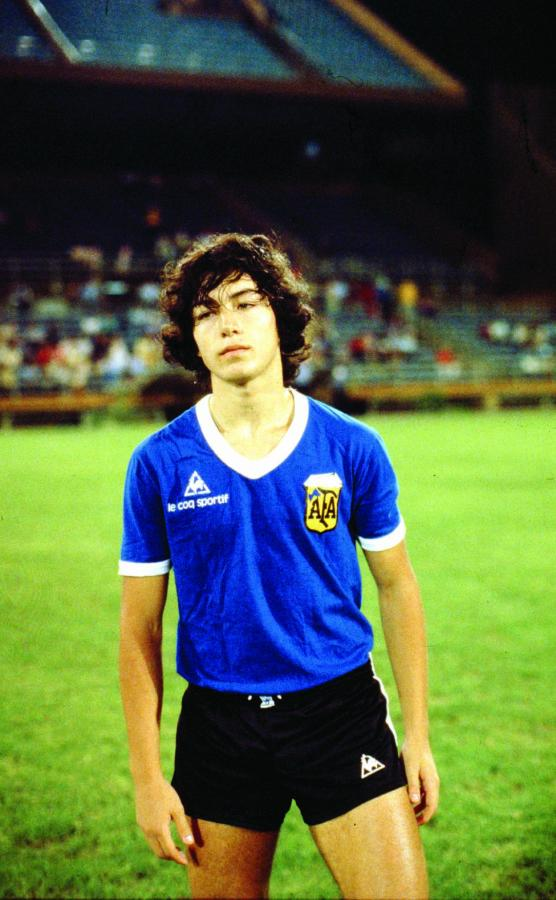
- Tapia with the Argentina U20 in 1981

Personal information
- Full name: Carlos Daniel Tapia
- Date of birth: 20 August 1962 (age 64)
- Place of birth: San Miguel, Buenos Aires, Argentina
- Height: 1.73 m (5 ft 8 in)
- Position: Attacking midfielder

Senior career*
Years	Team	Apps	(Gls)
1980–1984	River Plate	105	(14)
1985–1987	Boca Juniors	77	(35)
1987–1988	Brest	15	(1)
1988–1989	Boca Juniors	10	(5)
1989–1990	Deportivo Mandiyú	16	(0)
1990	Universidad de Chile	8	(3)
1990–1991	Boca Juniors	33	(2)
1991–1992	Lugano	12	(0)
1992–1994	Boca Juniors	28	(0)
Total		304	(60)

International career
1981	Argentina U20	1	(0)
1980–1988	Argentina	10	(1)
Medal record
Men's football
Representing Argentina
FIFA World Cup
Winner	1986 Mexico
- * Club domestic league appearances and goals

Carlos Daniel Tapia (born 20 August 1962 in San Miguel, Buenos Aires) is an Argentine former professional footballer who played as an attacking midfielder. Although Tapia started out at River Plate, he distinguished during his three stints with rivals club, Boca Juniors, and also in the Argentina national team where he won the FIFA World Cup in 1986.

== Career ==
Tapia started playing professional football for Argentine club River Plate in 1981, when then coach Alfredo Di Stéfano named him for the first team, replacing football legend Norberto Alonso.

In 1985, he would move to River's hated rivals Boca Juniors. He was a member of the Argentine squad that won the 1986 World Cup, though he played only a few minutes during the tournament. He replaced Jorge Burruchaga in the match against England and hit the post with his shot. He is one of the two Boca players to win the title, the other being Julio Olarticoechea.

Tapia is the only player in the history of Boca Juniors to have had four distinct spells with the club. In his last spell with Boca he helped them win the Apertura 1992 championship, their first league title in 11 years and the Copa Oro in 1993. He played a total of 217 games for Boca in all competitions, scoring 46 goals.

Abroad, Tapia played for Brest in France, Lugano in Switzerland and Universidad de Chile in Chile.

Tapia retired in 1994.

== Honours ==
River Plate

- Primera División: 1980 Metropolitano, 1981 Nacional

Boca Juniors

- Primera División: 1992 Apertura
- Supercopa Libertadores: 1989
- Recopa Sudamericana: 1990
- Copa de Oro: 1993
- Copa Iberoamericana runner-up: 1994

Argentina

- FIFA World Cup: 1986
