= Copa Escobar-Gerona =

Copa de Confraternidad Escobar-Gerona
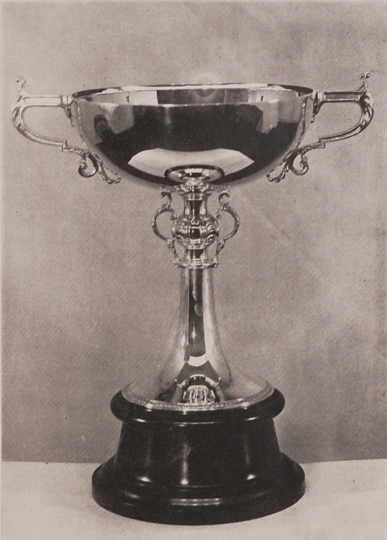
- The trophy awarded to champions
- Organiser(s): (Argentina) AFA (Uruguay) AUF
- Founded: 1941
- Abolished: 1946; 80 years ago
- Region: Buenos Aires (Argentina); Montevideo (Uruguay)
- Teams: 2
- Related competitions: (Argentina) Primera División (Uruguay) Primera División
- Last champions: (Argentina) Boca Juniors (1946)
- Most championships: (Argentina) Boca Juniors (2 titles)

The Copa de Confraternidad Rioplatense Escobar-Gerona was an official football competition organized by both bodies, the Argentine and Uruguayan football association, being first held in 1941.

The Cup was played between the Primera División runners-up of Argentina and Uruguay, with a two match format, played in each country. This competition was played simultaneously with the Copa Aldao (also known as "Copa Río de la Plata", played by the champions of Argentine and Uruguayan associations).

The trophy was donated by Mr. Ramiro Jouan and named after Adrián Escobar and Héctor Gerona, presidents of the Argentine and Uruguayan associations respectively.

== Champions ==
- B: Boca Juniors won the match
- N: Nacional won the match

Ed.	Year	Champion	Score	Runner-up	Venue	City
1	1941	(no champion crowned) (Note: San Lorenzo won over Peñarol 2–1 the first leg, but as the second leg was not played the title was not officially proclaimed.)	2–1	–	Centenario	Montevideo
2	1942	(no champion crowned) (Note: Peñarol beat San Lorenzo 4–1 in the first leg, but as the second leg was not played the title was not officially proclaimed.)	4–1	–	Centenario	Montevideo
3	1945	(Argentina) Boca Juniors (1) (Note: The title was shared after both teams won one game each (Nacional 2–1 in Buenos Aires, and Boca 3–2 in Montevideo) with no third match played to define the series.)	1–2 (N)	–	San Lorenzo	Buenos Aires
3	1945	(Uruguay) Nacional (1)	3–2 (B)	–	Centenario	Montevideo
4	1946	(Argentina) Boca Juniors (2)	3–2	(Uruguay) Peñarol	Centenario	Montevideo
4	1946	(Argentina) Boca Juniors (2)	6–3	(Uruguay) Peñarol	San Lorenzo	Buenos Aires

== All-time top goalscorers ==
Rank	Name	Team	Goals
1	(Argentina) Pío Corcuera	(Argentina) Boca Juniors	5
2	(Uruguay) Ernesto Vidal	(Uruguay) Penarol	4
3	(Argentina) Jaime Sarlanga	(Argentina) Boca Juniors	3
4	(Uruguay) Obdulio Varela	(Uruguay) Penarol	2
4	(Uruguay) José María Medina	(Uruguay) Nacional	2
