= Rubén Omar Sánchez =

Argentinian footballer (born 1945)

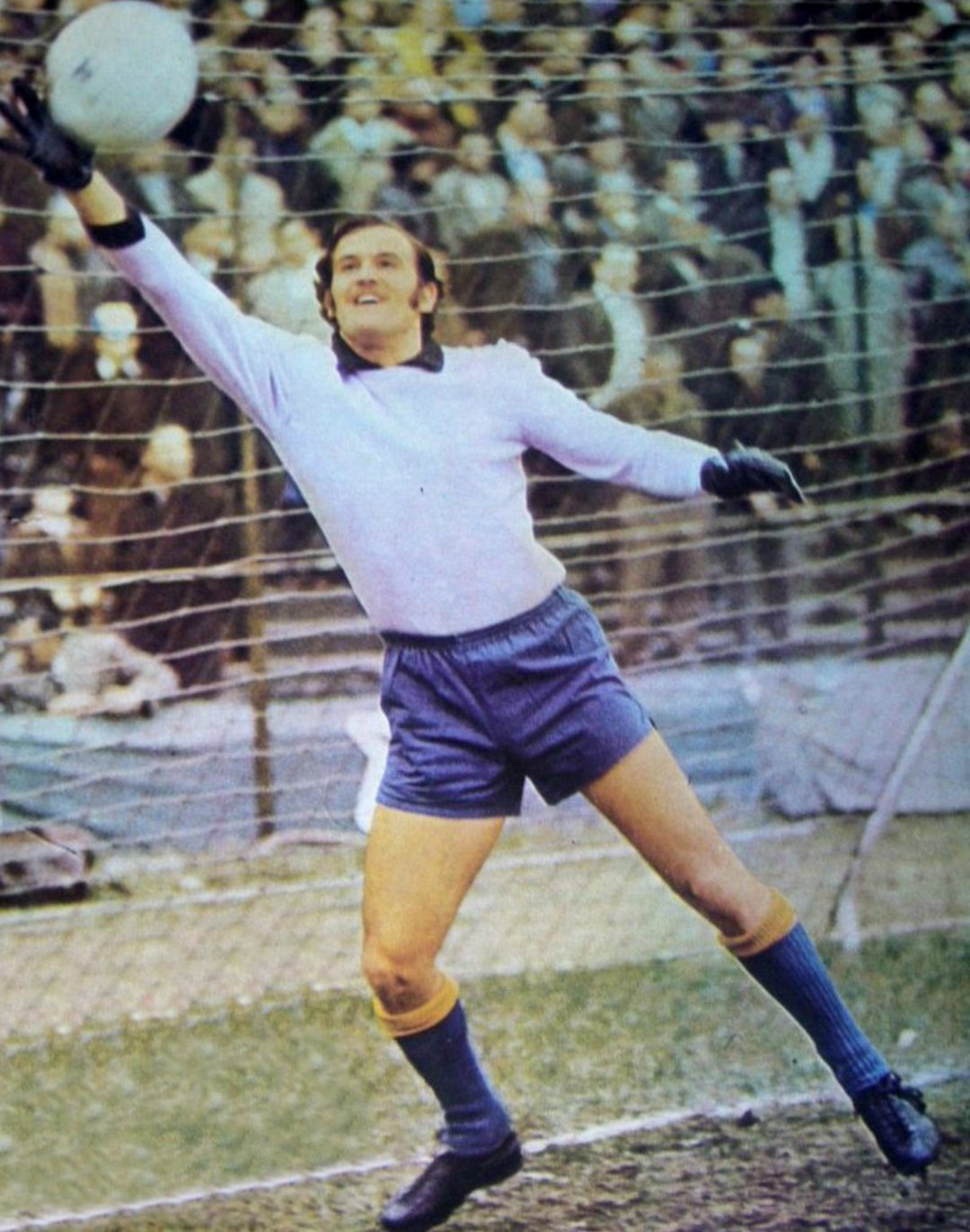

Personal information
- Full name: Rubén Omar Sánchez Compostella
- Date of birth: 29 July 1945 (age 81)
- Place of birth: Buenos Aires, Argentina
- Position: Goalkeeper

Youth career
- 1961–1963: Vélez Sarsfield
- 1963–1967: Boca Juniors

Senior career*
Years	Team	Apps	(Gls)
1968–1975	Boca Juniors	337	(0)
1975–1976	Atlante	42	
1977	Lanús	53	
1978–1980	Ferro Carril Oeste	120	
1981	Newell's Old Boys	28	
1981	Racing de Trelew	9	
1982	Gimnasia de La Plata	26	
1983	Chaco For Ever	4	
1983–1984	Terranova Gela	15	

International career
1968–1973	Argentina	25	(0)
- * Club domestic league appearances and goals

Rubén Omar Sánchez Compostella is an Argentine retired footballer. Nicknamed "Loco", he played as a goalkeeper for Boca Juniors where he would be part of the winning squad of three editions in the Argentine Primera División. He also played on an international level for Argentina between 1968 and 1973.

== Club career ==
Sánchez would begin his youth career by playing for Vélez Sarsfield from 1961 to 1963 when he would then play for the reserve team of Boca Juniors. He would make his official debut in the Argentine Primera Division on 21 August 1966 in the annual Argentine Superclásico against River Plate at the Estadio Monumental after being scouted by the club's manager Bernardo Gandulla which would end in a 2–0 victory. Later, he would participate in the 1966 Mohammed V Cup where the club would reach runners-up, losing to Real Madrid. Sánchez was also part of the winning squads for the 1969 Copa Argentina and the 1970 Argentine Primera División. During the 1971 Copa Libertadores, a violent brawl would break out between the players of Boca Juniors and Peruvian club Sporting Cristal. Along with his Peruvian teammate Julio Meléndez and Sporting Cristal goalkeeper Luis Rubiños, Sánchez wouldn't participate in the confrontation.

During a match between Boca Juniors and Rosario Central during the 1974 Argentine Primera División, Daniel Killer would score in the 63rd minute. Despite Boca Juniors ultimately winning the match 2–1, Sánchez would later block an attempted goal by José Reinaldi of Club Atlético Belgrano which would result in Boca Juniors winning 2–1 at the Estadio La Boutique. On 3 November 1974, Sánchez would participate in the centennial edition of the Superclásico would occur with the match ending in a 1–1 draw. His final match with the club would occur on 17 April 1975 in a match against River Plate once more which would end in a 2–1 defeat for Boca Juniors. In total, he would play in over 337 matches for the club with 219 of those being official.

Sánchez would then play abroad, going over to play in the 1975–76 Mexican Primera División for Atlante where the club would be relegated during the season. He would then return to Argentina to play for Lanús by Horacio Crosta but despite making numerous appearances for the club, could not prevent the club from being relegated from the Argentine Primera Division. He then played for Ferro Carril Oeste between 1978 and 1980 with his debut being in a 1–1 draw against Deportivo Italiano on 5 February 1978. For the 1978 season, he would initially play in the Segunda Division but would play in the Primera Division again following the club's promotion. He would briefly play for Newell's Old Boys during the 1981 Argentine Primera División but would later play for Racing de Trelew for the remainder of the year. He then played for Gimnasia de La Plata in the 1982 Argentine Segunda División and Chaco For Ever in the first half of the 1983 season. He would play abroad once more in his final season for Terranova Gelta, making 15 appearances for the club before retiring.

After his retirement from football as a player, he would serve as a manager of goalkeepers at Boca Juniors along with Roberto Delprete and Fabián Binzugna for four years.

== International career ==
Sánchez made his debut for his home country of Argentina on 5 June 1968 in a friendly against Uruguay during the 1968 Copa Lipton which would end in a 2–0 victory for the Argentines. Over the course of his career, he would play in 25 matches within Argentina from 1968 to 1973. He was also listed for the Brazil Independence Cup, but he wouldn't travel with the rest of the team.

== Personal life ==
Rubén was born on 29 July 1945 as the son of Juan José Sánchez who was also a former footballer.
