= Carlos Moya (footballer) =

Argentine footballer

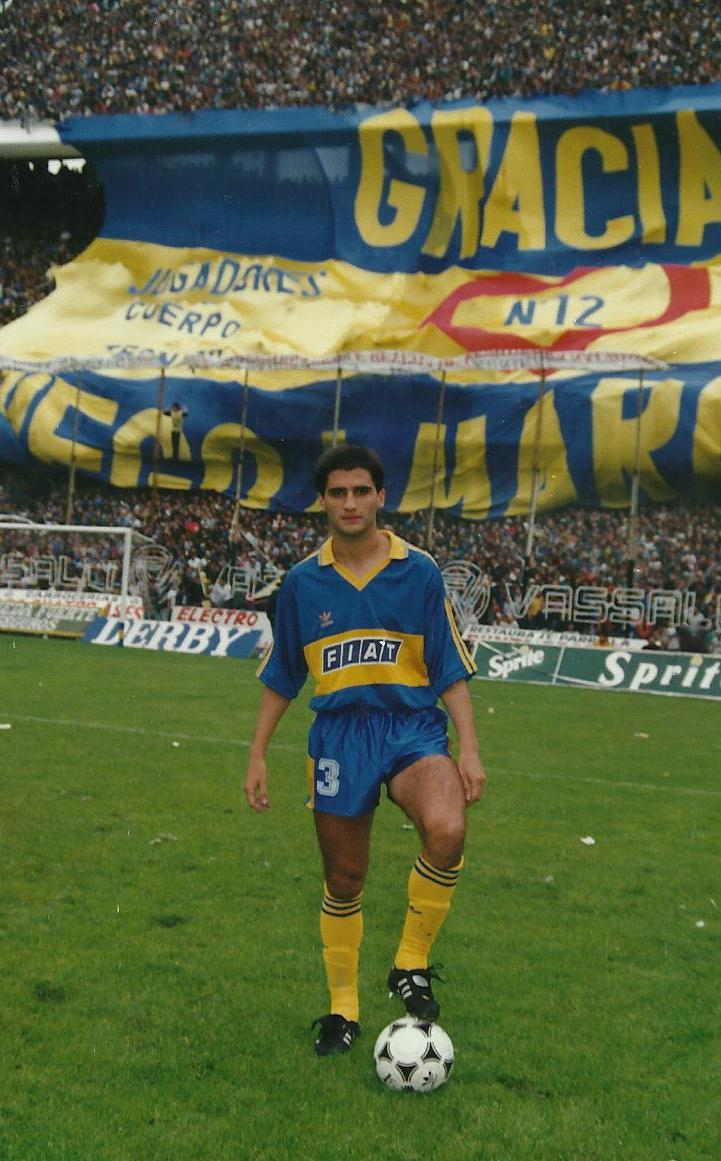

Personal information
- Full name: Carlos Daniel Moya Cimino
- Date of birth: 2 May 1969 (age 57)
- Place of birth: Argentina
- Position: Defender

Senior career*
Years	Team	Apps	(Gls)
1988–1989	Godoy Cruz		
1989–1994	Boca Juniors	89	(2)
1995–1996	Banfield	30	(0)
1996–1997	Hapoel Tayibe	10	(0)
1997–1998	Deportivo Español	2	(0)
1998–1999	Ferro Carril Oeste	18	(1)
1999–2002	Granada	75	(2)
2002–2003	UD Melilla	28	(0)
2003–2007	UD Maracena	67+	(3+)
- * Club domestic league appearances and goals

Carlos Moya (born 2 May 1969 in Argentina) is an Argentine former footballer.
