= Mierko Blazina =

Argentine footballer (born 1935)

Personal information
- Date of birth: 18 February 1925
- Place of birth: Italy
- Date of death: 28 February 2005 (aged 82)
- Place of death: Argentina
- Position: Goalkeeper

Senior career*
Years	Team	Apps	(Gls)
1943–1955	San Lorenzo	241	(0)
- San Telmo
- * Club domestic league appearances and goals

Mierko Blazina (18 February 1925 - 18 February 2005) was an Argentine footballer who last played as a goalkeeper for San Telmo.

== Early life ==
Blazina was born in Italy and moved to Argentina at the age of eight.

== Career ==
Blazina started his career with Argentine side San Lorenzo, helping the club win the league. He has the most appearances for a goalkeeper for the club.

== Style of play ==
Blazina was known for his "tranquility" and "cold-bloodedness".

== Personal life ==
Blazina was of Slovenian descent, his birth name was Mirko Blažina. His family escaped to Argentina when he was 8, due to fascist repression of Slovenian population.
