= Boca Juniors =

Association football club in Argentina

- Full name: Club Atlético Boca Juniors
- Nicknames: Xeneize (Genoese); Azul y Oro (Blue and Gold); El Único Grande (The only great); La mitad más uno (The Half plus One)
- Short name: Boca
- Founded: 3 April 1905; 121 years ago
- Ground: Estadio Alberto J. Armando
- Capacity: 57,200
- President: Juan Román Riquelme
- Head coach: Rodolfo Arruabarrena
- League: Primera División
- 2026: 1st of 30
- Website: bocajuniors.com.ar
Home colours	Away colours	Third colours

Club Atlético Boca Juniors (CABJ) (Spanish pronunciation: [kluβ aˈtletiko ˈβoka ˈʝunjoɾs]) is an Argentine professional sports club based in La Boca, a neighbourhood of Buenos Aires. The club is best known for its men's professional football team. The team has won 76 official titles, the most by any Argentine club. National titles won by Boca Juniors include 36 Primera División championships, and 17 domestic cups. Boca Juniors also owns an honorary title awarded by the Argentine Football Association for their successful tour of Europe in 1925. Since its debut in Primera División in 1913, Boca Juniors has always played in the top division.

Internationally, Boca Juniors has won 23 major titles, with 19 organised by CONMEBOL and the rest organised jointly by the Argentine and Uruguayan Associations. Consequently, Boca is ranked third in the world in terms of number of complete international titles, after Real Madrid (34) and Egyptian side Al Ahly (26). Boca Juniors' international achievements also include one Tie Cup, one Copa de Honor Cousenier, and two Copa Escobar-Gerona, organized jointly by AFA and AUF together. Their success usually has the Boca Juniors ranked among the IFFHS's Club World Ranking Top 25, which they have reached the top position in six times (mostly during the coaching tenure of Carlos Bianchi). Boca was named by the IFFHS as the top South American club of the first decade of the 21st century (2001–2010). It was designated by FIFA as the joint twelfth-best Club of the Century, in December 2000, occupying the same place as Liverpool of England.

Boca Juniors has a fierce rivalry with River Plate, and matches between them are known as the Superclásico. It is the most heated rivalry in Argentina and one of the biggest in the world, as the clubs are the two most popular in the country. Boca's home stadium is the Estadio Alberto J. Armando, better known colloquially as La Bombonera.

In addition to men's football, Boca Juniors has professional women's football and basketball teams. Other (amateur) activities held in the club are: bocce, boxing, chess, field hockey, futsal, artistic and rhythmic gymnastics, handball, martial arts (judo, karate, and taekwondo), swimming, volleyball, weightlifting, and wrestling. As of January 2023, Boca Juniors ranked first among the clubs with the most members in Argentina, with 315,879.

== History ==
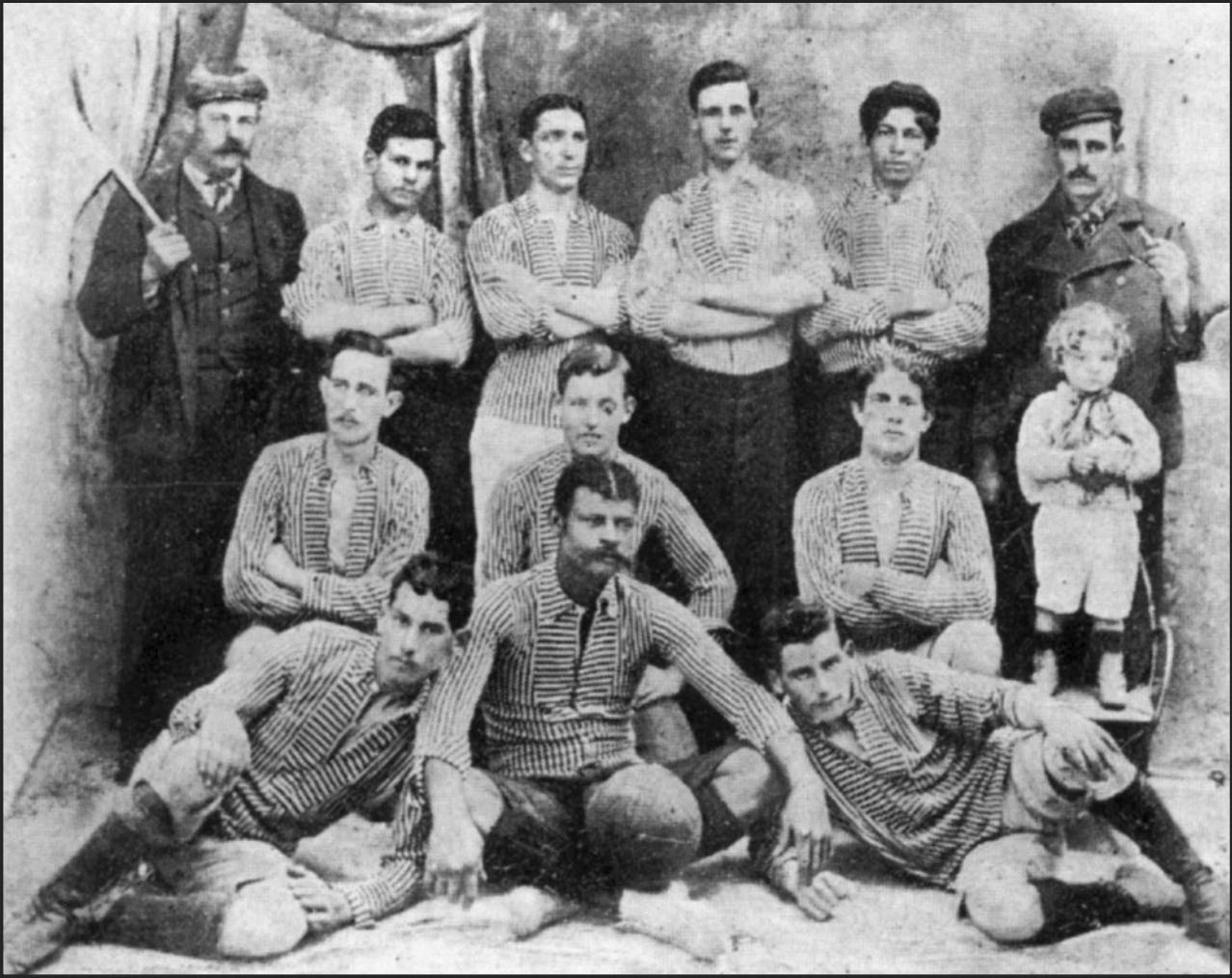
The first recorded photo of Boca Juniors taken in 1906, after winning the Liga Central championship

On 3 April 1905, a group of boys, who were the sons of Italian immigrants (more specifically from Genoa), met in order to find a club. The house where the meeting was arranged was Esteban Baglietto's and the other four people who attended were Alfredo Scarpatti, Santiago Sana and brothers Juan Farenga and Teodoro Farenga . Other important founding members include Arturo Penney, Marcelino Vergara, Luis Cerezo, Adolfo Taggio, Giovanelli, Donato Abbatángelo, and Bertolini. Before the club was officially established in the La Boca district of Buenos Aires in April 1905, Irish immigrant from Cashel, County Tipperary, Patrick McCarthy (footballer, born 1871), taught the fundamentals and rules of the game to young local youths, including future club founders like Esteban Baglietto, so when these boys founded the club they asked the Irishman to be its first manager. Like their Buenos Aires rivals, Vélez Sarsfield, Boca hence trace their roots to an Irish connection from an era when the Irish Argentines community was at its zenith.

In 1913, Boca was promoted to Primera División after some previous failed attempts. This was possible when the Argentine Association decided to increase the number of teams in the league from 6 to 15.

In 1925, Boca made its first trip to Europe to play in Spain, Germany and France. The squad played a total of 19 games, winning 15 of them. For that reason Boca was declared "Campeón de Honor" (Champion of Honour) by the Association.

During successive years, Boca consolidated as one of the most popular teams of Argentina, with a huge number of fans not only in the country but worldwide.

== Kit and badge ==
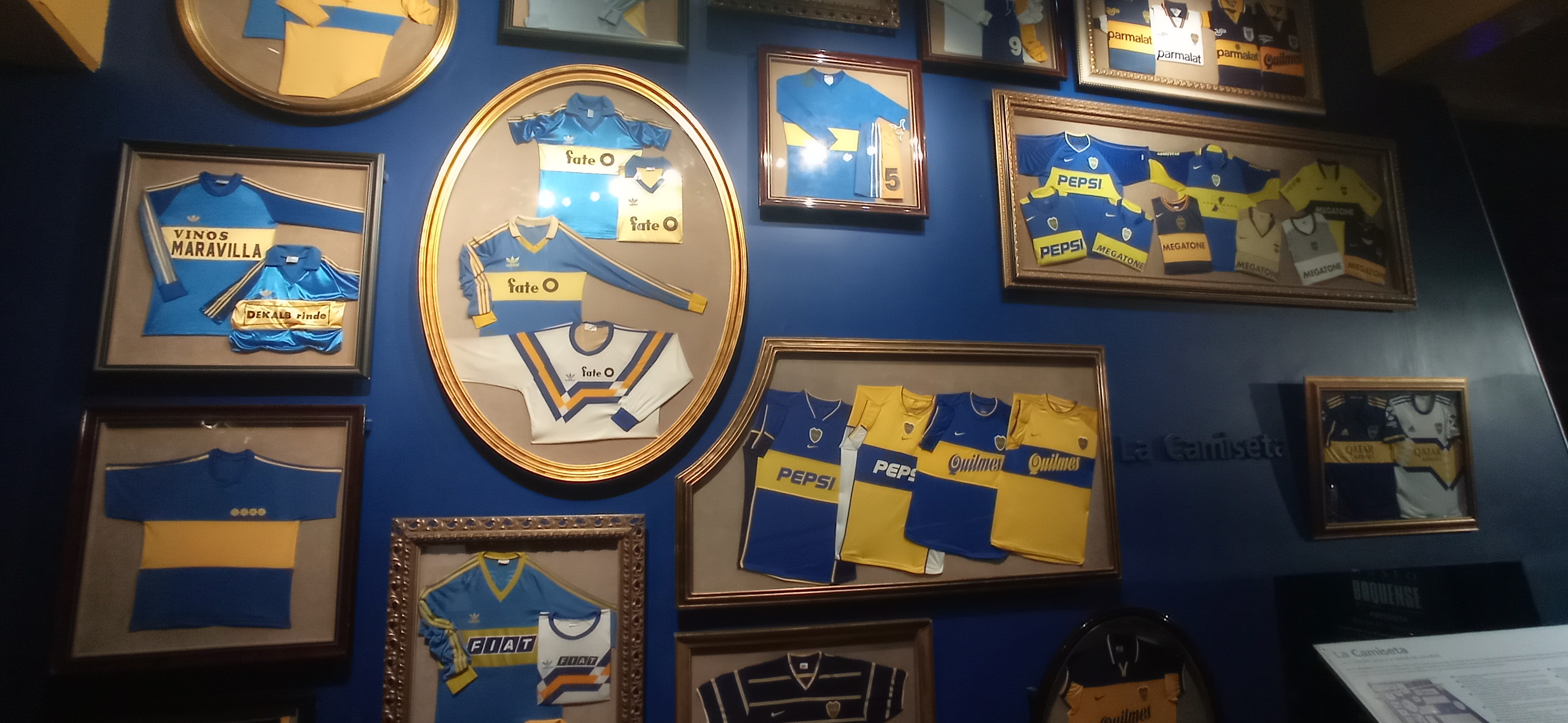
Some jerseys worn in the 1990s–2000s also in exhibition

According to the club's official site, the original jersey colour was a white shirt with thin black vertical stripes, being then replaced by a light blue shirt and then another striped jersey before adopting the definitive blue and gold. Nevertheless, another version states that Boca Juniors' first jersey was pink, although it has been questioned by some journalists and historians who state that Boca, most probably, never wore a pink jersey, by pointing out the lack of any solid evidence and how this version stems from, and is only supported on, flawed testimonies.

According to legend, when Boca played Nottingham de Almagro in 1906, both teams wore such similar shirts that the match was played to decide which team would get to keep it. Boca lost, and decided to adopt the colors of the flag of the first boat to sail into the port at La Boca. This proved to be a Swedish ship, therefore the yellow and blue of the Swedish flag were adopted as the new team colours. Reportedly, it was the dockworker Juan Bricchetto who saw the ship, which was named Drottning Sophia. The first version had a yellow diagonal band, which was later changed to a horizontal stripe.

Through Boca Juniors history, the club has worn some alternate "rare" models, such as the AC Milan shirt in a match versus Universidad de Chile (whose uniform was also blue) in the 1963 Copa Libertadores. When Nike became official kit provider in 1996, the first model by the company introduced two thin white stripes surrounding the gold band, causing some controversy. The brand also introduced a silver jersey designed exclusively for the 1998 Copa Mercosur. For the 100th anniversary of the club, Nike launched commemorative editions of several models worn by the club since its foundation, including a version of the 1907 shirt with the diagonal sash, which was worn in two matches during the 2005 Torneo de Verano (Summer Championship). Other models were a black and white striped jersey (similar to Juventus FC) and a purple model, worn in the 2012 and 2013 "Torneos de Verano", respectively.

Nevertheless, no shirt caused more controversy than the pink model released as the away jersey for the 2013–14 season, which was widely rejected by the fans. Because of that, the introduction of this model (to be initially worn v. Rosario Central) was delayed until the last fixture when Boca played Gimnasia y Esgrima (LP). As a replacement for the pink model, Nike designed a fluorescent yellow shirt launched that same season.

In 2016, the club wore a black jersey for the first time in its history, originally launched as the third kit. Although the President of the club, Daniel Angelici, had stated that the black kit would never be worn, the kit debuted in a match v. Tigre, only four days after the announcement.

Adidas is the club's current kit supplier since January 2020. The agreement (which will remain in force until 2029) was signed for US $10,069,000 plus 40% in royalties per year for the club.

=== Kit evolution ===
Uniforms worn by the team through its history:

1905 (Note: Some sources state the first shirt was pink, as so did the club itself, although further revisions established the striped black and white as the first shirt adopted by the club. Nike released some versions based on this model, first in 2005 (although only for sale at stores) and then in 2012, although this model was only worn during the Torneo de Verano.)	1905–06	1906–07 (Note: A similar model was used as the alternate kit in the 2006–07 season, 100 years after it was worn by the first time.)	1907–12 (Note: According to photographic document of those times, the diagonal sash was displayed in both ways, from left to right and vice versa.)	1913–present

=== Kit suppliers and shirt sponsors ===
Period	Kit Manufacturer	Shirt Sponsors
1980–83	Adidas	–
1983	Adidas	Vinos Maravilla
1984	Adidas	Dekalb
1985–89	Adidas	Fate
1989–92	Adidas	Fiat
1992–93	Adidas	Parmalat
1993–95	Olan	Parmalat
1996	Olan	Quilmes
1996	Topper (Note: After Olan was taken over by Topper, the brand (then owned by Alpargatas) was the kit suppier just for one month, until the contract with Nike entered into force in September 1996.)	Quilmes
1996–01	Nike	Quilmes
2001–03	Nike	Pepsi
2003–04	Nike	Pepsi & Goodyear
2004–05	Nike	Red Megatone & Goodyear
2006	Nike	Megatone & Goodyear
2007–09	Nike	Megatone & UNICEF
2009–11	Nike	LG & Total
2012–14	Nike	BBVA & Total
2014–16	Nike	BBVA & Citroën
2016–18	Nike	BBVA & Huawei
2018–19	Nike	Qatar Airways & Axion Energy
2020–21	Adidas	Qatar Airways & Axion Energy
2021–22	Adidas	Qatar Airways
2022–23	Adidas	None
2023–	Adidas	Betsson & DirecTV

=== Badge ===
The club has had five different designs for its badge during its history, although its outline has remained unchanged through most of its history.

The first known emblem dates from 1911, appearing on the club's letterhead papers. In October 1932, the club stated that one star would be added to the badge for each Primera División title won. Nevertheless, the stars would not appear until 1943, on a Report and Balance Sheet.

A version with laurel leaves appeared in a magazine in 1955 to celebrate the 50th anniversary of the club, although the club never used it officially.

The emblem with the stars was announced in 1932, but it has regularly appeared on Boca Juniors uniforms since 1993.

In 1996, the Ronald Shakespear Studio introduced a new badge (with the horizontal band suppressed) as part of a visual identity for the club. The new Boca Juniors image also featured new typography and style.

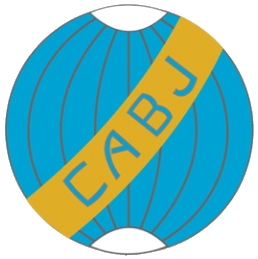
1911–14

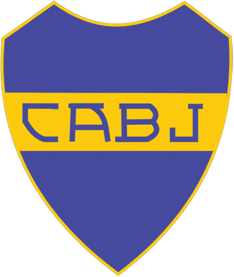
1915–32

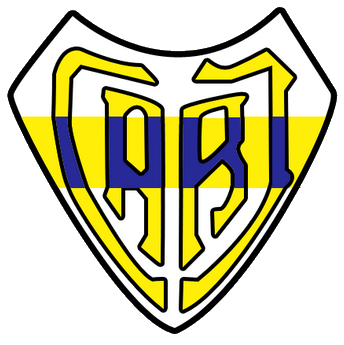
1925–26 (Note: Used only in report and balance sheets and member cards. It is not listed as official on club's website.)

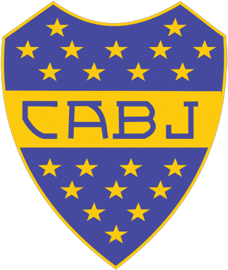
1932–96 (Note: In 1932, the club stated that the badge should include one star per title won to date. Nevertheless, the stars were not included until 1943.)

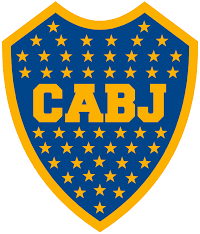
1996–present

== Stadium ==
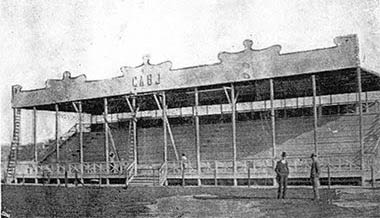
Official grandstand of Estadio Ministro Brin y Senguel, where Boca Juniors played from 1916 to 1924

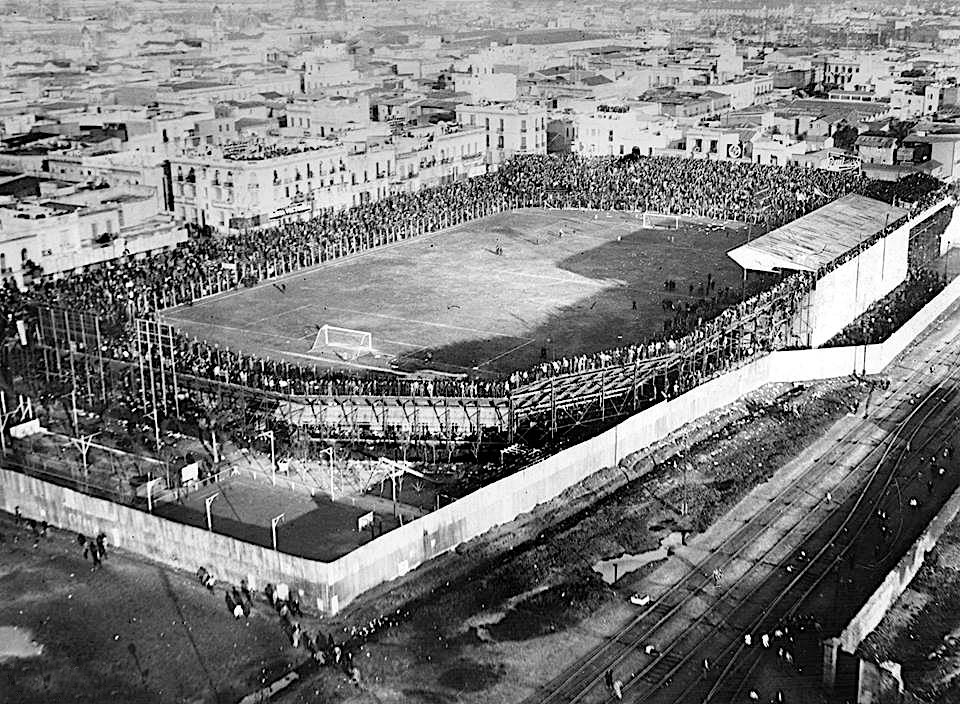
The Boca Juniors stadium in Brandsen and Del Crucero, inaugurated in 1924. It was later demolished to build La Bombonera, in the same place

Boca Juniors used several locations before settling on their current ground on Brandsen. Club's first ground was in Dársena Sur of the old Buenos Aires port (currently Puerto Madero) but it was vacated in 1907 as it failed to meet the minimum league requirements. Boca Juniors then used three grounds in the Isla Demarchi area between 1908 and 1912. In the first year in the Primera Division (1913) the club hadn't an own stadium and played the home games in the pitches of the other teams, likely in Estudiantes de Buenos Aires in Palermo (on Figueroa Alcorta y Dorrego), but also in Avellaneda (first official derby against the River). Between 1914 and 1915, the club moved away from La Boca for the second time in its history (beyond the 1913), moving to Wilde in the Avellaneda Partido of the Greater Buenos Aires but a relatively poor season and poor attendances in 1915 forced the club to move back to La Boca.

On 25 May 1916, Boca Juniors opened its new stadium at the intersection of Ministro Brin and Senguel streets, playing there until 1924 when the club moved to Brandsen and Del Crucero (Del Valle Iberlucea nowadays) streets, to build a new stadium there, which lasted until 1938 when the club decided to build a totally new venue, made of concrete grandstand instead of wood.

Building of Boca Juniors' current stadium began in 1938, under the supervision of Engineer José L. Delpini. Boca played its home matches in Ferro Carril Oeste's Estadio Ricardo Etcheverry in Caballito until it was completed on 25 May 1940. A third level was added in 1953, originating then its nickname La Bombonera ('The Chocolate Box'). The stand opposite the Casa Amarilla railway platforms remained mostly undeveloped until 1996, when it was upgraded with new balconies and quite expensive VIP boxes. Three sides of the Bombonera are thus made up of traditional sloping stadium stands, but the fourth side was built vertically, with several seating areas stacked one on top of the other, the only way that makes it stand into the club premises.

La Bombonera is known for vibrating when Boca fans (La 12) jump in rhythm; in particular, the unique vertical side will sway slightly, leading to the phrase, "La Bombonera no tiembla. Late" (The Bombonera does not tremble. It beats)

La Bombonera currently has a capacity of around 54,000. The club's popularity make tickets hard to come by, especially for the Superclásico game against River Plate. There are further improvements planned for the stadium, including measures to ease crowd congestion, use of new technology and improved corporate facilities.

Apart from the venues listed, Boca Juniors also played its home games at Estudiantes de Buenos Aires's stadium (in 1913, then located on Figueroa Alcorta Avenue) and Ferro Carril Oeste stadium (1938–40, while La Bombonera was under construction).

In 2023 while running for the president's role of the club, Jorge Reale famously unveiled plans and designs of a new state-of-the-art roofed stadium that would house 112,000 spectators, 444 VIP boxes and 4,000 parking spaces. The plan was ceased in the following year after the incumbent president, Juan Roman Riquelme, a popular figure among fans due to his footballing heroics as a player, won the presidential election.

List of Boca Juniors venues
Field / Venue	District	Period
Dársena Sud (Note: Located on Pedro de Mendoza, Colorado (today A. Caffarena), Sengüel (B. Pérez Galdós) and Gaboto, where the "Usina del Arte" is placed nowadays.)	La Boca	1905–07
Isla Demarchi	Puerto Madero	1908–12
Wilde (Note: Located behind "Carboneras Wilson".)	Wilde	1914–15
Ministro Brin y Senguel	La Boca	1916–24
Brandsen y Del Crucero (Note: Del Crucero was later renamed "Del Valle Iberlucea".)	La Boca	1924–38
La Bombonera (Note: Official name: "Alberto J. Armando".)	La Boca	1940–present

== Supporters ==
=== Fanbase ===
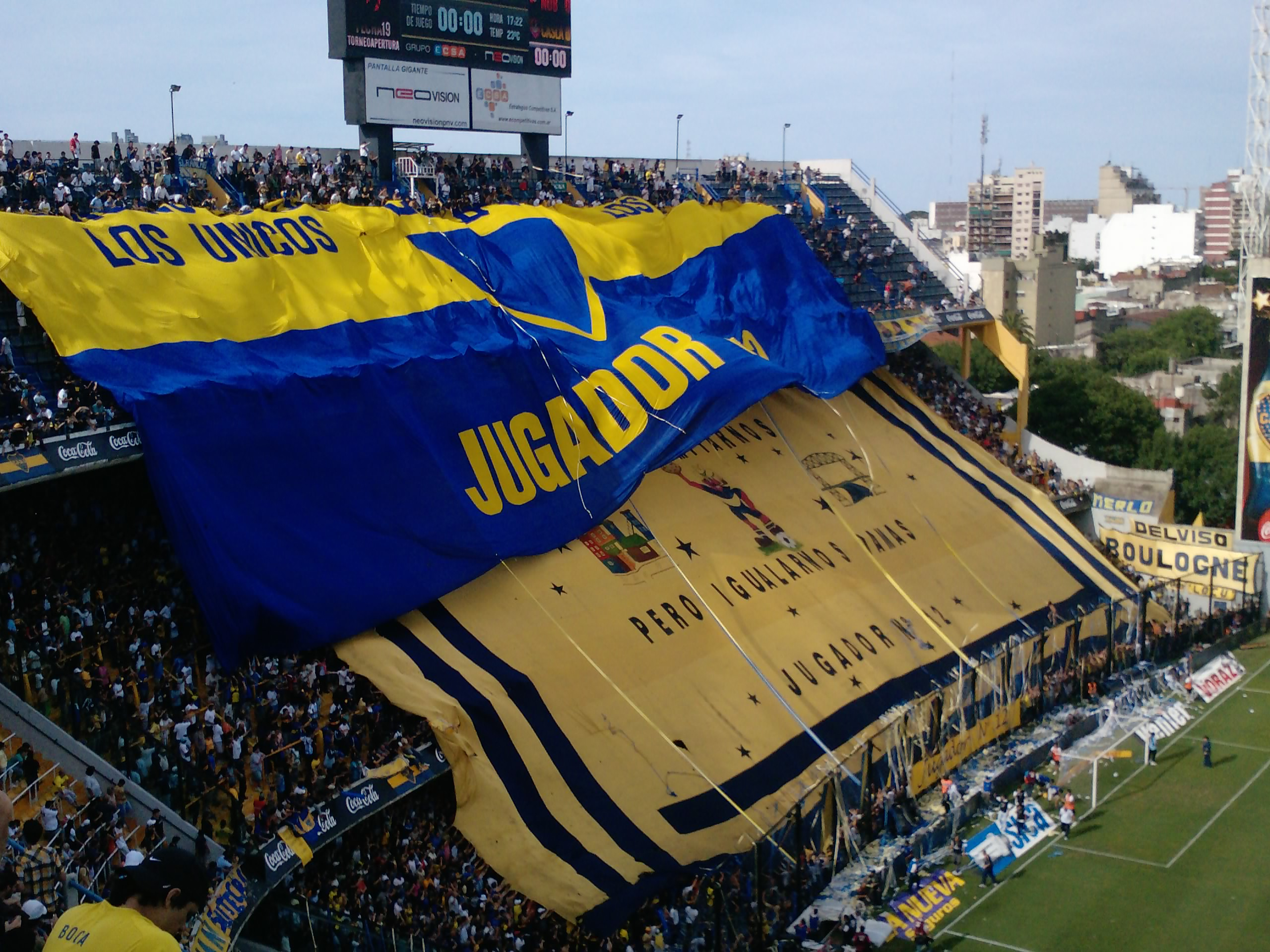
Boca Juniors' supporters displaying their flags at La Bombonera (north side), 2009

Boca Juniors is traditionally regarded as the club of Argentina's working class, in contrast with the supposedly more upper-class base of cross-town arch rival River Plate who moved to the more affluent district of Núñez in the north of the city in 1923.

Boca Juniors claims to be the club of "half plus one" (la mitad más uno) of Argentina's population. A 2006 survey placed its following at 40%, still the largest share. Nevertheless, they have the highest number of fans, as judged by percentage in their country.

In 1975, a film (La Raulito) was made about the life of Mary Esher Duffau, known as La Raulito, a well-known Boca Juniors fan. She died at the age of 74 on 30 April 2008, the same day Boca Juniors played a Copa Libertadores match against Brazilian club, Cruzeiro Esporte Clube with the players and fans observing a minute's silence in her memory.

=== Club membership ===
Boca Juniors usually play their league games in front of capacity crowds. The club's popularity make tickets hard to come by, especially for the Superclásico game against River Plate.

As of 2026, Boca has a 282,644 member base, which ranks second in Argentina behind River Plate and fourth worldwide.

=== Nicknames ===
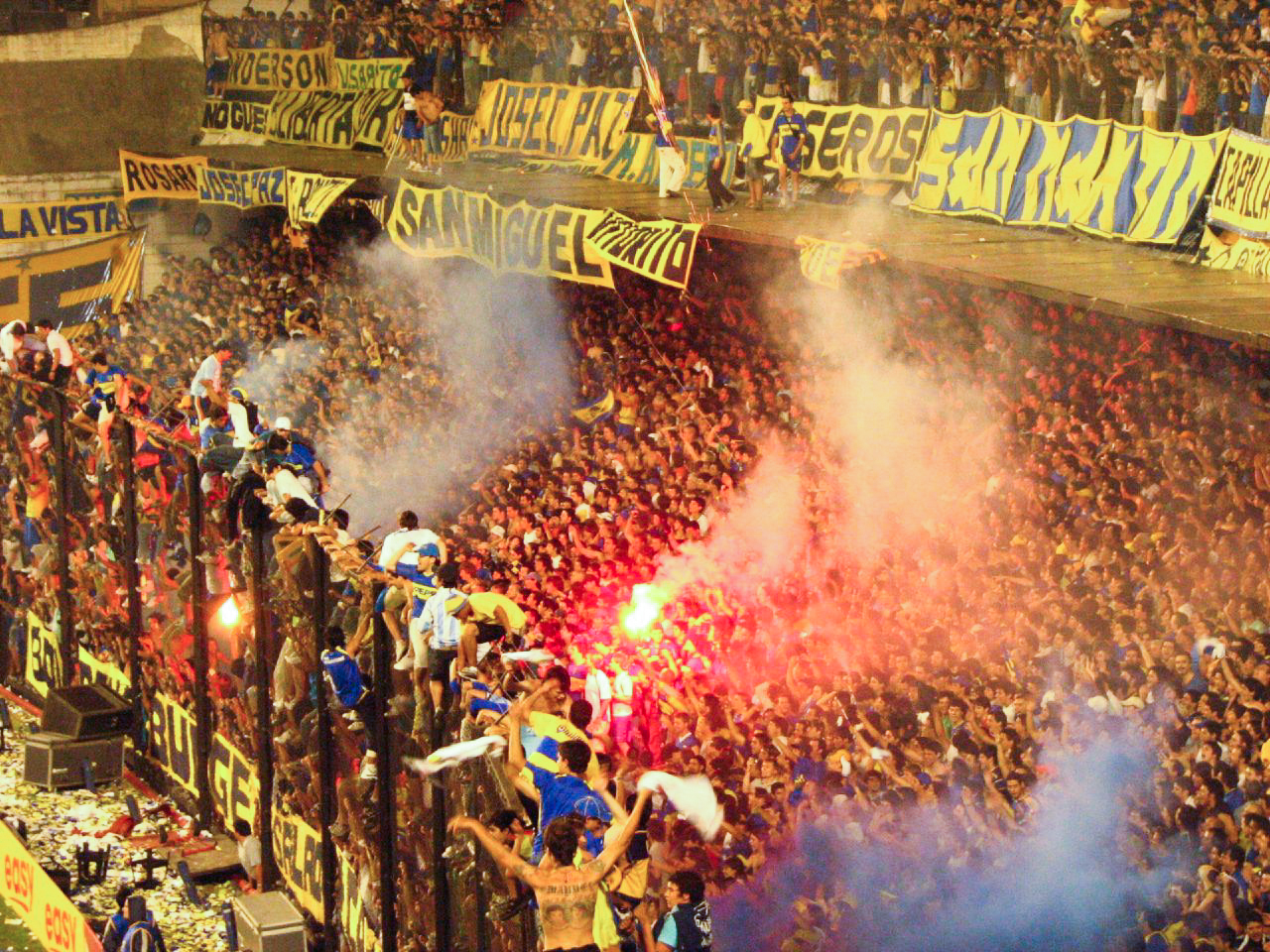
Boca Juniors supporters during a night Copa Libertadores game v. Pumas

Boca fans are known as Los Xeneizes (the Genoese) after the Genoese immigrants who founded the team and lived in La Boca in the early 20th century.

Many rival fans in Argentina refer to the Boca Juniors' fans as Los Bosteros (the manure handlers), originating from the horse manure used in the brick factory which occupied the ground where La Bombonera stands. Originally an insult used by rivals, Boca fans are now proud of it.

Reflecting the team's colors, Boca's shirt is also called la azul y oro (the blue and gold).

==== La Doce ====
There is also a society which dedicates all of its activities to supporting the team known as la número 12 or la doce (player number doce or 12, meaning "the 12th player").

The naming of "La 12" (the twelfth player), by which Boca Juniors' fans became known, dates back to the year 1925, during the European tour they made that year. At that time, the team was accompanied by a Boca fan called Victoriano Caffarena, who belonged to a wealthy family and funded part of the tour. Caffarena was sent as a correspondent for the newspaper El Telégrafo, but he fulfilled multiple roles such as equipment manager, water boy, masseur, and even coach. That helped him to establish a strong relationship with the players, so they named him "player number 12". When they returned to Argentina, Caffarena was as well known as the players themselves.

Nowadays, this nickname is used primarily to name their group of supporters, known as "La 12".

==== Ultras & illegal activities ====
Some Boca fans run ultra organizations similar to other "barra brava" gangs associated with football clubs in Argentina but in the name of "La doce".

Their illegal activities include assault, drug sales and trafficking, extortion, and murder.

They finance its activities by selling parking, reselling club tickets, and extorting commissions from the sale of players, plus the club for transportation to domestic and international events as well as their means of financing their activities.

If their demands are not met, they threaten violence at home matches or to take down club officials.

=== International ===
Peñas (fan clubs) exist in a number of Argentine cities and abroad in countries such as Russia, Ukraine, Spain, Israel and Japan.

Boca Juniors are particularly popular in Japan, because of the club's success in the early 2000s at the Intercontinental Cup held in Japan.

Elsewhere internationally, fans are drawn to Boca by the club's international titles and by the success of Boca players who went on to play in European football such as Hugo Ibarra, Rodolfo Arruabarrena, Diego Cagna, Enzo Ferrero, Roberto Abbondanzieri, Nicolás Burdisso, Fernando Gago, Diego Maradona, Claudio Caniggia, Gabriel Batistuta, Juan Román Riquelme and Carlos Tevez.

Boca has fans throughout Latin America and also in parts of the United States where there has been Latin immigration. In July 2007, after the club had toured pre-season, it was reported that the club was considering the possibility of creating a Boca Juniors USA team to compete in Major League Soccer.

== Rivalries ==
Boca Juniors maintains a long-standing rivalry with River Plate, known as the Superclásico. It is widely regarded as one of the most intense and significant rivalries in world & association football, being within Argentina and internationally.

The Superclásico is mostly noted for the fan passion, simultaneous jumping of the fans and fan songs (often based on popular Argentine rock band tunes) against their rivals, games have occasionally been marred by riots between the hardest supporters of both sides or against the police.

Out of their 338 previous meetings, Boca have won 126, River have won 107 and there have been 105 draws. Boca Juniors and River Plate have played 259 official games all time against each other, with Boca winning 91, River winning 85 and 83 draws.

The intensity of the rivalry has not stopped players from playing for both clubs, most notably José Manuel Moreno, Hugo Orlando Gatti, Alberto Tarantini, Oscar Ruggeri, Julio Olarticoechea, Carlos Tapia, Gabriel Batistuta and Claudio Caniggia.

The English newspaper The Observer put the Superclásico (played at La Bombonera) at the top of their list of "50 sporting things you must do before you die".

== Players ==
=== Current squad ===
As of 14 September 2026 Note: Flags indicate national team as defined under FIFA eligibility rules; some limited exceptions apply. Players may hold more than one non-FIFA nationality.

No.	Pos.	Nation	Player
1	GK	COL	Álvaro Montero
2	DF	ARG	Lautaro Di Lollo
3	DF	ARG	Lautaro Blanco
4	DF	ARG	Nicolás Figal
5	MF	ARG	Leandro Paredes (captain)
6	MF	ARG	Rodrigo Battaglia
7	MF	CHI	Carlos Palacios
8	MF	ARG	Tomás Belmonte
9	FW	ARG	Milton Giménez
10	MF	ARG	Tomás Aranda
11	FW	PAR	Ángel Romero
12	GK	ARG	Leandro Brey
13	GK	ARG	Javier García
15	MF	CHI	Williams Alarcón
16	FW	URU	Miguel Merentiel

No.	Pos.	Nation	Player
17	DF	URU	Leandro Lozano
18	MF	ARG	Milton Delgado
19	FW	ARG	Leonel Flores
20	MF	ARG	Alan Velasco
22	MF	COL	Sebastián Villa
23	MF	ARG	Camilo Rey Domenech
24	DF	ARG	Dylan Gorosito
25	MF	ARG	Santiago Ascacíbar
26	DF	ARG	Marco Pellegrino
27	MF	ARG	Malcom Braida
28	FW	PAR	Adam Bareiro
30	FW	ECU	Enner Valencia
32	DF	ARG	Ayrton Costa
42	DF	ARG	Facundo Herrera

=== Other players under contract ===
Note: Flags indicate national team as defined under FIFA eligibility rules; some limited exceptions apply. Players may hold more than one non-FIFA nationality.

No.	Pos.	Nation	Player
—	GK	ARG	Agustín Marchesín
—	DF	ARG	Agustín Heredia

No.	Pos.	Nation	Player
—	DF	ARG	Walter Molas
—	MF	ARG	Juan Ramírez

=== Reserve squad ===
Note: Flags indicate national team as defined under FIFA eligibility rules; some limited exceptions apply. Players may hold more than one non-FIFA nationality.

No.	Pos.	Nation	Player
31	MF	ARG	Tomás Márquez
33	FW	ARG	Lautaro Mendieta
34	MF	ARG	Juan Cruz Payal
35	MF	COL	Franco Pérez
39	MF	ARG	Matías Calegari
44	FW	ARG	Rodrigo Bacidalupe
45	FW	ARG	Miguel Ventos
46	DF	ARG	Matías Satas

No.	Pos.	Nation	Player
47	GK	ARG	Fernando Rodríguez
48	DF	ARG	Baltazar Blum
49	FW	ARG	Joaquín Piñeyro
50	MF	ARG	Dante González
51	DF	PAR	Gadiel Paoli
52	FW	ARG	Juan Pussetto
53	MF	ARG	Joaquín Ruiz
54	FW	ARG	Kevin Ferreira

=== Out on loan ===
Note: Flags indicate national team as defined under FIFA eligibility rules; some limited exceptions apply. Players may hold more than one non-FIFA nationality.

No.	Pos.	Nation	Player
—	GK	ARG	Sebastián Díaz Robles (at San Martín-SJ until 31 December 2026)
—	GK	ARG	Ramiro García (at Argentino-Q until 31 December 2026)
—	GK	ARG	Agustín Lastra (at Estudiantes-RC until 31 December 2026)
—	DF	ARG	Gabriel Aranda (at Racing-C until 31 December 2026)
—	DF	ARG	Juan Barinaga (at Racing de Avellaneda until 30 June 2027)
—	DF	ARG	Balthazar Bernardi (at Estudiantes until 31 December 2026)
—	DF	SUI	Lucas Blondel (at Huracán until 31 December 2026)
—	DF	ARG	Nahuel Génez (at Patronato until 31 December 2026)
—	DF	ARG	Renzo Giampaoli (at Gimnasia-LP until 31 December 2026)
—	DF	ARG	Mateo Mendía (at Platense until 31 December 2026)
—	DF	ARG	Pedro Velurtas (at Almirante Brown until 31 December 2026)
—	DF	ARG	Santiago Zampieri (at M.C. Torque until 30 June 2027)
—	MF	ARG	Julián Ceballos (at Gimnasia-M until 31 December 2026)
—	MF	CHI	Brandon Cortés (at Patronato until 31 December 2026)
—	MF	ARG	Santiago Dalmasso (at Platense until 31 December 2026)
—	MF	ARG	Tomás Díaz (at Los Andes until 31 December 2026)
—	MF	ARG	Gonzalo Maroni (at Barracas Central until 31 December 2026)

No.	Pos.	Nation	Player
—	MF	ARG	Agustín Martegani (at Independiente Medellín until 30 June 2027)
—	MF	ARG	Rodrigo Montes (at Deportivo Rincón until 31 December 2026)
—	MF	ARG	Simón Rivero (at Tigre until 31 December 2026)
—	MF	ARG	Jabes Saralegui (at Tigre until 31 December 2026)
—	MF	ARG	Gabriel Vega (at Nueva Chicago until 31 December 2026)
—	FW	ARG	Brian Aguirre (at Estudiantes-LP until 31 December 2026)
—	FW	ARG	Federico Aguirre (at Camioneros until 31 December 2026)
—	FW	ARM	Norberto Briasco (at Barracas Central until 31 December 2026)
—	FW	ARG	Lucas Brochero (at San Miguel until December 2026)
—	FW	ARG	Lucas Janson (at Gimnasia-LP until 30 June 2027)
—	FW	ARG	Gonzalo Morales (at Barracas Central until 31 December 2026)
—	FW	ARG	Agustín Obando (at Atlético de Rafaela until 31 December 2026)
—	FW	URU	Ignacio Rodríguez (at Atlanta until 31 December 2026)
—	FW	ARG	Valentino Simoni (at Gimnasia-M until 31 December 2026)
—	FW	ARG	Maximiliano Zalazar (at Gimnasia-LP until 31 December 2026)
—	FW	ARG	Iker Zufiaurre (at Albion until 30 June 2027)
—	FW	ARG	Gonzalo Gelini (at Peñarol until 30 June 2027)

=== Reserves and Academy ===
For the reserve and academy squads, see Boca Juniors Reserves and Academy

=== Records ===
==== Most goals ====
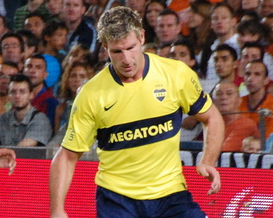
Martín Palermo, Boca Juniors' all-time top goalscorer

No.	Player	Pos.	Tenure	Goals
1	(Argentina) Martín Palermo	FW	1997–01, 2004–11	236
2	(Argentina) Roberto Cherro	FW	1926–38	223
3	(Argentina) Francisco Varallo	FW	1931–39	194
4	(Argentina) Domingo Tarasconi	FW	1922–32	192
5	(Argentina) Jaime Sarlanga	FW	1940–48	129
6	(Argentina) Mario Boyé	FW	1941–49, 1955	123
7	(Paraguay) Delfín Benítez Cáceres	FW	1932–38	114
8	(Argentina) Pío Corcuera	FW	1941–48	97
9	(Argentina) Pedro Calomino	FW	1911–13, 1915–24	96
10	(Argentina) Carlos Tevez	FW	2001–04, 2015–16, 2018–21	94

Last updated on: 31 July 2023 – Los 10 máximos goleadores at historiadeboca.com.ar

==== Most appearances ====
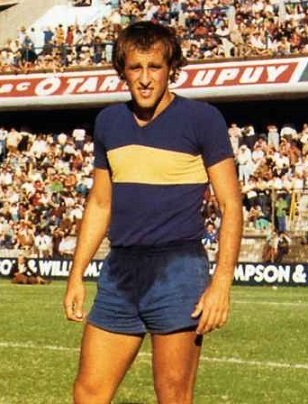
Roberto Mouzo, Boca Juniors' most capped player

No	Player	Position	Tenure	App.
1	(Argentina) Roberto Mouzo	DF	1971–84	426
2	(Argentina) Hugo Gatti	GK	1976–88	417
3	(Argentina) Silvio Marzolini	DF	1960–72	408
4	(Argentina) Martín Palermo	FW	1997–2001, 2004–11	404
5	(Colombia) Carlos Navarro Montoya	GK	1988–96	400
6	(Argentina) Juan Román Riquelme	MF	1996–2002, 2007–14	388
7	(Argentina) Antonio Rattín	MF	1956–70	382
8	(Argentina) Ernesto Lazzatti	MF	1934–47	379
9	(Argentina) Rubén Suñé	MF	1967–72, 1976–80	377
10	(Argentina) Natalio Pescia	MF	1942–56	365

Last updated on: 31 July 2023 – Top 10 most appearances of all time at historiadeboca.com.ar

=== Notable players ===
This section lists players who have appeared in least 100 matches or scored at least 35 goals for the club.

==== 1905–1930s ====
- (Argentina) Máximo Pieralini (1909–18)
- (Argentina) Francisco Taggino (1910–15)
- (Argentina) Pedro Calomino (1911–13; 1915–24)
- (Argentina) Enrique Bertolini (1912–23)
- (Argentina) Alfredo Elli (1916–28)
- (Argentina) Alfredo Garasini (1916–28)
- (Argentina) Américo Tesoriere (1916–27)
- (Argentina) Pablo Bozzo (1918–23)
- (Argentina) Mario Busso (1918–27)
- (Argentina) Antonio Cerroti (1920–29)
- (Argentina) Ramón Muttis (1923–32)
- (Argentina) Ludovico Bidoglio (1922–31)
- (Argentina) Ángel Médici (1922–31)
- (Argentina) Domingo Tarasconi (1922–32)
- (Argentina) Roberto Cherro (1926–35)
- (Argentina) Mario Evaristo (1926–31)
- (Argentina) Estaban Kuko (1926–33)
- (Argentina) Gerardo Moreyras (1927–33)
- (Argentina) Donato Penella (1928–32)
- (Argentina) Antonio Alberino (1929–34)
- (Spain) Pedro Arico Suárez (1929–42)

==== 1930s–1970s ====
- (Argentina) Francisco Varallo (1931–39)
- (Paraguay) Delfín Benítez Cáceres (1932–38)
- (Argentina) Juan Yustrich (1932–37)
- (Argentina) José Manuel Marante (1934–38; 1940–50)
- (Argentina) Ernesto Lazzatti (1934–47)
- (Argentina) Víctor Valussi (1935–36; 1938–45)
- (Argentina) Juan Alberto Estrada (1938–43)
- (Argentina) Claudio Vacca (1938–40; 1942–50)
- (Argentina) Segundo Gregorio Ibáñez (1939–42)
- (Argentina) Jaime Sarlanga (1940–48)
- (Argentina) Mario Boyé (1941–49; 1955)
- (Argentina) Pío Corcuera (1941–48)
- (Argentina) Carlos Sosa (1941–51)
- (Argentina) Natalio Pescia (1942–56)
- (Uruguay) Severino Varela (1943–45)
- (Argentina) Obdulio Diano (1944–53)
- (Argentina) Rodolfo Dezorzi (1945–48)
- (Argentina) Héctor Raúl Otero (1948–56)
- (Argentina) Marcos Busico (1949–54)
- (Argentina) Herminio Antonio González (1949–54; 1956–59)
- (Argentina) Juan Carlos Colman (1950–57)
- (Argentina) José Borello (1951–58)
- (Argentina) Federico Roberto Edwards (1951–59)
- (Argentina) Juan Francisco Lombardo (1952–60)
- (Argentina) Eliseo Mouriño (1953–60)
- (Argentina) Julio Musimessi (1953–59)
- (Argentina) Antonio Rattín (1956–70)
- (Argentina) Juan José Rodríguez (1956–62; 1964)
- (Argentina) Osvaldo Nardiello (1958–62)
- (Argentina) Ernesto Grillo (1960–66)
- (Argentina) Silvio Marzolini (1960–72)
- (Argentina) Antonio Roma (1960–72)
- (Brazil) Heleno de Freitas (1948–49)
- (Brazil) Paulo Valentim (1960–64)
- (Brazil) Almir Pernambuquinho (1961–62)
- (Brazil) Orlando (1961–65)
- (Argentina) Alberto Mario González (1962–68)
- (Argentina) Norberto Menéndez (1962–67)
- (Argentina) José María Silvero (1962–66)
- (Argentina) Carmelo Simeone (1962–67)
- (Argentina) Ángel Clemente Rojas (1963–71)
- (Uruguay) Alcides Silveira (1963–68)
- (Argentina) Óscar Pianetti (1964–71)
- (Argentina) Alfredo Rojas (1964–68)
- (Argentina) Norberto Madurga (1966–71)
- (Italy) Nicolás Novello (1966–72; 1974)
- (Argentina) Armando Ovide (1966–76)
- (Argentina) Ramón Héctor Ponce (1966–74)
- (Argentina) Miguel Nicolau (1967–72; 1974–75)
- (Argentina) Rubén Omar Sánchez (1967–75)
- (Argentina) Rubén Suñé (1967–72; 1976–80)
- (Peru) Julio Meléndez (1968–72)
- (Argentina) Roberto Rogel (1968–75)
- (Argentina) Jorge Coch (1969–71; 1980)
- (Uruguay) Orlando José Medina (1969–72)
- (Argentina) Rubén Peracca (1969–73)

==== 1970s–1990s ====
- (Argentina) Hugo Curioni (1970–73)
- (Argentina) Enzo Ferrero (1971–75)
- (Argentina) Roberto Mouzo (1971–84)
- (Argentina) Osvaldo Potente (1971–75; 1979–80)
- (Argentina) Jorge José Benítez (1973–83)
- (Argentina) Vicente Pernía (1973–81)
- (Argentina) Alberto Tarantini (1973–77)
- (Argentina) Marcelo Trobbiani (1973–76; 1981–82)
- (Argentina) Carlos García Cambón (1974–77)
- (Argentina) Abel Alves (1975–83)
- (Argentina) Darío Felman (1975–78)
- (Argentina) Hugo Gatti (1976–88)
- (Argentina) Ernesto Mastrangelo (1976–81)
- (Argentina) Jorge Ribolzi (1976–78, 1980–81)
- (Argentina) Francisco Sá (1976–81)
- (Argentina) José María Suárez (1976–82)
- (Argentina) Carlos Veglio (1976–78; 1980)
- (Argentina) Mario Zanabria (1976–80)
- (Argentina) Hugo Alves (1977–84)
- (Argentina) Hugo Perotti (1977–82; 1982–84)
- (Argentina) Carlos Córdoba (1978–84)
- (Argentina) Ricardo Gareca (1978–80; 1982–84)
- (Argentina) Oscar Ruggeri (1980–84)
- (Uruguay) Ariel Krasouski (1981–85; 1986–88)
- (Argentina) Diego Maradona (1981–82; 1995–97)
- (Argentina) Roberto Passucci (1981–86)
- (Argentina) Fabián Carrizo (1983–90; 1994–96)
- (Argentina) Ivar Stafuza (1983–91)
- (Argentina) Luis Abramovich (1985–92)
- (Argentina) Alfredo Graciani (1985–91; 1993–94)
- (Argentina) Enrique Hrabina (1985–91)
- (Argentina) Carlos Daniel Tapia (1985–94)
- (Argentina) Jorge Comas (1986–89)
- (Argentina) José Luis Cuciuffo (1987–90)
- (Argentina) Diego Latorre (1987–92; 1996–98)
- (Argentina) José Luis Villarreal (1987–93)
- (Colombia) Carlos Navarro Montoya (1988–96)
- (Argentina) Walter Pico (1988–92; 1994–96)
- (Argentina) Juan Simón (1988–94)
- (Argentina) Diego Soñora (1988–95)
- (Argentina) Blas Giunta (1989–93; 1995–97)
- (Argentina) Víctor Hugo Marchesini (1989–93)
- (Argentina) Carlos Moya (1989–94)

==== 1990s–2000s ====
- (Argentina) Luis Carranza (1992–95)
- (Argentina) Carlos Mac Allister (1992–96)
- (Argentina) Alberto Márcico (1992–95)
- (Uruguay) Sergio Martínez (1992–97)
- (Argentina) Rodolfo Arruabarrena (1993–00)
- (Argentina) Néstor Fabbri (1994–98)
- (Argentina) Claudio Paul Caniggia (1995–98)
- (Argentina) Diego Cagna (1995–98; 2003–05)
- (Argentina) Juan Román Riquelme (1995–02; 2007–14)
- (Argentina) Aníbal Matellán (1996–01; 2004–05)
- (Argentina) Roberto Abbondanzieri (1997–06; 2009–10)
- (Argentina) Guillermo Barros Schelotto (1997–07)
- (Argentina) José Basualdo (1997; 1998–00)
- (Colombia) Jorge Bermúdez (1997–02)
- (Colombia) Óscar Córdoba (1997–01)
- (Argentina) Martín Palermo (1997–00; 2004–11)
- (Argentina) Walter Samuel (1997–00)
- (Argentina) Cristian Traverso (1997–02; 2004–05)
- (Argentina) Antonio Barijho (1998–02; 2003–04)
- (Colombia) Mauricio Serna (1998–02)
- (Argentina) Hugo Ibarra (1998–01; 2002–03; 2007–10)
- (Argentina) Sebastián Battaglia (1998–03; 2005–13)
- (Argentina) Nicolás Burdisso (1999–04)

==== 2000s– ====
- (Argentina) Marcelo Delgado (2000–03; 2005–06)
- (Argentina) José María Calvo (2000–06; 2008–11)
- (Argentina) Clemente Rodríguez (2001–04; 2007; 2010–13)
- (Argentina) Rolando Schiavi (2001–05; 2011–12)
- (Argentina) Carlos Tevez (2001–04; 2015–16; 2018–21)
- (Argentina) Raúl Alfredo Cascini (2002–05)
- (Argentina) Pablo Ledesma (2003–08; 2012–14)
- (Colombia) Fabián Vargas (2003–06; 2007–09)
- (Argentina) Neri Cardozo (2004–08)
- (Argentina) Fernando Gago (2004–07; 2013–18)
- (Paraguay) Claudio Morel Rodríguez (2004–10)
- (Argentina) Cristian Chávez (2005–13)
- (Argentina) Daniel Díaz (2005–07; 2013–16)
- (Argentina) Rodrigo Palacio (2005–09)
- (Argentina) Facundo Roncaglia (2007–12; 2022–23)
- (Argentina) Pablo Mouche (2007-12)
- (Argentina) Lucas Viatri (2008-13)
- (Chile) Gary Medel (2009–2011; 2024–25)
- (Argentina) Juan Sánchez Miño (2009-13)
- (Argentina) Nicolás Colazo (2009-13; 2014-16)
- (Argentina) Juan Manuel Insaurralde (2010-12; 2016-18)
- (Argentina) Cristian Erbes (2010-16)
- (Argentina) Walter Erviti (2011–13)
- (Argentina) Agustín Orion (2011–16)
- (Argentina) Guillermo Fernández (2012–15; 2020; 2022–24)
- (Argentina) Cristian Pavón (2014–22)
- (Argentina) Pablo Pérez (2015–18)
- (Argentina) Darío Benedetto (2016–19; 2022–24)
- (Argentina) Leonardo Jara (2016-19; 2020-21)
- (Colombia) Frank Fabra (2016–25)
- (Argentina) Agustín Rossi (2017–23)
- (Argentina) Ramón Ábila (2018–22)
- (Argentina) Julio Buffarini (2018-21)
- (Argentina) Carlos Izquierdoz (2018–22)
- (Colombia) Sebastián Villa (2018–23; 2026-)
- (Colombia) Jorman Campuzano (2019-22; 2023-24)
- (Argentina) Alan Varela (2020–23)
- (Argentina) Cristian Medina (2020–24)
- (Argentina) Exequiel Zeballos (2020–26)
- (Peru) Luis Advíncula (2021–25)
- (Argentina) Marcos Rojo (2021–25)
- (Argentina) Nicolás Figal (2022-)
- (Uruguay) Miguel Merentiel (2023–)
- (Argentina) Lautaro Blanco (2024-)

== Coaches ==
The first Boca Juniors coach recorded is Mario Fortunato, who had been player before becoming coach of the team. Fortunato led Boca to win a total of five titles (4 league in 1930, 1931, 1934 and 1935) and one National cup (Copa de Competencia Británica in 1946). He had three tenures on the club, coaching Boca Juniors in 1930–1936, 1946 and 1956.

Carlos Bianchi is the most successful coach in Boca Juniors' history, having won nine titles, including Aperturas in 1998, 2000 and 2003, the 1999 Clausura, the Copa Libertadores in 2000, 2001 and 2003, and the Intercontinental Cup in 2000 and 2003.

Juan Carlos Lorenzo (1976–79, 1987), El Toto, won five titles with the team, including the Copa Libertadores in 1977 and 1978, the Intercontinental Cup in 1977, and the Metropolitano and Nacional in 1976.

Alfio Basile also won 5 titles along with Mario Fortunato and Toto Lorenzo. With Basile, Boca won two domestic titles, 2005 Apertura and 2006 Clausura and three international (2005 Copa Sudamericana, 2005 and 2006 Recopa Sudamericana), all of them won within two years.

Miguel Ángel Russo (2007, 2020-21, 2025) won 3 titles, including the 2007 Copa Libertadores, the last one won by the club to date. Russo also obtained the 2019-20 Primera División title and the 2020 Copa de la Liga Profesional.

=== Current coaching staff ===
Position	Staff
Head coach	(Argentina) Rodolfo Arruabarrena
Assistant coach	(Argentina) Diego Markic
Assistant coach	(Argentina) Juan Gobet
Fitness coach	(Argentina) Gustavo Roberti
Fitness coach	(Argentina) Cristian Aquino
Goalkeeping coach	(Argentina) Cristián Muñoz
Video analyst	(Egypt) Amr Mokhtar
Team doctor	(Argentina) Jorge Batista
Team doctor	(Argentina) Matias Luna
Team doctor	(Argentina) Lucas Logioco
Kinesiologist	(Argentina) Leonardo Betchakian
Kinesiologist	(Argentina) Jorge Fredes
Kinesiologist	(Argentina) Pablo Varela

Last updated: 18 June 2026
Source: Cuerpo técnico

== Institutional ==
=== Executive board ===
Juan Román Riquelme is the current President of Boca Juniors since December 2023, when he was elected over Andrés Ibarra, getting more than 65% of the votes (a record of 46,400 members went to the club to vote). Jorge Amor Ameal (which was president 2019–23) was elected vice-president of the club.

=== Staff ===
Presidents of Boca Juniors sections
Section	Name
Football	Juan Román Riquelme
Basketball	Alejandro Desimone
Amateur sports	Pablo Szawarniak
Culture	Silvia Gottero

Last updated: 15 October 2024
Source: Autoridades

== Honours ==
=== Senior titles ===
Keys

- Record
- ^{(s)} Shared record

Type	Competition	Titles	Winning years
National (League)	Primera División	36	1919, 1920, 1923, 1924, 1926, 1930, 1931 LAF, 1934 LAF, 1935, 1940, 1943, 1944, 1954, 1962, 1964, 1965, 1969 Nacional, 1970 Nacional, 1976 Metropolitano, 1976 Nacional, 1981 Metropolitano, 1992 Apertura, 1998 Apertura, 1999 Clausura, 2000 Apertura, 2003 Apertura, 2005 Apertura, 2006 Clausura, 2008 Apertura, 2011 Apertura, 2015, 2016–17, 2017–18, 2019–20, 2022, 2026 Liga
National (Cups)	Copa Argentina	4	1969, 2012, 2015, 2019–20
National (Cups)	Supercopa Argentina	2	2018, 2022
National (Cups)	Copa de la Liga	2	2020, 2022
National (Cups)	Copa Jockey Club	2	1919, 1925
National (Cups)	Copa Ibarguren	5^{(s)}	1919, 1923, 1924, 1940, 1944
National (Cups)	Copa Estímulo	1^{(s)}	1926
National (Cups)	Copa Británica	1^{(s)}	1946
International	Copa Libertadores (Note: CONMEBOL competition)	6	1977, 1978, 2000, 2001, 2003, 2007
International	Copa Sudamericana	3	2004, 2005, 2026
International	Recopa Sudamericana	4	1990, 2005, 2006, 2008
International	Supercopa Libertadores	1	1989
International	Copa de Oro	1^{(s)}	1993
International	Copa Master	1^{(s)}	1992
International	Tie Cup (Note: Organised by AFA and AUF together)	1	1919
International	Copa de Honor Cousenier	1	1920
International	Copa Escobar-Gerona	2	1945, (Note: Title shared with Nacional.) 1946
Worldwide	Intercontinental Cup (Note: Organised by UEFA and Conmebol together)	3^{(s)}	1977, 2000, 2003

=== Other titles ===
Independent leagues

- Liga Central de Football: 1906
- Copa Barone (Note: Organised by Liga Albión de Football. After winning this title, Boca Juniors registered to the Argentine Football Association.): 1908

Friendly

- Copa La Reacción: 1909
- Copa Riachuelo: 1910
- Copa Consejo Deliberante: 1922
- Copa Cervecería del Norte: 1926
- Copa Standart: 1926
- Copa Banco Comercial: 1927
- Copa Intendencia de Tandil: 1927
- Triangular Nocturno: 1940
- Copa Jorge IV: 1945
- Gobernación de Mendoza: 1954
- Trofeo "Joyería Grossi": 1954
- Torneo de Buenos Aires: 1962
- Torneo Triangular Buenos Aires: 1963
- Torneo Cuadrangular de Montevideo: 1963
- Mohammed V Trophy: 1964
- Copa 60th Anniversary Boca Juniors: 1965
- Trofeo Ciudad de San Sebastián (Spain): 1966
- Copa Rio de la Plata: 1970
- Trofeo Ciudad de Valladolid (Spain): 1975
- Cuadrangular de los Grandes: 1985
- Trofeo Naranja: 1985
- Trofeo Isla de Tenerife: 1993
- Vodafone Cup (England): 2004
- Copa 100 Años de Atilio García (Uruguay): 2014
- Antonio Puerta Trophy (Spain): 2016
- Maradona Cup: 2021

=== Reserve and Youth titles ===
For the reserve and academy honours, see Boca Juniors Reserves and Academy

== Facts ==
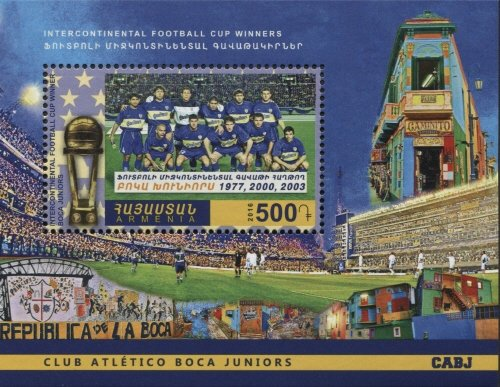
Armenian stamp honoring the club's 3 Intercontinental Cup titles

National titles won by Boca Juniors include 36 Primera División championships, and 17 domestic cups.

Boca Juniors also owns an honorary title awarded by the Argentine Football Association for their successful tour of Europe in 1925.

Internationally, Boca Juniors has won 22 major titles, with 18 organised by CONMEBOL and the rest organised jointly by the Argentine and Uruguayan Associations.

Consequently, Boca is ranked third in the world in terms of number of complete international titles, after Real Madrid (35) and Egyptian side Al Ahly (26).

Boca Juniors' international achievements also include one Tie Cup, one Copa de Honor Cousenier, and two Copa Escobar-Gerona, organized jointly by AFA and AUF together.

Their success usually has the Boca Juniors ranked among the IFFHS's Club World Ranking Top 25, which they have reached the top position six times (mostly during the coaching tenure of Carlos Bianchi).

Boca was named by the IFFHS as the top South American club of the first decade of the 21st century (2001–2010). It was designated by FIFA as the joint twelfth-best Club of the Century, in December 2000, occupying the same place as Liverpool of England, Internazionale of Italy, and Benfica of Portugal, among others.

=== Records ===
- Seasons in Primera División: 111 (never relegated since the team's debut in 1913).
- Largest win:
  - Domestic: 11–1 to Tigre, on 7 June 1942.
  - International: 7–0 to Bolívar on 26 April 2007 at 2007 Copa Libertadores
- Worst defeat:
  - Domestic: 0–7 v San Isidro on 10 October 1915.
  - International: 1–6 v Palmeiras at 1994 Copa Libertadores
- Worst position in official domestic tournaments: 19th. at 2013 Torneo Final
- All-time topscorer: Martín Palermo (236 goals)
- Topscorer in a single tournament: Domingo Tarasconi (40 goals in 33 games during 1923 Primera División)
- Topscorer at international tournaments: Martín Palermo (43 goals)
- Topscorer at Copa Libertadores: Román Riquelme (25 goals)
- Most games unbeaten in domestic tournaments: 40 matches (from 15th fixture of Clausura 1998 to 16th fixture of 1999 Clausura)
- Most capped player: Roberto Mouzo (426 matches)
- Player with most titles won: Sebastián Battaglia (17 titles)
- Goalkeeper with minute-record scoreless goal: Esteban Andrada (864' with no goals allowed)
- Tied for 4th club in the world with most international cups won (18)

== Football development ==
=== Reserves and academy ===
The reserve and youth academy football teams of the club, currently coached by former club player Rolando Schiavi, who debuted in February 2015.

Boca Juniors is the most winning Torneo de Reserva championships with 21 titles won since it was established in 1910.

Notable youth academy alumni and Argentine players include Américo Tesoriere, Natalio Pescia, Ernesto Lazzatti, Antonio Rattín, Ángel Clemente Rojas, Roberto Mouzo, Oscar Ruggeri, Diego Latorre, Carlos Tevez, Éver Banega, Leandro Paredes, Nicolás Burdisso, Nahuel Molina, Sebastián Battaglia and Fernando Gago, among others.

=== Women's football ===
The Boca Juniors women's football team plays in the Campeonato de Fútbol Femenino and have won the championship a record 27 times of which 10 were in succession from the 2003 Apertura to the 2008 Clausura.

Though the club has not yet won any international competition, it secured the third place at the 2010 Copa Libertadores de Fútbol Femenino, and in the 2022 Copa Libertadores Femenina finished in second place.

== Other sports sections ==
In addition to men's football, Boca Juniors has a professional basketball section.

Other (amateur) activities held in the club are: bocce, boxing, chess, field hockey, futsal, artistic and rhythmic gymnastics, handball, martial arts (judo, karate, and taekwondo), swimming, volleyball, weightlifting, and wrestling.

=== Basketball ===
The Boca Juniors basketball team, established in 1929, won several Argentine championships organised by now-defunct bodies "Asociación de Básquetbol de Buenos Aires" and "Federación Argentina de Básquetbol".

Since the Liga Nacional de Básquet was created in 1985, Boca Juniors has won the LNB league title five times (1996–97, 2003–04, 2006–07, 2023-24 and 2024-25), five Copa Argentina (2002, 2003, 2004, 2005, and 2006), one Torneo Top 4 (in 2004), one Supercopa de La Liga (in 2024) and Copa Super 20 (in 2025).

At international level, Boca Juniors won three South American Club Championships in 2004, 2005, and 2006. The club won its first Basketball Champions League Americas in the season 2025-26. Subsequently, Boca earned 3rd place on the 2026 FIBA Intercontinental Cup.

Their home arena is the Estadio Luis Conde, better known as La Bombonerita (small Bombonera).

=== Field hockey ===
In September 2022, Boca Juniors announced the club would open a field hockey section for men and women.

In May 2023, the club inaugurated a hockey field, with Las Leonas all-time top scorer Vanina Oneto as part of the project.

Oneto was appointed manager of Boca Juniors Hockey.

=== Futsal ===
Boca Juniors men's compete in Primera División de Futsal, the top division of the futsal league system and organised by AFA.

The club is the 2nd most winning team (after Club Pinocho) of Primera División, with 13 titles. One of those came in 2017 when they defeated Kimberley in the finals.

The men's team won those thirteen league championship in 1992, 1993, 1997 Clausura, 1998 Apertura, 2003 Clausura, 2011 Clausura, 2012 Apertura, 2013 Apertura, 2013 Clausura, 2014 Apertura, 2014 Clausura, 2017, 2020–21.

Boca also has a women's futsal team which plays in the Campeonato de Futsal Femenino, they won the inaugural tournament in 2004 and won it again in 2014.

=== Volleyball ===
Boca Juniors has a men's professional volleyball team that won the Metropolitan championship in 1991, 1992 and 1996, and achieved the second place in the 1996–97 A1 season.

Because of a lack of sponsors, the team was disbanded, but later it was reincorporated through the coaching of former Boca player Marcelo Gigante; after playing in the second division, it returned to the A1 league in 2005.

In August 2015 it was announced that Boca Juniors's volleyball team would not participate in the Liga Argentina de Voleibol – Serie A1 from 2016. The decision was personally taken by Boca Juniors chairman, Daniel Angelici.

The club alleged that taking part in a professional league resulted in a hugh commercial deficit so Boca Juniors declined to participate, although the volleyball department had reached an agreement with several sponsors which would put the money to cover the costs (about A$ 3 million).

On 1 August 2023, it was announced that Boca Juniors after almost 8 years, will once again play in the Liga Argentina de Voleibol – Serie A1.

Boca has a women's volleyball team that plays in the Liga Femenina de Voleibol Argentino and it has won the tournament a record 8 times (2010–11, 2011–12, 2013–14, 2014–15, 2018, 2019, 2022, 2023).

=== Miscellaneous ===
Boca representatives compete in other disciplines such as judo, karate, taekwondo, wrestling, weight lifting and gymnastics, amongst others.

== Merchandising ==
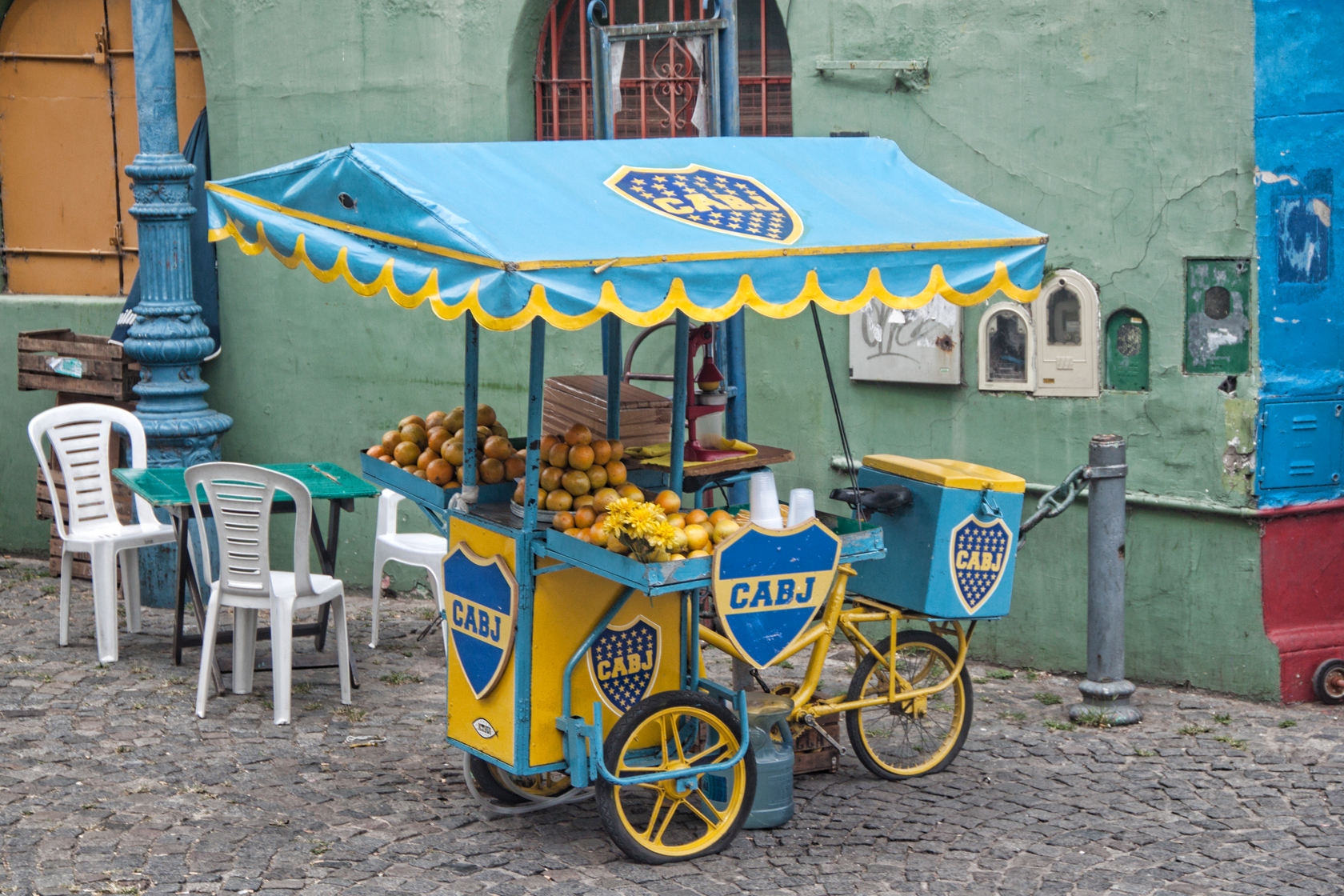
Boca Juniors themed street vendor in La Boca

Boca Juniors has expanded its activity beyond sport, providing its fans with a number of other products and services.

In 2003, it became the fifth football club in the world to open its own TV channel. Boca TV broadcast 24 hours a day, featuring sports programs and talk shows. The channel was closed in 2005 due to low audience, returning in 2015 as a website.

In 2005, a funerary company started to produce a line of coffins available for dead fans.

The club also opened a "Boca Juniors" exclusive section of 3,000 hectare in the Parque Iraola Cemetery of La Plata Partido in 2006.

Also in 2006, Boca expanded its business launching its own fleet of taxis operating in Buenos Aires, as well as its own brand of wine, called "Vino Boca Juniors".

In 2012 Boca Juniors opened in Buenos Aires its first thematic hotel not only in Argentina but worldwide. The hotel was designed by Uruguayan architect Carlos Ott. All the rooms were decorated with the colours of the club, apart from photos and paintings of notable players in the history of the club.

There is an Argentine steakhouse in Queens, NYC which is a Boca Juniors theme restaurant.

== Sponsorships ==
In racing, Argentine Turismo Carretera stock-car competition league spun off the Top Race V6 category, in which teams were sponsored by football teams.

Veteran race pilots Guillermo Ortelli and Ernesto Bessone and former Boca player Vicente Pernía drove for the "Boca Juniors" team; Ortelli finally won the first Top Race V6 championship with his car painted in Boca Juniors colors.

== See also ==
- List of world champion football clubs
