= 2024 Club Atlético Boca Juniors season =

Boca Juniors
2024 season
- President: Juan Román Riquelme
- Manager: Diego Martínez (until 28 September); Mariano Herrón (interim, from 29 September to 13 October); Fernando Gago (from 14 October)
- Stadium: Estadio Alberto J. Armando
- Primera División: 6th
- Copa Argentina: Semi-finals
- Copa de la Liga Profesional: Semi-finals
- Copa Sudamericana: Round of 16
- Top goalscorer: League: Miguel Merentiel (7); All: Edinson Cavani (20)
- Average home league attendance: 57,200
Home colours	Away colours	Third colours

The 2024 Club Atlético Boca Juniors season was the 96th consecutive season in the top flight of Argentine football. In addition to the domestic league, Boca Juniors participated in this season's editions of the Copa de la Liga Profesional, the Copa Argentina, and the 2024 Copa Sudamericana.

== Season overview ==
=== December ===
Diego Martínez is appointed as new manager. Facundo Roncaglia and Diego González ended their contract with the club. Aaron Molinas, Nazareno Solís, Agustín Obando and Gonzalo Maroni returned from their respective loans.

=== January ===
Cristian Lema arrives from Lanús. Agustín Obando is loaned until the end of the season to Platense. Gonzalo Maroni is loaned until the end of the season to Tigre. Nazareno Solís is loaned until the end of the season to Gimnasia y Esgrima (M). Nahuel Génez is loaned until the end of the season to Tigre. Valentín Barco is transferred to Brighton & Hove Albion. Kevin Zenón arrives from Unión. On 27 January Boca drew 0–0 against Platense. Lautaro Blanco arrives from Elche. Aaron Molinas is transferred to Defensa y Justicia.

=== February ===
On 1 February, Boca drew 1–1 against Sarmiento (J). On 5 February, Boca defeated Tigre 2-0. Bruno Valdez is loaned until the end of the season to Cerro Porteño. On 10 February, Boca drew 0–0 against Defensa y Justicia. On 14 February, Boca defeated Central Córdoba (SdE) 2-0. On 18 February, Boca lost 1–2 against Lanús. On 25 February the Superclásico against River Plate ended 1-1.

=== March ===
On 3 March, Boca defeated Belgrano 3-2. On 6 March, Boca lost 0–1 against Unión. On 10 March, Boca defeated Racing 4-2. On 23 March, Boca defeated Central Norte 3-0 and advanced to the round of 32 of Copa Argentina. Marcelo Weigandt is loaned until the end of the season to Inter Miami. On 30 March, Boca defeated San Lorenzo 2-1.

=== April ===
On the first match of Copa Sudamericana Boca drew 0–0 against Nacional Potosí in Bolivia. On 6 April, Boca defeated Newell's Old Boys 3-1. On 9 April Boca defeated Sportivo Trinidense 1–0 in Copa Sudamericana. On 12 April, Boca lost 0–1 against Estudiantes (LP) the suspended match. On 16 April, Boca defeated Godoy Cruz 1-0 and qualified for the quarterfinals of Copa de la Liga. On 21 April Boca won the Superclásico against River Plate 3-2 and advanced to the semifinals of Copa de la Liga. On 25 April, Boca lost 2–4 against Fortaleza in Copa Sudamericana. After a 1–1 draw and a 1–3 loss on penalties, Estudiantes (LP) defeated Boca and is eliminated from Copa de la Liga.

=== May ===
On 8 May Boca defeated Sportivo Trinidense 2–1 in Copa Sudamericana. On 12 May, Boca lost 0–1 against Atlético Tucumán in the start of Argentine Primera División. On 15 May Boca drew 1–1 against Fortaleza in Copa Sudamericana. On 19 May Boca defeated Central Córdoba (SdE) 4-2. On 25 May, Boca drew 0–0 against Talleres (C). On 29 May Boca defeated Nacional Potosí 4–0 in Copa Sudamericana and advanced to the Knockout round play-offs.

=== June ===
On 2 June Boca lost 0–1 against Platense. After playing in 2009-2011, Gary Medel arrives as a free agent from Vasco da Gama. On 14 June Boca defeated Vélez Sarsfield 1-0. On 19 June, Boca defeated Almirante Brown 2-1 and advanced to the round of 16 of Copa Argentina. Jorman Campuzano is loaned to Atlético Nacional.

=== July ===
Tomás Belmonte arrives from Toluca. Milton Giménez arrives from Banfield and Brian Aguirre arrives from Newell's Old Boys. Jan Carlos Hurtado return from their loan and is loaned again to Atlético Goianiense. On 17 July Boca drew 1–1 against Independiente del Valle in Copa Sudamericana. Boca and Darío Benedetto agreed to mutually terminate the forward's contract. On 21 July, Boca drew 2–2 against Defensa y Justicia. On 24 July Boca defeated 1-0 Independiente del Valle and advanced to the round of 16 of Copa Sudamericana. On 28 July, Boca drew 0–0 against Instituto. Agustín Martegani arrives from San Lorenzo. On 31 July Boca defeated 3-0 Banfield.

=== August ===
Luca Langoni is transferred to New England Revolution. On 4 August, Boca drew 1–1 against Barracas Central. Ezequiel Fernández is transferred to Al Qadsiah. Aaron Anselmino is transferred to Chelsea remaining in Boca on a twelve-month loan deal. On 10 August, Boca drew 1–1 against Independiente Rivadavia. Ignacio Miramón arrives on loan from Lille. On 15 August Boca defeated Cruzeiro 1–0 in Copa Sudamericana. Norberto Briasco is loaned to Gimnasia y Esgrima (LP). On 18 August Boca defeated 3-2 San Lorenzo. On 22 August, after a 2–1 loss and a 4–5 defeat on penalties against Cruzeiro, Boca is eliminated of Copa Sudamericana. On 26 August, Boca drew 1–1 against Estudiantes (LP). Juan Barinaga arrives from Belgrano. On 31 August Boca defeated 2-1 Rosario Central.

=== September ===
Vicente Taborda is loaned until the end of the season 2025 to Platense. Agustín Obando ended the loan to Platense and is loaned until the end of the season 2025 to Banfield. On 7 September after a 1–1 draw and an 8–7 win on penalties, Boca defeated Talleres (C) and advanced to the quarterfinals of Copa Argentina. On 14 September Boca lost 1–2 against Racing Club. On 21 September Boca lost the Superclásico 0-1. On 28 September Boca lost 0–2 against Belgrano. After the loss, Diego Martínez resigned as Manager and Mariano Herrón is appointed as interim manager.

=== October ===
On 6 October Boca defeated 1-0 Argentinos Juniors. Fernando Gago is appointed as new manager. On 19 October Boca lost 0–3 against Tigre. On 23 October after a 1–1 draw and a 2–1 win on penalties, Boca defeated Gimnasia y Esgrima (LP) and advanced to the semifinals of Copa Argentina. On 27 October Boca drew 1–1 against Deportivo Riestra.

=== November ===
On 3 November Boca lost 0–1 against Lanús. On 6 November Boca defeated 4-1 Godoy Cruz. On 10 November Boca defeated 2-0 Sarmiento (J). On 20 November Boca defeated 1-0 Union. On 24 November Boca drew 0–0 against Huracan. On 26 November Boca lost 3–4 against Vélez Sarsfield in the semifinals of Copa Argentina.

=== December ===
On 1 December Boca defeated 1-0 Gimnasia y Esgrima (LP). On 8 December Boca defeated 1-0 Newell's Old Boys. The last match of the season was a 0–0 draw against Independiente.

== Current squad ==
Last updated on 15 December 2024.

Squad no.	Name	Nationality	Position	Date of birth (age)	Apps	Goals	Last team	Note
Goalkeepers
1	Sergio Romero (VC 2º)	(Argentina)	GK	22 February 1987 (age 39)	88	-77	(Italy) Venezia	
12	Leandro Brey	(Argentina)	GK	21 September 2002 (age 24)	22	-16	(Argentina) Los Andes	
13	Javier García	(Argentina)	GK	29 January 1987 (age 39)	74	-90	(Argentina) Racing	
Defenders
2	Cristian Lema	(Argentina)	DF	24 March 1990 (age 36)	34	1	(Argentina) Lanús	
3	Marcelo Saracchi	(Uruguay)	DF	23 April 1998 (age 28)	41	3	(Spain) Levante	
4	Nicolás Figal	(Argentina)	DF	3 April 1994 (age 32)	106	5	(United States) Inter Miami	
6	Marcos Rojo (C)	(Argentina)	DF	20 March 1990 (age 36)	105	8	(England) Manchester United	
15	Nicolás Valentini	(Argentina)	DF	6 April 2001 (age 25)	47	2	(Argentina) Aldosivi	
17	Luis Advíncula	(Peru)	DF	2 March 1990 (age 36)	145	5	(Spain) Rayo Vallecano	
18	Frank Fabra	(Colombia)	DF	22 February 1991 (age 35)	240	15	(Colombia) Independiente Medellín	
23	Lautaro Blanco	(Argentina)	DF	19 September 1999 (age 27)	46	0	(Spain) Elche	
24	Juan Barinaga	(Argentina)	DF	10 October 2000 (age 25)	10	0	(Argentina) Belgrano	
34	Mateo Mendía	(Argentina)	DF	3 February 2004 (age 22)	4	0	(Argentina) Youth team	
38	Aaron Anselmino	(Argentina)	DF	29 April 2005 (age 21)	23	2	(Argentina) Youth team	
40	Lautaro Di Lollo	(Argentina)	DF	10 March 2004 (age 22)	21	0	(Argentina) Youth team	
42	Lucas Blondel	(Argentina)	DF	14 September 1996 (age 30)	19	4	(Argentina) Tigre	
48	Dylan Gorosito	(Argentina)	DF	3 February 2006 (age 20)	1	0	(Argentina) Youth team	
52	Walter Molas	(Argentina)	DF	23 June 2004 (age 22)	2	0	(Argentina) Youth team	
Midfielders
5	Gary Medel	(Chile)	MF	8 March 1987 (age 39)	59	7	(Brazil) Vasco da Gama	
8	Guillermo Fernández (VC 3º)	(Argentina)	MF	11 October 1991 (age 34)	190	10	(Mexico) Cruz Azul	
19	Agustín Martegani	(Argentina)	MF	20 May 2000 (age 26)	11	0	(Argentina) San Lorenzo	
20	Juan Ramírez	(Argentina)	MF	25 May 1993 (age 33)	95	2	(Argentina) San Lorenzo	
21	Ignacio Miramón	(Argentina)	MF	12 June 2003 (age 23)	16	0	(France) Lille	
22	Kevin Zenón	(Argentina)	MF	30 July 2001 (age 25)	46	6	(Argentina) Unión	
30	Tomás Belmonte	(Argentina)	MF	27 May 1998 (age 28)	20	1	(Mexico) Toluca	
36	Cristian Medina	(Argentina)	MF	1 June 2002 (age 24)	160	9	(Argentina) Youth team	
43	Milton Delgado	(Argentina)	MF	16 June 2005 (age 21)	17	0	(Argentina) Youth team	
45	Mauricio Benítez	(Argentina)	MF	3 February 2004 (age 22)	11	0	(Argentina) Youth team	
47	Jabes Saralegui	(Argentina)	MF	12 April 2003 (age 23)	42	1	(Argentina) Youth team	
50	Julian Ceballos	(Argentina)	MF	13 September 2004 (age 22)	5	0	(Argentina) Youth team	
51	Santiago Dalmasso	(Argentina)	MF	18 June 2004 (age 22)	2	0	(Argentina) Youth team	
53	Joaquín Ruiz	(Argentina)	MF	21 July 2006 (age 20)	2	0	(Argentina) Youth team	
Forwards
7	Exequiel Zeballos	(Argentina)	FW	24 April 2002 (age 24)	92	9	(Argentina) Youth team	
9	Milton Giménez	(Argentina)	FW	12 August 1996 (age 30)	25	7	(Argentina) Banfield	
10	Edinson Cavani	(Uruguay)	FW	14 February 1987 (age 39)	55	23	(Spain) Valencia	
11	Lucas Janson	(Argentina)	FW	16 August 1994 (age 32)	41	2	(Argentina) Vélez Sarsfield	
16	Miguel Merentiel	(Uruguay)	FW	24 February 1996 (age 30)	99	35	(Brazil) Palmeiras	
33	Brian Aguirre	(Argentina)	FW	6 January 2003 (age 23)	18	3	(Argentina) Newell's Old Boys	
41	Iker Zufiaurre	(Argentina)	FW	7 August 2005 (age 21)	3	0	(Argentina) Youth team	

== Transfers ==
=== Summer ===
==== In ====
Players transferred
Pos.	Name	Club	Fee
DF	(Argentina) Lautaro Blanco	(Spain) Elche	Free
DF	(Argentina) Cristian Lema	(Argentina) Lanús	Undisclosed
MF	(Argentina) Kevin Zenón	(Argentina) Unión	$3.5M

Players loaned
Pos.	Name	Club	End date

Loan Return
Pos.	Name	Return from
MF	(Argentina) Gonzalo Maroni	(Argentina) San Lorenzo
MF	(Argentina) Aaron Molinas	(Argentina) Tigre
MF	(Argentina) Agustín Obando	(Argentina) Tigre
FW	(Argentina) Nazareno Solís	(Argentina) Patronato

==== Out ====
Players transferred
Pos.	Name	Club	Fee
DF	(Argentina) Facundo Roncaglia	(Argentina) Sarmiento	Free
MF	(Argentina) Diego González	(Chile) Unión Española	Free
MF	(Argentina) Aaron Molinas	(Argentina) Defensa y Justicia	Undisclosed

Players loaned
Pos.	Name	Club	End date
DF	(Argentina) Nahuel Génez	(Argentina) Tigre	December 2024
DF	(Paraguay) Bruno Valdez	(Paraguay) Cerro Porteño	December 2024
DF	(Argentina) Marcelo Weigandt	(United States) Inter Miami	December 2024
MF	(Argentina) Gonzalo Maroni	(Argentina) Tigre	December 2024
FW	(Argentina) Agustín Obando	(Argentina) Platense	December 2024
FW	(Argentina) Nazareno Solís	(Argentina) Gimnasia y Esgrima (M)	December 2024

Loan return
Pos.	Name	Return to

=== Winter ===
==== In ====
Players transferred
Pos.	Name	Club	Fee
DF	(Argentina) Juan Barinaga	(Argentina) Belgrano	$3.000.000
MF	(Argentina) Tomás Belmonte	(Mexico) Toluca	Undisclosed
MF	(Argentina) Agustín Martegani	(Argentina) San Lorenzo	Undisclosed
MF	(Chile) Gary Medel	(Brazil) Vasco da Gama	Free
FW	(Argentina) Brian Aguirre	(Argentina) Newell's Old Boys	Undisclosed
FW	(Argentina) Milton Giménez	(Argentina) Banfield	Undisclosed

Players loaned
Pos.	Name	Club	End date
DF	(Argentina) Aaron Anselmino	(England) Chelsea	June 2025
MF	(Argentina) Ignacio Miramón	(France) Lille	December 2025

Loan Return
Pos.	Name	Return from
FW	(Venezuela) Jan Carlos Hurtado	(Ecuador) LDU Quito

==== Out ====
Players transferred
Pos.	Name	Club	Fee
DF	(Argentina) Aaron Anselmino	(England) Chelsea	Undisclosed
MF	(Argentina) Ezequiel Fernández	(Saudi Arabia) Al Qadsiah	Undisclosed
FW	(Argentina) Darío Benedetto	(Mexico) Querétaro	Free
FW	(Argentina) Luca Langoni	(United States) New England Revolution	Undisclosed

Players loaned
Pos.	Name	Club	End date
MF	(Colombia) Jorman Campuzano	(Colombia) Atlético Nacional	June 2025
FW	(Armenia) Norberto Briasco	(Argentina) Gimnasia y Esgrima (LP)	December 2025
FW	(Venezuela) Jan Carlos Hurtado	(Brazil) Atlético Goianiense	June 2025
FW	(Argentina) Agustín Obando	(Argentina) Banfield	December 2025
FW	(Argentina) Vicente Taborda	(Argentina) Platense	December 2025

Loan return
Pos.	Name	Return to
MF	(Argentina) Ezequiel Bullaude	(Netherlands) Feyenoord

== Competitions ==
=== Overall ===
Competition	First match	Last match	Starting round	Final position	Record							
Competition	First match	Last match	Starting round	Final position	Pld	W	D	L	GF	GA	GD	Win %
Primera División	12 May 2024	15 December 2024	Matchday 1	6th	27	11	9	7	30	23	+7	40.74
Copa de la Liga Profesional	27 January 2024	30 April 2024	Group stage	Semifinals	16	8	5	3	24	15	+9	50.00
Copa Argentina	23 March 2024	27 November 2024	Round of 64	Semifinals	5	2	2	1	10	7	+3	40.00
Copa Sudamericana	3 April 2024	22 August 2024	Group stage	Round of 16	10	5	3	2	13	8	+5	50.00
Total					58	26	19	13	77	53	+24	44.83

Last updated: 15 December 2024.
Source: Competitions

=== Primera División ===
==== League table ====
Pos	Team	Pld	W	D	L	GF	GA	GD	Pts
4	Huracán	27	12	10	5	28	18	+10	46
5	River Plate	27	11	10	6	38	21	+17	43
6	Boca Juniors	27	11	9	7	30	23	+7	42
7	Independiente	27	9	13	5	25	17	+8	40
8	Atlético Tucumán	27	11	7	9	28	27	+1	40

Source: AFA
Rules for classification: 1) points; 2) goal difference; 3) goals scored; 4) head-to-head results; 5) fair play ranking 6) drawing of lots.

==== Relegation table ====
Pos	Team	2022 Pts	2023 Pts	2024 Pts	Total Pts	Total Pld	Avg	Relegation
2	Racing	80	60	70	210	123	1.707	
3	Boca Juniors	79	62	67	208	123	1.691	
4	Estudiantes (LP)	61	62	63	186	123	1.512	

==== International qualification ====
Pos	Team	Pld	W	D	L	GF	GA	GD	Pts	Qualification
3	River Plate (Q)	41	18	16	7	64	31	+33	70	Qualification for Copa Libertadores group stage (Note: Vélez Sarsfield, Racing, Estudiantes (LP) and Central Córdoba (SdE) qualified for the Copa Libertadores group stage by winning the 2024 Argentine Primera División, the 2024 Copa Sudamericana, the 2024 Copa de la Liga Profesional and the 2024 Copa Argentina, respectively.)
4	Racing (Q)	41	21	7	13	66	41	+25	70	Qualification for Copa Libertadores group stage
5	Boca Juniors (Q)	41	18	13	10	50	35	+15	67	Qualification for Copa Libertadores second stage
6	Godoy Cruz (Q)	41	17	13	11	47	34	+13	64	Qualification for Copa Sudamericana group stage
7	Estudiantes (LP) (Q)	41	16	15	10	55	43	+12	63	Qualification for Copa Libertadores group stage

Updated to match(es) played on 15 December 2024. Source: AFA
Rules for classification: 1) points; 2) goal difference; 3) goals scored; 4) head-to-head results; 5) fair play ranking 6) drawing of lots.
(Q) Qualified for the phase indicated

==== Results summary ====
Overall								Home						Away					
Pld	W	D	L	GF	GA	GD	Pts	W	D	L	GF	GA	GD	W	D	L	GF	GA	GD
27	11	9	7	30	23	+7	42	8	4	1	18	7	+11	3	5	6	12	16	−4

Source: AFA

==== Results by round ====
Round	1	2	3	4	5	6	7	8	9	10	11	12	13	14	15	16	17	18	19	20	21	22	23	24	25	26	27
Ground	A	A	H	A	H	A	H	A	H	A	H	A	H	A	H	A	H	A	H	A	H	A	H	A	H	A	H
Result	L	W	D	L	W	D	W	D	D	D	W	D	W	L	L	L	W	L	D	L	W	W	W	D	W	W	D
Position	19	11	12	18	11	14	11	19	13	15	8	8	8	10	11	13	10	16	16	17	13	8	8	8	6	6	6

Source: AFA
A = Away; H = Home; W = Win; D = Draw; L = Loss

==== Matches ====
Win Draw Loss Postponed

12 May 2024 1	Atlético Tucumán	1–0	Boca Juniors	San Miguel de Tucumán
20:15 UTC−3	Coronel 28'; Sánchez (yellow card) 45+3'; N. Romero (yellow card) 54'; Tesuri (yellow card) 69'	Report	Figal (yellow card) 32'	Stadium: Monumental José Fierro; Referee: Pablo Echavarría

19 May 2024 2	Central Córdoba (SdE)	2–4	Boca Juniors	Santiago del Estero
20:00 UTC−3	Atencio 2' (yellow card) 40'; Vázquez (yellow card) 41'; Sanabria 45+1'; Godoy (yellow card) 51'	Report	Blanco (yellow card) 15'; E. Fernández 46', 90+6'; Merentiel 51', 79'	Stadium: Único Madre de Ciudades; Referee: Facundo Tello

25 May 2024 3	Boca Juniors	0–0	Talleres (C)	Buenos Aires
20:00 UTC−3	Saracchi (yellow card) 6'; E. Fernández (yellow card) 76'; G. Fernández (yellow card) 82'; Janson (yellow card) 90'	Report	Depietri (yellow card) 33'; M. Portillo (yellow card) 39'; Portilla (yellow card) 90'	Stadium: La Bombonera; Referee: Hernán Mastrángelo

2 June 2024 4	Platense	1–0	Boca Juniors	Florida
14:30 UTC−3	Martínez (yellow card) 5'; Cozzani (yellow card) 9'; Pellegrino 66'	Report	Rojo (yellow card) 4' (yellow-red card) 35'; Lema (yellow card) 42'; G. Fernández (yellow card) 49'; Advíncula (yellow card) 59'; Medina (yellow card) 70'; Merentiel (yellow card) 86'	Stadium: Ciudad de Vicente López; Referee: Nicolás Ramírez

14 June 2024 5	Boca Juniors	1–0	Vélez Sarsfield	Buenos Aires
19:00 UTC−3	E. Fernández (yellow card) 39'; Cavani 60' (red card) 90'; Lema (yellow card) 64'; Blanco (yellow card) 70'; G. Fernández (yellow card) 90+2'	Report	Gómez (yellow card) 90+3'; Ordóñez (red card) 90+3'	Stadium: La Bombonera; Referee: Fernando Echenique

21 July 2024 6	Defensa y Justicia	2–2	Boca Juniors	Florencio Varela
20:00 UTC−3	Ramos Mingo 12'; Molinas 34'	Report	Merentiel 19' (pen.); Gorosito (yellow card) 43'; Gutiérrez 51' (o.g.); G. Fernández (yellow card) 76'; Aguirre (yellow card) 81'	Stadium: Norberto Tomaghello; Referee: Leandro Rey Hilfer

28 July 2024 8	Instituto	0–0	Boca Juniors	Córdoba
20:00 UTC−3		Report	Blanco (yellow card) 15'; Di Lollo (yellow card) 34'	Stadium: Presidente Perón; Referee: Hernán Mastrángelo

31 July 2024 7	Boca Juniors	3–0	Banfield	Buenos Aires
20:30 UTC−3	Cavani 21'; G. Fernández (yellow card) 26'; Merentiel 55'; Figal (yellow card) 63'; Saralegui 90+4'	Report	Núñez (yellow card) 52'; Rodríguez (yellow card) 63'; Roldán (yellow card) 85'; Bonifacio (yellow card) 87'	Stadium: La Bombonera; Referee: Fernando Espinoza

4 August 2024 9	Boca Juniors	1–1	Barracas Central	Buenos Aires
17:30 UTC−3	Figal (yellow card) 10'; Giménez 36'; Belmonte (yellow card) 74'; Medel (yellow card) 81'	Report	Zalazar 6'; Iacobellis (yellow card) 30'	Stadium: La Bombonera; Referee: Fernando Echenique

10 August 2024 10	Independiente Rivadavia	1–1	Boca Juniors	Mendoza
18:45 UTC−3	Villa (penalty missed) 15'; F. Romero (yellow card) 39'; Villalba 76'; Gómez (yellow card) 83'; Ostchega (yellow card) 90+2'	Report	Medel (yellow card) 38'; Figal (yellow card) 42'; S. Romero (yellow card) 76'; Medina 90+5'	Stadium: Bautista Gargantini; Referee: Facundo Tello

18 August 2024 11	Boca Juniors	3–2	San Lorenzo	Buenos Aires
14:30 UTC−3	Giménez 49'; Saracchi 53' (yellow card) 70' (yellow-red card) 90+3'; G. Fernández (yellow card) 74'; Merentiel (yellow card) 81' (goal) 89'; Advíncula (yellow card) 90+6'	Report	Vombergar 19' (pen.); Blanco (yellow card) 24'; Irala (yellow card) 49'; Luján (yellow card) 86'; Leguizamón 90+5' (pen.)	Stadium: La Bombonera; Referee: Pablo Echavarría

26 August 2024 12	Estudiantes (LP)	1–1	Boca Juniors	La Plata
21:00 UTC−3	Lollo (yellow card) 70'; Mansilla (yellow card) 75'; Cetré 79'	Report	Giménez 51' (yellow card) 54' (yellow-red card) 90+5'; Blanco (yellow card) 76'	Stadium: Jorge Luis Hirschi; Referee: Darío Herrera

31 August 2024 13	Boca Juniors	2–1	Rosario Central	Buenos Aires
21:00 UTC−3	Lema 3'; Aguirre 14'; G. Fernández (yellow card) 68'; Medel (yellow card) 73'	Report	Martínez (yellow card) 24'; Barbieri (yellow card) 27'; Sández (yellow card) 51'; Campaz 90+2'	Stadium: La Bombonera; Referee: Jorge Baliño

14 September 2024 14	Racing	2–1	Boca Juniors	Avellaneda
17:30 UTC−3	Nardoni 20' (yellow card) 70'; Martínez 80'	Report	Giménez (yellow card) 12' (goal) 16'; Anselmino (yellow card) 18'; Lema (yellow card) 46'; Blanco (yellow card) 49'	Stadium: Presidente Juan Domingo Perón; Referee: Hernán Mastrángelo

21 September 2024 15	Boca Juniors	0–1	River Plate	Buenos Aires
16:00 UTC−3	Merentiel (yellow card) 40'; Rojo (yellow card) 50'; Lema (yellow card) 88' (yellow-red card) 90+11'; Giménez (yellow card) 90+11'	Report	Gattoni (yellow card) 0'; Lanzini 19'; Simón (yellow card) 43'; Colidio (yellow card) 45+3'; Fonseca (yellow card) 49'; Bustos (yellow card) 78'; González Pírez (yellow card) 80'	Stadium: La Bombonera; Referee: Nicolás Ramírez

28 September 2024 16	Belgrano	2–0	Boca Juniors	Córdoba
20:00 UTC−3	Rolón (yellow card) 27'; Delgado (yellow card) 39'; Quignón (yellow card) 41'; Jara (penalty missed) 58' 58' (yellow card) 71'; Fernández 68' (yellow card) 72'	Report	Figal (yellow card) 56'; Barinaga (yellow card) 62'	Stadium: Julio César Villagra; Referee: Nazareno Arasa

6 October 2024 17	Boca Juniors	1–0	Argentinos Juniors	Buenos Aires
21:00 UTC−3	Cavani (yellow card) 11'; Merentiel 31'; Lema (yellow card) 83'; Belmonte (yellow card) 90+3'	Report	Mac Allister (yellow card) 23'; Herrera (yellow card) 44'	Stadium: La Bombonera; Referee: Leandro Rey Hilfer

19 October 2024 18	Tigre	3–0	Boca Juniors	Victoria
19:15 UTC−3	Paz 27'; Cardozo 84'; S. Medina 90+2'	Report	Medina (yellow card) 31'	Stadium: José Dellagiovanna; Referee: Fernando Echenique

27 October 2024 19	Boca Juniors	1–1	Deportivo Riestra	Buenos Aires
19:00 UTC−3	Figal (yellow card) 32'; Cavani 78'; G. Fernández (red card) 90+5'	Report	Sánchez 15'; Monje (yellow card) 29'; Ramírez (yellow card) 41'; Goitía (yellow card) 45+4'	Stadium: La Bombonera; Referee: Yael Falcón Pérez

3 November 2024 20	Lanús	1–0	Boca Juniors	Lanús
19:30 UTC−3	Rodríguez (yellow card) 28'; Salvio 78'	Report	Rojo (yellow card) 38'; Medel (yellow card) 90+3'	Stadium: Ciudad de Lanús; Referee: Facundo Tello

6 November 2024 21	Boca Juniors	4–1	Godoy Cruz	Buenos Aires
19:30 UTC−3	Aguirre 8'; Cavani 21'; Rojo (yellow card) 32'; Saracchi 47'; Zeballos 81'	Report	N. Fernández 1'; Leyes (yellow card) 22'; Arce (yellow card) 78'	Stadium: La Bombonera; Referee: Ariel Penel

10 November 2024 22	Sarmiento (J)	0–2	Boca Juniors	Junín
21:30 UTC−3	Guiacobini (yellow card) 22'; Gudiño (yellow card) 71'; García (yellow card) 78'	Report	Zeballos (yellow card) 40'; Merentiel (yellow card) 42' (goal) 76'; Figal (yellow card) 69'; Zenón 90+3' (yellow card) 90+5'	Stadium: Eva Perón; Referee: Leandro Rey Hilfer

20 November 2024 23	Boca Juniors	1–0	Unión	Buenos Aires
21:30 UTC−3	Giménez 3'; Miramón (yellow card) 30'; Belmonte (yellow card) 38'	Report	Mosqueira (yellow card) 35'; Rivero (yellow card) 40'; Tanda (yellow card) 80'	Stadium: La Bombonera; Referee: Nicolás Ramírez

23 November 2024 24	Huracán	0–0	Boca Juniors	Buenos Aires
21:45 UTC−3	Mazzantti (yellow card) 38'; Tobio (yellow card) 55'; Ibáñez (yellow card) 62'; Alfonso (yellow card) 90+2'; Ábila (yellow card) 90+3'; Echeverría (yellow card) 90+12'	Report	Di Lollo (yellow card) 37'; Medel (yellow card) 42'; Barinaga (yellow card) 45+8'; Miramón (yellow card) 49'; Cavani (yellow card) 55'; G. Fernández (yellow card) 66'; Fabra (yellow card) 77'	Stadium: Tomás Adolfo Ducó; Referee: Hernán Mastrángelo

1 December 2024 25	Boca Juniors	1–0	Gimnasia y Esgrima (LP)	Buenos Aires
21:30 UTC−3	Giménez 15'; Delgado (yellow card) 77'; Rojo (yellow card) 80'	Report	Colazo (yellow card) 31'; Mamut (yellow card) 42'; Zalazar (yellow card) 65'; Fernández (yellow card) 70'	Stadium: La Bombonera; Referee: Yael Falcón Pérez

8 December 2024 26	Newell's Old Boys	0–1	Boca Juniors	Rosario
21:00 UTC−3	Miljevic (yellow card) 18'; González (yellow card) 59'; Pérez (yellow card) 77'; Velázquez (yellow card) 82'; Banega (yellow card) 90+1'	Report	Miramón (yellow card) 9'; Zenón 54'; G. Fernández (yellow card) 72'; Zeballos (yellow card) 89'	Stadium: Marcelo Bielsa; Referee: Leandro Rey Hilfer

14 December 2024 27	Boca Juniors	0–0	Independiente	Buenos Aires
19:15 UTC−3	Delgado (yellow card) 29'; G. Fernández (yellow card) 33'	Report	Laso (yellow card) 14'; Loyola (yellow card) 33'	Stadium: La Bombonera; Referee: Nazareno Arasa

=== Copa de la Liga Profesional ===
==== Group stage ====
===== Zone 2 =====
Pos	Team	Pld	W	D	L	GF	GA	GD	Pts	Qualification
1	Godoy Cruz	14	9	2	3	16	6	+10	29	Advance to quarter-finals
2	Estudiantes (LP)	14	8	3	3	19	9	+10	27	Advance to quarter-finals
3	Defensa y Justicia	14	7	5	2	17	13	+4	26	Advance to quarter-finals
4	Boca Juniors	14	7	4	3	20	12	+8	25	Advance to quarter-finals
5	Racing	14	7	3	4	24	11	+13	24	
6	Lanús	14	7	2	5	20	14	+6	23	
7	Newell's Old Boys	14	6	3	5	13	15	−2	21	
8	Unión	14	5	5	4	16	14	+2	20	
9	Platense	14	4	6	4	10	14	−4	18	
10	San Lorenzo	14	3	7	4	10	14	−4	16	
11	Belgrano	14	3	5	6	19	21	−2	14	
12	Central Córdoba (SdE)	14	2	5	7	10	20	−10	11	
13	Sarmiento (J)	14	2	3	9	9	19	−10	9	
14	Tigre	14	1	2	11	7	25	−18	5	

Source: AFA

===== Results summary =====
Overall								Home						Away					
Pld	W	D	L	GF	GA	GD	Pts	W	D	L	GF	GA	GD	W	D	L	GF	GA	GD
14	7	4	3	20	12	+8	25	5	2	0	13	6	+7	2	2	3	7	6	+1

Source: AFA

===== Results by round =====
Team ╲ Round	1	2	3	4	5	6	7	8	9	10	12	13	11^{1}	14
Ground	A	H	A	H	H	A	A	H	A	H	A	H	A	H
Result	D	D	W	D	W	L	D	W	L	W	W	W	L	W
Position	6	8	5	7	6	7	7	5	9	5	5	4	5	4

Source: AFA
A = Away; H = Home; W = Win; D = Draw; L = Loss; P = Postponed

^{1} Matchday 11 (vs Estudiantes (LP)) was suspended on 17 March due to decompensation of Javier Altamirano, Estudiantes footballer.

====== Matches ======
Win Draw Loss Postponed

27 January 2024 1	Platense	0–0	Boca Juniors	Florida
19:00 UTC−3	Rivero (yellow card) 22'; Montenegro (yellow card) 83'	Report	Langoni (yellow card) 10'; Figal (yellow card) 50'; Campuzano (yellow card) 53'	Stadium: Ciudad de Vicente López; Referee: Leandro Rey Hilfer

1 February 2024 2	Boca Juniors	1–1	Sarmiento (J)	Buenos Aires
19:00 UTC−3	Merentiel 8'; G. Fernández (yellow card) 57'	Report	Insaurralde (yellow card) 3'; Mauri 71'	Stadium: Pedro Bidegain; Referee: Sebastián Zunino
Note: Boca Juniors played in San Lorenzo stadium due to bad conditions of the pitch of La Bombonera.

5 February 2024 3	Tigre	0–2	Boca Juniors	Victoria
19:45 UTC−3	Giacopuzzi (yellow card) 36'; Maroni (yellow card) 58'; Forclaz (yellow card) 70'	Report	Merentiel 16'; Benedetto 22'; Lema (yellow card) 42'; G. Fernández (yellow card) 71'; Figal (yellow card) 71'	Stadium: José Dellagiovanna; Referee: Fernando Echenique

10 February 2024 4	Boca Juniors	0–0	Defensa y Justicia	Buenos Aires
19:15 UTC−3		Report	Ramos Mingo (yellow card) 69'; Cannavo (yellow card) 83'	Stadium: La Bombonera; Referee: Jorge Baliño

14 February 2024 5	Boca Juniors	2–0	Central Córdoba (SdE)	Buenos Aires
19:15 UTC−3	Merentiel 7'; Bullaude (yellow card) 29'; Zenón 73'; Saracchi (yellow card) 90+1'	Report	Minissale (yellow card) 7'; García (yellow card) 36'; Garrido (yellow card) 48'	Stadium: La Bombonera; Referee: Nicolás Lamolina

18 February 2024 6	Lanús	2–1	Boca Juniors	Lanús
21:30 UTC−3	Bou 13'; Boggio (yellow card) 40'; Acosta (yellow card) 61'; Lotti 75' (yellow card) 77'; Carrera (yellow card) 89'	Report	E. Fernández (yellow card) 24'; Campuzano (yellow card) 40'; Bullaude (yellow card) 64'; Blondel 90+4'	Stadium: Ciudad de Lanús; Referee: Silvio Trucco

25 February 2024 7	River Plate	1–1	Boca Juniors	Buenos Aires
17:00 UTC−3	I. Fernández (yellow card) 19'; Solari 48'; Herrera (yellow card) 51'	Report	Figal (yellow card) 7'; Medina (yellow card) 42' (goal) 69'; Blanco (yellow card) 45'	Stadium: Monumental Antonio Vespucio Liberti; Referee: Yael Falcón Pérez

3 March 2024 8	Boca Juniors	3–2	Belgrano	Buenos Aires
19:15 UTC−3	Campuzano (yellow card) 41'; Cavani 62' (pen.), 72', 79'; Langoni (yellow card) 90+4'	Report	Passerini 20'; Campuzano (yellow card) 45'; Longo (yellow card) 59'; Marín 89'	Stadium: La Bombonera; Referee: Nazareno Arasa

6 March 2024 9	Unión	1–0	Boca Juniors	Santa Fe
19:15 UTC−3	Paz (yellow card) 7'; Balboa (yellow card) 32'; Luna Diale (yellow card) 66'; Corvalán 88'	Report	Medina (yellow card) 8'; Cavani (yellow card) 36'; Langoni (yellow card) 90'	Stadium: 15 de Abril; Referee: Fernando Rapallini

10 March 2024 10	Boca Juniors	4–2	Racing	Buenos Aires
21:30 UTC−3	Blondel 25'; Colombo 49' (o.g.); Cavani 59'; Zenón (yellow card) 63'; Valentini 80'	Report	Quintero 33' (yellow card) 84'; Martínez 46'; Zuculini (yellow card) 62'	Stadium: La Bombonera; Referee: Pablo Echavarría

30 March 2024 12	Boca Juniors	2–1	San Lorenzo	Buenos Aires
17:00 UTC−3	Lema (yellow card) 5'; Medina (yellow card) 39'; Cavani 41'; Rojo (yellow card) 61'; Merentiel 83' (yellow card) 90+3'	Report	Bareiro 8' (pen.); Braida (yellow card) 10'	Stadium: La Bombonera; Referee: Nazareno Arasa

6 April 2024 13	Newell's Old Boys	1–3	Boca Juniors	Rosario
17:00 UTC−3	Glavinovich (yellow card) 61'; J. Fernández 88'; Aguirre (yellow card) 90+5'	Report	Medina 27'; E. Fernández (yellow card) 38'; G. Fernández (yellow card) 42'; Langoni 54'; Brey (yellow card) 84'; Lema (yellow card) 89'; Zenón 89'; Briasco (yellow card) 90+4'	Stadium: Marcelo Bielsa; Referee: Facundo Tello

12 April 2024 11	Estudiantes (LP)	1–0	Boca Juniors	La Plata
19:30 UTC−3	Correa 67'	Report	Valentini (yellow card) 8'; Lema (yellow card) 22'; Blanco (yellow card) 33' (yellow-red card) 80'; G. Fernández (yellow card) 45+12'	Stadium: Jorge Luis Hirschi; Referee: Fernando Echenique
Note: Match suspended on 17 March after 27 minutes due to the decompensation of Javier Altamirano, Estudiantes footballer. The remaining 63 minutes were played on 12 April.

16 April 2024 14	Boca Juniors	1–0	Godoy Cruz	Buenos Aires
19:30 UTC−3	Medina (yellow card) 17' (yellow-red card) 30'; Cavani 39'; Rojo (yellow card) 52'	Report	Barrios (yellow card) 20'; Arce (yellow card) 77'; Ulariaga (yellow card) 86'	Stadium: La Bombonera; Referee: Leandro Rey Hilfer

==== Quarterfinals ====
21 April 2024	River Plate	2–3	Boca Juniors	Córdoba
15:30 UTC−3	Borja 9' (yellow card) 47'; Echeverri (yellow card) 39'; I. Fernández (yellow card) 45'; Colidio (yellow card) 72'; Villagra (yellow card) 78'; Solari (yellow card) 90+2'; Díaz 90+6'	Report	Merentiel (yellow card) 44' (goal) 45', 66'; Rojo (yellow card) 47'; Cavani 61' (yellow card) 70'; Blanco (yellow card) 76'; Figal (yellow card) 90+5'	Stadium: Mario Alberto Kempes; Referee: Yael Falcón Pérez

==== Semifinals ====
30 April 2024	Estudiantes (LP)	1–1 (3–1 p)	Boca Juniors	Córdoba
20:00 UTC−3	Ascacíbar (yellow card) 28'; Correa (yellow card) 50'; Cetré 75' (pen.)	Report	Lema (yellow card) 30' (yellow-red card) 72'; Merentiel 40'; G. Fernández (yellow card) 66'	Stadium: Mario Alberto Kempes; Referee: Nazareno Arasa
	Penalties
	Cetré (penalty missed); Mancuso (penalty scored); Carrillo (penalty scored); Méndez (penalty scored)		(penalty missed) Cavani; (penalty missed) Merentiel; (penalty scored) Zenón; (penalty missed) Figal

=== Copa Argentina ===
==== Round of 64 ====
23 March 2024	Boca Juniors	3–0	Central Norte	Santiago del Estero
19:30 UTC−3	Cavani 17', 56'; Anselmino (yellow card) 29'; Merentiel 74'	Report	Paparelli (yellow card) 19'; Sánchez (yellow card) 37'; Molina (yellow card) 77'	Stadium: Único Madre de Ciudades; Referee: Facundo Tello

==== Round of 32 ====
19 June 2024	Boca Juniors	2–1	Almirante Brown	Mendoza
21:10 UTC−3	E. Fernández (yellow card) 35'; Merentiel 45+2'; Cavani 52'; Zenón (yellow card) 90+2'	Report	Ibáñez (yellow card) 12'; Quiroz (yellow card) 24'; Vera 77'	Stadium: Malvinas Argentinas; Referee: Pablo Echavarría

==== Round of 16 ====
7 September 2024	Boca Juniors	1–1 (8–7 p)	Talleres (C)	Mendoza
21:10 UTC−3	Aguirre 15'; Lema (yellow card) 38'; Barinaga (yellow card) 60'; G. Fernández (yellow card) 88'	Report	Suárez (yellow card) 17'; Girotti 19'; Botta (yellow card) 30'	Stadium: Malvinas Argentinas; Referee: Andrés Merlos
	Penalties
	Zeballos (penalty scored); Giménez (penalty scored); Zenón (penalty scored); Lema (penalty scored); G. Fernández (penalty missed); Blanco (penalty scored); Saralegui (penalty scored); Medina (penalty missed); Anselmino (penalty missed); Barinaga (penalty scored); Brey (penalty scored)		(penalty scored) Tarragona; (penalty scored) Ortegoza; (penalty missed) Martínez; (penalty scored) J. Portillo; (penalty scored) Benavídez; (penalty scored) M. A. Galarza; (penalty scored) Suárez; (penalty missed) Mantilla; (penalty missed) Moyano; (penalty scored) Ruiz Rodríguez; (penalty missed) Herrera

==== Quarterfinals ====
23 October 2024	Boca Juniors	1–1 (2–1 p)	Gimnasia y Esgrima (LP)	Rosario
21:10 UTC−3	Anselmino 8'; Miramón (yellow card) 23'; G. Fernández (yellow card) 90+6'	Report	Briasco (yellow card) 3'; Morales (yellow card) 24'; Max (yellow card) 57'; Rojo 65' (o.g.) de Blasis (yellow card) 79'; Castro (yellow card) 85'	Stadium: Marcelo Bielsa; Referee: Jorge Baliño
	Penalties
	Rojo (penalty scored); Merentiel (penalty missed); Figal (penalty scored); Giménez (penalty missed)		(penalty scored) De Blasis; (penalty missed) Castillo; (penalty missed) Troyansky; (penalty missed) Morales; (penalty missed) Zalazar

==== Semifinals ====
27 November 2024	Boca Juniors	3–4	Vélez Sarsfield	Córdoba
21:10	Cavani 44'; Advíncula (yellow card) 45+1' (yellow-red card) 48'; Zeballos 70'; Belmonte 80'; Giménez (yellow card) 83'; Di Lollo (yellow card) 85'; Rojo (yellow card) 90'	Report	Pizzini 8'; Figal 20' (o.g.); Bouzat 84', 89'; B. Romero (yellow card) 93'	Stadium: Mario Alberto Kempes; Referee: Pablo Echavarría

=== Copa Sudamericana ===
==== Group stage ====
Pos	Team	Pld	W	D	L	GF	GA	GD	Pts	Qualification	FOR	BOC	NAP	TRI
1	(Brazil) Fortaleza	6	4	1	1	15	8	+7	13	Advance to round of 16	—	4–2	5–0	2–1
2	(Argentina) Boca Juniors	6	3	2	1	10	6	+4	11	Advance to knockout round play-offs	1–1	—	4–0	1–0
3	(Bolivia) Nacional Potosí	6	2	1	3	6	13	−7	7		4–1	0–0	—	2–1
4	(Paraguay) Sportivo Trinidense	6	1	0	5	5	9	−4	3		0–2	1–2	2–0	—

Source: CONMEBOL

3 April 2024 1	Nacional Potosí (Bolivia)	0–0	(Argentina) Boca Juniors	Potosí, Bolivia
20:00 UTC−4	Andía (yellow card) 25'; Prost (yellow card) 44'; Mancilla (yellow card) 45+3'; Ortíz (yellow card) 47'	Report	Saralegui (yellow card) 18'; Benedetto (penalty missed) 45+1'; Anselmino (yellow card) 70'; Brey (yellow card) 84'; Saracchi (yellow card) 86'; Molas (yellow card) 90+4'	Stadium: Estadio Víctor Agustín Ugarte; Referee: Piero Maza (Chile)

9 April 2024 2	Boca Juniors (Argentina)	1–0	(Paraguay) Sportivo Trinidense	Buenos Aires, Argentina
21:00 UTC−3	Anselmino 71'	Report	Riveros (yellow card) 27' de la Cruz (yellow card) 63'; C. Benítez (yellow card) 73'; Giménez (yellow card) 86'; Román (yellow card) 90+6'	Stadium: La Bombonera; Referee: Gustavo Tejera (Uruguay)

25 April 2024 3	Fortaleza (Brazil)	4–2	(Argentina) Boca Juniors	Fortaleza, Brazil
21:00 UTC−3	Lucero 4', 51'; Pedro Augusto (yellow card) 53'; Yago Pikachu 55', 63'; João Ricardo (yellow card) 77'; Lucas Sasha (yellow card) 81'; Renato Kayzer (yellow card) 90+6' (yellow-red card) 90+7'	Report	Merentiel (yellow card) 17' (goal) 21'; Saracchi (yellow card) 34'; Zenón 85'; G. Fernández (yellow card) 90+6'	Stadium: Castelão; Referee: Wilmar Roldán (Colombia)

8 May 2024 4	Sportivo Trinidense (Paraguay)	1–2	(Argentina) Boca Juniors	Asunción, Paraguay
20:30 UTC−4	Andrada 44' (yellow card) 45+1' (yellow-red card) 51'; Quiñonez (yellow card) 73'; Román (yellow card) 89' de la Cruz (yellow card) 90'; Jara (yellow card) 90+5'	Report	Advíncula (yellow card) 31'; Romero (yellow card) 32'; Figal 69'; Cavani 90+2'	Stadium: Estadio General Pablo Rojas; Referee: Cristian Garay (Chile)

15 May 2024 5	Boca Juniors (Argentina)	1–1	(Brazil) Fortaleza	Buenos Aires, Argentina
21:00 UTC−3	Advíncula (yellow card) 5'; Cavani (yellow card) 29' (goal) 55'; G. Fernández (yellow card) 68'; Merentiel (yellow card) 73'	Report	Kuscevic (yellow card) 37'; Titi (yellow card) 43'; Pedro Augusto (yellow card) 72'; Andrade 90'	Stadium: La Bombonera; Referee: Jesús Valenzuela (Venezuela)

29 May 2024 6	Boca Juniors (Argentina)	4–0	(Bolivia) Nacional Potosí	Buenos Aires, Argentina
21:00 UTC−3	Zenón 9'; Cavani 14'; Saracchi 19'; Rojo 53'; G. Fernández (yellow card) 56'	Report	Mancilla (yellow card) 89'	Stadium: La Bombonera; Referee: Cristian Garay (Chile)

==== Knockout round play-offs ====
17 July 2024 First leg	Independiente del Valle (Ecuador)	0–0	(Argentina) Boca Juniors	Quito, Ecuador
19:30 UTC−5	Ibarra (yellow card) 37'	Report	Advíncula (yellow card) 2'; Ramírez (yellow card) 78'	Stadium: Estadio Banco Guayaquil; Referee: Felipe González (Chile)

24 July 2024 Second leg	Boca Juniors (Argentina)	1–0 (1–0 agg.)	(Ecuador) Independiente del Valle	Buenos Aires, Argentina
21:30 UTC−3	Lema (yellow card) 34'; Cavani 39'; Delgado (red card) 61'; Advíncula (yellow card) 90+8'	Report	Schunke (yellow card) 59'; Hoyos (yellow card) 81'; Arroyo (yellow card) 90+8'	Stadium: La Bombonera; Referee: Andrés Matonte (Uruguay)

==== Round of 16 ====
15 August 2024 First leg	Boca Juniors (Argentina)	1–0	(Brazil) Cruzeiro	Buenos Aires, Argentina
21:30 UTC−3	G. Fernández (yellow card) 23'; Cavani 65'; Zeballos (yellow card) 90'	Report	Matheus Pereira (yellow card) 23'; Walace (yellow card) 29'; L. Romero (yellow card) 40'; Díaz (yellow card) 42'; Arthur Gomes (yellow card) 51'	Stadium: La Bombonera; Referee: Jesús Valenzuela (Venezuela)

22 August 2024 Second leg	Cruzeiro (Brazil)	2–1 (2–2 agg.) (5–4 p)	(Argentina) Boca Juniors	Belo Horizonte, Brazil
21:30 UTC−3	Matheus Henrique 8' (yellow card) 62'; Walace 20'; Zé Ivaldo (yellow card) 47'; Matheus Pereira (yellow card) 60'; Villalba (yellow card) 90+4'	Report	Advíncula (red card) 0'; Blanco (yellow card) 43'; Giménez 45+2' (yellow card) 81'; G. Fernández (yellow card) 51'; Zenón (yellow card) 53'; Rojo (yellow card) 88'; Medel (yellow card) 90+4'	Stadium: Mineirão; Referee: Wilmar Roldán (Colombia)
	Penalties
	William (penalty scored); Matheus Henrique (penalty scored); Marlon Xavier (penalty scored); Dinenno (penalty scored); Barreal (penalty scored)		(penalty scored) Rojo; (penalty scored) Lema; (penalty scored) Blanco; (penalty scored) Figal; (penalty missed) Merentiel

== Team statistics ==
	Total	Home	Away	Neutral
Games played	58	25	26	7
Games won	26	17	6	3
Games drawn	19	7	9	3
Games lost	13	1	11	1
Biggest win	4–0 vs Nacional Potosí	4–0 vs Nacional Potosí	2–0 vs Tigre	3–0 vs Central Norte
Biggest loss	0–3 vs Tigre		0–3 vs Tigre	3–4 vs Velez Sarsfield
Biggest win (Primera División)	3–0 vs Banfield	3–0 vs Banfield	4–2 vs Central Córdoba (SdE)	None
Biggest win (Copa de la Liga)	2–0 vs Tigre	2–0 vs Central Córdoba (SdE)	2–0 vs Tigre	3–2 vs River Plate
Biggest win (Copa Argentina)	3–0 vs Central Norte	None		3–0 vs Central Norte
Biggest win (Copa Sudamericana)	4–0 vs Nacional Potosí	4–0 vs Nacional Potosí	2–1 vs Trinidense	None
Biggest loss (Primera División)	0–3 vs Tigre		0–3 vs Tigre	None
Biggest loss (Copa de la Liga)	1–2 vs Lanús	None	1–2 vs Lanús	None
Biggest loss (Copa Argentina)	None			3–4 vs Velez Sarsfield
Biggest loss (Copa Sudamericana)	2–4 vs Fortaleza	None	2–4 vs Fortaleza	None
Clean sheets	23	15	7	1
Goals scored	77	38	24	14
Goals conceded	53	14	29	10
Goal difference	+24	+24	-5	+4
Yellow cards	164	57	86	21
Red cards	8	5	2	1
Top scorer	Cavani (20)	Cavani (14)	Merentiel (6)	Merentiel; Cavani (5)
Penalties for		1		
Penalties against	2	1		1

=== Season Appearances and goals ===
As of 15 December 2024

No.	Pos	Nat	Player	Total		Primera División		Copa de la Liga		Copa Argentina		Copa Sudamericana	
No.	Pos	Nat	Player	Apps	Goals	Apps	Goals	Apps	Goals	Apps	Goals	Apps	Goals
Goalkeepers
1	GK	(Argentina) ARG	Sergio Romero	39	-35	16	-15	12+1	-11	1	-1	9	-8
12	GK	(Argentina) ARG	Leandro Brey	21	-16	11+1	-8	3+1	-2	4	-6	1	0
13	GK	(Argentina) ARG	Javier García	1	-2	0	0	1	-2	0	0	0	0
Defenders
2	DF	(Argentina) ARG	Cristian Lema	34	1	9	1	15	0	2+1	0	7	0
3	DF	(Uruguay) URU	Marcelo Saracchi	25	3	9+4	2	2+2	0	1+2	0	4+1	1
4	DF	(Argentina) ARG	Nicolás Figal	33	1	12+2	0	8+3	0	2+1	0	4+1	1
6	DF	(Argentina) ARG	Marcos Rojo	30	1	12+4	0	5+1	0	4	0	4	1
15	DF	(Argentina) ARG	Nicolás Valentini	9	1	0	0	4+3	1	0	0	2	0
17	DF	(Peru) PER	Luis Advíncula	44	0	16+2	0	14+2	0	2	0	6+2	0
18	DF	(Colombia) COL	Frank Fabra	16	0	3+4	0	2+3	0	0	0	1+3	0
23	DF	(Argentina) ARG	Lautaro Blanco	46	0	18+3	0	13+1	0	3	0	7+1	0
24	DF	(Argentina) ARG	Juan Barinaga	10	0	6+2	0	0	0	1+1	0	0	0
34	DF	(Argentina) ARG	Mateo Mendia	4	0	1+2	0	0	0	0	0	0+1	0
38	DF	(Argentina) ARG	Aaron Anselmino	18	2	10+2	0	0+1	0	3	1	2	1
40	DF	(Argentina) ARG	Lautaro Di Lollo	21	0	10+2	0	0	0	0+2	0	3+4	0
42	DF	(Argentina) ARG	Lucas Blondel	10	2	0	0	6+3	2	1	0	0	0
48	DF	(Argentina) ARG	Dylan Gorosito	1	0	1	0	0	0	0	0	0	0
52	DF	(Argentina) ARG	Walter Molas	2	0	0+1	0	0	0	0	0	0+1	0
Midfielders
5	MF	(Chile) CHI	Gary Medel	11	0	6+3	0	0	0	0	0	1+1	0
8	MF	(Argentina) ARG	Guillermo Fernández	45	0	18+4	0	9+2	0	3+1	0	7+1	0
19	MF	(Argentina) ARG	Agustín Martegani	11	0	4+4	0	0	0	1	0	1+1	0
20	MF	(Argentina) ARG	Juan Ramírez	4	0	0	0	1+1	0	0	0	1+1	0
21	MF	(Argentina) ARG	Ignacio Miramón	17	0	11+4	0	0	0	2	0	0	0
22	MF	(Argentina) ARG	Kevin Zenón	46	6	17+1	2	15+1	2	4+1	0	5+2	2
30	MF	(Argentina) ARG	Tomás Belmonte	20	1	14+2	0	0	0	2	1	0+2	0
36	MF	(Argentina) ARG	Cristian Medina	30	3	11+1	1	10	2	2	0	6	0
43	MF	(Argentina) ARG	Milton Delgado	17	0	4+7	0	0	0	0+2	0	2+2	0
45	MF	(Argentina) ARG	Mauricio Benítez	11	0	0	0	3+2	0	0+1	0	3+2	0
47	MF	(Argentina) ARG	Jabes Saralegui	38	1	2+13	1	5+8	0	1+1	0	6+2	0
50	MF	(Argentina) ARG	Julian Ceballos	5	0	1+1	0	0	0	0+1	0	2	0
51	MF	(Argentina) ARG	Santiago Dalmasso	2	0	0+1	0	0	0	0	0	0+1	0
53	MF	(Argentina) ARG	Joaquín Ruiz	2	0	0+2	0	0	0	0	0	0	0
Forwards
7	FW	(Argentina) ARG	Exequiel Zeballos	25	2	11+9	1	0	0	2+1	1	0+2	0
9	FW	(Argentina) ARG	Milton Giménez	25	7	9+11	6	0	0	1+2	0	1+1	1
10	FW	(Uruguay) URU	Edinson Cavani	39	20	16+1	4	10+2	7	4	4	6	5
11	FW	(Argentina) ARG	Lucas Janson	22	0	2+8	0	2+6	0	0	0	3+1	0
16	FW	(Uruguay) URU	Miguel Merentiel	49	17	19+3	7	13+3	7	3	2	8	1
33	FW	(Argentina) ARG	Brian Aguirre	18	3	11+5	2	0	0	2	1	0	0
39	FW	(Argentina) ARG	Vicente Taborda	6	0	1+1	0	0+2	0	1	0	1	0
41	FW	(Argentina) ARG	Iker Zufiaurre	3	0	0+1	0	0	0	0	0	0+2	0
Players who have made an appearance or had a squad number this season, but have left the club
19	DF	(Argentina) ARG	Valentín Barco	0	0	0	0	0	0	0	0	0	0
25	DF	(Paraguay) PAR	Bruno Valdez	0	0	0	0	0	0	0	0	0	0
57	DF	(Argentina) ARG	Marcelo Weigandt	0	0	0	0	0	0	0	0	0	0
5	MF	(Argentina) ARG	Ezequiel Bullaude	6	0	0	0	2+3	0	0	0	0+1	0
21	MF	(Argentina) ARG	Ezequiel Fernández	19	2	4	2	7+1	0	2	0	4+1	0
49	MF	(Colombia) COL	Jorman Campuzano	12	0	0+1	0	7+3	0	0	0	0+1	0
9	FW	(Argentina) ARG	Darío Benedetto	13	1	0	0	2+8	1	0+1	0	1+1	0
14	FW	(Argentina) ARG	Luca Langoni	25	1	2+1	0	6+9	1	0+2	0	1+4	0
29	FW	(Armenia) ARM	Norberto Briasco	6	0	0+1	0	0+3	0	0	0	1+1	0

=== Top scorers ===
As of 15 December 2024

Rank	Pos.	No.	Player	Primera División	Copa de la Liga	Copa Argentina	Copa Sudamericana	Total
1	FW	10	(Uruguay) Edinson Cavani	4	7	4	5	20
2	FW	16	(Uruguay) Miguel Merentiel	7	7	2	1	17
3	FW	9	(Argentina) Milton Giménez	6			1	7
4	MF	22	(Argentina) Kevin Zenón	2	2		2	6
5	MF	36	(Argentina) Cristian Medina	1	2			3
6	DF	3	(Argentina) Marcelo Saracchi	2			1	3
7	FW	33	(Argentina) Brian Aguirre	2		1		3
8	FW	7	(Argentina) Exequiel Zeballos	1		1		2
9	MF	21	(Argentina) Ezequiel Fernández	2				2
10	DF	42	(Argentina) Lucas Blondel		2			2
11	DF	38	(Argentina) Aaron Anselmino			1	1	2
12	FW	9	(Argentina) Darío Benedetto		1			1
13	DF	15	(Argentina) Nicolás Valentini		1			1
14	FW	14	(Argentina) Luca Langoni		1			1
15	DF	4	(Argentina) Nicolás Figal				1	1
16	DF	6	(Argentina) Marcos Rojo				1	1
17	MF	47	(Argentina) Jabes Saralegui	1				1
18	DF	2	(Argentina) Cristian Lema	1				1
18	MF	30	(Argentina) Tomás Belmonte			1		1
Own goals				1	1			2
Totals				30	24	10	13	77

=== Top assists ===
As of 15 December 2024

Rank	Pos.	No.	Player	Primera División	Copa de la Liga	Copa Argentina	Copa Sudamericana	Total
1	DF	23	(Argentina) Lautaro Blanco	1	3	1	3	8
2	MF	22	(Argentina) Kevin Zenón	1	4		2	7
3	DF	17	(Peru) Luis Advíncula	2	4	1		7
4	FW	16	(Uruguay) Miguel Merentiel	3	1	2		6
5	FW	14	(Argentina) Luca Langoni		1	1	1	3
6	DF	38	(Argentina) Aaron Anselmino	3				3
7	MF	36	(Argentina) Cristian Medina	1	1	1		3
8	DF	3	(Argentina) Marcelo Saracchi	1		1	1	3
9	FW	7	(Argentina) Exequiel Zeballos	3				3
10	FW	10	(Uruguay) Edinson Cavani	1		1		1
11	DF	18	(Colombia) Frank Fabra		1			1
12	FW	29	(Armenia) Norberto Briasco				1	1
13	MF	21	(Argentina) Ezequiel Fernández	1				1
14	MF	8	(Argentina) Guillermo Fernández	1				1
15	FW	33	(Argentina) Brian Aguirre	1				1
16	FW	9	(Argentina) Milton Giménez	1				1
17	DF	2	(Argentina) Cristian Lema				1	1
18	DF	24	(Argentina) Juan Barinaga			1		1
Totals				18	15	9	10	52

=== Clean sheets ===
As of 15 December 2024

Rank	Pos.	No.	Player	Primera División	Copa de la Liga	Copa Argentina	Copa Sudamericana	Total
1	GK	1	(Argentina) Sergio Romero	6	4		5	15
1	GK	12	(Argentina) Leandro Brey	6	2	1	1	10
Totals				12	6	1	6	25

=== Penalties ===
Date	Penalty Taker	Scored	Opponent	Competition
3 March 2024	Edinson Cavani	Yes	Belgrano	Copa de la Liga Profesional
3 April 2024	Darío Benedetto	No	Nacional Potosí	Copa Sudamericana

=== Disciplinary record ===
As of 10 December 2024

No.	Pos	Nat	Player	Primera División			Copa de la Liga			Copa Argentina			Copa Sudamericana			Total		
No.	Pos	Nat	Player	Booked	(yellow card) (yellow-red card)	Sent off (straight red)	Booked	(yellow card) (yellow-red card)	Sent off (straight red)	Booked	(yellow card) (yellow-red card)	Sent off (straight red)	Booked	(yellow card) (yellow-red card)	Sent off (straight red)	Booked	(yellow card) (yellow-red card)	Sent off (straight red)
Goalkeepers
1	GK	(Argentina)	Sergio Romero	1									1			2		
12	GK	(Argentina)	Leandro Brey				1						1			2		
13	GK	(Argentina)	Javier García															
Defenders
2	DF	(Argentina)	Cristian Lema	4	1		4	1		1			1			10	2	
3	DF	(Uruguay)	Marcelo Saracchi	1	1		1						2			4	1	
4	DF	(Argentina)	Nicolás Figal	7			4									11		
6	DF	(Argentina)	Marcos Rojo	4	1		3			1			1			9	1	
15	DF	(Argentina)	Nicolás Valentini				1									1		
17	DF	(Peru)	Luis Advíncula	2							1		4		1	6	1	1
18	DF	(Colombia)	Frank Fabra	1												1		
23	DF	(Argentina)	Lautaro Blanco	5			2	1					1			8	1	
24	DF	(Argentina)	Juan Barinaga	2						1						3		
38	DF	(Argentina)	Aaron Anselmino	1						1			1			3		
40	DF	(Argentina)	Lautaro Di Lollo	2						1						3		
42	DF	(Argentina)	Lucas Blondel															
48	DF	(Argentina)	Dylan Gorosito	1												1		
52	DF	(Argentina)	Walter Molas										1			1		
Midfielders
5	MF	(Chile)	Gary Medel	5									1			6		
8	MF	(Argentina)	Guillermo Fernández	10		1	5			2			5			22		1
19	MF	(Argentina)	Agustín Martegani															
20	MF	(Argentina)	Juan Ramírez										1			1		
21	MF	(Argentina)	Ignacio Miramón	3						1						4		
22	MF	(Argentina)	Kevin Zenón	1			1			1			1			4		
30	MF	(Argentina)	Tomás Belmonte	3												3		
36	MF	(Argentina)	Cristian Medina	2			3	1								5	1	
43	MF	(Argentina)	Milton Delgado	2											1	2		1
45	MF	(Argentina)	Mauricio Benítez															
47	MF	(Argentina)	Jabes Saralegui										1			1		
Forwards
7	FW	(Argentina)	Exequiel Zeballos	2									1			3		
9	FW	(Argentina)	Milton Giménez	2	1					1			1			4	1	
10	FW	(Uruguay)	Edinson Cavani	2		1	2						1			5		1
11	FW	(Argentina)	Lucas Janson	1												1		
16	FW	(Uruguay)	Miguel Merentiel	4			2						2			8		
33	FW	(Argentina)	Brian Aguirre	1												1		
39	FW	(Argentina)	Vicente Taborda															
41	FW	(Argentina)	Iker Zufiaurre															
Players who have made an appearance or had a squad number this season, but have left the club
19	DF	(Argentina)	Valentín Barco															
25	DF	(Paraguay)	Bruno Valdez															
57	DF	(Argentina)	Marcelo Weigandt															
5	MF	(Argentina)	Ezequiel Bullaude				2									2		
21	MF	(Argentina)	Ezequiel Fernández	2			2			1						5		
49	MF	(Colombia)	Jorman Campuzano				3									3		
9	FW	(Argentina)	Darío Benedetto															
14	FW	(Argentina)	Luca Langoni				3									3		
29	FW	(Armenia)	Norberto Briasco				1									1		
Total				71	4	2	40	3		11	1		27		2	149	8	4
