= 2025 Godoy Cruz Antonio Tomba season =

Godoy Cruz Antonio Tomba
2025 season
- Manager: Esteban Solari (until 9 August); Walter Ribonetto (from 9 August)
- Stadium: Estadio Malvinas Argentinas
- Primera División: 9th (Apertura); 14th (Clausura)
- Copa Argentina: Round of 64
- Copa Sudamericana: Round of 16
Home colours	Away colours	Third colours

The 2025 season is the 104th for Club Deportivo Godoy Cruz Antonio Tomba and their 11th consecutive season in the Primera División. The club will also compete in the Copa Argentina and Copa Sudamericana.

== Squad ==
=== Players ===
As of 1 February 2025.

Note: Flags indicate national team as defined under FIFA eligibility rules; some limited exceptions apply. Players may hold more than one non-FIFA nationality.

No.	Pos.	Nation	Player
1	GK	ARG	Franco Petroli
2	DF	ARG	Tomás Rossi
3	DF	ARG	Juan Morán
4	DF	ARG	Lucas Arce
5	MF	ARG	Bruno Leyes
6	DF	ARG	Leandro Quiroz
7	FW	ARG	Bautista Cejas
8	MF	ARG	Agustín Valverde
9	FW	ARG	Nahuel Ulariaga
10	MF	ARG	Tomás Pozzo
11	FW	ARG	Daniel Barrea
12	GK	ARG	Roberto Ramírez
13	MF	URU	Nicolás Fernández
16	MF	ARG	Mariano Santiago
17	FW	ARG	Matías González

No.	Pos.	Nation	Player
20	FW	PAR	Kevin Parzajuk
21	DF	ARG	Andrés Meli
22	FW	ARG	Martín Pino
23	DF	ARG	Federico Rasmussen
24	FW	CHI	Bastián Yáñez
25	MF	URU	Vicente Poggi
27	MF	ARG	Santino Andino
29	DF	ARG	Leonardo Jara
30	DF	ARG	Facundo Ardiles
31	FW	ARG	Agustín Auzmendi
32	MF	ARG	Gonzalo Abrego
40	GK	ARG	Edilson Salinas
41	FW	ARG	Facundo Altamira
50	MF	COL	Juan José Pérez
77	FW	MEX	Luca Martínez

=== Transfers In ===
Pos.	Player	Transferred from	Fee	Date	Source
FW	(Mexico) Luca Martínez	(Argentina) Rosario Central	Undisclosed	2 February 2025	
MF	(Argentina) Pol Fernández	(Brazil) Fortaleza	Free	27 June 2025	
MF	(Argentina) Maximiliano González	(Argentina) Lanús	Loan	17 July 2025	
GK	(Argentina) Nicolás Claa	(Argentina) Lanús	Loan	17 July 2025	
DF	(Uruguay) Gastón Silva	(Uruguay) Peñarol	Free	23 July 2025	
DF	(Paraguay) Juan Escobar	(Spain) CD Castellón	Free	24 July 2025	

=== Transfers Out ===
Pos.	Player	Transferred to	Fee	Date	Source
FW	(Uruguay) Salomón Rodríguez	(Chile) Colo-Colo	€2,000,000	14 January 2025	
FW	(Colombia) Juan José Pérez	(Argentina) Gimnasia y Esgrima	Undisclosed	7 July 2025	

== Exhibition matches ==
11 January 2025	Club Universidad de Chile	4–1	(Argentina) Godoy Cruz

14 January 2025	Coquimbo Unido (Chile)	1–2	(Argentina) Godoy Cruz

== Competitions ==
=== Overall record ===
Competition	First match	Last match	Starting round	Final position	Record							
Competition	First match	Last match	Starting round	Final position	Pld	W	D	L	GF	GA	GD	Win %
Primera División	23 January 2025		Matchday 1		12	2	7	3	7	14	−7	16.67
Copa Argentina	27 February 2025	27 February 2025	Round of 64	Round of 64	1	0	0	1	0	1	−1	0.00
Copa Sudamericana	2 April 2025		Group stage		2	2	0	0	4	0	+4	100.00
Total					15	4	7	4	11	15	−4	26.67

Source: Competitions

=== Primera División ===
==== Torneo Aperatura ====
===== League table =====
Pos	Team	Pld	W	D	L	GF	GA	GD	Pts	Qualification
7	Lanús	16	4	8	4	13	11	+2	20	Advance to round of 16
8	Instituto	16	5	3	8	16	20	−4	18	Advance to round of 16
9	Godoy Cruz	16	3	8	5	8	18	−10	17	
10	Atlético Tucumán	16	5	1	10	17	21	−4	16	
11	Gimnasia y Esgrima (LP)	16	4	4	8	9	18	−9	16	

Source: AFA

===== Results by round =====
Round	1
Ground	H
Result	
Position	

A = Away; H = Home; W = Win; D = Draw; L = Loss

===== Matches =====
23 January 2025 1	Godoy Cruz	0–3	Rosario Central	Mendoza
19:00 UTC−3		Report	Copetti 18'; Malcorra 26'; Campaz 48'	Stadium: Estadio Víctor Legrotaglie

28 January 2025 2	Sarmiento	0–0	Godoy Cruz	Junín
19:15 UTC−3		Report		Stadium: Estadio Eva Perón

9 February 2025 4	Gimnasia y Esgrima	3–0	Godoy Cruz	La Plata
19:15 UTC−3	Morales 22'; Castillo 63', 75'	Report		Stadium: Estadio Juan Carmelo Zerillo

12 February 2025 5	Godoy Cruz	0–0	River Plate	Mendoza
22:15 UTC−3		Report		Stadium: Estadio Malvinas Argentinas; Referee: Pablo Echavarría

17 February 2025 6	Vélez Sarsfield	0–2	Godoy Cruz	Buenos Aires
21:30 UTC−3		Report	Pizzini 18' (o.g.); Altamira 28'	Stadium: José Amalfitani Stadium

21 February 2025 7	Godoy Cruz	1–1	Platense	Mendoza
19:15 UTC−3	Cozzani 67' (o.g.)	Report	Taborda 38'	Stadium: Estadio Malvinas Argentinas

3 March 2025 8	Barracas Central	1–2	Godoy Cruz	Sarandí
17:00 UTC−3	Bruera 51'	Report	Martínez 26', 90'	Stadium: Estadio Julio Humberto Grondona

9 March 2025 9	Instituto	1–1	Godoy Cruz	Córdoba
21:30 UTC−3	Batallini 42'	Report	Andino 37'	Stadium: Estadio Juan Domingo Perón

14 March 2025 10	Godoy Cruz	0–0	San Lorenzo	Mendoza
21:00 UTC−3		Report		Stadium: Estadio Malvinas Argentinas

22 March 2025 3	Godoy Cruz	0–0	Talleres	Mendoza
17:00 UTC−3		Report		Stadium: Estadio Víctor Legrotaglie

29 March 2025 11	Independiente	4–0	Godoy Cruz	Córdoba
18:45 UTC−3	Loyola 2', 18'; Arce 25' (o.g.); Ávalos 35'	Report		Stadium: Estadio Juan Domingo Perón

5 April 2025 12	Godoy Cruz	1–1	Independiente Rivadavia	Mendoza
15:30 UTC−3	Andino 45+1'	Report	Villalba 74'	Stadium: Estadio Malvinas Argentinas

14 April 2025 13	Godoy Cruz	0–0	Lanús	Mendoza
21:15 UTC−3		Report		Stadium: Estadio Malvinas Argentinas

20 April 2025 14	San Martín	1–0	Godoy Cruz	San Juan
18:45 UTC−3	Toloza 33'	Report		Stadium: Estadio Ingeniero Hilario Sánchez

28 April 2025 15	Godoy Cruz	1–0	Atlético Tucumán	Mendoza
17:15 UTC−3	Auzmendi 36'	Report		Stadium: Estadio Malvinas Argentinas

3 May 2025 16	Deportivo Riestra	3–0	Godoy Cruz	Buenos Aires
16:00 UTC−3	Alonso 36'; Céliz 62'; Guille 83'	Report		Stadium: Estadio Guillermo Laza

==== Torneo Clausura ====
===== League table =====
Pos	Team	Pld	W	D	L	GF	GA	GD	Pts
11	Independiente	16	4	6	6	14	13	+1	18
12	Atlético Tucumán	16	5	3	8	17	22	−5	18
13	Instituto	16	3	7	6	9	17	−8	16
14	Godoy Cruz	16	1	9	6	11	19	−8	12
15	Platense	16	2	6	8	12	25	−13	12

Source: AFA

===== Matches =====
12 July 2025 1	Rosario Central	1–1	Godoy Cruz	Rosario
16:00 UTC−3	Di María 78' (pen.)	Report	Poggi 90+5'	Stadium: Estadio Gigante de Arroyito

19 July 2025 2	Godoy Cruz	0–0	Sarmiento	Godoy Cruz
18:45 UTC−3		Report		Stadium: Estadio Feliciano Gambarte

27 July 2025 3	Talleres	0–0	Godoy Cruz	Córdoba
16:00 UTC−3		Report		Stadium: Estadio Mario Alberto Kempes

7 August 2025 4	Godoy Cruz	1–2	Gimnasia y Esgrima	Godoy Cruz
17:00 UTC−3	Auzmendi 90+1'	Report	Panaro 27'; Torres 30'	Stadium: Estadio Feliciano Gambarte

17 August 2025 5	River Plate	4–2	Godoy Cruz	Buenos Aires
19:30 (UTC−3)	Driussi 4', 49'; Galoppo 19', 45+5'	Report	Auzmendi 9', 29' (pen.)	Stadium: Estadio Monumental; Referee: Sebastián Zunino

25 August 2025 6	Godoy Cruz	0–2	Vélez Sarsfield	Godoy Cruz
17:00 UTC−3		Report	Mendoza 23' (o.g.); Carrizo 31'	Stadium: Estadio Feliciano Gambarte

=== Copa Argentina ===
27 February 2025 Round of 64	Godoy Cruz	0–1	Excursionistas	Córdoba, Pcia. de Córdoba
19:10		Report	Vera 50'	Stadium: El Gigante de Alberdi; Referee: Felipe Viola

=== Copa Sudamericana ===
==== Group stage ====
The draw for the group stage was held on 17 March 2025, 20:00 UTC−03:00, at the CONMEBOL Convention Centre in Luque, Paraguay.

Pos	Team	Pld	W	D	L	GF	GA	GD	Pts	Qualification	GOD	GRE	CAG	SLU
1	(Argentina) Godoy Cruz	6	3	3	0	10	5	+5	12	Advance to round of 16	—	2–2	2–2	2–0
2	(Brazil) Grêmio	6	3	3	0	8	4	+4	12	Advance to knockout round play-offs	1–1	—	2–0	1–0
3	(Peru) Atlético Grau	6	0	4	2	5	9	−4	4		0–2	0–0	—	2–2
4	(Paraguay) Sportivo Luqueño	6	0	2	4	4	9	−5	2		0–1	1–2	1–1	—

Source: CONMEBOL
Rules for classification: 1) Points; 2) Goal difference; 3) Goals scored; 4) Away goals scored; 5) CONMEBOL ranking.

2 April 2025 1	Atlético Grau (Peru)	0–2	(Argentina) Godoy Cruz	Lima, Peru
21:00 UTC−5		Report	Mendoza 19'; Fernández 55'	Stadium: Estadio Alejandro Villanueva (Note: Atlético Grau play their home matches at Estadio Alejandro Villanueva, Lima instead of their regular stadium Estadio Miguel Grau, Piura which has been abandoned for years.); Attendance: 535; Referee: Guillermo Guerrero (Ecuador)

8 April 2025 2	Godoy Cruz (Argentina)	2–0	(Paraguay) Sportivo Luqueño	Mendoza, Argentina
21:30 UTC−3	Mendoza 29'; Pascual 90+3'	Report		Stadium: Estadio Malvinas Argentinas; Referee: Augusto Aragón (Ecuador)

24 April 2025 3	Godoy Cruz (Argentina)	2–2	(Brazil) Grêmio	Mendoza, Argentina
19:00 UTC−3	Auzmendi 63'; Martínez Dupuy 86'	Report	Edenilson 34'; Aravena 81'	Stadium: Estadio Malvinas Argentinas; Referee: Francisco Gilabert (Chile)

6 May 2025 4	Sportivo Luqueño (Paraguay)	0–1	(Argentina) Godoy Cruz	Asunción, Paraguay
19:00 UTC−3		Report	Auzmendi 72'	Stadium: Estadio La Huerta (Note: Sportivo Luqueño played their home match against Godoy Cruz at Estadio La Huerta, Asunción instead of the originally scheduled Estadio Defensores del Chaco, Asunción.); Referee: Bryan Loayza (Ecuador)

13 May 2025 5	Grêmio (Brazil)	1–1	(Argentina) Godoy Cruz	Porto Alegre, Brazil
19:00 UTC−3	João Pedro 6'	Report	Andino 29'	Stadium: Arena do Grêmio; Referee: Diego Ulloa (Colombia)

29 May 2025 6	Godoy Cruz (Argentina)	2–2	(Peru) Atlético Grau	Mendoza, Argentina
19:00 UTC−3	Auzmendi 48'; Martínez Dupuy 76'	Report	Bandiera 64'; Vilca 73'	Stadium: Estadio Malvinas Argentinas; Referee: Javier Revollo (Bolivia)

==== Final stages ====
The draw for the round of 16 was held on 2 June 2025, 12:00 PYT (UTC−3) at the CONMEBOL headquarters in Luque, Paraguay.

===== Round of 16 =====
14 August First leg	Atlético Mineiro (Brazil)	2–1	(Argentina) Godoy Cruz	Belo Horizonte, Brazil
19:00 UTC−3	Cuello 67'; Hulk 89'	Report	Andino 37'	Stadium: Arena MRV; Attendance: 23,247; Referee: Alexis Herrera (Venezuela)

21 August Second leg	Godoy Cruz (Argentina)	0–1 (1–3 agg.)	(Brazil) Atlético Mineiro	Mendoza, Argentina
19:00 UTC−3		Report	Natanael 48'	Stadium: Estadio Malvinas Argentinas; Attendance: 5,569; Referee: Felipe González (Chile)
