= Pablo Peña =

Argentine professional footballer

Personal information
- Full name: Pablo César Peña
- Date of birth: 30 January 1999 (age 27)
- Place of birth: Argentina
- Height: 1.70 m (5 ft 7 in)
- Position: Right-back

Youth career
- Godoy Cruz

Senior career*
Years	Team	Apps	(Gls)
2020–2021	Godoy Cruz	1	(0)
2021	FC Kalundborg		
- * Club domestic league appearances and goals as of 23:17, 27 December 2020 (UTC)

Pablo César Peña (born 30 January 1999) is an Argentine professional footballer who plays as a right-back.

== Career ==
Peña is a product of the Godoy Cruz youth system. On 29 May 2018, the right-back signed his first professional contract with the club. Peña was promoted into the first-team squad of manager Diego Martínez in December 2020, with his senior debut subsequently arriving on 27 December during a 6–1 loss away to Racing Club in the Copa de la Liga Profesional; featuring for the full duration.

In the summer 2021, Peña began playing for Danish amateur club FC Kalundborg.

== Career statistics ==
As of 27 December 2020.

Appearances and goals by club, season and competition
Club	Season	League			Cup		League Cup		Continental		Other		Total	
Club	Season	Division	Apps	Goals	Apps	Goals	Apps	Goals	Apps	Goals	Apps	Goals	Apps	Goals
Godoy Cruz	2020–21 (Note: Soccerway counts Copa de la Liga Profesional appearances as league appearances.)	Primera División	1	0	0	0	0	0	—		0	0	1	0
Career total			1	0	0	0	0	0	—		0	0	1	0
