= Aarón Anselmino =

Argentine footballer (born 2005)

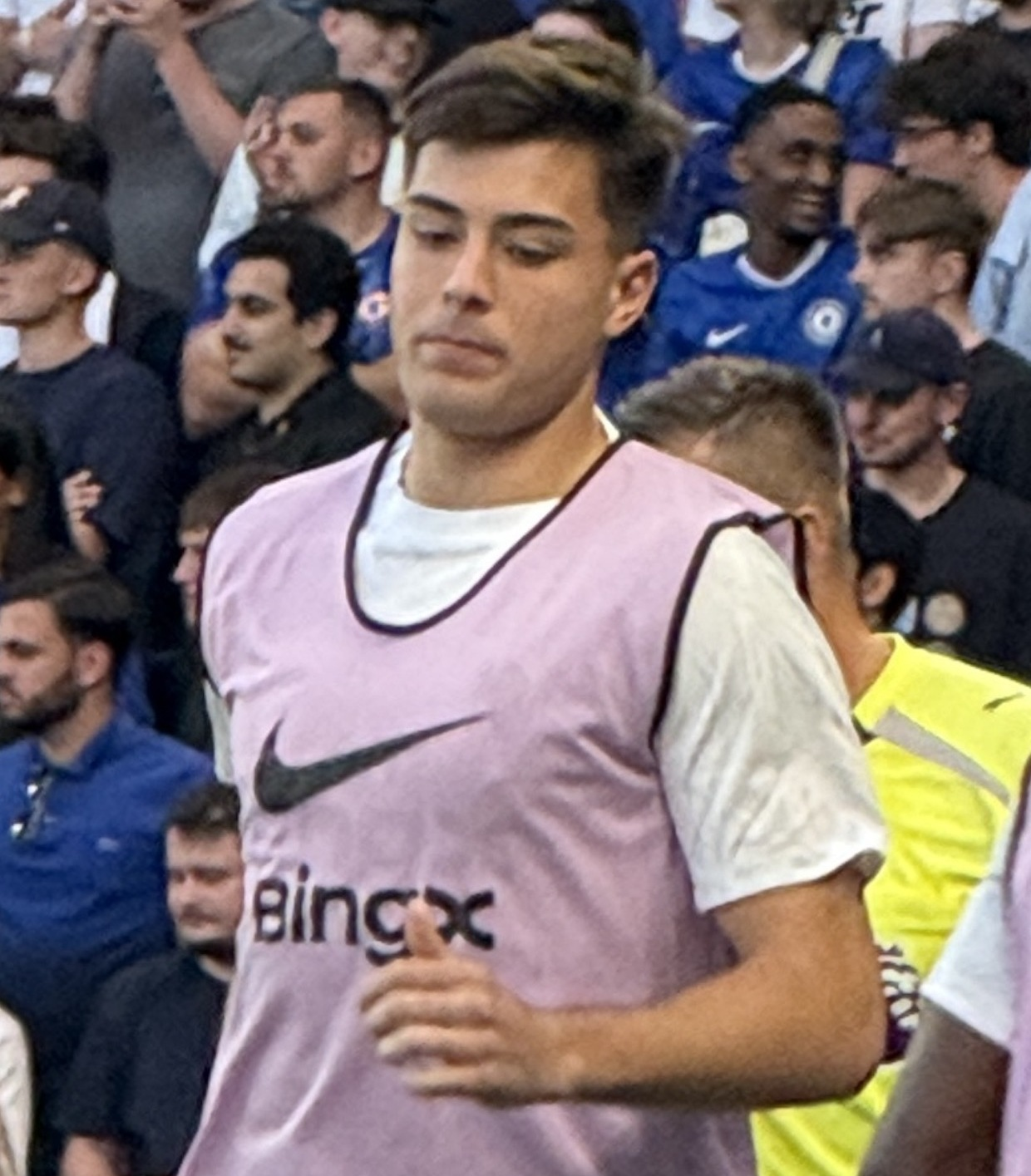
- Anselmino with Chelsea in 2025

Personal information
- Date of birth: 29 April 2005 (age 21)
- Place of birth: Bernardo Larroudé, Argentina
- Height: 1.86 m (6 ft 1 in)
- Position: Centre-back

Team information
- Current team: Chelsea
- Number: 30

Youth career
- Juventud Unida
- Sportivo Realicó
- 2017–2023: Boca Juniors

Senior career*
| Years | Team | Apps | (Gls) |
| 2023–2024 | Boca Juniors | 7 | (0) |
| 2024– | Chelsea | 0 | (0) |
| 2024–2025 | → Boca Juniors (loan) | 11 | (0) |
| 2025–2026 | → Borussia Dortmund (loan) | 6 | (1) |
| 2026 | → Strasbourg (loan) | 3 | (0) |

International career^{‡}
| 2025– | Argentina U20 | 2 | (0) |
| 2026– | Argentina | 1 | (0) |
- * Club domestic league appearances and goals as of 19:02, 4 April 2026 (UTC) ‡ National team caps and goals as of 23:45, 17 November 2026 (UTC)

Aarón Anselmino (born 29 April 2005) is an Argentine professional footballer who plays as a centre-back for Premier League club Chelsea and the Argentina national team.

== Early life ==
Anselmino joined the youth academy of Argentine side Boca Juniors at the age of twelve.

== Club career ==
=== Boca Juniors ===
In 2022, Anselmino was crowned champion of the 2022 Evo Cup with Boca Juniors after beating River Plate 2–0 in the final. He was a participant in the first edition of the Evo Cup, a youth competition that was played in Bolivia. This tournament was created in tribute to the former Bolivia president, Evo Morales. The team that was led by Matías Donett won 2–0 with goals from Diego Santander and Iker Zufiaurre.

On 10 June 2023, Anselmino signed his first professional contract with Boca Juniors and hours later made his debut with the club as a second-half substitute for Bruno Valdez, in a match that ended in a 1–1 draw against Lanús. Almost six months later, on 9 January 2024, Anselmino signed a contract extension which runs until December 2028.

=== Chelsea ===
On 8 August 2024, Anselmino signed for Premier League club Chelsea on a seven-year contract for a reported fee of £15.6 million, remaining with Boca Juniors on a twelve-month loan deal. In December 2024 it was announced that Anselmino would return to Chelsea in January 2025. He was recalled from loan on 3 January 2025. On 28 June 2025, Anselmino made his Chelsea debut in a 4–1 win against Benfica in the round of 16 of the 2025 FIFA Club World Cup, coming on as a substitute in the final minutes of extra time.

==== Loan to Borussia Dortmund ====
On 27 August 2025, Anselmino signed for Bundesliga club Borussia Dortmund on a season long loan deal. Later that year, on 29 November, he netted his first goal in a 2–1 away victory over Bayer Leverkusen. He was recalled by Chelsea on 26 January 2026.

==== Loan to Strasbourg ====
On 2 February 2026, Anselmino signed for Ligue 1 club Strasbourg on loan for the remainder of the season.

== International career ==
Anselmino made his Argentina national team debut on 17 November 2026 in a friendly against Costa Rica.

== Style of play ==
Anselmino mainly operates as a central defender and has been described as a "tower that clears everything head-on and almost always prevails in one-on-one situations".

== Personal life ==
Anselmino is a native of Bernardo Larroudé, Argentina.

== Career statistics ==
=== Club ===
As of match played 4 April 2026

Appearances and goals by club, season and competition
| Club | Season | League | | | National cup (Note: Includes Copa Argentina, DFB-Pokal) | | League cup | | Continental | | Other | | Total | |
| Club | Season | Division | Apps | Goals | Apps | Goals | Apps | Goals | Apps | Goals | Apps | Goals | Apps | Goals |
|---|---|---|---|---|---|---|---|---|---|---|---|---|---|---|
| Boca Juniors | 2023 | Argentine Primera División | 5 | 0 | 0 | 0 | 0 | 0 | 0 | 0 | 0 | 0 | 5 | 0 |
| Boca Juniors | 2024 | Argentine Primera División | 2 | 0 | 1 | 0 | 0 | 0 | 2 (Note: Appearances in Copa Sudamericana) | 1 | – | | 5 | 1 |
| Boca Juniors | Total | | 7 | 0 | 1 | 0 | 0 | 0 | 2 | 1 | 0 | 0 | 10 | 1 |
| Chelsea | 2024–25 | Premier League | 0 | 0 | 0 | 0 | — | | 0 | 0 | 1 (Note: Appearance in FIFA Club World Cup) | 0 | 1 | 0 |
| Chelsea | 2025–26 | Premier League | 0 | 0 | — | | — | | — | | — | | 0 | 0 |
| Chelsea | 2026–27 | Premier League | 0 | 0 | 0 | 0 | 0 | 0 | — | | — | | 0 | 0 |
| Chelsea | Total | | 0 | 0 | 0 | 0 | 0 | 0 | 0 | 0 | 1 | 0 | 1 | 0 |
| Boca Juniors (loan) | 2024 | Argentine Primera División | 11 | 0 | 2 | 1 | — | | 0 | 0 | – | | 13 | 1 |
| Borussia Dortmund (loan) | 2025–26 | Bundesliga | 6 | 1 | 1 | 0 | – | | 3 (Note: Appearances in UEFA Champions League) | 0 | – | | 10 | 1 |
| Strasbourg (loan) | 2025–26 | Ligue 1 | 3 | 0 | 0 | 0 | — | | 0 | 0 | – | | 3 | 0 |
| Career total | | | 27 | 1 | 4 | 1 | 0 | 0 | 5 | 1 | 1 | 0 | 37 | 3 |

=== International ===
As of match played 18 November 2026

Appearances and goals by national team and year
| National team | Year | Apps | Goals |
|---|---|---|---|
| Argentina | 2026 | 1 | 0 |
| Total | | 1 | 0 |

== Honours ==
Chelsea

- FIFA Club World Cup: 2025
