= Franco Petroli =

Argentine footballer (born 1998)

Personal information
- Full name: Franco Petroli
- Date of birth: 11 June 1998 (age 28)
- Place of birth: Avellaneda, Santa Fe, Argentina
- Height: 1.88 m (6 ft 2 in)
- Position: Goalkeeper

Team information
- Current team: Lanús
- Number: 1

Youth career
- River Plate

Senior career*
Years	Team	Apps	(Gls)
2021–2024	River Plate	0	(0)
2023	→ Estudiantes RC (loan)	23	(0)
2024–2026	Godoy Cruz	71	(0)
2026–	Lanús	2	(0)

International career
2013	Argentina U15	10	(0)
2014–2015	Argentina U17	12	(0)
2016–2017	Argentina U20	7	(0)
- * Club domestic league appearances and goals as of 17:03, 6 June 2026 (UTC)

Franco Petroli (born 11 June 1998) is an Argentine professional footballer who plays as a goalkeeper for Lanús.

== Club career ==
Petroli came through the youth setup at River Plate, who he joined aged 10. In 2013, he won the 8th division championship. In January 2018, he was called up by Marcelo Gallardo for pre-season training in the United States.

On June 5 2023, he was loaned to Primera Nacional club Estudiantes RC for 6 months, without a buy option. During his time there, he kept 15 clean sheets in 25 games, only conceding 12 goals in total.

On 4 January 2024, he left River Plate permanently for fellow Liga Profesional side Godoy Cruz, signing a 4-year contract. On 18 February, he kept a clean sheet in a 2–0 win against Racing Club, marking a milestone of 6 clean sheets in a row to begin his spell at Godoy Cruz.

On 15 January 2026, he joined Lanús until the end of 2030, despite a heart problem being found in his medical. Coach Mauricio Pellegrino signed him to provide competition for existing first-choice goalkeeper Nahuel Losada.

== International career ==
In August 2013, he was called up by Miguel Lemme to play in the Under-15 Nations Cup in Mexico. He helped the team to first place, conceding only one goal and being chosen as the best goalkeeper in the tournament. In November, he was part of the Argentina national under-15 team, competing in the 2013 South American under-15 Championship in Bolivia, reaching 3rd place.

On 1 March 2014, he was among the 18 players called up by Lemme to compete in the 2014 South American Games with the under-17 team, in which he won the silver medal. On 25 January 2015, he was included in the preliminary squad of 31 players for the South American U-17 Championship in Paraguay and, on 20 February, made the final squad of 22.

In 2017, he was called up for the Argentina national under-20 team for the South American Championship and the World Cup.

== Career statistics ==
As of 13 February 2026

Appearances and goals by club, season and competition
Club	Season	League			Cup (Note: Includes Copa Argentina)		Continental		Other		Total	
Club	Season	Division	Goals	Apps	Apps	Goals	Apps	Goals	Apps	Goals	Apps	Goals
River Plate	2022	Liga Profesional	0	0	0	0	—		—		0	0
Estudiantes RC (loan)	2023	Primera Nacional	23	0	2	0	—		—		25	0
Godoy Cruz	2024	Liga Profesional	39	0	1	0	2 (Note: Appearances in Copa Libertadores)	0	—		42	0
Godoy Cruz	2025	Liga Profesional	32	0	1	0	8 (Note: Appearances in Copa Sudamericana)	0	—		41	0
Godoy Cruz	Total		71	0	2	0	10	0	0	0	83	0
Lanús	2026	Liga Profesional	0	0	0	0	0	0	0	0	0	0
Career total			94	0	4	0	10	0	0	0	108	0
