= Santino Andino =

Argentine footballer (born 2005)

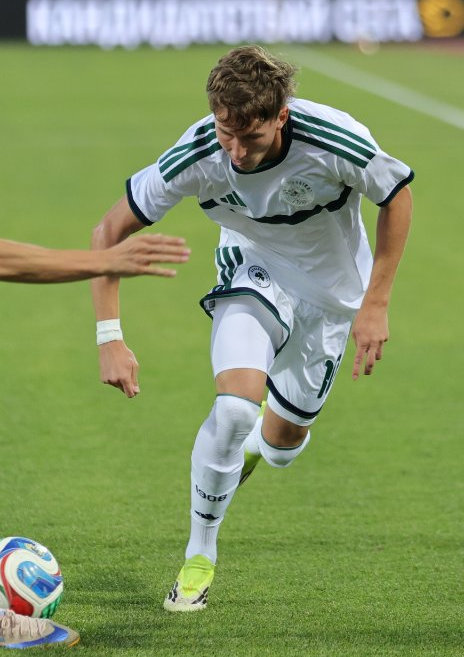

Personal information
- Full name: Santino Andino Valencia
- Date of birth: 25 October 2005 (age 21)
- Place of birth: Mendoza, Argentina
- Height: 1.74 m (5 ft 9 in)
- Position: Winger

Team information
- Current team: Panathinaikos
- Number: 10

Youth career
- –2024: Godoy Cruz

Senior career*
Years	Team	Apps	(Gls)
2024–2026	Godoy Cruz	36	(6)
2026–	Panathinaikos	25	(2)

International career^{‡}
2024–	Argentina U20	14	(2)
Medal record
Men's football
Representing Argentina
FIFA U-20 World Cup
Runner-up	2025 Chile
South American U-20 Championship
Runner-up	2025 Venezuela
- * Club domestic league appearances and goals as of 14 November 2026 ‡ National team caps and goals as of 10 January 2026

Santino Andino Valencia (born 25 October 2005) is an Argentine professional footballer who plays as a winger for Super League Greece club Panathinaikos.

== Career ==
He joined Godoy Cruz at a young age and professed through the youth ranks signing a professional contract with the club in July 2024. He made his debut in the Argentine Primera Division in a 1–1 draw against Sarmiento de Junín in September 2024. Later that month, he scored his first league goal for the club against Club Atlético Huracán.

On 16 January 2026, he signed a contract with Panathinaikos. The two sides agreed on €10 million for 75% of the rights to the Argentine winger, while the remaining 25% will be kept by Godoy Cruz. The agreement even states that if Antino is not sold within the next three years, then Panathinaikos will be asked to buy the remaining 25% of his rights.

== Style of play ==
Godoy Cruz coach Daniel Oldrá praised his pace after giving him his debut in the Argentina top flight.

== Career statistics ==
As of match played 23 July 2026

Appearances and goals by club, season and competition
Club	Season	League			National cup (Note: Includes Copa Argentina, Greek Cup)		Continental		Total	
Club	Season	Division	Apps	Goals	Apps	Goals	Apps	Goals	Apps	Goals
Godoy Cruz	2024	Argentine Primera División	15	2	0	0	0	0	15	2
Godoy Cruz	2025	Argentine Primera División	21	4	1	0	8 (Note: Appearances in Copa Sudamericana)	2	30	6
Godoy Cruz	Total		36	6	1	0	8	2	45	8
Panathinaikos	2025–26	Super League Greece	15	1	2	0	2 (Note: Appearances in UEFA Europa League)	0	19	1
Panathinaikos	2026–27	Super League Greece	0	0	0	0	1 (Note: Appearance in UEFA Conference League)	1	1	1
Panathinaikos	Total		15	1	2	0	3	1	20	2
Career total			45	6	1	0	10	3	56	9
