= Kevin Zenón =

Argentine footballer

Personal information
- Full name: Kevin Andrés Zenón
- Date of birth: 30 July 2001 (age 25)
- Place of birth: Goya, Corrientes, Argentina
- Height: 1.77 m (5 ft 10 in)
- Position: Midfielder

Team information
- Current team: Atlas
- Number: 20

Youth career
- Central Goya
- Huracán Goya
- San Ramón Goya
- 2018–2020: Unión Santa Fe

Senior career*
Years	Team	Apps	(Gls)
2020–2024	Unión Santa Fe	61	(3)
2024–2026	Boca Juniors	68	(7)
2026–	Atlas	5	(2)

International career^{‡}
2024–	Argentina U23	6	(1)
- * Club domestic league appearances and goals as of 05:25, 27 October 2026 (UTC) ‡ National team caps and goals as of 15:43, 16 August 2024 (UTC)

Kevin Andrés Zenón (born 30 July 2001) is an Argentine professional footballer who plays as a midfielder for Liga MX club Atlas.

Zenón competed for Argentina at the 2024 Summer Olympics.

== Career ==
Zenón spent his early career with Goya teams Central, Huracán and San Ramón. In 2018, after a trial with Newell's Old Boys, Zenón joined Unión Santa Fe; following a recommendation from Lionel Messi's father, Jorge. He made the breakthrough into Unión's first-team in October 2020, featuring in friendlies primarily as a left-back. His senior debut arrived on 29 October in a Copa Sudamericana home loss to Ecuadorian club Emelec; he was substituted on midway through the second half in place of Ezequiel Cañete. Zenón's first start came on 1 November against Arsenal de Sarandí in the Copa de la Liga Profesional.

== Style of play ==
Zenón is primarily a midfielder, although he's capable of playing at left-back and as a winger.

== Personal life ==
Born in Argentina, Zenón is of Syrian descent.

== Career statistics ==
As of 16 August 2024.

Appearances and goals by club, season and competition
Club	Season	League			Cup (Note: Includes Copa Argentina)		League Cup (Note: Includes Copa de la Liga Profesional)		Continental		Total	
Club	Season	Division	Apps	Goals	Apps	Goals	Apps	Goals	Apps	Goals	Apps	Goals
Unión Santa Fe	2020–21	Primera División	—		—		6	0	3 (Note: Appearances in the Copa Sudamericana)	0	9	0
Unión Santa Fe	2021	Primera División	20	0	—		12	1	—		32	1
Unión Santa Fe	2022	Primera División	20	1	1	0	10	0	7	1	38	2
Unión Santa Fe	2023	Primera División	21	2	1	0	14	1	—		36	3
Unión Santa Fe	Total		61	3	2	0	42	2	10	1	115	6
Boca Juniors	2024	Primera División	4	0	2	0	16	2	6	2	28	4
Boca Juniors	Total		4	0	2	0	16	2	6	2	28	4
Career total			65	3	4	0	58	4	16	3	143	10

== Honours ==
Boca Juniors

- Argentine Primera División: 2026 Liga
