= Bernardo Larroudé =

Coordinates: 35°02′S 63°34′W

- Rural locality and village
- Interactive map of Bernardo Larroudé
- Country: Argentina
- Province: La Pampa Province
- Time zone: UTC−3 (ART)

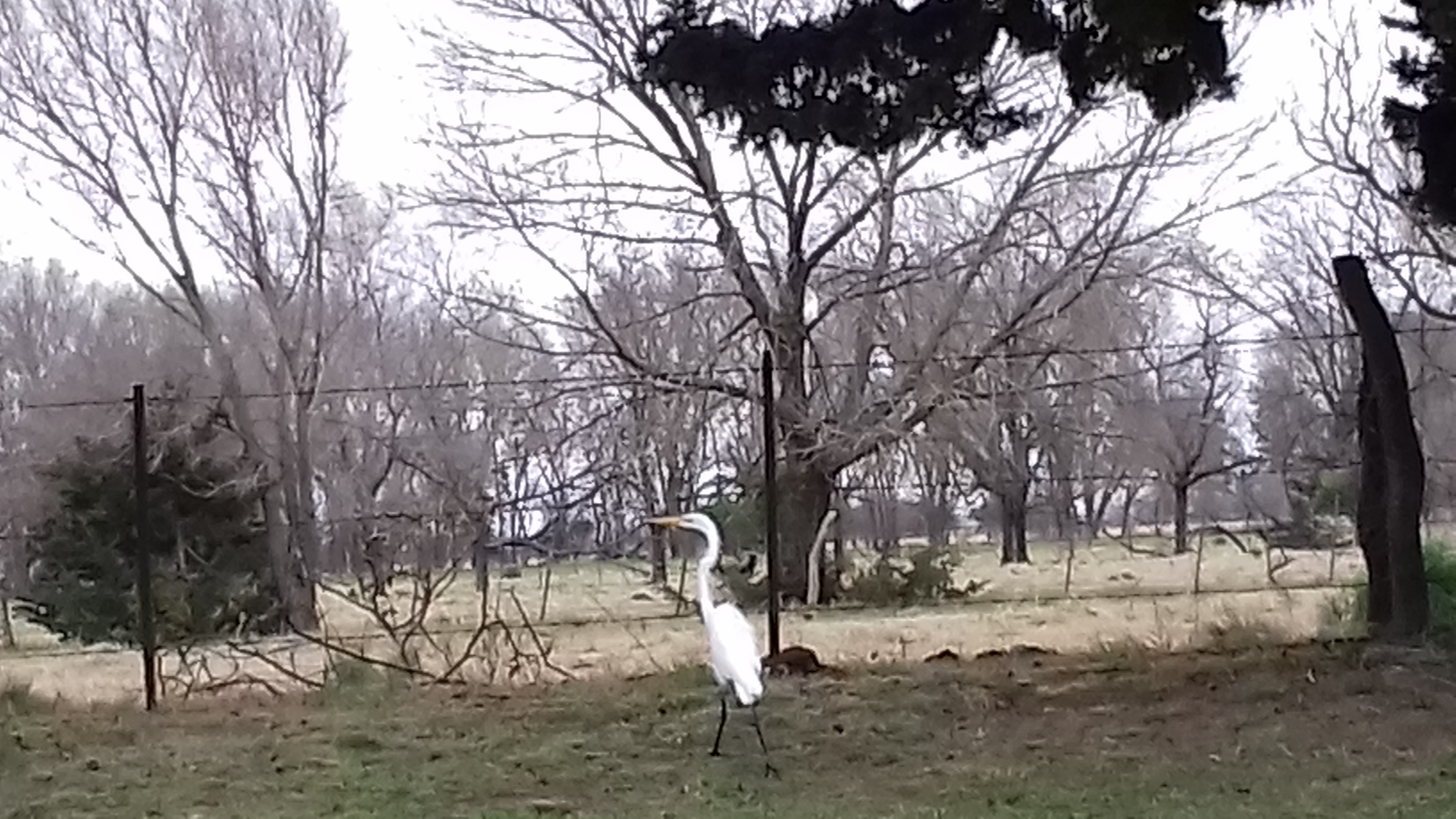
A white egret, a typical bird of the La Pampa region, photographed in Bernardo Larroudé

Bernardo Larroudé is a village and rural locality (municipality) in La Pampa Province in Argentina.
