= Bruno Leyes =

Argentine footballer

Personal information
- Full name: Bruno Javier Leyes Sosa
- Date of birth: 30 October 2001 (age 25)
- Place of birth: Mendoza, Argentina
- Height: 1.73 m (5 ft 8 in)
- Position: Midfielder

Team information
- Current team: Tigre (on loan from Godoy Cruz)
- Number: 5

Youth career
- Godoy Cruz

Senior career*
Years	Team	Apps	(Gls)
2021–	Godoy Cruz	116	(1)
2025–	→ Tigre (loan)	37	(0)
- * Club domestic league appearances and goals as of 17:46, 9 November 2026 (UTC)

Bruno Javier Leyes Sosa (born 30 October 2001) is an Argentine professional footballer who plays as a midfielder for Tigre, on loan from Godoy Cruz.

== Career ==
Leyes came through the youth setup at Godoy Cruz after joining from FADEP. He made his league debut on 20 July 2021 in a 2–1 victory against Rosario Central and marked his appearance with a goal in the 64th minute, which was the equaliser as his side went on to win. In November, he signed his first professional contract until 2025. In December 2023, he suffered a shoulder injury that kept him out for 2 months. On 8 April 2024, Godoy Cruz beat Sarmiento 1–0 to secure 1st place in Zone B of the Copa de la Liga Profesional. Just under a month earlier, Leyes described his team as the best in Argentina. On 19 August, he reached his 100 games milestone for the club in a win against Deportivo Riestra.

In July 2025, it was announced that he had been loaned to Tigre for 18 months.

== Career statistics ==
As of 11 February 2026

Appearances and goals by club, season and competition
Club	Season	League			Cup (Note: Includes Copa Argentina)		Continental		Other		Total	
Club	Season	Division	Goals	Apps	Apps	Goals	Apps	Goals	Apps	Goals	Apps	Goals
Godoy Cruz	2019–20	Liga Profesional	0	0	3	0	—		—		3	0
Godoy Cruz	2021	Liga Profesional	17	1	0	0	—		—		17	1
Godoy Cruz	2022	Liga Profesional	17	0	3	0	—		—		20	0
Godoy Cruz	2023	Liga Profesional	35	0	2	0	—		—		37	0
Godoy Cruz	2024	Liga Profesional	34	0	3	0	1 (Note: Appearance in Copa Libertadores)	0	—		38	0
Godoy Cruz	2025	Liga Profesional	13	0	0	0	5 (Note: Appearances in Copa Sudamericana)	0	—		18	0
Godoy Cruz	Total		116	1	11	0	6	0	0	0	133	1
Tigre (loan)	2025	Liga Profesional	12	0	2	0	—		—		14	0
Tigre (loan)	2026	Liga Profesional	4	0	0	0	—		—		4	0
Tigre (loan)	Total		16	0	2	0	0	0	0	0	18	0
Career total			132	1	13	0	6	0	0	0	151	1
