= Wilson Quiñonez =

Paraguayan footballer (born 1988)

Personal information
- Full name: Wilson Daniel Quiñonez
- Date of birth: 4 September 1988 (age 38)
- Place of birth: Fernando de la Mora, Paraguay
- Height: 1.84 m (6 ft 0 in)
- Position: Goalkeeper

Team information
- Current team: [Sportivo Trinidense]
- Number: 1

Senior career*
Years	Team	Apps	(Gls)
2008−2011	Sport Colombia	40	(0)
2011–2012	Sportivo Luqueño	6	(0)
2012	Sportivo Carapeguá	15	(0)
2012–2013	Rubio Ñú	5	(0)
2013–2014	Sport Colombia		
2014−2015	12 de Octubre	3	(0)
2015	Tacuary		
2015−	Sportivo San Lorenzo	55	(0)
- * Club domestic league appearances and goals as of 29 July 2020

Wilson Daniel Quiñonez (born 4 September 1988), known as Wilson Quiñonez, is a Paraguayan professional footballer who plays as a goalkeeper for Sportivo Trinidense in the Paraguayan Primera División as of the 2024 season.

== Career ==
=== Club career ===
Quiñonez was born in Fernando de la Mora, Paraguay and started his professional career with Sport Colombia in 2008. He is best known for scoring from 83 meters out with a free kick in a 2011 Paraguayan División Intermedia (second division) game between Sport Colombia and Cerro Porteño, considered one of the longest free kicks ever scored in FIFA history.
