= Agustín Martegani =

Argentine footballer

Personal information
- Full name: Agustín Alberto Martegani
- Date of birth: 20 May 2000 (age 26)
- Place of birth: Rojas, Buenos Aires, Argentina
- Height: 1.83 m (6 ft 0 in)
- Position: Midfielder

Team information
- Current team: Independiente Medellín (on loan from Boca Juniors)
- Number: 21

Youth career
- CA Argentino de Rojas
- 2017–2021: San Lorenzo

Senior career*
Years	Team	Apps	(Gls)
2021–2024	San Lorenzo	55	(4)
2023–2024	→ Salernitana (loan)	18	(1)
2024–	Boca Juniors	9	(0)
2026–	→ Independiente Medellín (loan)	11	(1)
- * Club domestic league appearances and goals as of 18:17, 3 October 2026 (UTC)

Agustín Alberto Martegani (born 20 May 2000) is an Argentine professional footballer who plays as a midfielder for Categoría Primera A club Independiente Medellín, on loan from Boca Juniors.

== Career ==
Martegani joined San Lorenzo in 2017 having played as a younger player with his local Club Atlético Argentino de Rojas. He made his debut for San Lorenzo in the Copa Argentina against Club Sportivo Estudiantes on 22 May 2019. On 11 October 2021 Martegani scored his first league goal with a left footed strike in a 2–1 victory over Club Atlético Colón.

Martegani had played 18 matches and scored 3 goals during the 2022 season when he was left out by manager Rubén Darío Insúa for a match against Tigre in June 2022 following a transfer offer thought to be in the region of $4million from Flamengo. San Lorenzo also reported an offer of €4million came in from Hellas Verona for his services which was rejected as insufficient. However, after no transfer was agreed Insua said he welcomed Martegani back into his squad for the remainder of 2022.

On 25 August 2023, Martegani joined Italian club Salernitana on loan with an option to buy.

== Style of play ==
A left-footed playmaker, Martegani has been praised for his dribbling, through balls and ability to shoot from range.
