= Brian Aguirre =

Argentine footballer

Personal information
- Full name: Brian Nicolás Aguirre
- Date of birth: 6 January 2003 (age 23)
- Place of birth: Granadero Baigorria, Santa Fe Province, Argentina
- Height: 1.75 m (5 ft 9 in)
- Position: Forward

Team information
- Current team: Estudiantes (on loan from Boca Juniors)
- Number: 28

Youth career
- 2015–2021: Newell's Old Boys

Senior career*
Years	Team	Apps	(Gls)
2021–2024	Newell's Old Boys	58	(4)
2024–	Boca Juniors	34	(3)
2026–	→ Estudiantes (loan)	19	(1)

International career
2019	Argentina U17	3	(0)
2022–	Argentina U20	2	(0)
- * Club domestic league appearances and goals as of 17:38, 21 November 2026 (UTC)

Brian Nicolás Aguirre (born 6 January 2003) is an Argentine professional footballer who plays as a forward for Argentine Primera División club Estudiantes, on loan from Boca Juniors.

== Club career ==
Aguirre joined Newell's Old Boys' youth academy in 2015. He made his first appearance for the senior squad on 26 April 2021 in a 1–2 loss against Gimnasia y Esgrima de La Plata for the Copa de la Liga Profesional. He renewed his contract with the club at the end of the season.

In September 2022, he suffered a knee injury that left him out of the 2022 season.

== International career ==
Aguirre was called up to the Argentina national under-20 football team for the 2022 Maurice Revello Tournament in France.

In January 2023, he was called up to the Argentina national under-20 football team ahead of the 2023 South American Championship.

== Career statistics ==
=== Club ===
As of 11 January 2023

Appearances and goals by club, season and competition
Club	Season	League			Cup		Continental		Other		Total	
Club	Season	Division	Apps	Goals	Apps	Goals	Apps	Goals	Apps	Goals	Apps	Goals
Newell's Old Boys	2020–21	Argentine Primera División	0	0	1	0	0	0	0	0	1	0
Newell's Old Boys	2021	Argentine Primera División	2	0	1	0	2	0	0	0	5	0
Newell's Old Boys	2022	Argentine Primera División	8	0	1	0	0	0	0	0	9	0
Boca Juniors	2023	Argentine Primera División	5	1	2	0	6	1	0	0	13	2
Boca Juniors	2024	Argentine Primera División	7	1	1	0	5	0	0	0	13	1
Career total			10	0	3	0	2	0	0	0	15	0
