= Nahuel Ulariaga =

Argentine footballer (born 2002)

Personal information
- Full name: Silvio Nahuel Ulariaga
- Date of birth: 2 March 2002 (age 24)
- Place of birth: Veinticinco de Mayo, Argentina
- Position: Centre-forward

Team information
- Current team: Godoy Cruz

Youth career
- CD Plaza Italia
- 2011–2016: Juventud Unida Universitario
- 2016–2020: Godoy Cruz

Senior career*
Years	Team	Apps	(Gls)
2020–	Godoy Cruz	28	(5)

International career
2017	Argentina U15		
- * Club domestic league appearances and goals as of 19:10, 18 March 2026 (UTC)

Silvio Nahuel Ulariaga (born 2 March 2002) is an Argentine professional footballer who plays as a centre-forward for Godoy Cruz.

== Club career ==
Ulariaga started his career at the age of six with Club Deportivo Plaza Italia. In 2011, Ulariaga headed to Juventud Unida Universitario. In 2016, the forward joined Godoy Cruz. Ulariaga, after penning professional terms in 2019, was promoted into Diego Martínez's first-team in December 2020, initially as a sub for Copa de la Liga Profesional games with Central Córdoba and Newell's Old Boys. Ulariaga made his senior debut in the same competition on 27 December, as he started an eventual 6–1 loss to Racing Club. He scored his first goal in the process after five minutes, though departed nine minutes later with a knee injury.

== International career ==
In July 2017, Ulariaga was called up by Diego Placente for the Argentina U15s ahead of friendlies with Huracán and Estudiantes.

== Career statistics ==
As of 27 December 2020.

Appearances and goals by club, season and competition
Club	Season	League			Cup		League Cup		Continental		Other		Total	
Club	Season	Division	Apps	Goals	Apps	Goals	Apps	Goals	Apps	Goals	Apps	Goals	Apps	Goals
Godoy Cruz	2020–21 (Note: Soccerway counts Copa de la Liga Profesional appearances as league appearances.)	Primera División	2	2	0	0	0	0	—		0	0	2	2
Career total			2	2	0	0	0	0	—		0	0	2	2
