= Ignacio Miramón =

Argentine footballer (born 2003)

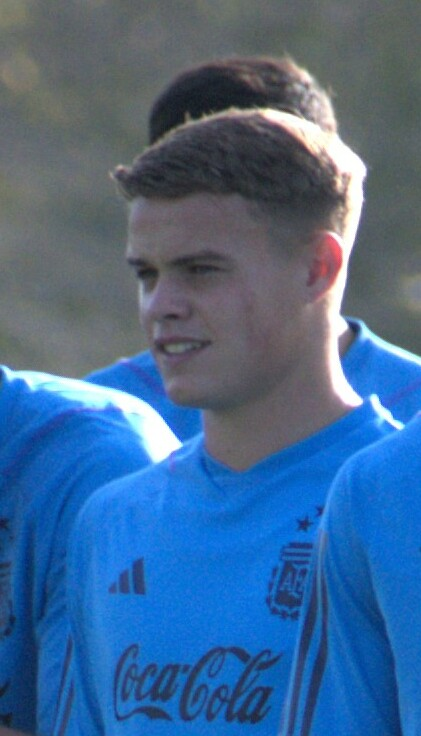
- Miramón with Argentina U20 in 2023

Personal information
- Full name: Juan Ignacio Miramón
- Date of birth: 12 June 2003 (age 23)
- Place of birth: Bolívar, Argentina
- Height: 1.73 m (5 ft 8 in)
- Position: Defensive midfielder

Team information
- Current team: Gimnasia LP (on loan from Lille)
- Number: 5

Youth career
- Balonpié de Bolívar
- 2019–2020: Gimnasia LP

Senior career*
Years	Team	Apps	(Gls)
2020–2023	Gimnasia LP	22	(0)
2023–	Lille	2	(0)
2024–2025	→ Boca Juniors (loan)	18	(0)
2026–	→ Gimnasia LP (loan)	13	(0)

International career^{‡}
2023	Argentina U20	4	(0)
- * Club domestic league appearances and goals as of 17:08, 9 July 2026 (UTC) ‡ National team caps and goals as of 26 May 2023

Juan Ignacio "Nacho" Miramón (born 12 June 2003) is an Argentine professional footballer who plays as a defensive midfielder for Argentine Primera División club Gimnasia LP, on loan from Ligue 1 club Lille.

== Career ==
Miramón left Balonpié de Bolívar to join Gimnasia y Esgrima in 2019. He was promoted into their first-team for pre-season training in August 2020 by manager Diego Maradona. He made his unofficial bow in a friendly with San Lorenzo on 30 September 2020. Having featured further in pre-season, Miramón made the competitive bench on eight occasions during the 2020 Copa de la Liga Profesional. After going unused on matchday one of the 2021 Copa de la Liga Profesional against Boca Juniors, Miramón made his senior debut on 19 February 2021 during a win over Talleres; he replaced Eric Ramírez with eighteen minutes left.

On 7 January 2026, Miramón returned to Gimnasia LP on loan.

== Personal life ==
Miramón comes from a footballing family. His great-grandfather (Cholo Azpiroz), grandfather (“Perro” Miramón), father (Emilio Miramón), uncle (Guillermo Panaro) and cousins (Agustín and Manuel Panaro) all played in the Argentine pyramid. On 19 December 2020, it was announced that Miramón had tested positive for COVID-19 amid the pandemic; he was asymptomatic.

== Career statistics ==
As of 20 February 2021

Appearances and goals by club, season and competition
Club	Season	League			National cup		League cup		Continental		Other		Total	
Club	Season	Division	Apps	Goals	Apps	Goals	Apps	Goals	Apps	Goals	Apps	Goals	Apps	Goals
Gimnasia y Esgrima	2020–21 (Note: Soccerway counts 2020 Copa de la Liga Profesional appearances as league appearances.)	Primera División	0	0	0	0	0	0	—		0	0	0	0
Gimnasia y Esgrima	2021 (Note: Soccerway counts 2021 Copa de la Liga Profesional appearances as league appearances.)	Primera División	1	0	0	0	—		—		0	0	1	0
Career total			1	0	0	0	0	0	—		0	0	1	0

== Honours ==
Individual

- Argentine Primera División Team of the Season: 2023
