= Juan Barinaga (footballer, born October 2000) =

Argentine professional footballer

Personal information
- Full name: Juan Ignacio Barinaga
- Date of birth: 10 October 2000 (age 26)
- Place of birth: Rosario, Argentina
- Height: 1.82 m (6 ft 0 in)
- Position: Right-back

Team information
- Current team: Racing Club (on loan from Boca Juniors)
- Number: 14

Youth career
- Newell's Old Boys
- ADIUR
- 2017–2019: Belgrano

Senior career*
Years	Team	Apps	(Gls)
2019–2024	Belgrano	105	(8)
2024–	Boca Juniors	37	(0)
2026–	→ Racing Club (loan)	2	(0)
- * Club domestic league appearances and goals as of 18:06, 8 November 2026 (UTC)

Juan Ignacio Barinaga (born 10 October 2000) is an Argentine professional footballer who plays as a right-back for Argentine Primera División club Racing Club, on loan from Boca Juniors.

== Career ==
Barinaga started his career with Newell's Old Boys, before heading to Agrupación Deportiva Infantil Unión Rosario (also known for its acronym "ADIUR") at the age of thirteen. Following a 2016 trial, Barinaga joined Belgrano in early 2017. He was moved into Alfredo Berti's senior set-up in mid-2019, originally as an unused substitute for a Copa Argentina loss to Real Pilar and a Primera B Nacional win over Barracas Central in July and August respectively. Barinaga's professional debut would arrive on 6 September during a 1–1 draw on the road against Deportivo Morón, after he was substituted on in place of Sebastián Luna. He scored his first goal on 5 December versus Independiente Rivadavia.

== Career statistics ==
As of 15 December 2020.

Appearances and goals by club, season and competition
Club	Season	League			Cup		League Cup		Continental		Other		Total	
Club	Season	Division	Apps	Goals	Apps	Goals	Apps	Goals	Apps	Goals	Apps	Goals	Apps	Goals
Belgrano	2019–20	Primera B Nacional	5	0	0	0	—		—		0	0	5	0
Belgrano	2020	Primera B Nacional	3	1	0	0	—		—		0	0	3	1
Career total			8	1	0	0	—		—		0	0	8	1

== Honours ==
Belgrano

- Primera Nacional: 2022

Boca Juniors

- Argentine Primera División: 2026 Liga
