= Leandro Mamut =

Argentine professional footballer

Personal information
- Full name: Leandro Juan Hugo Mamut
- Date of birth: 31 December 2003 (age 22)
- Place of birth: Barrio Islas Malvinas, Argentina
- Height: 1.78 m (5 ft 10 in)
- Position: Attacking midfielder

Team information
- Current team: Gimnasia LP
- Number: 34

Youth career
- Club Las Malvinas
- 2013–2016: ADAFI
- 2017–2021: Gimnasia LP

Senior career*
Years	Team	Apps	(Gls)
2021–	Gimnasia LP	31	(1)
- * Club domestic league appearances and goals as of 18:25, 31 December 2025 (UTC)

Leandro Juan Hugo Mamut (born 31 December 2003) is an Argentine professional footballer who plays as an attacking midfielder for Gimnasia La Plata.

== Career ==
Mamut began his career at the age of four with Club Las Malvinas, prior to his departure to Asociación Deportiva Anunciación de Fútbol Infantil (ADAFI) in 2013. Three years later, Mamut headed to Gimnasia y Esgrima. He signed his first professional contract on 27 January 2020; aged sixteen. Mamut, who'd appear non-competitively in the intervening period, made the jump into senior football just over twelve months later on 19 February 2021, as he appeared on the bench for a Copa de la Liga Profesional match against Talleres. His debut soon arrived, as he came on to replace Matías Miranda in stoppage time of a 3–0 win.

== Personal life ==
Mamut comes from a family of amateur boxers, with him being the only one of eight siblings to choose football at a young age. His father died in a motorcycle accident on 11 March 2014.

== Career statistics ==
As of 20 February 2021.

Appearances and goals by club, season and competition
Club	Season	League			Cup		League Cup		Continental		Other		Total	
Club	Season	Division	Apps	Goals	Apps	Goals	Apps	Goals	Apps	Goals	Apps	Goals	Apps	Goals
Gimnasia y Esgrima	2021 (Note: Soccerway counts Copa de la Liga Profesional appearances as league appearances.)	Primera División	1	0	0	0	—		—		0	0	1	0
Career total			1	0	0	0	—		—		0	0	1	0
