= Daniel Barrea =

Argentine footballer

Personal information
- Full name: Daniel Octavio Barrea
- Date of birth: 22 June 2001 (age 25)
- Place of birth: Córdoba, Argentina
- Height: 1.83 m (6 ft 0 in)
- Position: Striker

Team information
- Current team: Universidad de Concepción (on loan from Godoy Cruz)
- Number: 9

Youth career
- Belgrano

Senior career*
Years	Team	Apps	(Gls)
2022–2023	Belgrano	10	(0)
2023	→ Godoy Cruz (loan)	11	(1)
2024	Godoy Cruz	51	(4)
2026–	→ Universidad de Concepción (loan)	2	(1)
- * Club domestic league appearances and goals as of 10 March 2026

Daniel Octavio Barrea (born 22 June 2001) is an Argentine professional footballer who plays as a striker for Chilean Primera División club Universidad de Concepción on loan from Godoy Cruz.

== Club career ==
Born in Córdoba, Argentina, Barrea was trained at Belgrano. He was promoted to the first team in 2022, signed his first professional contract in March of the same year and made his professional debut in the 2–1 win against Deportivo Riestra on 16 April for the 2022 Primera Nacional. That season, they became the champions and got promotion to the Argentine Primera División. In August 2023, he was loaned out to Godoy Cruz.

In January 2024, Barrea permanently joined Godoy Cruz. In February 2026, he was loaned out to Chilean Primera División club Universidad de Concepción for a year with an option to buy.
