= Diego Martínez (footballer, born 1978) =

Argentine football manager

Personal information
- Full name: Diego Hernán Martínez
- Date of birth: 16 November 1978 (age 47)
- Place of birth: Buenos Aires, Argentina
- Height: 1.72 m (5 ft 8 in)
- Position: Midfielder

Team information
- Current team: Huracán (manager)

Senior career*
Years	Team	Apps	(Gls)
1997–1998	Almirante Brown		
1998–1999	Cañuelas		
1999–2000	Deportivo Morón	0	(0)
2000–2001	Ituzaingó	40	(8)
2001–2002	Estudiantes BA		
2002	Aurora	0	(0)
2003	Gimnasia y Esgrima (CdU)	18	(3)
2003–2005	All Boys		
2005–2006	Temperley		
2006–2007	All Boys		
2007–2010	Pierikos	71	(6)
2010–2011	Diagoras	3	(0)
2011	Estudiantes BA		
2013–2014	Belgrano de Zárate	9	(2)

Managerial career
- 2015–2016: Ituzaingó
- 2016–2017: Cañuelas
- 2018: Comunicaciones
- 2018: Midland
- 2018–2020: Estudiantes BA
- 2020: Godoy Cruz
- 2021–2023: Tigre
- 2023: Huracán
- 2024: Boca Juniors
- 2025: Cerro Porteño
- 2026–: Huracán
- * Club domestic league appearances and goals

Diego Hernán Martínez (born 16 November 1978) is an Argentine football manager and former player who played as a midfielder. He is the current manager of Huracán.

== Playing career ==
A midfielder, Martínez never appeared in any higher than Primera B Nacional, with his only input in the category being three goals in 18 appearances for Gimnasia y Esgrima de Concepción del Uruguay in the 2002–03 season. He also played abroad, spending half a year with Aurora in Guatemala, where he did not appear, and four seasons in Greece with Pierikos and Diagoras.

== Managerial career ==
After retiring Martínez started working as a coach, being initially in charge Boca Juniors' youth categories before taking over his first senior job at Ituzaingó, a club he already represented as a player. After another work at Cañuelas, also a former side, he was in charge of Comunicaciones (for only five matches) and Midland before taking over Estudiantes de Buenos Aires in June 2018.

With Estudiantes, Martínez achieved promotion from Primera B Metropolitana, and also reached the semifinals of the 2018–19 Copa Argentina, being knocked out by River Plate.

On 10 August 2020, Martínez was presented as manager of Primera División side Godoy Cruz. In 2021, he was announced as manager of Tigre.

Sacked by Tigre on 13 June 2023, Martínez took over Huracán on 3 July. He resigned from the latter on 7 December.

On 26 December 2023, Martínez returned to Boca to become their first team manager.

On 4 December 2025, Martínez began a second stint with CA Huracán, signing as the first team manager through June 2027.

== Managerial statistics ==
As of match played 24 October 2026

Managerial record by team and tenure
Team	From	To	Record							
Team	From	To	G	W	D	L	GF	GA	GD	Win %
Ituzaingó	1 November 2015	16 June 2016	44	17	18	9	43	31	+12	38.64
Cañuelas	29 June 2016	31 December 2017	57	23	18	16	73	51	+22	40.35
Comunicaciones	1 January 2018	19 February 2018	5	1	0	4	5	9	−4	20.00
Midland	20 February 2018	30 June 2018	17	4	4	9	19	28	−9	23.53
Estudiantes BA	1 July 2018	9 August 2020	65	34	14	17	99	65	+34	52.31
Godoy Cruz	10 August 2020	28 December 2020	9	0	2	7	4	18	−14	0.00
Tigre	11 January 2021	14 June 2023	110	44	38	28	148	113	+35	40.00
Huracán	3 July 2023	31 December 2023	23	12	3	8	29	20	+9	52.17
Boca Juniors	1 January 2024	28 September 2024	45	20	15	10	62	42	+20	44.44
Cerro Porteño	11 December 2024	18 September 2025	47	24	12	11	76	49	+27	51.06
Huracán	3 December 2025	present	34	12	11	11	34	32	+2	35.29
Total			456	191	135	130	592	458	+134	41.89

== Honours ==
=== Player ===
Ituzaingó

- Primera C: 2000–01

=== Manager ===
Tigre

- Primera Nacional: 2021
- Copa de la Liga Profesional runner-up: 2022
