= 2025 Copa Sudamericana group stage =

The 2025 Copa Sudamericana group stage was played from 1 April to 29 May 2025. A total of 32 teams competed in the group stage to decide 16 of the 24 places in the final stages of the 2025 Copa Sudamericana.

== Draw ==
The draw for the group stage was held on 17 March 2025, 20:00 PYT (UTC−3), at the CONMEBOL Convention Centre in Luque, Paraguay.

Teams were seeded by their CONMEBOL Clubs ranking as of 16 December 2024 (shown in parentheses), taking into account the following three factors:

1. Performance in the last 10 years, taking into account Copa Libertadores and Copa Sudamericana results in the period 2015–2024.
2. Historical coefficient, taking into account Copa Libertadores and Copa Sudamericana results in the period 1960–2014 and 2002–2014 respectively.
3. Local tournament champion, with bonus points awarded to domestic league champions of the last 10 years.

For the group stage, the 32 teams were drawn into eight groups (Groups A–H) of four containing a team from each of the four pots. The four losers of the Copa Libertadores third stage were seeded into Pot 4. Teams from the same association could not be drawn into the same group.

Group stage draw
Pot 1	Pot 2	Pot 3	Pot 4
(Brazil) Atlético Mineiro (7); (Brazil) Fluminense (10); (Brazil) Grêmio (11); (Argentina) Independiente (22); (Brazil) Cruzeiro (26); (Argentina) Lanús (30); (Argentina) Defensa y Justicia (33); (Colombia) América de Cali (40)	(Paraguay) Guaraní (47); (Chile) Palestino (55); (Venezuela) Caracas (58); (Brazil) Vasco da Gama (66); (Argentina) Huracán (70); (Ecuador) Universidad Católica (71); (Chile) Unión Española (79); (Argentina) Godoy Cruz (80)	(Colombia) Once Caldas (96); (Uruguay) Racing (100); (Argentina) Unión (101); (Bolivia) Nacional Potosí (113); (Peru) Cienciano (118); (Paraguay) Sportivo Luqueño (123); (Venezuela) Academia Puerto Cabello (159); (Uruguay) Cerro Largo (192)	(Ecuador) Mushuc Runa (232); (Peru) Atlético Grau (250); (Brazil) Vitória (256); (Bolivia) GV San José (No rank); (Chile) Deportes Iquique (153); (Uruguay) Boston River (206); (Peru) Melgar (51); (Brazil) Corinthians (18)

Notes

1. ^{CLQ3} The Copa Libertadores third stage losers were seeded in Pot 4.

The following are the four losers of the third stage of the 2025 Copa Libertadores qualifying stages which joined the 12 direct entrants and the 16 Copa Sudamericana first stage winners in the group stage.

Match	Third stage losers
G1	(Chile) Deportes Iquique
G2	(Uruguay) Boston River
G3	(Peru) Melgar
G4	(Brazil) Corinthians

== Format ==
In the group stage, each group was played on a home-and-away round-robin basis. Teams were ranked according to the following criteria: 1. Points (3 points for a win, 1 point for a draw, and 0 points for a loss); 2. Goal difference; 3. Goals scored; 4. Away goals scored; 5. CONMEBOL ranking (Regulations Article 2.4.2).

The winners of each group advanced to the round of 16 of the final stages, whilst the runners-up of each group advanced to the knockout round play-offs of the final stages.

== Schedule ==
The schedule of each matchday was as follows (Regulations Article 2.2.2).

Matchday	Dates	Matches
Matchday 1	1–3 April 2025	Team 4 vs. Team 2, Team 3 vs. Team 1
Matchday 2	8–10 April 2025	Team 2 vs. Team 3, Team 1 vs. Team 4
Matchday 3	22–24 April 2025	Team 2 vs. Team 1, Team 4 vs. Team 3
Matchday 4	6–8 May 2025	Team 3 vs. Team 2, Team 4 vs. Team 1
Matchday 5	13–15 May 2025	Team 1 vs. Team 2, Team 3 vs. Team 4
Matchday 6	27–29 May 2025	Team 1 vs. Team 3, Team 2 vs. Team 4

== Groups ==
=== Group A ===
Pos	Team	Pld	W	D	L	GF	GA	GD	Pts	Qualification	IND	GUA	BOS	NAP
1	(Argentina) Independiente	6	4	0	2	16	6	+10	12	Advance to round of 16	—	1–0	2–1	7–0
2	(Paraguay) Guaraní	6	2	2	2	9	12	−3	8	Advance to knockout round play-offs	2–1	—	0–5	2–0
3	(Uruguay) Boston River	6	2	1	3	12	14	−2	7		1–5	3–3	—	2–1
4	(Bolivia) Nacional Potosí	6	2	1	3	8	13	−5	7		2–0	2–2	3–0	—

Source: CONMEBOL
1 April 2025
19:00 UTC−3

Boston River (Uruguay)	3–3	(Paraguay) Guaraní
A. González 27'; Noguera 50'; Albarracín 72'	Report	Mendieta 54'; F. Fernández 60'; Vargas 90+1'

Estadio Centenario, Montevideo (Note: Boston River played their home matches at Estadio Centenario, Montevideo instead of their regular stadium Estadio Campeones Olímpicos, Florida which did not meet CONMEBOL requirements.)
Referee: Augusto Menéndez (Peru)
1 April 2025
18:00 UTC−4

Nacional Potosí (Bolivia)	2–0	(Argentina) Independiente
Ábrego 66'; Diellos 83'	Report

Estadio Víctor Agustín Ugarte, Potosí
Referee: Edina Alves (Brazil)

8 April 2025
19:00 UTC−3

Independiente (Argentina)	2–1	(Uruguay) Boston River
Galdames 61', 90+1'	Report	Muñoa 86'

Estadio Libertadores de América, Avellaneda
Attendance: 25,515
Referee: Bruno Arleu (Brazil)
10 April 2025
21:30 UTC−3

Guaraní (Paraguay)	2–0	(Bolivia) Nacional Potosí
F. Fernández 11'; Patiño 45+5'	Report

Estadio Defensores del Chaco, Asunción (Note: Guaraní played their home matches at Estadio Defensores del Chaco, Asunción (originally scheduled at Estadio Arsenio Erico, Asunción) instead of their regular stadium Estadio Rogelio Livieres, Asunción which is being rebuilt.)
Attendance: 1,028
Referee: Fernando Véjar (Chile)

22 April 2025
19:00 UTC−3

Guaraní (Paraguay)	2–1	(Argentina) Independiente
Vargas 28', 80'	Report	Loyola 60'

Estadio Defensores del Chaco, Asunción
Attendance: 4,109
Referee: Roberto Pérez (Peru)
22 April 2025
19:00 UTC−3

Boston River (Uruguay)	2–1	(Bolivia) Nacional Potosí
Albarracín 57'; Martínez 70'	Report	Torrico 21'

Estadio Centenario, Montevideo
Referee: Anderson Daronco (Brazil)

6 May 2025
18:00 UTC−4

Nacional Potosí (Bolivia)	2–2	(Paraguay) Guaraní
Hoyos 37'; Diellos 61'	Report	D. Fernández 63', 88' (pen.)

Estadio Víctor Agustín Ugarte, Potosí
Attendance: 1,762
Referee: Yender Herrera (Venezuela)
6 May 2025
21:30 UTC−3

Boston River (Uruguay)	1–5	(Argentina) Independiente
Anello 7'	Report	Giménez 14', 61' (pen.); Millán 21'; Tarzia 46'; Hidalgo 90+2'

Estadio Centenario, Montevideo
Attendance: 1,567
Referee: Jhon Ospina (Colombia)

13 May 2025
18:00 UTC−4

Nacional Potosí (Bolivia)	3–0	(Uruguay) Boston River
Diellos 54', 70'; Preciado 90+3'	Report

Estadio Víctor Agustín Ugarte, Potosí
Attendance: 1,418
Referee: Ramon Abatti (Brazil)
15 May 2025
19:00 UTC−3

Independiente (Argentina)	1–0	(Paraguay) Guaraní
Tarzia 43'	Report

Estadio Libertadores de América, Avellaneda
Attendance: 26,557
Referee: Flavio de Souza (Brazil)

28 May 2025
19:00 UTC−3

Independiente (Argentina)	7–0	(Bolivia) Nacional Potosí
Montiel 26', 53'; Tarzia 34'; Loyola 51'; Millán 77'; Echeverría 81' (o.g.); Galdames 84'	Report

Estadio Libertadores de América, Avellaneda
Referee: Paulo Zanovelli (Brazil)
28 May 2025
19:00 UTC−3

Guaraní (Paraguay)	0–5	(Uruguay) Boston River
	Report	F. Rodríguez 24'; Gutiérrez 41'; G. López 45+2', 65'; Barcia 49'

Estadio Defensores del Chaco, Asunción
Attendance: 925
Referee: Bryan Loayza (Ecuador)

=== Group B ===
Pos	Team	Pld	W	D	L	GF	GA	GD	Pts	Qualification	UCA	CRL	VIT	DYJ
1	(Ecuador) Universidad Católica	6	4	2	0	12	5	+7	14	Advance to round of 16	—	3–1	1–0	3–1
2	(Uruguay) Cerro Largo	6	2	1	3	5	8	−3	7	Advance to knockout round play-offs	1–3	—	0–1	0–0
3	(Brazil) Vitória	6	1	3	2	3	4	−1	6		1–1	0–1	—	1–1
4	(Argentina) Defensa y Justicia	6	0	4	2	4	7	−3	4		1–1	1–2	0–0	—

Source: CONMEBOL
2 April 2025
21:30 UTC−3

Vitória (Brazil)	1–1	(Ecuador) Universidad Católica
Matheuzinho 76' (pen.)	Report	Londoño 54'

Barradão, Salvador
Attendance: 23,084
Referee: José Cabero (Chile)
3 April 2025
21:30 UTC−3

Cerro Largo (Uruguay)	0–0	(Argentina) Defensa y Justicia
	Report

Estadio Centenario, Montevideo (Note: Cerro Largo played their home matches at Estadio Centenario, Montevideo instead of their regular stadium Estadio Arquitecto Antonio Eleuterio Ubilla, Melo which did not meet CONMEBOL requirements for this stage.)
Attendance: 569
Referee: Ivo Méndez (Bolivia)

10 April 2025
19:00 UTC−3

Defensa y Justicia (Argentina)	0–0	(Brazil) Vitória
	Report

Estadio Norberto Tomaghello, Gobernador Costa
Attendance: 3,575
Referee: Augusto Menéndez (Peru)
10 April 2025
21:00 UTC−5

Universidad Católica (Ecuador)	3–1	(Uruguay) Cerro Largo
Londoño 18'; I. Díaz 45+1', 90+4'	Report	Ferrarés 75'

Estadio Olímpico Atahualpa, Quito
Attendance: 1,764
Referee: Michael Espinoza (Peru)

23 April 2025
21:30 UTC−3

Vitória (Brazil)	0–1	(Uruguay) Cerro Largo
	Report	Peraza 75'

Barradão, Salvador
Attendance: 13,162
Referee: José Méndez (Paraguay)
24 April 2025
21:00 UTC−5

Universidad Católica (Ecuador)	3–1	(Argentina) Defensa y Justicia
I. Díaz 9' (pen.), 80'; Moreno 70'	Report	Gutiérrez 14'

Estadio Olímpico Atahualpa, Quito
Attendance: 1,839
Referee: Yender Herrera (Venezuela)

6 May 2025
19:00 UTC−3

Vitória (Brazil)	1–1	(Argentina) Defensa y Justicia
Edu 36'	Report	Togni 55'

Barradão, Salvador
Attendance: 8,158
Referee: Francisco Gilabert (Chile)
7 May 2025
19:00 UTC−3

Cerro Largo (Uruguay)	1–3	(Ecuador) Universidad Católica
Añasco 90+4'	Report	Palacios 20'; I. Díaz 31', 87'

Estadio Centenario, Montevideo
Attendance: 313
Referee: Ivo Méndez (Bolivia)

14 May 2025
19:00 UTC−3

Defensa y Justicia (Argentina)	1–1	(Ecuador) Universidad Católica
Cannavo 45+1'	Report	Chancellor 58'

Estadio Norberto Tomaghello, Gobernador Costa
Attendance: 6,000
Referee: José Méndez (Paraguay)
14 May 2025
21:30 UTC−3

Cerro Largo (Uruguay)	0–1	(Brazil) Vitória
	Report	Claudinho 83'

Estadio Centenario, Montevideo
Attendance: 500
Referee: Joel Alarcón (Peru)

28 May 2025
21:30 UTC−3

Defensa y Justicia (Argentina)	1–2	(Uruguay) Cerro Largo
Barbona 67'	Report	Assís 45+1'; Otormín 51'

Estadio Norberto Tomaghello, Gobernador Costa
Attendance: 2,185
Referee: Emikar Calderas (Venezuela)
28 May 2025
19:30 UTC−5

Universidad Católica (Ecuador)	1–0	(Brazil) Vitória
Baralhas 75' (o.g.)	Report

Estadio Olímpico Atahualpa, Quito
Attendance: 1,714
Referee: Yender Herrera (Venezuela)

=== Group C ===
Pos	Team	Pld	W	D	L	GF	GA	GD	Pts	Qualification	HUR	AME	COR	RCM
1	(Argentina) Huracán	6	4	2	0	11	2	+9	14	Advance to round of 16	—	0–0	1–0	5–0
2	(Colombia) América de Cali	6	1	5	0	6	4	+2	8	Advance to knockout round play-offs	0–0	—	1–1	1–1
3	(Brazil) Corinthians	6	2	2	2	5	5	0	8		1–2	1–1	—	1–0
4	(Uruguay) Racing	6	0	1	5	3	14	−11	1		1–3	1–3	0–1	—

Source: CONMEBOL
2 April 2025
19:00 UTC−3

Corinthians (Brazil)	1–2	(Argentina) Huracán
Raniele 13'	Report	Sequeira 6', 37'

Neo Química Arena, São Paulo
Attendance: 40,591
Referee: Cristian Garay (Chile)
2 April 2025
21:30 UTC−3

Racing (Uruguay)	1–3	(Colombia) América de Cali
Da Silva 90+2'	Report	Holgado 13'; Vergara 32'; Ramos 83'

Estadio Centenario, Montevideo (Note: Racing played their home matches at Estadio Centenario, Montevideo instead of their regular stadium Estadio Osvaldo Roberto, Montevideo which did not meet CONMEBOL requirements.)
Attendance: 1,409
Referee: Roberto Pérez (Peru)

8 April 2025
19:30 UTC−5

América de Cali (Colombia)	1–1	(Brazil) Corinthians
Ramos 24'	Report	Matheuzinho 81'

Estadio Pascual Guerrero, Cali
Attendance: 32,744
Referee: Jesús Valenzuela (Venezuela)
9 April 2025
19:00 UTC−3

Huracán (Argentina)	5–0	(Uruguay) Racing
Pereyra 8'; Cotugno 19' (o.g.); De La Fuente 35'; Urzi 45+2'; Pérez 53'	Report

Estadio Tomás Adolfo Ducó, Buenos Aires
Attendance: 8,690
Referee: Francisco Gilabert (Chile)

23 April 2025
19:00 UTC−3

Huracán (Argentina)	0–0	(Colombia) América de Cali
	Report

Estadio Tomás Adolfo Ducó, Buenos Aires
Attendance: 10,939
Referee: Augusto Aragón (Ecuador)
24 April 2025
19:00 UTC−3

Corinthians (Brazil)	1–0	(Uruguay) Racing
Romero 52'	Report

Neo Química Arena, São Paulo
Attendance: 39,074
Referee: Guillermo Guerrero (Ecuador)

6 May 2025
21:30 UTC−3

Corinthians (Brazil)	1–1	(Colombia) América de Cali
Depay 20'	Report	Navarro 46'

Neo Química Arena, São Paulo
Attendance: 39,846
Referee: Juan Benítez (Paraguay)
8 May 2025
19:00 UTC−3

Racing (Uruguay)	1–3	(Argentina) Huracán
Tomatis 25'	Report	Urzi 41'; Pereyra 55'; Cabral 90+5'

Estadio Centenario, Montevideo
Attendance: 1,536
Referee: Augusto Menéndez (Peru)

14 May 2025
21:00 UTC−5

América de Cali (Colombia)	0–0	(Argentina) Huracán
	Report

Estadio Pascual Guerrero, Cali
Attendance: 29,763
Referee: Cristian Garay (Chile)
15 May 2025
19:00 UTC−3

Racing (Uruguay)	0–1	(Brazil) Corinthians
	Report	Matheus Bidu 74'

Estadio Centenario, Montevideo
Attendance: 750
Referee: José Cabero (Chile)

27 May 2025
19:30 UTC−5

América de Cali (Colombia)	1–1	(Uruguay) Racing
Pestaña 90+5'	Report	Fonseca 75'

Estadio Pascual Guerrero, Cali
Attendance: 17,295
Referee: Alejandro Velázquez (Venezuela)
27 May 2025
21:30 UTC−3

Huracán (Argentina)	1–0	(Brazil) Corinthians
Watson 47'	Report

Estadio Tomás Adolfo Ducó, Buenos Aires
Attendance: 11,707
Referee: Gery Vargas (Bolivia)

=== Group D ===
Pos	Team	Pld	W	D	L	GF	GA	GD	Pts	Qualification	GOD	GRE	CAG	SLU
1	(Argentina) Godoy Cruz	6	3	3	0	10	5	+5	12	Advance to round of 16	—	2–2	2–2	2–0
2	(Brazil) Grêmio	6	3	3	0	8	4	+4	12	Advance to knockout round play-offs	1–1	—	2–0	1–0
3	(Peru) Atlético Grau	6	0	4	2	5	9	−4	4		0–2	0–0	—	2–2
4	(Paraguay) Sportivo Luqueño	6	0	2	4	4	9	−5	2		0–1	1–2	1–1	—

Source: CONMEBOL
2 April 2025
21:30 UTC−3

Sportivo Luqueño (Paraguay)	1–2	(Brazil) Grêmio
Santander 29'	Report	Arezo 17' (pen.); Braithwaite 71'

Estadio Defensores del Chaco, Asunción (Note: Sportivo Luqueño played their home matches at Estadio Defensores del Chaco, Asunción instead of their regular stadium Estadio Feliciano Cáceres, Luque which is closed for remodeling works.)
Attendance: 4,871
Referee: Francisco Gilabert (Chile)
2 April 2025
21:00 UTC−5

Atlético Grau (Peru)	0–2	(Argentina) Godoy Cruz
	Report	Mendoza 19'; Fernández 55'

Estadio Alejandro Villanueva, Lima (Note: Atlético Grau played their home matches at Estadio Alejandro Villanueva, Lima instead of their regular stadium Estadio Miguel Grau, Piura which has been abandoned for years.)
Attendance: 535
Referee: Guillermo Guerrero (Ecuador)

8 April 2025
19:00 UTC−3

Grêmio (Brazil)	2–0	(Peru) Atlético Grau
Arezo 37'; Olivera 67'	Report

Arena do Grêmio, Porto Alegre
Attendance: 12,385
Referee: Gery Vargas (Bolivia)
8 April 2025
21:30 UTC−3

Godoy Cruz (Argentina)	2–0	(Paraguay) Sportivo Luqueño
Mendoza 29'; Pascual 90+3'	Report

Estadio Malvinas Argentinas, Mendoza
Attendance: 3,168
Referee: Augusto Aragón (Ecuador)

23 April 2025
21:00 UTC−5

Atlético Grau (Peru)	2–2	(Paraguay) Sportivo Luqueño
Garro 44'; Bandiera 90+3'	Report	Ayala 8'; González 27'

Estadio Monumental, Lima (Note: Atlético Grau played their home match against Sportivo Luqueño at Estadio Monumental, Lima instead of the originally scheduled Estadio Alejandro Villanueva, Lima.)
Attendance: 226
Referee: Diego Ulloa (Colombia)
24 April 2025
19:00 UTC−3

Godoy Cruz (Argentina)	2–2	(Brazil) Grêmio
Auzmendi 63'; Martínez Dupuy 86'	Report	Edenilson 34'; Aravena 81'

Estadio Malvinas Argentinas, Mendoza
Attendance: 2,963
Referee: Francisco Gilabert (Chile)

6 May 2025
19:00 UTC−3

Sportivo Luqueño (Paraguay)	0–1	(Argentina) Godoy Cruz
	Report	Auzmendi 72'

Estadio La Huerta, Asunción (Note: Sportivo Luqueño played their home match against Godoy Cruz at Estadio La Huerta, Asunción instead of the originally scheduled Estadio Defensores del Chaco, Asunción.)
Attendance: 1,421
Referee: Bryan Loayza (Ecuador)
7 May 2025
19:30 UTC−5

Atlético Grau (Peru)	0–0	(Brazil) Grêmio
	Report

Estadio Alejandro Villanueva, Lima
Attendance: 202
Referee: José Burgos (Uruguay)

13 May 2025
19:00 UTC−3

Grêmio (Brazil)	1–1	(Argentina) Godoy Cruz
João Pedro 6'	Report	Andino 29'

Arena do Grêmio, Porto Alegre
Attendance: 15,472
Referee: Diego Ulloa (Colombia)
14 May 2025
19:00 UTC−3

Sportivo Luqueño (Paraguay)	1–1	(Peru) Atlético Grau
Bolívar 39' (o.g.)	Report	Rostaing 33'

Estadio Defensores del Chaco, Asunción
Attendance: 805
Referee: Dione Rissios (Chile)

29 May 2025
19:00 UTC−3

Grêmio (Brazil)	1–0	(Paraguay) Sportivo Luqueño
Riquelme Freitas 75'	Report

Arena do Grêmio, Porto Alegre
Attendance: 5,462
Referee: José Cabero (Chile)
29 May 2025
19:00 UTC−3

Godoy Cruz (Argentina)	2–2	(Peru) Atlético Grau
Auzmendi 48'; Martínez Dupuy 76'	Report	Bandiera 64'; Vilca 73'

Estadio Malvinas Argentinas, Mendoza
Attendance: 3,070
Referee: Javier Revollo (Bolivia)

=== Group E ===
Pos	Team	Pld	W	D	L	GF	GA	GD	Pts	Qualification	MUS	PAL	CRU	UNI
1	(Ecuador) Mushuc Runa	6	5	1	0	12	4	+8	16	Advance to round of 16	—	3–2	1–1	3–0
2	(Chile) Palestino	6	3	0	3	9	9	0	9	Advance to knockout round play-offs	0–2	—	2–1	2–0
3	(Brazil) Cruzeiro	6	1	2	3	5	7	−2	5		1–2	2–1	—	0–0
4	(Argentina) Unión	6	1	1	4	2	8	−6	4		0–1	1–2	1–0	—

Source: CONMEBOL
1 April 2025
19:00 UTC−3

Unión (Argentina)	1–0	(Brazil) Cruzeiro
Díaz 90+4'	Report

Estadio 15 de Abril, Santa Fe
Attendance: 10,811
Referee: Andrés Matonte (Uruguay)
3 April 2025
21:00 UTC−5

Mushuc Runa (Ecuador)	3–2	(Chile) Palestino
Haquín 41'; Simisterra 75'; Alonso 82'	Report	Marabel 71'; Carrasco 90+3'

Estadio Olímpico Fernando Guerrero, Riobamba (Note: Mushuc Runa played their home matches at Estadio Olímpico Fernando Guerrero, Riobamba (originally scheduled at Estadio Banco Guayaquil, Quito instead of their regular stadium Estadio COAC Mushuc Runa, Ambato which did not meet CONMEBOL requirements.)
Attendance: 2,918
Referee: Yender Herrera (Venezuela)

9 April 2025
18:00 UTC−4

Palestino (Chile)	2–0	(Argentina) Unión
Carrasco 12' (pen.); Marabel 90+6'	Report

Estadio Nacional Julio Martínez Prádanos, Santiago (Note: Palestino played their home match against Unión at Estadio Nacional Julio Martínez Prádanos, Santiago instead of their regular stadium Estadio Municipal de La Cisterna, Santiago which did not meet CONMEBOL requirements.)
Attendance: 10,295
Referee: Carlos Benítez (Paraguay)
9 April 2025
21:30 UTC−5

Cruzeiro (Brazil)	1–2	(Ecuador) Mushuc Runa
Gabriel 67' (pen.)	Report	Orejuela 29'; Bentaberry 77'

Mineirão, Belo Horizonte
Attendance: 0 (Note: Cruzeiro played their home match against Mushuc Runa behind closed doors as they were punished for improper fan behavior in their 2024 Copa Sudamericana semi-final match against Lanús.)
Referee: Mario Díaz de Vivar (Paraguay)

23 April 2025
21:00 UTC−5

Mushuc Runa (Ecuador)	3–0	(Argentina) Unión
Orejuela 3'; Caicedo 52'; Penilla 90+1'	Report

Estadio Olímpico Fernando Guerrero, Riobamba
Attendance: 2,385
Referee: Augusto Menéndez (Peru)
24 April 2025
20:30 UTC−4

Palestino (Chile)	2–1	(Brazil) Cruzeiro
Benítez 40'; Arias 86'	Report	Eduardo 83'

Estadio Municipal Francisco Sánchez Rumoroso, Coquimbo (Note: Palestino played their home match against Cruzeiro at Estadio Municipal Francisco Sánchez Rumoroso, Coquimbo instead of the originally scheduled Estadio Nacional Julio Martínez Prádanos, Santiago.)
Attendance: 3,930
Referee: Mathías De Armas (Uruguay)

7 May 2025
19:00 UTC−3

Unión (Argentina)	1–2	(Chile) Palestino
Gamba 49'	Report	Marabel 84', 88'

Estadio 15 de Abril, Santa Fe
Attendance: 9,305
Referee: Derlis López (Paraguay)
7 May 2025
19:30 UTC−5

Mushuc Runa (Ecuador)	1–1	(Brazil) Cruzeiro
Orejuela 54'	Report	Díaz 61'

Estadio Olímpico Fernando Guerrero, Riobamba
Attendance: 4,504
Referee: Roberto Pérez (Peru)

13 May 2025
21:30 UTC−3

Unión (Argentina)	0–1	(Ecuador) Mushuc Runa
	Report	Caicedo 45+1'

Estadio 15 de Abril, Santa Fe
Attendance: 8,354
Referee: Yender Herrera (Venezuela)
14 May 2025
21:30 UTC−3

Cruzeiro (Brazil)	2–1	(Chile) Palestino
Bolasie 69'; Gabriel 90'	Report	Martínez 7'

Mineirão, Belo Horizonte
Attendance: 9,698
Referee: Kevin Ortega (Peru)

28 May 2025
21:30 UTC−3

Cruzeiro (Brazil)	0–0	(Argentina) Unión
	Report

Mineirão, Belo Horizonte
Attendance: 20,044
Referee: Blas Romero (Paraguay)
28 May 2025
20:30 UTC−4

Palestino (Chile)	0–2	(Ecuador) Mushuc Runa
	Report	Orejuela 70'; Penilla 88'

Estadio Bicentenario de La Florida, Santiago (Note: Palestino played their home match against Mushuc Runa at Estadio Bicentenario de La Florida, Santiago instead of the originally scheduled Estadio Nacional Julio Martínez Prádanos, Santiago.)
Referee: Hernán Heras (Uruguay)

=== Group F ===
Pos	Team	Pld	W	D	L	GF	GA	GD	Pts	Qualification	FLU	ONC	UES	GVS
1	(Brazil) Fluminense	6	4	1	1	11	2	+9	13	Advance to round of 16	—	2–0	2–0	5–0
2	(Colombia) Once Caldas	6	4	0	2	8	6	+2	12	Advance to knockout round play-offs	0–1	—	1–0	2–1
3	(Chile) Unión Española	6	1	2	3	6	7	−1	5		1–1	0–2	—	4–0
4	(Bolivia) GV San José	6	1	1	4	5	15	−10	4		1–0	2–3	1–1	—

Source: CONMEBOL
1 April 2025
19:30 UTC−5

Once Caldas (Colombia)	0–1	(Brazil) Fluminense
	Report	Cano 31'

Estadio Palogrande, Manizales
Attendance: 20,937
Referee: Maximiliano Ramírez (Argentina)
3 April 2025
18:00 UTC−4

GV San José (Bolivia)	1–1	(Chile) Unión Española
López Pissano 88'	Report	Núñez 82'

Estadio Hernando Siles, La Paz (Note: GV San José played their home matches at Estadio Hernando Siles, La Paz instead of their regular stadium Estadio Jesús Bermúdez, Oruro which did not meet CONMEBOL requirements.)
Attendance: 760
Referee: Bryan Loayza (Ecuador)

9 April 2025
20:30 UTC−4

Unión Española (Chile)	0–2	(Colombia) Once Caldas
	Report	Moreno 57'; A. García 86'

Estadio Sausalito, Viña del Mar (Note: Unión Española played their home match against Once Caldas at Estadio Sausalito, Viña del Mar (originally scheduled at Estadio El Teniente, Rancagua) instead of their regular stadium Estadio Santa Laura-Universidad SEK, Santiago which did not meet CONMEBOL requirements.)
Attendance: 3,102
Referee: Leandro Rey Hilfer (Argentina)
10 April 2025
21:30 UTC−3

Fluminense (Brazil)	5–0	(Bolivia) GV San José
Everaldo 21', 44'; Serna 59'; Cano 73', 79'	Report

Estádio do Maracanã, Rio de Janeiro
Attendance: 20,307
Referee: Roberto Pérez (Peru)

22 April 2025
20:30 UTC−4

GV San José (Bolivia)	2–3	(Colombia) Once Caldas
Becerra 70'; Villamíl 80'	Report	Moreno 42', 73', 88'

Estadio Hernando Siles, La Paz
Attendance: 455
Referee: Nazareno Arasa (Argentina)
23 April 2025 (Note: The Unión Española v Fluminense match, originally scheduled for 22 April 2025, 20:30 local time was rescheduled to 23 April 2025, 18:00 local time.)
18:00 UTC−4

Unión Española (Chile)	1–1	(Brazil) Fluminense
Aránguiz 83'	Report	Nonato 90+3'

Estadio Bicentenario de La Florida, Santiago (Note: Unión Española played their home matches against Fluminense and GV San José at Estadio Bicentenario de La Florida, Santiago (originally scheduled at Estadio El Teniente, Rancagua) instead of their regular stadium Estadio Santa Laura-Universidad SEK, Santiago which did not meet CONMEBOL requirements.)
Attendance: 3,862
Referee: Andrés Matonte (Uruguay)

7 May 2025
21:00 UTC−5

Once Caldas (Colombia)	1–0	(Chile) Unión Española
Palacios 16'	Report

Estadio Palogrande, Manizales
Attendance: 16,991
Referee: Kevin Ortega (Peru)
8 May 2025
20:30 UTC−4

GV San José (Bolivia)	1–0	(Brazil) Fluminense
Calero 69'	Report

Estadio Hernando Siles, La Paz
Attendance: 245
Referee: Alexis Herrera (Venezuela)

14 May 2025
19:00 UTC−3

Fluminense (Brazil)	2–0	(Chile) Unión Española
Keno 47'; Samuel Xavier 77'	Report

Estádio do Maracanã, Rio de Janeiro
Attendance: 15,929
Referee: Yael Falcón Pérez (Argentina)
15 May 2025
21:00 UTC−5

Once Caldas (Colombia)	2–1	(Bolivia) GV San José
Malagón 35'; Beltrán 79'	Report	Roca 58'

Estadio Palogrande, Manizales
Attendance: 15,668
Referee: Augusto Aragón (Ecuador)

29 May 2025
21:30 UTC−3

Fluminense (Brazil)	2–0	(Colombia) Once Caldas
Martinelli 2'; Serna 34'	Report

Estádio do Maracanã, Rio de Janeiro
Attendance: 33,668
Referee: Darío Herrera (Argentina)
29 May 2025
20:30 UTC−4

Unión Española (Chile)	4–0	(Bolivia) GV San José
Aránguiz 17', 58'; Uribe 49'; Véjar 78'	Report

Estadio Bicentenario de La Florida, Santiago
Attendance: 801
Referee: Edina Alves (Brazil)

=== Group G ===
Pos	Team	Pld	W	D	L	GF	GA	GD	Pts	Qualification	LAN	VAS	MEL	APC
1	(Argentina) Lanús	6	3	3	0	9	4	+5	12	Advance to round of 16	—	1–0	3–0	2–2
2	(Brazil) Vasco da Gama	6	2	2	2	8	8	0	8	Advance to knockout round play-offs	0–0	—	3–0	1–0
3	(Peru) Melgar	6	2	1	3	5	10	−5	7		0–1	3–3	—	1–0
4	(Venezuela) Academia Puerto Cabello	6	1	2	3	8	8	0	5		2–2	4–1	0–1	—

Source: CONMEBOL
2 April 2025
17:00 UTC−5

Melgar (Peru)	3–3	(Brazil) Vasco da Gama
Rodríguez 39'; Castro 80'; Cabrera 90'	Report	Coutinho 3'; Vegetti 32', 51'

Estadio Monumental de la UNSA, Arequipa
Attendance: 10,529
Referee: Derlis López (Paraguay)
3 April 2025
18:00 UTC−4

Academia Puerto Cabello (Venezuela)	2–2	(Argentina) Lanús
Paredes 14'; Awudu 50'	Report	Canelo 69'; Aquino 75'

Estadio Misael Delgado, Valencia (Note: Academia Puerto Cabello played their home matches at Estadio Misael Delgado, Valencia instead of their regular stadium Estadio La Bombonerita, Puerto Cabello which did not meet CONMEBOL requirements.)
Attendance: 5,530
Referee: Carlos Ortega (Colombia)

8 April 2025
21:30 UTC−3

Vasco da Gama (Brazil)	1–0	(Venezuela) Academia Puerto Cabello
Vegetti 45+2'	Report

Estádio São Januário, Rio de Janeiro
Attendance: 17,950
Referee: Bryan Loayza (Ecuador)
9 April 2025
21:30 UTC−3

Lanús (Argentina)	3–0	(Peru) Melgar
Moreno 45+1'; Salvio 47'; Orozco 79'	Report

Estadio Ciudad de Lanús, Lanús
Attendance: 4,289
Referee: Mathías De Armas (Uruguay)

22 April 2025
21:30 UTC−3

Vasco da Gama (Brazil)	0–0	(Argentina) Lanús
	Report

Estádio São Januário, Rio de Janeiro
Attendance: 19,291
Referee: Gery Vargas (Bolivia)
22 April 2025
21:00 UTC−5

Melgar (Peru)	1–0	(Venezuela) Academia Puerto Cabello
Barrios 42'	Report

Estadio Monumental de la UNSA, Arequipa
Attendance: 4,922
Referee: Juan Carlos Andrade (Ecuador)

6 May 2025
21:00 UTC−5

Melgar (Peru)	0–1	(Argentina) Lanús
	Report	Medina 84'

Estadio Monumental de la UNSA, Arequipa
Attendance: 5,693
Referee: Carlos Ortega (Colombia)
7 May 2025
18:00 UTC−4

Academia Puerto Cabello (Venezuela)	4–1	(Brazil) Vasco da Gama
Paredes 28' (pen.), 65'; Padrón 49'; Guerrero 60'	Report	João Victor 38'

Estadio Misael Delgado, Valencia
Attendance: 2,650
Referee: José Méndez (Paraguay)

13 May 2025
21:30 UTC−3

Lanús (Argentina)	1–0	(Brazil) Vasco da Gama
Carrera 53'	Report

Estadio Ciudad de Lanús, Lanús
Attendance: 6,555
Referee: Carlos Benítez (Paraguay)
13 May 2025
20:30 UTC−4

Academia Puerto Cabello (Venezuela)	0–1	(Peru) Melgar
	Report	Cabrera 51' (pen.)

Estadio Misael Delgado, Valencia
Attendance: 4,890
Referee: Juan Carlos Andrade (Ecuador)

27 May 2025
19:00 UTC−3

Lanús (Argentina)	2–2	(Venezuela) Academia Puerto Cabello
Salvio 12'; Moreno 21'	Report	Paredes 15', 62' (pen.)

Estadio Ciudad de Lanús, Lanús
Attendance: 3,131
Referee: Ivo Méndez (Bolivia)
27 May 2025
19:00 UTC−3

Vasco da Gama (Brazil)	3–0	(Peru) Melgar
Rayan 3'; Paulo Henrique 33'; Vegetti 44'	Report

Estádio São Januário, Rio de Janeiro
Attendance: 15,971
Referee: Jhon Ospina (Colombia)

=== Group H ===
Pos	Team	Pld	W	D	L	GF	GA	GD	Pts	Qualification	CIE	CAM	CAR	DIQ
1	(Peru) Cienciano	6	2	4	0	12	6	+6	10	Advance to round of 16	—	0–0	3–1	4–0
2	(Brazil) Atlético Mineiro	6	2	3	1	11	6	+5	9	Advance to knockout round play-offs	1–1	—	3–1	4–0
3	(Venezuela) Caracas	6	2	2	2	9	11	−2	8		2–2	1–1	—	2–1
4	(Chile) Deportes Iquique	6	1	1	4	7	16	−9	4		2–2	3–2	1–2	—

Source: CONMEBOL
1 April 2025
19:00 UTC−3

Deportes Iquique (Chile)	1–2	(Venezuela) Caracas
Puch 4' (pen.)	Report	Echenique 33'; Aguilar 37'

Estadio Tierra de Campeones, Iquique
Attendance: 6,028
Referee: Augusto Aragón (Ecuador)
1 April 2025
19:30 UTC−5

Cienciano (Peru)	0–0	(Brazil) Atlético Mineiro
	Report

Estadio Garcilaso, Cusco
Attendance: 15,683
Referee: Leandro Rey Hilfer (Argentina)

8 April 2025
18:00 UTC−4

Caracas (Venezuela)	2–2	(Peru) Cienciano
Reinoso 8'; Rondón 90+9'	Report	Garcés 41', 66'

Estadio Olímpico de la UCV, Caracas
Attendance: 3,782
Referee: José Ortiz (Colombia)
10 April 2025
21:30 UTC−3

Atlético Mineiro (Brazil)	4–0	(Chile) Deportes Iquique
Rony 1'; Hulk 11' (pen.); Natanael 35'; Scarpa 66' (pen.)	Report

Mineirão, Belo Horizonte (Note: Atlético Mineiro played their home match against Deportes Iquique at Mineirão, Belo Horizonte instead of their regular stadium Arena MRV, Belo Horizonte.)
Attendance: 0 (Note: Atlético Mineiro played their home matches against Deportes Iquique and Caracas behind closed doors as they were punished for improper fan behavior in their 2024 Copa Libertadores semi-final match against River Plate.)
Referee: Juan Benítez (Paraguay)

23 April 2025
20:30 UTC−4

Caracas (Venezuela)	1–1	(Brazil) Atlético Mineiro
De Santis 66'	Report	Rodríguez 24' (o.g.)

Estadio Olímpico de la UCV, Caracas
Attendance: 4,060
Referee: Darío Herrera (Argentina)
24 April 2025
20:30 UTC−4

Deportes Iquique (Chile)	2–2	(Peru) Cienciano
Pino 29'; Fuentes 65'	Report	Gentile 24'; Garcés 90+9'

Estadio Tierra de Campeones, Iquique
Attendance: 5,032
Referee: Maximiliano Ramírez (Argentina)

8 May 2025
18:00 UTC−4

Deportes Iquique (Chile)	3–2	(Brazil) Atlético Mineiro
Ramos 34', 53'; Orellana 60'	Report	Rubens 10'; Bernard 78'

Estadio Tierra de Campeones, Iquique
Attendance: 5,508
Referee: Leandro Rey Hilfer (Argentina)
8 May 2025
21:00 UTC−5

Cienciano (Peru)	3–1	(Venezuela) Caracas
Gentile 15'; Valoyes 67'; Noronha 83'	Report	Hernández 34'

Estadio Garcilaso, Cusco
Referee: Alex Cajas (Ecuador)

15 May 2025
21:30 UTC−3

Atlético Mineiro (Brazil)	3–1	(Venezuela) Caracas
Edet 28' (o.g.); Cuello 48'; Rony 77'	Report	De Santis 59' (pen.)

Arena MRV, Belo Horizonte
Attendance: 0
Referee: José Burgos (Uruguay)
15 May 2025
21:00 UTC−5

Cienciano (Peru)	4–0	(Chile) Deportes Iquique
Gentile 21', 41'; Noronha 39', 48'	Report

Estadio Garcilaso, Cusco
Attendance: 13,528
Referee: David Ojeda (Paraguay)

29 May 2025
21:30 UTC−3

Atlético Mineiro (Brazil)	1–1	(Peru) Cienciano
Lyanco 43'	Report	Cueva 45+7' (pen.)

Arena MRV, Belo Horizonte
Attendance: 26,426
Referee: Juan Benítez (Paraguay)
29 May 2025
20:30 UTC−4

Caracas (Venezuela)	2–1	(Chile) Deportes Iquique
Covea 26'; Tegues 34'	Report	González 54'

Estadio Olímpico de la UCV, Caracas
Attendance: 2,933
Referee: Alex Cajas (Ecuador)
