= 2025 Copa Sudamericana =

24th Copa Sudamericana edition

Copa CONMEBOL Sudamericana 2025
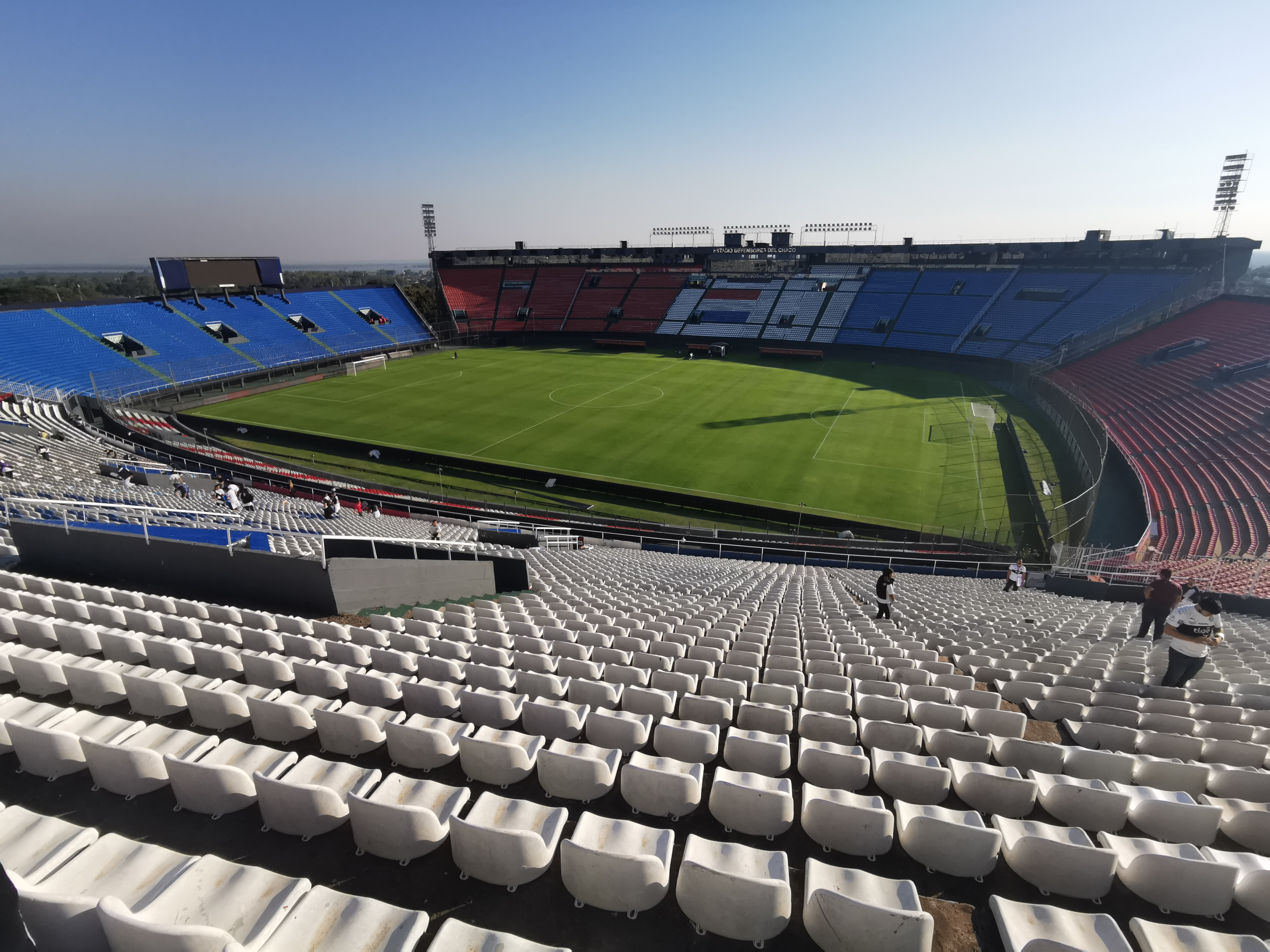
- The Estadio Defensores del Chaco in Asunción hosted the final

Tournament details
- Dates: 4 March – 22 November 2025
- Teams: 44+12 (from 10 associations)

Final positions
- Champions: (Argentina) Lanús (2nd title)
- Runners-up: (Brazil) Atlético Mineiro

Tournament statistics
- Matches played: 157
- Goals scored: 374 (2.38 per match)
- Top scorer(s): Dayro Moreno (Once Caldas) (10 goals)

The 2025 Copa CONMEBOL Sudamericana was the 24th edition of the CONMEBOL Sudamericana (also referred to as the Copa Sudamericana), South America's secondary club football tournament organized by CONMEBOL. The competition began on 4 March and ended on 22 November 2025, with the final played at Estadio Defensores del Chaco in Asunción, Paraguay. Although Estadio Ramón Tahuichi Aguilera in Santa Cruz de la Sierra, Bolivia was originally selected as the host stadium for the final match, CONMEBOL confirmed the change of host city on 11 September 2025, due to delays in the works to adapt the stadium to host the event.

Argentine club Lanús were the champions, winning their second Copa Sudamericana title after defeating Brazilian side Atlético Mineiro 5–4 on kicks from the penalty mark following a 0–0 draw after extra time in the final. As winners of the 2025 Copa Sudamericana, Lanús earned the right to play against the winners of the 2025 Copa Libertadores in the 2026 Recopa Sudamericana. They also automatically qualified for the 2026 Copa Libertadores group stage.

Argentine club Racing were the titleholders, but they did not defend their title since they qualified for the 2025 Copa Libertadores group stage as Copa Sudamericana champions and advanced to the knockout stage of that competition.

== Teams ==
The following 44 teams from the 10 CONMEBOL associations qualified for the tournament:

- Argentina and Brazil: 6 berths each
- All other associations: 4 berths each

The entry stage was determined as follows:

- Group stage: 12 teams (teams from Argentina and Brazil)
- First stage: 32 teams (teams from all other associations)

Association	Team (Berth)	Entry stage	Qualification method
Argentina (6 berths)	Godoy Cruz (Argentina 1)	Group stage	2024 Copa de la Liga Profesional and Primera División aggregate table best team not qualified for 2025 Copa Libertadores
Argentina (6 berths)	Independiente (Argentina 2)	Group stage	2024 Copa de la Liga Profesional and Primera División aggregate table 2nd best team not qualified for 2025 Copa Libertadores
Argentina (6 berths)	Huracán (Argentina 3)	Group stage	2024 Copa de la Liga Profesional and Primera División aggregate table 3rd best team not qualified for 2025 Copa Libertadores
Argentina (6 berths)	Unión (Argentina 4)	Group stage	2024 Copa de la Liga Profesional and Primera División aggregate table 4th best team not qualified for 2025 Copa Libertadores
Argentina (6 berths)	Lanús (Argentina 5)	Group stage	2024 Copa de la Liga Profesional and Primera División aggregate table 5th best team not qualified for 2025 Copa Libertadores
Argentina (6 berths)	Defensa y Justicia (Argentina 6)	Group stage	2024 Copa de la Liga Profesional and Primera División aggregate table 6th best team not qualified for 2025 Copa Libertadores
Bolivia (4 berths)	Universitario de Vinto (Bolivia 1)	First stage	2024 Apertura runners-up
Bolivia (4 berths)	Aurora (Bolivia 2)	First stage	2024 Primera División aggregate table best team not qualified for 2025 Copa Libertadores
Bolivia (4 berths)	Nacional Potosí (Bolivia 3)	First stage	2024 Primera División aggregate table 2nd best team not qualified for 2025 Copa Libertadores
Bolivia (4 berths)	GV San José (Bolivia 4)	First stage	2024 Primera División aggregate table 3rd best team not qualified for 2025 Copa Libertadores
Brazil (6 berths)	Cruzeiro (Brazil 1)	Group stage	2024 Campeonato Brasileiro Série A best team not qualified for 2025 Copa Libertadores
Brazil (6 berths)	Vasco da Gama (Brazil 2)	Group stage	2024 Campeonato Brasileiro Série A 2nd best team not qualified for 2025 Copa Libertadores
Brazil (6 berths)	Vitória (Brazil 3)	Group stage	2024 Campeonato Brasileiro Série A 3rd best team not qualified for 2025 Copa Libertadores
Brazil (6 berths)	Atlético Mineiro (Brazil 4)	Group stage	2024 Campeonato Brasileiro Série A 4th best team not qualified for 2025 Copa Libertadores
Brazil (6 berths)	Fluminense (Brazil 5)	Group stage	2024 Campeonato Brasileiro Série A 5th best team not qualified for 2025 Copa Libertadores
Brazil (6 berths)	Grêmio (Brazil 6)	Group stage	2024 Campeonato Brasileiro Série A 6th best team not qualified for 2025 Copa Libertadores
Chile (4 berths)	Palestino (Chile 1)	First stage	2024 Primera División best team not qualified for 2025 Copa Libertadores
Chile (4 berths)	Universidad Católica (Chile 2)	First stage	2024 Primera División 2nd best team not qualified for 2025 Copa Libertadores
Chile (4 berths)	Unión Española (Chile 3)	First stage	2024 Primera División 3rd best team not qualified for 2025 Copa Libertadores
Chile (4 berths)	Everton (Chile 4)	First stage	2024 Primera División 4th best team not qualified for 2025 Copa Libertadores
Colombia (4 berths)	Millonarios (Colombia 1)	First stage	2024 Primera A aggregate table best team not qualified for 2025 Copa Libertadores
Colombia (4 berths)	Once Caldas (Colombia 2)	First stage	2024 Primera A aggregate table 2nd best team not qualified for 2025 Copa Libertadores
Colombia (4 berths)	Junior (Colombia 3)	First stage	2024 Primera A aggregate table 3rd best team not qualified for 2025 Copa Libertadores
Colombia (4 berths)	América de Cali (Colombia 4)	First stage	2024 Primera A aggregate table 4th best team not qualified for 2025 Copa Libertadores
Ecuador (4 berths)	Universidad Católica (Ecuador 1)	First stage	2024 Serie A aggregate table best team not qualified for 2025 Copa Libertadores
Ecuador (4 berths)	Aucas (Ecuador 2)	First stage	2024 Serie A aggregate table 2nd best team not qualified for 2025 Copa Libertadores
Ecuador (4 berths)	Mushuc Runa (Ecuador 3)	First stage	2024 Serie A aggregate table 3rd best team not qualified for 2025 Copa Libertadores
Ecuador (4 berths)	Orense (Ecuador 4)	First stage	2024 Serie A aggregate table 4th best team not qualified for 2025 Copa Libertadores
Paraguay (4 berths)	Guaraní (Paraguay 1)	First stage	2024 Primera División aggregate table best team not qualified for 2025 Copa Libertadores
Paraguay (4 berths)	2 de Mayo (Paraguay 2)	First stage	2024 Primera División aggregate table 2nd best team not qualified for 2025 Copa Libertadores
Paraguay (4 berths)	Sportivo Luqueño (Paraguay 3)	First stage	2024 Primera División aggregate table 3rd best team not qualified for 2025 Copa Libertadores
Paraguay (4 berths)	Sportivo Ameliano (Paraguay 4)	First stage	2024 Primera División aggregate table 4th best team not qualified for 2025 Copa Libertadores
Peru (4 berths)	Cusco (Peru 1)	First stage	2024 Liga 1 aggregate table best team not qualified for 2025 Copa Libertadores
Peru (4 berths)	Cienciano (Peru 2)	First stage	2024 Liga 1 aggregate table 2nd best team not qualified for 2025 Copa Libertadores
Peru (4 berths)	Atlético Grau (Peru 3)	First stage	2024 Liga 1 aggregate table 3rd best team not qualified for 2025 Copa Libertadores
Peru (4 berths)	ADT (Peru 4)	First stage	2024 Liga 1 aggregate table 4th best team not qualified for 2025 Copa Libertadores
Uruguay (4 berths)	Cerro Largo (Uruguay 1)	First stage	2024 Primera División aggregate table best team not qualified for 2025 Copa Libertadores
Uruguay (4 berths)	Danubio (Uruguay 2)	First stage	2024 Primera División aggregate table 2nd best team not qualified for 2025 Copa Libertadores
Uruguay (4 berths)	Racing (Uruguay 3)	First stage	2024 Primera División aggregate table 3rd best team not qualified for 2025 Copa Libertadores
Uruguay (4 berths)	Montevideo Wanderers (Uruguay 4)	First stage	2024 Primera División aggregate table 4th best team not qualified for 2025 Copa Libertadores
Venezuela (4 berths)	Metropolitanos (Venezuela 1)	First stage	2024 Apertura runners-up
Venezuela (4 berths)	Deportivo La Guaira (Venezuela 2)	First stage	2024 Primera División aggregate table best team not qualified for 2025 Copa Libertadores
Venezuela (4 berths)	Academia Puerto Cabello (Venezuela 3)	First stage	2024 Primera División aggregate table 3rd best team not qualified for 2025 Copa Libertadores
Venezuela (4 berths)	Caracas (Venezuela 4)	First stage	2024 Primera División aggregate table 4th best team not qualified for 2025 Copa Libertadores

A further 12 teams eliminated from the 2025 Copa Libertadores were transferred to the Copa Sudamericana, entering the group stage and the knockout round play-offs.

Teams eliminated in third stage	Entry stage
(Chile) Deportes Iquique	Group stage
(Uruguay) Boston River	Group stage
(Peru) Melgar	Group stage
(Brazil) Corinthians	Group stage
Third-placed teams in group stage	Entry stage
Universidad de Chile	Knockout round play-offs
(Ecuador) Independiente del Valle	Knockout round play-offs
(Argentina) Central Córdoba	Knockout round play-offs
(Peru) Alianza Lima	Knockout round play-offs
(Colombia) Atlético Bucaramanga	Knockout round play-offs
(Brazil) Bahia	Knockout round play-offs
(Bolivia) Bolívar	Knockout round play-offs
(Bolivia) San Antonio Bulo Bulo	Knockout round play-offs

== Schedule ==
The schedule of the competition was as follows:

Schedule for 2025 Copa Sudamericana
Stage	Draw date	First leg	Second leg
First stage	19 December 2024	4–6 March 2025	
Group stage	17 March 2025	Matchday 1: 1–3 April 2025; Matchday 2: 8–10 April 2025; Matchday 3: 22–24 April 2025; Matchday 4: 6–8 May 2025; Matchday 5: 13–15 May 2025; Matchday 6: 27–29 May 2025	
Knockout round play-offs	No draw	15–17 July 2025	22–24 July 2025
Round of 16	2 June 2025	12–14 August 2025	19–21 August 2025
Quarter-finals	2 June 2025	16–18 September 2025	23–25 September 2025
Semi-finals	2 June 2025	21–23 October 2025	28–30 October 2025
Final	2 June 2025	22 November 2025 at Estadio Defensores del Chaco, Asunción	

== Draws ==
Location of teams of the 2025 Copa Sudamericana.
Brown: Group A; Red: Group B; Orange: Group C;
Yellow: Group D; Green: Group E; Blue: Group F;
Purple: Group G; Pink: Group H; White: First stage;
Turquoise: Knockout round play-offs entrants.
(L) Teams transferred from the 2025 Copa Libertadores.

The draw for the first stage was held on 19 December 2024, 12:00 PYT (UTC−3), at the CONMEBOL Convention Centre in Luque, Paraguay.

For the first stage, the 32 teams involved were divided into eight pots according to their national association. The 32 teams were drawn into 16 ties, with the four teams from each national association being drawn against a rival from the same association in two ties per association. The first team drawn in each tie hosted the match. The draw for the group stage was held on 17 March 2025, 20:00 PYT (UTC−3), at the CONMEBOL Convention Centre in Luque, Paraguay.

Teams were seeded by their CONMEBOL Clubs ranking as of 16 December 2024 (shown in parentheses), taking into account the following three factors:

1. Performance in the last 10 years, taking into account Copa Libertadores and Copa Sudamericana results in the period 2015–2024.
2. Historical coefficient, taking into account Copa Libertadores and Copa Sudamericana results in the period 1960–2014 and 2002–2014 respectively.
3. Local tournament champion, with bonus points awarded to domestic league champions of the last 10 years.

For the group stage, the 32 teams were drawn into eight groups (Groups A–H) of four containing a team from each of the four pots. The four losers of the Copa Libertadores third stage were seeded into Pot 4. Teams from the same association could not be drawn into the same group.

Group stage draw
Pot 1	Pot 2	Pot 3	Pot 4
(Brazil) Atlético Mineiro (7); (Brazil) Fluminense (10); (Brazil) Grêmio (11); (Argentina) Independiente (22); (Brazil) Cruzeiro (26); (Argentina) Lanús (30); (Argentina) Defensa y Justicia (33); (Colombia) América de Cali (40)	(Paraguay) Guaraní (47); (Chile) Palestino (55); (Venezuela) Caracas (58); (Brazil) Vasco da Gama (66); (Argentina) Huracán (70); (Ecuador) Universidad Católica (71); (Chile) Unión Española (79); (Argentina) Godoy Cruz (80)	(Colombia) Once Caldas (96); (Uruguay) Racing (100); (Argentina) Unión (101); (Bolivia) Nacional Potosí (113); (Peru) Cienciano (118); (Paraguay) Sportivo Luqueño (123); (Venezuela) Academia Puerto Cabello (159); (Uruguay) Cerro Largo (192)	(Ecuador) Mushuc Runa (232); (Peru) Atlético Grau (250); (Brazil) Vitória (256); (Bolivia) GV San José (No rank); (Chile) Deportes Iquique (153); (Uruguay) Boston River (206); (Peru) Melgar (51); (Brazil) Corinthians (18)

Notes

1. ^{CLQ3} The Copa Libertadores third stage losers were seeded in Pot 4.

The draw for the round of 16 was held on 2 June 2025, 12:00 PYT (UTC−3) at the CONMEBOL headquarters in Luque, Paraguay. For the round of 16, the 16 teams were drawn into eight ties (A–H) between a Copa Sudamericana group winner (Pot 1) and a knockout round play-offs winner (Pot 2), with the group winners hosting the second leg. Teams from the same association or the same group could be drawn into the same tie (Regulations Article 2.2.3.2).

== First stage ==
In the first stage, each tie was played on a single-leg basis, with the winner being decided in a penalty shoot-out in case of a draw after 90 minutes.

The 16 winners of the first stage advanced to the group stage to join the 12 teams directly qualified for that stage (six from Argentina and six from Brazil), and four teams transferred from the Copa Libertadores (the four teams eliminated in the third stage of qualifying).

Team 1	Score	Team 2
Universitario de Vinto (Bolivia)	0–1	(Bolivia) Nacional Potosí
Aurora (Bolivia)	0–1	(Bolivia) GV San José
Universidad Católica (Chile)	1–1 (4–5 p)	(Chile) Palestino
Unión Española (Chile)	2–2 (3–1 p)	(Chile) Everton
Junior (Colombia)	2–2 (3–4 p)	(Colombia) América de Cali
Once Caldas (Colombia)	1–0	(Colombia) Millonarios
Mushuc Runa (Ecuador)	2–1	(Ecuador) Orense
Universidad Católica (Ecuador)	0–0 (4–2 p)	(Ecuador) Aucas
Sportivo Luqueño (Paraguay)	2–0	(Paraguay) Sportivo Ameliano
Guaraní (Paraguay)	2–0	(Paraguay) 2 de Mayo
ADT (Peru)	1–1 (5–6 p)	(Peru) Cienciano
Atlético Grau (Peru)	0–0 (4–2 p)	(Peru) Cusco
Racing (Uruguay)	0–0 (4–2 p)	(Uruguay) Montevideo Wanderers
Cerro Largo (Uruguay)	2–2 (4–3 p)	(Uruguay) Danubio
Academia Puerto Cabello (Venezuela)	3–0	(Venezuela) Metropolitanos
Deportivo La Guaira (Venezuela)	0–2	(Venezuela) Caracas

== Group stage ==
In the group stage, each group was played on a home-and-away round-robin basis. Teams were ranked according to the following criteria: 1. Points (3 points for a win, 1 point for a draw, and 0 points for a loss); 2. Goal difference; 3. Goals scored; 4. Away goals scored; 5. CONMEBOL ranking (Regulations Article 2.4.2).

The winners of each group advanced to the round of 16 of the final stages, whilst the runners-up of each group advanced to the knockout round play-offs of the final stages.

=== Group A ===
Pos	Team	Pld	W	D	L	GF	GA	GD	Pts	Qualification	IND	GUA	BOS	NAP
1	(Argentina) Independiente	6	4	0	2	16	6	+10	12	Round of 16	—	1–0	2–1	7–0
2	(Paraguay) Guaraní	6	2	2	2	9	12	−3	8	Knockout round play-offs	2–1	—	0–5	2–0
3	(Uruguay) Boston River	6	2	1	3	12	14	−2	7		1–5	3–3	—	2–1
4	(Bolivia) Nacional Potosí	6	2	1	3	8	13	−5	7		2–0	2–2	3–0	—

Source: CONMEBOL

=== Group B ===
Pos	Team	Pld	W	D	L	GF	GA	GD	Pts	Qualification	UCA	CRL	VIT	DYJ
1	(Ecuador) Universidad Católica	6	4	2	0	12	5	+7	14	Round of 16	—	3–1	1–0	3–1
2	(Uruguay) Cerro Largo	6	2	1	3	5	8	−3	7	Knockout round play-offs	1–3	—	0–1	0–0
3	(Brazil) Vitória	6	1	3	2	3	4	−1	6		1–1	0–1	—	1–1
4	(Argentina) Defensa y Justicia	6	0	4	2	4	7	−3	4		1–1	1–2	0–0	—

Source: CONMEBOL

=== Group C ===
Pos	Team	Pld	W	D	L	GF	GA	GD	Pts	Qualification	HUR	AME	COR	RCM
1	(Argentina) Huracán	6	4	2	0	11	2	+9	14	Round of 16	—	0–0	1–0	5–0
2	(Colombia) América de Cali	6	1	5	0	6	4	+2	8	Knockout round play-offs	0–0	—	1–1	1–1
3	(Brazil) Corinthians	6	2	2	2	5	5	0	8		1–2	1–1	—	1–0
4	(Uruguay) Racing	6	0	1	5	3	14	−11	1		1–3	1–3	0–1	—

Source: CONMEBOL

=== Group D ===
Pos	Team	Pld	W	D	L	GF	GA	GD	Pts	Qualification	GOD	GRE	CAG	SLU
1	(Argentina) Godoy Cruz	6	3	3	0	10	5	+5	12	Round of 16	—	2–2	2–2	2–0
2	(Brazil) Grêmio	6	3	3	0	8	4	+4	12	Knockout round play-offs	1–1	—	2–0	1–0
3	(Peru) Atlético Grau	6	0	4	2	5	9	−4	4		0–2	0–0	—	2–2
4	(Paraguay) Sportivo Luqueño	6	0	2	4	4	9	−5	2		0–1	1–2	1–1	—

Source: CONMEBOL

=== Group E ===
Pos	Team	Pld	W	D	L	GF	GA	GD	Pts	Qualification	MUS	PAL	CRU	UNI
1	(Ecuador) Mushuc Runa	6	5	1	0	12	4	+8	16	Round of 16	—	3–2	1–1	3–0
2	(Chile) Palestino	6	3	0	3	9	9	0	9	Knockout round play-offs	0–2	—	2–1	2–0
3	(Brazil) Cruzeiro	6	1	2	3	5	7	−2	5		1–2	2–1	—	0–0
4	(Argentina) Unión	6	1	1	4	2	8	−6	4		0–1	1–2	1–0	—

Source: CONMEBOL

=== Group F ===
Pos	Team	Pld	W	D	L	GF	GA	GD	Pts	Qualification	FLU	ONC	UES	GVS
1	(Brazil) Fluminense	6	4	1	1	11	2	+9	13	Round of 16	—	2–0	2–0	5–0
2	(Colombia) Once Caldas	6	4	0	2	8	6	+2	12	Knockout round play-offs	0–1	—	1–0	2–1
3	(Chile) Unión Española	6	1	2	3	6	7	−1	5		1–1	0–2	—	4–0
4	(Bolivia) GV San José	6	1	1	4	5	15	−10	4		1–0	2–3	1–1	—

Source: CONMEBOL

=== Group G ===
Pos	Team	Pld	W	D	L	GF	GA	GD	Pts	Qualification	LAN	VAS	MEL	APC
1	(Argentina) Lanús	6	3	3	0	9	4	+5	12	Round of 16	—	1–0	3–0	2–2
2	(Brazil) Vasco da Gama	6	2	2	2	8	8	0	8	Knockout round play-offs	0–0	—	3–0	1–0
3	(Peru) Melgar	6	2	1	3	5	10	−5	7		0–1	3–3	—	1–0
4	(Venezuela) Academia Puerto Cabello	6	1	2	3	8	8	0	5		2–2	4–1	0–1	—

Source: CONMEBOL

=== Group H ===
Pos	Team	Pld	W	D	L	GF	GA	GD	Pts	Qualification	CIE	CAM	CAR	DIQ
1	(Peru) Cienciano	6	2	4	0	12	6	+6	10	Round of 16	—	0–0	3–1	4–0
2	(Brazil) Atlético Mineiro	6	2	3	1	11	6	+5	9	Knockout round play-offs	1–1	—	3–1	4–0
3	(Venezuela) Caracas	6	2	2	2	9	11	−2	8		2–2	1–1	—	2–1
4	(Chile) Deportes Iquique	6	1	1	4	7	16	−9	4		2–2	3–2	1–2	—

Source: CONMEBOL

== Final stages ==
Starting from the knockout round play-offs, the teams played a single-elimination tournament with the following rules:

- In the knockout round play-offs, round of 16, quarter-finals and semi-finals, each tie was played on a home-and-away two-legged basis, with the higher-seeded team hosting the second leg (Regulations Article 2.2.3). If tied on aggregate, extra time was not played, and a penalty shoot-out was used to determine the winners (Regulations Article 2.4.4).
- The final was played as a single match at a venue pre-selected by CONMEBOL, with the higher-seeded team designated as the "home" team for administrative purposes (Regulations Article 2.2.6). If tied after regulation, 30 minutes of extra time was played. If still tied after extra time, a penalty shoot-out was used to determine the winners (Regulations Article 2.4.5).

=== Seeding ===
For the final stages, the teams were seeded according to their results in the group stage, with the Copa Sudamericana group winners seeded 1–8, the Copa Sudamericana group runners-up seeded 9–16, and the Copa Libertadores group third-placed teams seeded 17–24. For the round of 16 draw, the seeds 1–8 made up Pot 1, and the eight knockout round play-offs winners (seeds 9–24) made up Pot 2, keeping their seed. Teams from the same association could play each other from the knockout round play-offs onwards.

Seed	Grp	Team	Pld	W	D	L	GF	GA	GD	Pts	Qualification
1	SE1	(Ecuador) Mushuc Runa	6	5	1	0	12	4	+8	16	Round of 16
2	SC1	(Argentina) Huracán	6	4	2	0	11	2	+9	14	Round of 16
3	SB1	(Ecuador) Universidad Católica	6	4	2	0	12	5	+7	14	Round of 16
4	SF1	(Brazil) Fluminense	6	4	1	1	11	2	+9	13	Round of 16
5	SA1	(Argentina) Independiente	6	4	0	2	16	6	+10	12	Round of 16
6	SD1	(Argentina) Godoy Cruz	6	3	3	0	10	5	+5	12	Round of 16
7	SG1	(Argentina) Lanús	6	3	3	0	9	4	+5	12	Round of 16
8	SH1	(Peru) Cienciano	6	2	4	0	12	6	+6	10	Round of 16
9	SD2	(Brazil) Grêmio	6	3	3	0	8	4	+4	12	Play-off Match A
10	SF2	(Colombia) Once Caldas	6	4	0	2	8	6	+2	12	Play-off Match B
11	SH2	(Brazil) Atlético Mineiro	6	2	3	1	11	6	+5	9	Play-off Match C
12	SE2	(Chile) Palestino	6	3	0	3	9	9	0	9	Play-off Match D
13	SC2	(Colombia) América de Cali	6	1	5	0	6	4	+2	8	Play-off Match E
14	SG2	(Brazil) Vasco da Gama	6	2	2	2	8	8	0	8	Play-off Match F
15	SA2	(Paraguay) Guaraní	6	2	2	2	9	12	−3	8	Play-off Match G
16	SB2	(Uruguay) Cerro Largo	6	2	1	3	5	8	−3	7	Play-off Match H
17	LC	(Argentina) Central Córdoba	6	3	2	1	7	7	0	11	Play-off Match H
18	LA	Universidad de Chile	6	3	1	2	8	6	+2	10	Play-off Match G
19	LB	(Ecuador) Independiente del Valle	6	2	2	2	8	11	−3	8	Play-off Match F
20	LF	(Brazil) Bahia	6	2	1	3	5	7	−2	7	Play-off Match E
21	LG	(Bolivia) Bolívar	6	2	0	4	12	11	+1	6	Play-off Match D
22	LE	(Colombia) Atlético Bucaramanga	6	1	3	2	6	10	−4	6	Play-off Match C
23	LH	(Bolivia) San Antonio Bulo Bulo	6	2	0	4	5	15	−10	6	Play-off Match B
24	LD	(Peru) Alianza Lima	6	1	2	3	7	11	−4	5	Play-off Match A

Source: CONMEBOL Sudamericana, CONMEBOL Libertadores
Rules for classification: 1) Higher position in group; 2) Points; 3) Goal difference; 4) Goals scored; 5) Away goals scored; 6) CONMEBOL ranking (Regulations Article 2.4.3).

=== Bracket ===
The bracket was decided based on the round of 16 draw, which was held on 2 June 2025.

Knockout round play-offs
24	(Peru) Alianza Lima	2	1	3
9	(Brazil) Grêmio	0	1	1
18	Universidad de Chile	5	1	6
15	(Paraguay) Guaraní	0	2	2
17	(Argentina) Central Córdoba	0	3	3
16	(Uruguay) Cerro Largo	0	0	0
20	(Brazil) Bahia	0	0	0
13	(Colombia) América de Cali	0	2	2
19	(Ecuador) Independiente del Valle	4	1	5
14	(Brazil) Vasco da Gama	0	1	1
23	(Bolivia) San Antonio Bulo Bulo	0	0	0
10	(Colombia) Once Caldas	3	4	7
21	(Bolivia) Bolívar	3	3	6
12	(Chile) Palestino	0	0	0
22	(Colombia) Atlético Bucaramanga	0	1	1 (1)
11	(Brazil) Atlético Mineiro (p)	1	0	1 (3)

Round of 16
24	(Peru) Alianza Lima	2	2	4
3	(Ecuador) Universidad Católica	0	1	1
18	Universidad de Chile	1	1	2
5	(Argentina) Independiente (DQ)	0	1	1
17	(Argentina) Central Córdoba	1	0	1 (2)
7	(Argentina) Lanús (p)	0	1	1 (4)
13	(Colombia) América de Cali	1	0	1
4	(Brazil) Fluminense	2	2	4
19	(Ecuador) Independiente del Valle (p)	1	1	2 (4)
1	(Ecuador) Mushuc Runa	0	2	2 (2)
10	(Colombia) Once Caldas	1	3	4
2	(Argentina) Huracán	0	1	1
21	(Bolivia) Bolívar	2	2	4
8	(Peru) Cienciano	0	0	0
11	(Brazil) Atlético Mineiro	2	1	3
6	(Argentina) Godoy Cruz	1	0	1

Quarter-finals
24	(Peru) Alianza Lima	0	1	1
18	Universidad de Chile	0	2	2
7	(Argentina) Lanús	1	1	2
4	(Brazil) Fluminense	0	1	1
19	(Ecuador) Independiente del Valle (p)	0	2	2 (5)
10	(Colombia) Once Caldas	2	0	2 (4)
21	(Bolivia) Bolívar	2	0	2
11	(Brazil) Atlético Mineiro	2	1	3

Semi-finals
18	Universidad de Chile	2	0	2
7	(Argentina) Lanús	2	1	3
19	(Ecuador) Independiente del Valle	1	1	2
11	(Brazil) Atlético Mineiro	1	3	4

Final
22 November – Asunción
7	(Argentina) Lanús (p)	0 (5)
11	(Brazil) Atlético Mineiro	0 (4)

=== Knockout round play-offs ===
Team 1	Agg.	Team 2	1st leg	2nd leg
Alianza Lima (Peru)	3–1	(Brazil) Grêmio	2–0	1–1
San Antonio Bulo Bulo (Bolivia)	0–7	(Colombia) Once Caldas	0–3	0–4
Atlético Bucaramanga (Colombia)	1–1 (1–3 p)	(Brazil) Atlético Mineiro	0–1	1–0
Bolívar (Bolivia)	6–0	(Chile) Palestino	3–0	3–0
Bahia (Brazil)	0–2	(Colombia) América de Cali	0–0	0–2
Independiente del Valle (Ecuador)	5–1	(Brazil) Vasco da Gama	4–0	1–1
Universidad de Chile	6–2	(Paraguay) Guaraní	5–0	1–2
Central Córdoba (Argentina)	3–0	(Uruguay) Cerro Largo	0–0	3–0

=== Round of 16 ===
Team 1	Agg.	Team 2	1st leg	2nd leg
Alianza Lima (Peru)	4–1	(Ecuador) Universidad Católica	2–0	2–1
Bolívar (Bolivia)	4–0	(Peru) Cienciano	2–0	2–0
Once Caldas (Colombia)	4–1	(Argentina) Huracán	1–0	3–1
América de Cali (Colombia)	1–4	(Brazil) Fluminense	1–2	0–2
Central Córdoba (Argentina)	1–1 (2–4 p)	(Argentina) Lanús	1–0	0–1
Independiente del Valle (Ecuador)	2–2 (4–2 p)	(Ecuador) Mushuc Runa	1–0	1–2
Atlético Mineiro (Brazil)	3–1	(Argentina) Godoy Cruz	2–1	1–0
Universidad de Chile	2–1	(Argentina) Independiente	1–0	1–1 (Abd.) (Note: Match abandoned in the 47th minute of play with the score at 1–1 due to lack of security conditions. The matter was referred by CONMEBOL to its Disciplinary Commission, which subsequently disqualified Independiente from the competition.)

=== Quarter-finals ===
Team 1	Agg.	Team 2	1st leg	2nd leg
Alianza Lima (Peru)	1–2	Universidad de Chile	0–0	1–2
Bolívar (Bolivia)	2–3	(Brazil) Atlético Mineiro	2–2	0–1
Independiente del Valle (Ecuador)	2–2 (5–4 p)	(Colombia) Once Caldas	0–2	2–0
Lanús (Argentina)	2–1	(Brazil) Fluminense	1–0	1–1

=== Semi-finals ===
Team 1	Agg.	Team 2	1st leg	2nd leg
Universidad de Chile	2–3	(Argentina) Lanús	2–2	0–1
Independiente del Valle (Ecuador)	2–4	(Brazil) Atlético Mineiro	1–1	1–3

=== Final ===
22 November 2025
17:00 UTC−3

Lanús (Argentina)	0–0 (a.e.t.)	(Brazil) Atlético Mineiro
	Report
Penalties
Bou (penalty missed); Izquierdoz (penalty scored); Marcich (penalty scored); Aquino (penalty scored); Acosta (penalty missed); Cardozo (penalty scored); Watson (penalty scored)	5–4	(penalty missed) Hulk; (penalty scored) Scarpa; (penalty scored) Igor Gomes; (penalty missed) Biel Teixeira; (penalty scored) Everson; (penalty scored) Alexsander; (penalty missed) Vitor Hugo

Estadio Defensores del Chaco, Asunción
Attendance: 44,164
Referee: Piero Maza (Chile)

== Statistics ==
=== Top scorers ===
Rank	Player	Team	1S	GS1	GS2	GS3	GS4	GS5	GS6	KPO1	KPO2	⅛F1	⅛F2	QF1	QF2	SF1	SF2	F	Total
1	(Colombia) Dayro Moreno	(Colombia) Once Caldas			1	3				1		1	2	2					10
2	(Panama) Ismael Díaz	(Ecuador) Universidad Católica			2	2	2												6
2	(Venezuela) Junior Paredes	(Venezuela) Academia Puerto Cabello	1	1			2		2										6
4	(Chile) Lucas Assadi	Universidad de Chile								1	1	1	1		1				5
4	(Argentina) Pablo Vegetti	(Brazil) Vasco da Gama		2	1				1		1								5
4	(Argentina) Gaspar Gentile	(Peru) Cienciano (Peru) Alianza Lima				1	1	2		1									5
7	(Uruguay) Martín Cauteruccio	(Bolivia) Bolívar								1	1	1	1						4
7	(Argentina) Diego Diellos	(Bolivia) Nacional Potosí		1			1	2											4
7	(Chile) Pablo Aránguiz	(Chile) Unión Española	1			1			2										4
7	(Ecuador) Carlos Orejuela	(Ecuador) Mushuc Runa			1	1	1		1										4
7	(Argentina) Claudio Spinelli	(Ecuador) Independiente del Valle								1	1	1					1		4
7	(Paraguay) Junior Marabel	(Chile) Palestino		1	1		2												4
7	(Brazil) Hulk	(Brazil) Atlético Mineiro			1					1		1					1		4

Source: CONMEBOL

=== Team of the tournament ===
The CONMEBOL technical study group selected the following 11 players as the team of the tournament.

Position	Player	Team
Goalkeeper	(Argentina) Nahuel Losada	(Argentina) Lanús
Defenders	(Argentina) Sasha Marcich	(Argentina) Lanús
Defenders	(Argentina) Carlos Izquierdoz	(Argentina) Lanús
Defenders	(Paraguay) Junior Alonso	(Brazil) Atlético Mineiro
Midfielders	(Argentina) Ramiro Carrera	(Argentina) Lanús
Midfielders	(Argentina) Agustín Medina	(Argentina) Lanús
Midfielders	(Argentina) Marcelino Moreno	(Argentina) Lanús
Midfielders	(Brazil) Bernard	(Brazil) Atlético Mineiro
Forwards	(Argentina) Eduardo Salvio	(Argentina) Lanús
Forwards	(Argentina) Rodrigo Castillo	(Argentina) Lanús
Forwards	(Colombia) Dayro Moreno	(Colombia) Once Caldas

== See also ==
- 2025 Copa Libertadores
