= 2025 Copa Sudamericana final =

Final match of the 24th Copa Sudamericana edition

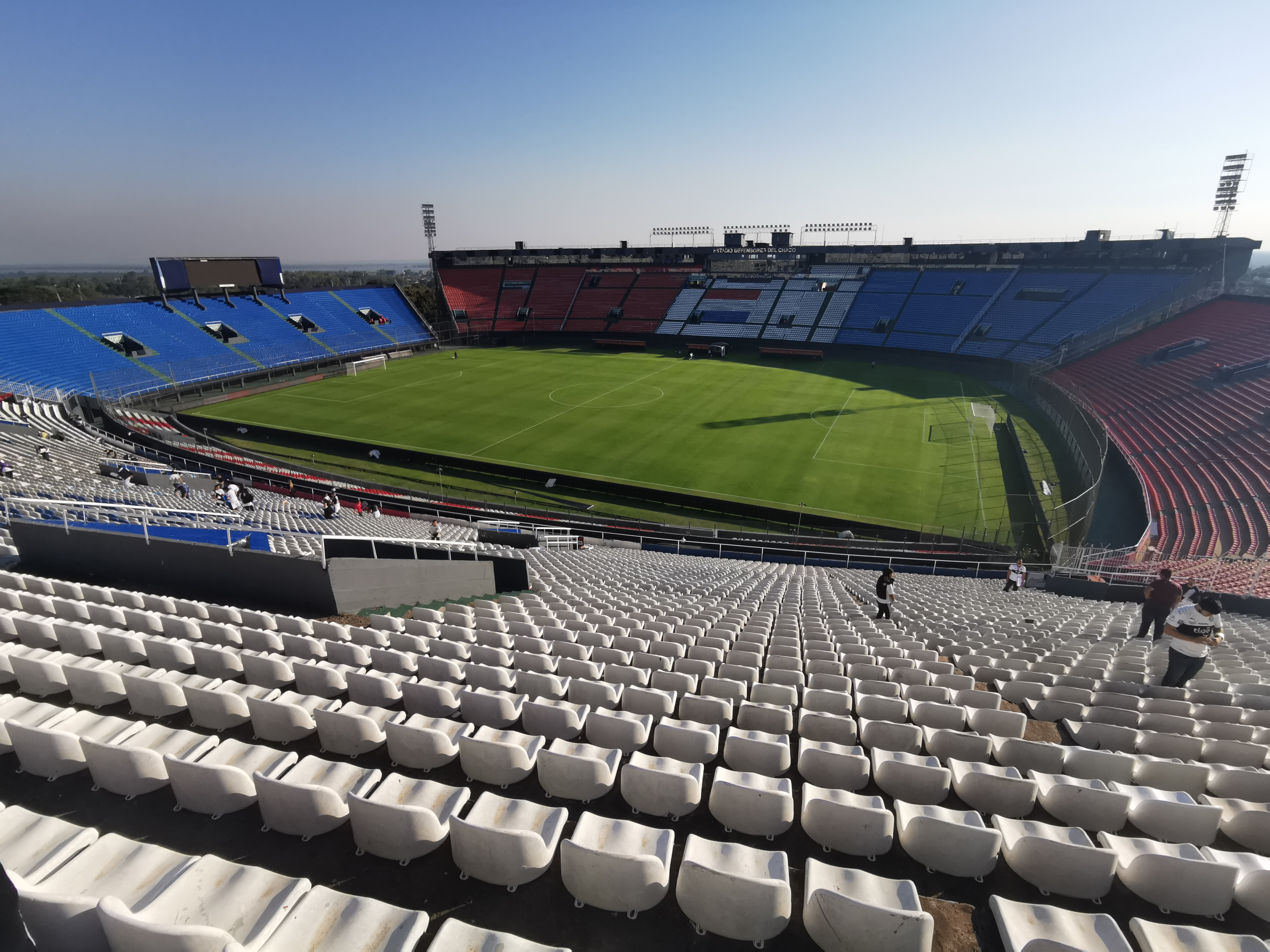
- The Estadio Defensores del Chaco in Asunción hosted the final.
- Event: 2025 Copa Sudamericana
Lanús	Atlético Mineiro
(Argentina)	(Brazil)
0	0
- After extra time Lanús won 5–4 on penalties
- Date: 22 November 2025
- Venue: Estadio Defensores del Chaco, Asunción
- Man of the Match: Nahuel Losada (Lanús)
- Referee: Piero Maza (Chile)
- Attendance: 44,164

The 2025 Copa Sudamericana final was the final match which decided the winner of the 2025 Copa Sudamericana. This was the 24th edition of the Copa Sudamericana, the second-tier South American continental club football tournament organized by CONMEBOL.

The match was played by Argentine club Lanús and Brazilian side Atlético Mineiro on 22 November 2025 at the Estadio Defensores del Chaco in Asunción, Paraguay.

Lanús defeated Atlético Mineiro 5–4 on kicks from the penalty mark following a 0–0 draw after extra time to win their second Copa Sudamericana title. As winners of the 2025 Copa Sudamericana, Lanús earned the right to play against the winners of the 2025 Copa Libertadores in the 2026 Recopa Sudamericana. They also automatically qualified for the 2026 Copa Libertadores group stage.

== Venue ==
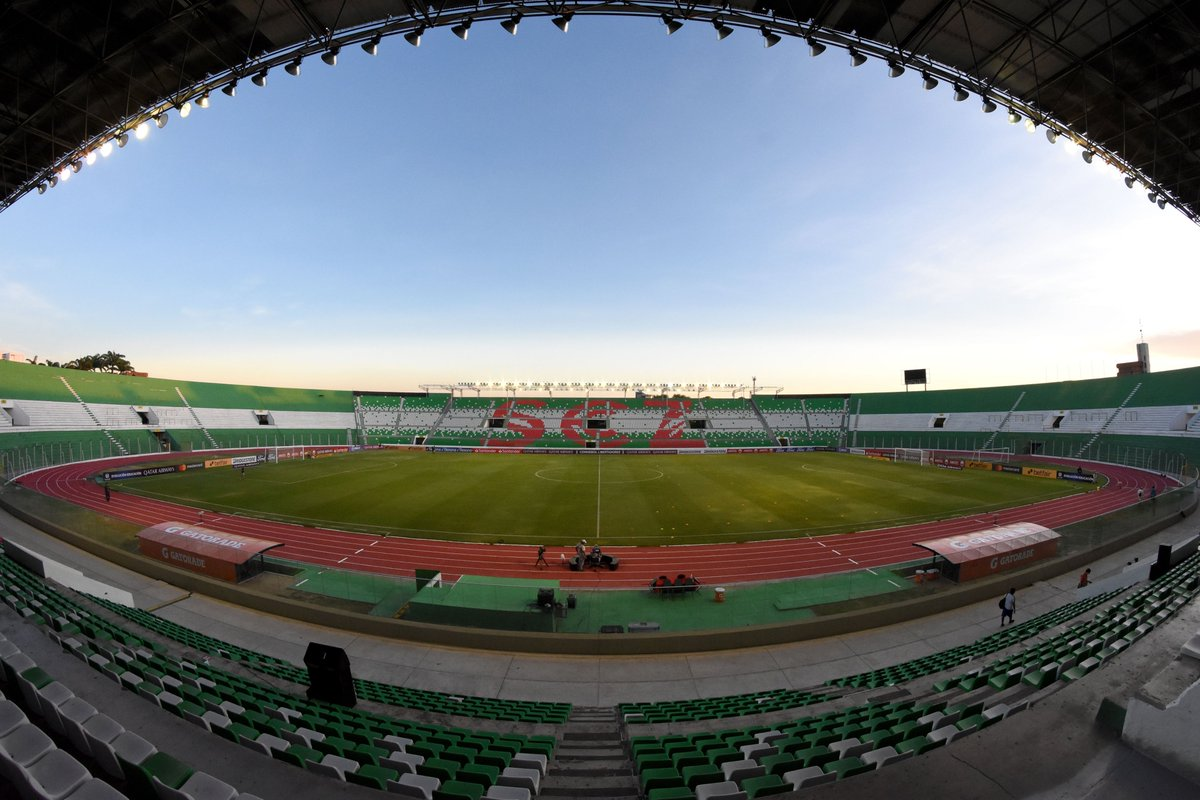
The Estadio Ramón Tahuichi Aguilera in Santa Cruz de la Sierra, Bolivia was originally chosen to host the final.

On 10 April 2024, CONMEBOL announced the cities selected to host the finals of the 2024 and 2025 Copa Sudamericana editions, with Santa Cruz de la Sierra, Bolivia being appointed for the 2025 final, which was set to be played at Estadio Ramón Tahuichi Aguilera. On 9 December 2024, a CONMEBOL commission visited Santa Cruz de la Sierra to inspect the infrastructure conditions of Estadio Ramón Tahuichi Aguilera as well as hotel infrastructure in the city, concluding that the stadium would need to undergo renovations which would be funded by the local government and CONMEBOL.

The refurbishment works, which were set to be concluded by 22 October 2025 and included the installation of a roof for the stands, the replacement of the field's turf, irrigation, drainage and lighting systems, and the removal of the existing athletic track, began on 2 May 2025. By the start of September, the Bolivian Football Federation (FBF) expressed its concern about the progress of the works given that it was reported that the "actual physical progress of works" was 26.3% when it should have been 50.27% by then, and that if the average progress at the time was maintained, only a 37.98% progress would be achieved by the last inspection by CONMEBOL, which was scheduled for the final days of September. In July, CONMEBOL had warned the FBF about the low progress of works at the stadium, which by then only reached 12%.

Although on 3 September 2025 the stadium was confirmed as the host for the final after a meeting between the FBF president Fernando Costa and his CONMEBOL counterpart Alejandro Domínguez, the low progress and delays of the refurbishment works ultimately led the confederation to strip Santa Cruz de la Sierra of the hosting rights for the Copa Sudamericana final on 11 September, appointing the previous year's host city Asunción as replacement. On 31 October 2025, Estadio Defensores del Chaco was confirmed as the venue for the match. This was the third Copa Sudamericana final played in the Paraguayan capital, but the first time the Defensores del Chaco hosted a final.

== Teams ==
Team	Previous finals appearances (bold indicates winners)
(Argentina) Lanús	2 (**2013**, 2020)
(Brazil) Atlético Mineiro	None

== Road to the final ==
Note: In all scores below, the score of the home team is given first.

(Argentina) Lanús			Round	(Brazil) Atlético Mineiro		
Opponent	Venue	Score		Opponent	Venue	Score
Bye			First stage	Bye		
**Group G**			Group stage	**Group H**		
(Venezuela) Academia Puerto Cabello	Away	2–2	Group stage	(Peru) Cienciano	Away	0–0
(Peru) Melgar	Home	3–0	Group stage	(Chile) Deportes Iquique	Home	4–0
(Brazil) Vasco da Gama	Away	0–0	Group stage	(Venezuela) Caracas	Away	1–1
(Peru) Melgar	Away	0–1	Group stage	(Chile) Deportes Iquique	Away	3–2
(Brazil) Vasco da Gama	Home	1–0	Group stage	(Venezuela) Caracas	Home	3–1
(Venezuela) Academia Puerto Cabello	Home	2–2	Group stage	(Peru) Cienciano	Home	1–1
Pos / Team / Pld / Pts; **1** / (Argentina) Lanús / **6** / **12**; 2 / (Brazil) Vasco da Gama / 6 / **8**; 3 / (Peru) Melgar / 6 / **7**; 4 / (Venezuela) Academia Puerto Cabello / 6 / **5**; Source: CONMEBOL			Group stage	Pos / Team / Pld / Pts; 1 / (Peru) Cienciano / 6 / **10**; **2** / (Brazil) Atlético Mineiro / **6** / **9**; 3 / (Venezuela) Caracas / 6 / **8**; 4 / (Chile) Deportes Iquique / 6 / **4**; Source: CONMEBOL		
**Seed 7**			Final stages	**Seed 11**		
Bye			Knockout round play-offs	(Colombia) Atlético Bucaramanga (tied 1–1 on aggregate, won on penalties)	Away	0–1
Bye			Knockout round play-offs	(Colombia) Atlético Bucaramanga (tied 1–1 on aggregate, won on penalties)	Home	0–1 (3–1 p)
(Argentina) Central Córdoba (tied 1–1 on aggregate, won on penalties)	Away	0–1	Round of 16	(Argentina) Godoy Cruz (won 3–1 on aggregate)	Home	2–1
(Argentina) Central Córdoba (tied 1–1 on aggregate, won on penalties)	Home	1–0 (4–2 p)	Round of 16	(Argentina) Godoy Cruz (won 3–1 on aggregate)	Away	0–1
(Brazil) Fluminense (won 2–1 on aggregate)	Home	1–0	Quarter-finals	(Bolivia) Bolívar (won 3–2 on aggregate)	Away	2–2
(Brazil) Fluminense (won 2–1 on aggregate)	Away	1–1	Quarter-finals	(Bolivia) Bolívar (won 3–2 on aggregate)	Home	1–0
Universidad de Chile (won 3–2 on aggregate)	Away	2–2	Semi-finals	(Ecuador) Independiente del Valle (won 4–2 on aggregate)	Away	1–1
Universidad de Chile (won 3–2 on aggregate)	Home	1–0	Semi-finals	(Ecuador) Independiente del Valle (won 4–2 on aggregate)	Home	3–1

== Format ==
The final was played as a single match at a pre-selected venue, with the higher-seeded team designated as the "home" team for administrative purposes. If scores were level after full time, 30 minutes of extra time would be played. If still tied after extra time, a penalty shoot-out would be used to determine the winners.

== Match ==
Tomás Cuello, Lyanco, Júnior Santos and Patrick (Atlético Mineiro) missed the final due to injuries.

=== Details ===
22 November 2025
17:00 UTC−3

Lanús (Argentina)	0–0 (a.e.t.)	(Brazil) Atlético Mineiro
	Report
Penalties
Bou (penalty missed); Izquierdoz (penalty scored); Marcich (penalty scored); Aquino (penalty scored); Acosta (penalty missed); Cardozo (penalty scored); Watson (penalty scored)	5–4	(penalty missed) Hulk; (penalty scored) Scarpa; (penalty scored) Igor Gomes; (penalty missed) Biel Teixeira; (penalty scored) Everson; (penalty scored) Alexsander; (penalty missed) Vitor Hugo

Estadio Defensores del Chaco, Asunción
Attendance: 44,164
Referee: Piero Maza (Chile)

**Lanús**	**Atlético Mineiro**

GK	26	(Argentina) Nahuel Losada
RB	4	(Uruguay) Gonzalo Pérez		(substituted off) 103'
CB	24	(Argentina) Carlos Izquierdoz (c)	(yellow card) 71'
CB	13	(Paraguay) José Canale
LB	6	(Argentina) Sasha Marcich
DM	39	(Argentina) Agustín Medina		(substituted off) 119'
DM	30	(Argentina) Agustín Cardozo
RW	11	(Argentina) Eduardo Salvio		(substituted off) 94'
AM	10	(Argentina) Marcelino Moreno		(substituted off) 103'
LW	23	(Argentina) Ramiro Carrera		(substituted off) 82'
CF	19	(Argentina) Rodrigo Castillo		(substituted off) 94'
Substitutes:
GK	17	(Argentina) Lautaro Morales
DF	2	(Argentina) Ezequiel Muñoz
DF	3	(Argentina) Nicolás Morgantini
DF	21	(Uruguay) Armando Méndez		(substituted on) 103'
DF	35	(Paraguay) Ronaldo Dejesús
MF	8	(Argentina) Franco Watson		(substituted on) 94'
MF	33	(Argentina) Juan Ramírez		(substituted on) 103'
MF	50	(Argentina) Facundo Sánchez
FW	7	(Argentina) Lautaro Acosta		(substituted on) 119'
FW	9	(Argentina) Walter Bou		(substituted on) 94'
FW	14	(Argentina) Alexis Canelo
FW	25	(Argentina) Dylan Aquino		(substituted on) 82'
Manager:
(Argentina) Mauricio Pellegrino

GK	22	(Brazil) Everson
CB	16	(Brazil) Ruan
CB	14	(Brazil) Vitor Hugo
CB	6	(Paraguay) Júnior Alonso (c)
LM	33	(Brazil) Rony		(substituted off) 106'
CM	21	(Ecuador) Alan Franco	(yellow card) 85'	(substituted off) 87'
CM	17	(Brazil) Igor Gomes
RM	13	(Brazil) Guilherme Arana		(substituted off) 87'
RF	11	(Brazil) Bernard		(substituted off) 78'
CF	7	(Brazil) Hulk	(yellow card) 80'
LF	92	(Brazil) Dudu		(substituted off) 94'
Substitutes:
GK	1	(Brazil) Gabriel Delfim
DF	2	(Brazil) Natanael
DF	23	(Chile) Iván Román
DF	26	(Argentina) Renzo Saravia		(substituted on) 106'
DF	38	(Brazil) Caio Paulista		(substituted on) 87'
MF	5	(Brazil) Alexsander		(substituted on) 87'
MF	8	(Argentina) Fausto Vera
MF	10	(Brazil) Gustavo Scarpa		(substituted on) 78'
MF	18	(Brazil) Reinier
MF	25	(Brazil) Gabriel Menino
FW	42	(Brazil) Cadu
FW	77	(Brazil) Biel Teixeira		(substituted on) 94'
Manager:
(Argentina) Jorge Sampaoli

Man of the Match:
Nahuel Losada (Lanús)

Assistant referees:
Miguel Rocha (Chile)
Alejandro Molina (Chile)
Fourth official:
Carlos Betancur (Colombia)
Fifth official:
Miguel Roldán (Colombia)
Video assistant referee:
Juan Lara (Chile)
Assistant video assistant referees:
Alan Sandoval (Chile)
David Rodríguez (Colombia)
Leonard Mosquera (Colombia)

**Match rules**
- 90 minutes.
- 30 minutes of extra time if necessary.
- Penalty shoot-out if scores still level.
- Twelve named substitutes.
- Maximum of five substitutions, with a sixth allowed in extra time.

== See also ==
- 2025 Copa Libertadores final
