= 2025 Copa Sudamericana final stages =

The 2025 Copa Sudamericana final stages were played from 15 July to 22 November 2025. A total of 24 teams competed in the final stages to decide the champions of the 2025 Copa Sudamericana, with the final played at Estadio Defensores del Chaco in Asunción, Paraguay.

== Qualified teams ==
The winners and runners-up of each of the eight groups in the Copa Sudamericana group stage as well as the third-placed teams of each of the eight groups in the Copa Libertadores group stage advanced to the final stages. The eight Copa Sudamericana group runners-up faced the eight Copa Libertadores group third-placed teams in the knockout round play-offs, whilst the eight Copa Sudamericana group winners directly advanced to the round of 16.

=== Copa Sudamericana group stage winners and runners-up ===
Group	Winners	Runners-up
A	(Argentina) Independiente	(Paraguay) Guaraní
B	(Ecuador) Universidad Católica	(Uruguay) Cerro Largo
C	(Argentina) Huracán	(Colombia) América de Cali
D	(Argentina) Godoy Cruz	(Brazil) Grêmio
E	(Ecuador) Mushuc Runa	(Chile) Palestino
F	(Brazil) Fluminense	(Colombia) Once Caldas
G	(Argentina) Lanús	(Brazil) Vasco da Gama
H	(Peru) Cienciano	(Brazil) Atlético Mineiro

=== Copa Libertadores group stage third-placed teams ===
Group	Third-placed teams
A	Universidad de Chile
B	(Ecuador) Independiente del Valle
C	(Argentina) Central Córdoba
D	(Peru) Alianza Lima
E	(Colombia) Atlético Bucaramanga
F	(Brazil) Bahia
G	(Bolivia) Bolívar
H	(Bolivia) San Antonio Bulo Bulo

=== Seeding ===
For the final stages, the teams were seeded according to their results in the group stage, with the Copa Sudamericana group winners seeded 1–8, the Copa Sudamericana group runners-up seeded 9–16, and the Copa Libertadores group third-placed teams seeded 17–24. For the round of 16 draw, the seeds 1–8 made up Pot 1, and the eight knockout round play-offs winners (seeds 9–24) made up Pot 2, keeping their seed. Teams from the same association could play each other from the knockout round play-offs onwards.

Seed	Grp	Team	Pld	W	D	L	GF	GA	GD	Pts	Qualification
1	SE1	(Ecuador) Mushuc Runa	6	5	1	0	12	4	+8	16	Round of 16
2	SC1	(Argentina) Huracán	6	4	2	0	11	2	+9	14	Round of 16
3	SB1	(Ecuador) Universidad Católica	6	4	2	0	12	5	+7	14	Round of 16
4	SF1	(Brazil) Fluminense	6	4	1	1	11	2	+9	13	Round of 16
5	SA1	(Argentina) Independiente	6	4	0	2	16	6	+10	12	Round of 16
6	SD1	(Argentina) Godoy Cruz	6	3	3	0	10	5	+5	12	Round of 16
7	SG1	(Argentina) Lanús	6	3	3	0	9	4	+5	12	Round of 16
8	SH1	(Peru) Cienciano	6	2	4	0	12	6	+6	10	Round of 16
9	SD2	(Brazil) Grêmio	6	3	3	0	8	4	+4	12	Play-off Match A
10	SF2	(Colombia) Once Caldas	6	4	0	2	8	6	+2	12	Play-off Match B
11	SH2	(Brazil) Atlético Mineiro	6	2	3	1	11	6	+5	9	Play-off Match C
12	SE2	(Chile) Palestino	6	3	0	3	9	9	0	9	Play-off Match D
13	SC2	(Colombia) América de Cali	6	1	5	0	6	4	+2	8	Play-off Match E
14	SG2	(Brazil) Vasco da Gama	6	2	2	2	8	8	0	8	Play-off Match F
15	SA2	(Paraguay) Guaraní	6	2	2	2	9	12	−3	8	Play-off Match G
16	SB2	(Uruguay) Cerro Largo	6	2	1	3	5	8	−3	7	Play-off Match H
17	LC	(Argentina) Central Córdoba	6	3	2	1	7	7	0	11	Play-off Match H
18	LA	Universidad de Chile	6	3	1	2	8	6	+2	10	Play-off Match G
19	LB	(Ecuador) Independiente del Valle	6	2	2	2	8	11	−3	8	Play-off Match F
20	LF	(Brazil) Bahia	6	2	1	3	5	7	−2	7	Play-off Match E
21	LG	(Bolivia) Bolívar	6	2	0	4	12	11	+1	6	Play-off Match D
22	LE	(Colombia) Atlético Bucaramanga	6	1	3	2	6	10	−4	6	Play-off Match C
23	LH	(Bolivia) San Antonio Bulo Bulo	6	2	0	4	5	15	−10	6	Play-off Match B
24	LD	(Peru) Alianza Lima	6	1	2	3	7	11	−4	5	Play-off Match A

Source: CONMEBOL Sudamericana, CONMEBOL Libertadores
Rules for classification: 1) Higher position in group; 2) Points; 3) Goal difference; 4) Goals scored; 5) Away goals scored; 6) CONMEBOL ranking (Regulations Article 2.4.3).

== Format ==
Starting from the knockout round play-offs, the teams played a single-elimination tournament with the following rules:

- In the knockout round play-offs, round of 16, quarter-finals and semi-finals, each tie was played on a home-and-away two-legged basis, with the higher-seeded team hosting the second leg (Regulations Article 2.2.3). If tied on aggregate, extra time was not played, and a penalty shoot-out was used to determine the winners (Regulations Article 2.4.4).
- The final was played as a single match at a venue pre-selected by CONMEBOL, with the higher-seeded team designated as the "home" team for administrative purposes (Regulations Article 2.2.6). If tied after regulation, 30 minutes of extra time were played. If still tied after extra time, a penalty shoot-out was used to determine the winners (Regulations Article 2.4.5).

== Draw ==
The draw for the round of 16 was held on 2 June 2025, 12:00 PYT (UTC−3) at the CONMEBOL headquarters in Luque, Paraguay. For the round of 16, the 16 teams were drawn into eight ties (A–H) between a Copa Sudamericana group winner (Pot 1) and a knockout round play-offs winner (Pot 2), with the group winners hosting the second leg. Teams from the same association or the same group could be drawn into the same tie (Regulations Article 2.2.3.2).

== Bracket ==
The bracket starting from the round of 16 was determined as follows:

Round	Matchups
Knockout round play-offs	(Group runners-up host second leg, matchups pre-determined): Play-offs Match A: Seed 9 vs. Seed 24; Play-offs Match B: Seed 10 vs. Seed 23; Play-offs Match C: Seed 11 vs. Seed 22; Play-offs Match D: Seed 12 vs. Seed 21; Play-offs Match E: Seed 13 vs. Seed 20; Play-offs Match F: Seed 14 vs. Seed 19; Play-offs Match G: Seed 15 vs. Seed 18; Play-offs Match H: Seed 16 vs. Seed 17
Round of 16	(Group winners host second leg, matchups decided by draw): Match A; Match B; Match C; Match D; Match E; Match F; Match G; Match H
Quarter-finals	(Higher-seeded team host second leg): Match S1: Winner A vs. Winner H; Match S2: Winner B vs. Winner G; Match S3: Winner C vs. Winner F; Match S4: Winner D vs. Winner E
Semi-finals	(Higher-seeded team host second leg): Match F1: Winner S1 vs. Winner S4; Match F2: Winner S2 vs. Winner S3
Final	(Higher-seeded team designated as "home" team): Winner F1 vs. Winner F2

The bracket was decided based on the round of 16 draw, which was held on 2 June 2025.

Knockout round play-offs
24	(Peru) Alianza Lima	2	1	3
9	(Brazil) Grêmio	0	1	1
18	Universidad de Chile	5	1	6
15	(Paraguay) Guaraní	0	2	2
17	(Argentina) Central Córdoba	0	3	3
16	(Uruguay) Cerro Largo	0	0	0
20	(Brazil) Bahia	0	0	0
13	(Colombia) América de Cali	0	2	2
19	(Ecuador) Independiente del Valle	4	1	5
14	(Brazil) Vasco da Gama	0	1	1
23	(Bolivia) San Antonio Bulo Bulo	0	0	0
10	(Colombia) Once Caldas	3	4	7
21	(Bolivia) Bolívar	3	3	6
12	(Chile) Palestino	0	0	0
22	(Colombia) Atlético Bucaramanga	0	1	1 (1)
11	(Brazil) Atlético Mineiro (p)	1	0	1 (3)

Round of 16
24	(Peru) Alianza Lima	2	2	4
3	(Ecuador) Universidad Católica	0	1	1
18	Universidad de Chile	1	1	2
5	(Argentina) Independiente (DQ)	0	1	1
17	(Argentina) Central Córdoba	1	0	1 (2)
7	(Argentina) Lanús (p)	0	1	1 (4)
13	(Colombia) América de Cali	1	0	1
4	(Brazil) Fluminense	2	2	4
19	(Ecuador) Independiente del Valle (p)	1	1	2 (4)
1	(Ecuador) Mushuc Runa	0	2	2 (2)
10	(Colombia) Once Caldas	1	3	4
2	(Argentina) Huracán	0	1	1
21	(Bolivia) Bolívar	2	2	4
8	(Peru) Cienciano	0	0	0
11	(Brazil) Atlético Mineiro	2	1	3
6	(Argentina) Godoy Cruz	1	0	1

Quarter-finals
24	(Peru) Alianza Lima	0	1	1
18	Universidad de Chile	0	2	2
7	(Argentina) Lanús	1	1	2
4	(Brazil) Fluminense	0	1	1
19	(Ecuador) Independiente del Valle (p)	0	2	2 (5)
10	(Colombia) Once Caldas	2	0	2 (4)
21	(Bolivia) Bolívar	2	0	2
11	(Brazil) Atlético Mineiro	2	1	3

Semi-finals
18	Universidad de Chile	2	0	2
7	(Argentina) Lanús	2	1	3
19	(Ecuador) Independiente del Valle	1	1	2
11	(Brazil) Atlético Mineiro	1	3	4

Final
22 November – Asunción
7	(Argentina) Lanús (p)	0 (5)
11	(Brazil) Atlético Mineiro	0 (4)

== Knockout round play-offs ==
=== Summary ===
The first legs were played on 15–17 July, and the second legs were played on 22–24 July 2025.

Team 1	Agg.	Team 2	1st leg	2nd leg
Alianza Lima (Peru)	3–1	(Brazil) Grêmio	2–0	1–1
San Antonio Bulo Bulo (Bolivia)	0–7	(Colombia) Once Caldas	0–3	0–4
Atlético Bucaramanga (Colombia)	1–1 (1–3 p)	(Brazil) Atlético Mineiro	0–1	1–0
Bolívar (Bolivia)	6–0	(Chile) Palestino	3–0	3–0
Bahia (Brazil)	0–2	(Colombia) América de Cali	0–0	0–2
Independiente del Valle (Ecuador)	5–1	(Brazil) Vasco da Gama	4–0	1–1
Universidad de Chile	6–2	(Paraguay) Guaraní	5–0	1–2
Central Córdoba (Argentina)	3–0	(Uruguay) Cerro Largo	0–0	3–0

=== Matches ===
16 July 2025
19:30 UTC−5

Alianza Lima (Peru)	2–0	(Brazil) Grêmio
Gentile 58'; E. Castillo 61'	Report

Estadio Alejandro Villanueva, Lima
Attendance: 23,320
Referee: Wilmar Roldán (Colombia)
23 July 2025
21:30 UTC−3

Grêmio (Brazil)	1–1	(Peru) Alianza Lima
Gustavo Martins 56'	Report	Barcos 90+6'

Arena do Grêmio, Porto Alegre
Attendance: 46,237
Referee: Darío Herrera (Argentina)

Alianza Lima won 3–1 on aggregate and advanced to the round of 16.

16 July 2025
20:30 UTC−4

San Antonio Bulo Bulo (Bolivia)	0–3	(Colombia) Once Caldas
	Report	Zapata 50'; Moreno 85'; Gómez 88'

Estadio Félix Capriles, Cochabamba (Note: San Antonio Bulo Bulo played their knockout round play-off home match at Estadio Félix Capriles, Cochabamba instead of their regular stadium Estadio Dr. Carlos Villegas, Entre Ríos which did not meet CONMEBOL requirements.)
Attendance: 1,389
Referee: Augusto Aragón (Ecuador)
23 July 2025
19:30 UTC−5

Once Caldas (Colombia)	4–0	(Bolivia) San Antonio Bulo Bulo
Barrios 7'; Zuleta 11'; Gómez 85'; Quiñones 90+1'	Report

Estadio Palogrande, Manizales
Attendance: 15,126
Referee: Felipe González (Chile)

Once Caldas won 7–0 on aggregate and advanced to the round of 16.

17 July 2025
19:30 UTC−5

Atlético Bucaramanga (Colombia)	0–1	(Brazil) Atlético Mineiro
	Report	Hulk 68' (pen.)

Estadio Américo Montanini, Bucaramanga
Attendance: 9,762
Referee: Alexis Herrera (Venezuela)
24 July 2025
21:30 UTC−3

Atlético Mineiro (Brazil)	0–1	(Colombia) Atlético Bucaramanga
	Report	Mena 45'
Penalties
Hulk (penalty scored); Scarpa (penalty missed); Bernard (penalty missed); Menino (penalty scored); Everson (penalty scored)	3–1	(penalty scored) Chávez; (penalty missed) Henao; (penalty missed) Mena; (penalty missed) Zárate

Arena MRV, Belo Horizonte
Attendance: 22,653
Referee: Esteban Ostojich (Uruguay)

Tied 1–1 on aggregate, Atlético Mineiro won on penalties and advanced to the round of 16.

16 July 2025
18:00 UTC−4

Bolívar (Bolivia)	3–0	(Chile) Palestino
Robson Matheus 58'; Cauteruccio 90+10' (pen.); Melgar 90+13'	Report

Estadio Hernando Siles, La Paz
Attendance: 22,190
Referee: Flavio de Souza (Brazil)
23 July 2025
18:00 UTC−4

Palestino (Chile)	0–3	(Bolivia) Bolívar
	Report	Cataño 24'; Sagredo 28'; Cauteruccio 66'

Estadio Nacional Julio Martínez Prádanos, Santiago (Note: Palestino played their knockout round play-off home match at Estadio Nacional Julio Martínez Prádanos, Santiago instead of their regular stadium Estadio Municipal de La Cisterna, Santiago which did not meet CONMEBOL requirements.)
Attendance: 4,746
Referee: Derlis López (Paraguay)

Bolívar won 6–0 on aggregate and advanced to the round of 16.

15 July 2025
21:30 UTC−3

Bahia (Brazil)	0–0	(Colombia) América de Cali
	Report

Arena Fonte Nova, Salvador
Attendance: 31,485
Referee: Andrés Matonte (Uruguay)
22 July 2025
19:30 UTC−5

América de Cali (Colombia)	2–0	(Brazil) Bahia
Murillo 28'; Garcés 90+6'	Report

Estadio Pascual Guerrero, Cali
Attendance: 20,418
Referee: Maximiliano Ramírez (Argentina)

América de Cali won 2–0 on aggregate and advanced to the round of 16.

15 July 2025
19:30 UTC−5

Independiente del Valle (Ecuador)	4–0	(Brazil) Vasco da Gama
Carabajal 45+3'; Mercado 49', 82'; Spinelli 51'	Report

Estadio Olímpico Atahualpa, Quito (Note: Independiente del Valle played their knockout round play-off home match at Estadio Olímpico Atahualpa, Quito instead of their regular stadium Estadio Banco Guayaquil, Quito which was reserved for the 2025 Copa América Femenina.)
Attendance: 2,586
Referee: Kevin Ortega (Peru)
22 July 2025
21:30 UTC−3

Vasco da Gama (Brazil)	1–1	(Ecuador) Independiente del Valle
Vegetti 66'	Report	Spinelli 37'

Estádio São Januário, Rio de Janeiro
Attendance: 9,476
Referee: Andrés Rojas (Colombia)

Independiente del Valle won 5–1 on aggregate and advanced to the round of 16.

17 July 2025
18:00 UTC−4

Universidad de Chile	5–0	(Paraguay) Guaraní
Aránguiz 22' (pen.); Altamirano 57'; Assadi 60'; Hormazábal 65'; Guerra 87'	Report

Estadio Nacional Julio Martínez Prádanos, Santiago
Attendance: 39,865
Referee: Leandro Rey Hilfer (Argentina)
24 July 2025
19:00 UTC−3

Guaraní (Paraguay)	2–1	Universidad de Chile
Torales 84', 89'	Report	Assadi 17'

Estadio General Pablo Rojas, Asunción (Note: Guaraní played their knockout round play-off home match at Estadio General Pablo Rojas, Asunción (originally scheduled at Estadio Defensores del Chaco, Asunción) instead of their regular stadium Estadio Rogelio Livieres, Asunción which was being rebuilt.)
Attendance: 1,160
Referee: Raphael Claus (Brazil)

Universidad de Chile won 6–2 on aggregate and advanced to the round of 16.

15 July 2025
19:00 UTC−3

Central Córdoba (Argentina)	0–0	(Uruguay) Cerro Largo
	Report

Estadio Único Madre de Ciudades, Santiago del Estero (Note: Central Córdoba played their home matches at Estadio Único Madre de Ciudades, Santiago del Estero instead of their regular stadium Estadio Alfredo Terrera, Santiago del Estero.)
Attendance: 11,222
Referee: Roberto Pérez (Peru)
22 July 2025
19:00 UTC−3

Cerro Largo (Uruguay)	0–3	(Argentina) Central Córdoba
	Report	Perelló 14'; Heredia 58'; Barrera 90'

Estadio Campeón del Siglo, Montevideo (Note: Cerro Largo played their knockout round play-off home match at Estadio Campeón del Siglo, Montevideo (originally scheduled at Estadio Centenario, Montevideo) instead of their regular stadium Estadio Arquitecto Antonio Eleuterio Ubilla, Melo which did not meet CONMEBOL requirements for this round.)
Attendance: 1,267
Referee: Anderson Daronco (Brazil)

Central Córdoba won 3–0 on aggregate and advanced to the round of 16.

== Round of 16 ==
=== Summary ===
The first legs were played on 12–14 August, and the second legs were played on 19–21 August 2025.

Team 1	Agg.	Team 2	1st leg	2nd leg
Alianza Lima (Peru)	4–1	(Ecuador) Universidad Católica	2–0	2–1
Bolívar (Bolivia)	4–0	(Peru) Cienciano	2–0	2–0
Once Caldas (Colombia)	4–1	(Argentina) Huracán	1–0	3–1
América de Cali (Colombia)	1–4	(Brazil) Fluminense	1–2	0–2
Central Córdoba (Argentina)	1–1 (2–4 p)	(Argentina) Lanús	1–0	0–1
Independiente del Valle (Ecuador)	2–2 (4–2 p)	(Ecuador) Mushuc Runa	1–0	1–2
Atlético Mineiro (Brazil)	3–1	(Argentina) Godoy Cruz	2–1	1–0
Universidad de Chile	2–1	(Argentina) Independiente	1–0	1–1 (Abd.) (Note: Match abandoned in the 47th minute of play with the score at 1–1 due to lack of security conditions. The matter was referred by CONMEBOL to its Disciplinary Commission, which subsequently disqualified Independiente from the competition.)

=== Matches ===
13 August 2025
19:30 UTC−5

Alianza Lima (Peru)	2–0	(Ecuador) Universidad Católica
Cantero 76', 87'	Report

Estadio Alejandro Villanueva, Lima
Attendance: 26,351
Referee: Leandro Rey Hilfer (Argentina)
20 August 2025
19:30 UTC−5

Universidad Católica (Ecuador)	1–2	(Peru) Alianza Lima
Londoño 18'	Report	E. Castillo 39'; Quevedo 81'

Estadio Olímpico Atahualpa, Quito
Attendance: 2,372
Referee: Flavio de Souza (Brazil)

Alianza Lima won 4–1 on aggregate and advanced to the quarter-finals (Match S1).

13 August 2025
18:00 UTC−4

Bolívar (Bolivia)	2–0	(Peru) Cienciano
Cauteruccio 20'; Batallini 58'	Report

Estadio Hernando Siles, La Paz
Attendance: 22,510
Referee: Jhon Ospina (Colombia)
20 August 2025
17:00 UTC−5

Cienciano (Peru)	0–2	(Bolivia) Bolívar
	Report	Cauteruccio 15' (pen.); Batallini 45+1'

Estadio Garcilaso, Cusco
Referee: Augusto Aragón (Ecuador)

Bolívar won 4–0 on aggregate and advanced to the quarter-finals (Match S2).

12 August 2025
17:00 UTC−5

Once Caldas (Colombia)	1–0	(Argentina) Huracán
Moreno 57' (pen.)	Report

Estadio Palogrande, Manizales
Attendance: 16,954
Referee: Ramon Abatti (Brazil)
19 August 2025
19:00 UTC−3

Huracán (Argentina)	1–3	(Colombia) Once Caldas
Miljevic 39' (pen.)	Report	Moreno 40', 88'; Barrios 65'

Estadio Tomás Adolfo Ducó, Buenos Aires
Attendance: 6,012
Referee: Paulo Zanovelli (Brazil)

Once Caldas won 4–1 on aggregate and advanced to the quarter-finals (Match S3).

12 August 2025
19:30 UTC−5

América de Cali (Colombia)	1–2	(Brazil) Fluminense
Barrios 90+3'	Report	Candelo 7' (o.g.); Canobbio 15'

Estadio Pascual Guerrero, Cali
Attendance: 32,182
Referee: Cristian Garay (Chile)
19 August 2025
21:30 UTC−3

Fluminense (Brazil)	2–0	(Colombia) América de Cali
Serna 23'; Martinelli 56'	Report

Estádio do Maracanã, Rio de Janeiro
Attendance: 36,368
Referee: Alexis Herrera (Venezuela)

Fluminense won 4–1 on aggregate and advanced to the quarter-finals (Match S4).

14 August 2025
21:30 UTC−3

Central Córdoba (Argentina)	1–0	(Argentina) Lanús
Verón 58'	Report

Estadio Único Madre de Ciudades, Santiago del Estero
Attendance: 11,763
Referee: Kevin Ortega (Peru)
21 August 2025
21:30 UTC−3

Lanús (Argentina)	1–0	(Argentina) Central Córdoba
Aquino 90+1'	Report
Penalties
Bou (penalty scored); Izquierdoz (penalty scored); Marcich (penalty scored); Moreno (penalty scored)	4–2	(penalty missed) Verón; (penalty missed) Cufré; (penalty scored) Galván; (penalty scored) Vera

Estadio Ciudad de Lanús, Lanús
Attendance: 14,999
Referee: Cristian Garay (Chile)

Tied 1–1 on aggregate, Lanús won on penalties and advanced to the quarter-finals (Match S4).

12 August 2025
19:30 UTC−5

Independiente del Valle (Ecuador)	1–0	(Ecuador) Mushuc Runa
Spinelli 19'	Report

Estadio Banco Guayaquil, Quito
Attendance: 2,526
Referee: Gery Vargas (Bolivia)
19 August 2025
19:30 UTC−5

Mushuc Runa (Ecuador)	2–1	(Ecuador) Independiente del Valle
Chalá 45+2'; Penilla 71'	Report	Hoyos 90+10'
Penalties
Penilla (penalty scored); Tapiero (penalty missed); L. Arce (penalty missed); Delgado (penalty scored)	2–4	(penalty scored) Sornoza; (penalty scored) Spinelli; (penalty scored) Mercado; (penalty scored) Schunke

Estadio Olímpico Atahualpa, Quito (Note: Mushuc Runa played their round of 16 home match at Estadio Olímpico Atahualpa, Quito instead of their regular stadium Estadio Olímpico Fernando Guerrero, Riobamba which was unfit for use.)
Attendance: 1,563
Referee: Edina Alves (Brazil)

Tied 2–2 on aggregate, Independiente del Valle won on penalties and advanced to the quarter-finals (Match S3).

14 August 2025
19:00 UTC−3

Atlético Mineiro (Brazil)	2–1	(Argentina) Godoy Cruz
Cuello 67'; Hulk 89'	Report	Andino 37'

Arena MRV, Belo Horizonte
Attendance: 23,247
Referee: Alexis Herrera (Venezuela)
21 August 2025
19:00 UTC−3

Godoy Cruz (Argentina)	0–1	(Brazil) Atlético Mineiro
	Report	Natanael 48'

Estadio Feliciano Gambarte, Godoy Cruz
Attendance: 5,569
Referee: Felipe González (Chile)

Atlético Mineiro won 3–1 on aggregate and advanced to the quarter-finals (Match S2).

13 August 2025
20:30 UTC−4

Universidad de Chile	1–0	(Argentina) Independiente
Assadi 36'	Report

Estadio Nacional Julio Martínez Prádanos, Santiago
Attendance: 44,105
Referee: Anderson Daronco (Brazil)
20 August 2025
21:30 UTC−3

Independiente (Argentina)	1–1 Abandoned (Note: The Independiente v Universidad de Chile second leg match was suspended in the 47th minute of play with the score at 1–1 (Universidad de Chile leading 2–1 on aggregate) due to lack of security conditions. Disturbances were triggered by Universidad de Chile fans throwing objects towards the home crowd and violence escalated when Independiente fans broke into the away section to attack visiting fans and force them to flee. The referee suspended the match when fans entered the field of play and later, given the continuing lack of conditions, abandoned it. In a statement, CONMEBOL confirmed the cancellation of the match and referred the matter to its Disciplinary Commission for resolution. On 4 September 2025, CONMEBOL's Disciplinary Commission disqualified Independiente from the competition.)	Universidad de Chile
Montiel 27'	Report	Assadi 11'

Estadio Libertadores de América, Avellaneda
Attendance: 23,615
Referee: Gustavo Tejera (Uruguay)

Independiente was disqualified from the competition and Universidad de Chile advanced to the quarter-finals (Match S1).

== Quarter-finals ==
=== Summary ===
The first legs were played on 16–18 September, and the second legs were played on 23–25 September 2025.

Team 1	Agg.	Team 2	1st leg	2nd leg
Alianza Lima (Peru)	1–2	Universidad de Chile	0–0	1–2
Bolívar (Bolivia)	2–3	(Brazil) Atlético Mineiro	2–2	0–1
Independiente del Valle (Ecuador)	2–2 (5–4 p)	(Colombia) Once Caldas	0–2	2–0
Lanús (Argentina)	2–1	(Brazil) Fluminense	1–0	1–1

=== Matches ===
18 September 2025
19:30 UTC−5

Alianza Lima (Peru)	0–0	Universidad de Chile
	Report

Estadio Alejandro Villanueva, Lima
Referee: Ramon Abatti (Brazil)
25 September 2025
21:30 UTC−3

Universidad de Chile	2–1	(Peru) Alianza Lima
Assadi 5'; Altamirano 51'	Report	E. Castillo 64'

Estadio Municipal Francisco Sánchez Rumoroso, Coquimbo (Note: Universidad de Chile played their quarter-final home match at Estadio Municipal Francisco Sánchez Rumoroso, Coquimbo instead of their regular stadium Estadio Nacional Julio Martínez Prádanos, Santiago which was reserved for the 2025 FIFA U-20 World Cup.)
Attendance: 0 (Note: Universidad de Chile played their quarter-final and semi-final home matches behind closed doors as punishment for the events of their round of 16 second leg match against Independiente.)
Referee: Carlos Betancur (Colombia)

Universidad de Chile won 2–1 on aggregate and advanced to the semi-finals (Match F1).

17 September 2025
18:00 UTC−4

Bolívar (Bolivia)	2–2	(Brazil) Atlético Mineiro
Robson Matheus 48'; Romero 88' (pen.)	Report	Alexsander 45'; Vitor Hugo 45+6'

Estadio Hernando Siles, La Paz
Referee: Kevin Ortega (Peru)
24 September 2025
19:00 UTC−3

Atlético Mineiro (Brazil)	1–0	(Bolivia) Bolívar
Bernard 90+1'	Report

Arena MRV, Belo Horizonte
Attendance: 34,102
Referee: Facundo Tello (Argentina)

Atlético Mineiro won 3–2 on aggregate and advanced to the semi-finals (Match F2).

17 September 2025
19:30 UTC−5

Independiente del Valle (Ecuador)	0–2	(Colombia) Once Caldas
	Report	Moreno 22', 49'

Estadio Banco Guayaquil, Quito
Referee: Piero Maza (Chile)
24 September 2025
19:30 UTC−5

Once Caldas (Colombia)	0–2	(Ecuador) Independiente del Valle
	Report	Hoyos 27', 51'
Penalties
Moreno (penalty scored); Mejía (penalty missed); Gómez (penalty scored); Barrios (penalty scored); M. García (penalty scored); Aguirre (penalty missed)	4–5	(penalty scored) Cazares; (penalty scored) Méndez; (penalty missed) Ibarra; (penalty scored) Schunke; (penalty scored) Spinelli; (penalty scored) Loor

Estadio Palogrande, Manizales
Referee: Maximiliano Ramírez (Argentina)

Tied 2–2 on aggregate, Independiente del Valle won on penalties and advanced to the semi-finals (Match F2).

16 September 2025
21:30 UTC−3

Lanús (Argentina)	1–0	(Brazil) Fluminense
Moreno 89'	Report

Estadio Ciudad de Lanús, Lanús
Referee: Gustavo Tejera (Uruguay)
23 September 2025
21:30 UTC−3

Fluminense (Brazil)	1–1	(Argentina) Lanús
Canobbio 20'	Report	Aquino 67'

Estádio do Maracanã, Rio de Janeiro
Attendance: 43,742
Referee: Jesús Valenzuela (Venezuela)

Lanús won 2–1 on aggregate and advanced to the semi-finals (Match F1).

== Semi-finals ==
=== Summary ===
The first legs were played on 21 and 23 October, and the second legs were played on 28 and 30 October 2025.

Team 1	Agg.	Team 2	1st leg	2nd leg
Universidad de Chile	2–3	(Argentina) Lanús	2–2	0–1
Independiente del Valle (Ecuador)	2–4	(Brazil) Atlético Mineiro	1–1	1–3

=== Matches ===
23 October 2025
19:00 UTC−3

Universidad de Chile	2–2	(Argentina) Lanús
Di Yorio 63'; Aránguiz 90+9' (pen.)	Report	Castillo 25', 29'

Estadio Nacional Julio Martínez Prádanos, Santiago
Attendance: 0
Referee: Anderson Daronco (Brazil)
30 October 2025
19:00 UTC−3

Lanús (Argentina)	1–0	Universidad de Chile
Castillo 62'	Report

Estadio Ciudad de Lanús, Lanús
Referee: Alexis Herrera (Venezuela)

Lanús won 3–2 on aggregate and advanced to the final.

21 October 2025
19:30 UTC−5

Independiente del Valle (Ecuador)	1–1	(Brazil) Atlético Mineiro
Sornoza 11' (pen.)	Report	Dudu 90+1'

Estadio Banco Guayaquil, Quito
Attendance: 5,151
Referee: Carlos Betancur (Colombia)
28 October 2025
21:30 UTC−3

Atlético Mineiro (Brazil)	3–1	(Ecuador) Independiente del Valle
Arana 36'; Bernard 43'; Hulk 73'	Report	Spinelli 63'

Arena MRV, Belo Horizonte
Attendance: 40,185
Referee: Esteban Ostojich (Uruguay)

Atlético Mineiro won 4–2 on aggregate and advanced to the final.

== Final ==
The final was played on 22 November 2025 in Asunción, Paraguay. Estadio Ramón Tahuichi Aguilera in Santa Cruz de la Sierra, Bolivia had been originally selected as the venue for the final, but CONMEBOL announced the change of venue on 11 September 2025 due to delays in the works to prepare the stadium for the event.

22 November 2025
17:00 UTC−3

Lanús (Argentina)	0–0 (a.e.t.)	(Brazil) Atlético Mineiro
	Report
Penalties
Bou (penalty missed); Izquierdoz (penalty scored); Marcich (penalty scored); Aquino (penalty scored); Acosta (penalty missed); Cardozo (penalty scored); Watson (penalty scored)	5–4	(penalty missed) Hulk; (penalty scored) Scarpa; (penalty scored) Igor Gomes; (penalty missed) Biel Teixeira; (penalty scored) Everson; (penalty scored) Alexsander; (penalty missed) Vitor Hugo

Estadio Defensores del Chaco, Asunción
Attendance: 44,164
Referee: Piero Maza (Chile)
