= Carlos Orejuela =

Carlos Orejuela may refer to:

- Carlos Orejuela (footballer, born 1980), Peruvian football striker
- Carlos Orejuela (footballer, born 1993), Ecuadorian football striker
