= Nahuel Losada =

Argentine footballer

Personal information
- Full name: Nahuel Hernán Losada
- Date of birth: 17 April 1993 (age 33)
- Place of birth: Berisso, Argentina
- Height: 1.88 m (6 ft 2 in)
- Position: Goalkeeper

Team information
- Current team: Lanús
- Number: 26

Youth career
- Estudiantes

Senior career*
Years	Team	Apps	(Gls)
2014–2017	Estudiantes	0	(0)
2015	→ Unión Mar del Plata (loan)	32	(0)
2016	→ Atlético Atlanta (loan)	19	(0)
2017	→ All Boys (loan)	24	(0)
2017–2020	All Boys	23	(0)
2018	→ Deportivo Pasto (loan)	18	(0)
2020–2024	Belgrano	123	(0)
2024–	Lanús	65	(0)
- * Club domestic league appearances and goals as of 17:21, 6 June 2026 (UTC)

Nahuel Hernán Losada (born 17 April 1993) is an Argentine professional footballer who plays as a goalkeeper for Lanús.

== Career ==
He was born on 17 April 1993 in Berisso, in the Province of Buenos Aires. He made the lower divisions in the Estudiantes de La Plata. With no place in the Estudiantes team, he was loaned to Unión de Mar del Plata for the whole of the 2015 season.

He was the hero as CA Lanús beat Atlético Mineiro in the 2025 Copa Sudamericana final saving three penalties in the penalty shootout.

== Honours ==
Belgrano

- Primera Nacional: 2022

Lanús

- Copa Sudamericana: 2025
- Recopa Sudamericana: 2026
