= Lautaro Morales =

Argentine footballer

Personal information
- Full name: Lautaro Alberto Morales
- Date of birth: 16 December 1999 (age 26)
- Place of birth: Quilmes, Argentina
- Height: 1.87 m (6 ft 2 in)
- Position: Goalkeeper

Team information
- Current team: Tigre (on loan from Lanús)
- Number: 26

Youth career
- 2011–2019: Lanús

Senior career*
Years	Team	Apps	(Gls)
2019–	Lanús	46	(0)
2022–2023	→ Newell's Old Boys (loan)	16	(0)
2023–2024	→ Talleres (loan)	2	(0)
2026	→ Universidad Central (loan)	6	(0)
2026–	→ Tigre (loan)	1	(0)
- * Club domestic league appearances and goals as of 17:55, 9 November 2026 (UTC)

Lautaro Alberto Morales (born 16 December 1999) is an Argentine professional footballer who plays as a goalkeeper for Tigre, on loan from Lanús.

== Club career ==
Morales progressed through the Lanús youth ranks, signing in 2011. He became a first-team member at the start of the 2019–20 campaign, though wouldn't make a competitive appearance in that season; going unused on the bench twenty-eight times in total. His senior debut did arrive at the beginning of the next season, though, with the goalkeeper playing the full duration of a victory over Brazilian side São Paulo in the Copa Sudamericana second stage, first leg on 28 October 2020.

On 5 August 2022, Morales joined Newell's Old Boys on a loan deal until June 2023.

On 10 August 2023, Lanús sent Morales on loan to Argentine Primera División side Talleres until 31 December 2024, with a future option to make the move permanent.

== International career ==
In 2017, with no prior youth call-ups, Morales was selected to train with the Argentine senior squad ahead of friendlies with Brazil and Singapore in Asia and Oceania. Two years later, Morales was called up by Argentina for the 2019 South American U-20 Championship in Chile. He didn't make an appearance but was on the bench for all nine matches as they qualified for the 2019 FIFA U-20 World Cup, though he didn't make the squad for that tournament in Poland.

== Personal life ==
In September 2020, it was confirmed that Morales had tested positive for COVID-19 amid the pandemic; he isolated after showing symptoms.

== Career statistics ==
As of 5 February 2023.

Appearances and goals by club, season and competition
Club	Division	League			Cup		Continental		Total	
Club	Division	Season	Apps	Goals	Apps	Goals	Apps	Goals	Apps	Goals
Lanús	Primera División	2020	-		7	0	6 (Note: Appearance(s) in the Copa Sudamericana)	0	13	0
Lanús	Primera División	2021	12	0	15	0	8	0	35	0
Lanús	Primera División	2022	1	0	3	0	1	0	5	0
Lanús	Primera División	2023	2	0	-		-		2	0
Lanús	Total		15	0	25	0	15	0	55	0
Newell's Old Boys	Primera División	2022	16	0	1	0	-		17	0
Career total			31	0	26	0	15	0	72	0

== Honours ==
Lanús

- Copa Sudamericana: 2025
