= Agustín Medina (footballer, born 2006) =

Argentine footballer

Personal information
- Full name: Diego Agustín Medina
- Date of birth: October 24, 2006 (age 20)
- Place of birth: San Nicolás, Argentina
- Height: 1.75 m (5 ft 9 in)
- Position: Defensive midfielder

Team information
- Current team: Lanús
- Number: 17

Youth career
- Lanús

Senior career*
Years	Team	Apps	(Gls)
2025–	Lanús	41	(0)

International career^{‡}
2022	Argentina U17	2	(0)
- * Club domestic league appearances and goals as of 19:53, 5 August 2026 (UTC) ‡ National team caps and goals as of 19:53, 5 August 2026 (UTC)

Diego Agustín Medina (born 24 October 2006) is an Argentine footballer who plays as a defensive midfielder for AFA Liga Profesional de Fútbol club Lanús.

== Club career ==
Medina is a product of the youth academy of Lanús. He made his senior debut with Lanús in a 2–0 win Argentine Primera División over Sarmiento. On 18 February 2025, he extended his contract with Lanús until December 2027. On 16 April 2025, he extended his contract until December 2028. In 2025, he established himself as a starter and played in the 2025 Copa Sudamericana final and helped the club win their second Copa Sudamerica final. In January 2026, he was named the best U20 Argentine player by the football analytics organization, the International Centre for Sports Studies. On 14 April 2026, he again extended his contract until 2031.

== International career ==
Medina debuted with the Argentina U17s for friendly matches in 2022.

== Honours ==
Lanús

- Copa Sudamericana: 2025
- Recopa Sudamericana: 2026
