= Gustavo Vargas =

Gustavo Vargas may refer to:

- Gustavo Vargas (footballer) (born 1955), Mexican football manager and former player
- Gustavo Vargas Molinare (1903-1985), Chilean businessman and politician
