= Junior Paredes =

Venezuelan footballer (born 2001)

Personal information
- Full name: Junior José Paredes Jaspe
- Date of birth: 1 January 2001 (age 25)
- Place of birth: Maracaibo, Venezuela
- Height: 1.85 m (6 ft 1 in)
- Position: Forward

Team information
- Current team: Trujillanos

Youth career
- Zulia

Senior career*
Years	Team	Apps	(Gls)
2016–2022	Zulia	86	(22)
2020–2021	→ Torque (loan)	2	(0)
2022–2023	Atlético Morelia	3	(0)
2023	Estudiantes	15	(5)
2025	Academia Puerto Cabello	15	(5)
2026	Deportivo La Guaira	10	(1)
2026-	Trujillanos	2	(0)

International career^{‡}
2018–2019	Venezuela U20	3	(0)
- * Club domestic league appearances and goals as of 10 March 2026 ‡ National team caps and goals as of 07:54, 23 February 2019 (UTC)

Junior José Paredes Jaspe (born 1 January 2001) is a Venezuelan footballer who plays as a forward for Trujillanos.

== Career statistics ==
=== Club ===
As of 30 January 2019.

Club	Season	League			Cup		Continental		Other		Total	
Club	Season	Division	Apps	Goals	Apps	Goals	Apps	Goals	Apps	Goals	Apps	Goals
Zulia	2017	Venezuelan Primera División	2	0	2 (Note: Appearances in the Copa Venezuela)	0	–		0	0	4	0
Zulia	2018	Venezuelan Primera División	14	7	3	0	–		0	0	17	7
Zulia	2019	Venezuelan Primera División	0	0	0	0	–		0	0	0	0
Career total			16	7	5	0	0	0	0	0	21	7
