= Claudio Spinelli =

Argentine footballer

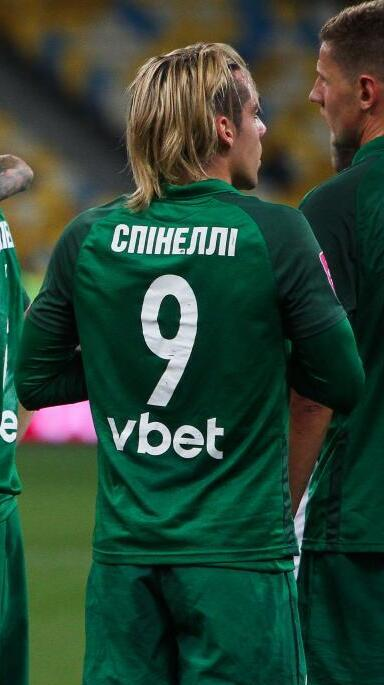

Personal information
- Full name: Claudio Paul Spinelli
- Date of birth: 21 January 1997 (age 29)
- Place of birth: El Talar, Buenos Aires, Argentina
- Height: 1.80 m (5 ft 11 in)
- Position: Forward

Team information
- Current team: Vasco da Gama
- Number: 77

Senior career*
Years	Team	Apps	(Gls)
2017–2018	Tigre	2	(0)
2017–2018	→ San Martín (loan)	13	(7)
2018–2021	Genoa	0	(0)
2018–2019	→ Crotone (loan)	6	(1)
2019	→ Argentinos Juniors (loan)	7	(0)
2019–2020	→ Gimnasia y Esgrima (loan)	9	(0)
2020–2021	→ Koper (loan)	27	(3)
2021	→ Oleksandriya (loan)	17	(2)
2022–2023	Lanús	12	(0)
2023	Deportivo Maldonado	22	(5)
2024	Bnei Sakhnin	10	(2)
2024	Defensor Sporting	15	(7)
2025	Independiente del Valle	50	(28)
2026–	Vasco da Gama	8	(2)
- * Club domestic league appearances and goals as of 8 April 2026

Claudio Paul Spinelli (born 21 June 1997) is an Argentine footballer who plays as a forward for Campeonato Brasileiro Série A club Vasco da Gama.

== Club career ==
In July 2018, he signed with Serie A Italian club Genoa, and on 14 August 2018, he was sent on a season-long loan to Serie B club Crotone.

He made his Serie B debut for Crotone on 26 August 2018 in a game against Cittadella as an 82nd-minute substitute for Davide Faraoni. He made his first start for Crotone on 20 October 2018 against Padova and scored his first goal in Italy in the 12th minute as Crotone won 2–1.

On 30 January 2019, Spinelli joined Argentine club Argentinos Juniors on loan until 30 June 2019. Spinelli scored his first goal for Argentinos Juniors on 5 March 2019 in a 4–1 victory over Douglas Haig in the Copa Argentina. Spinelli scored his second goal for Argentinos Juniors on 14 April 2019 in a 3–2 victory over Independiente in the Copa de la Superliga.

On 1 October 2020, Spinelli joined Slovenian side Koper on a season-long loan.

On 19 July 2021, he joined Oleksandriya in Ukraine.

On 17 March 2022, Spinelli signed with Lanús.

== Honours ==
Defensor Sporting

- Copa Uruguay: 2024
