= Diego Diellos =

Argentine footballer

Personal information
- Full name: Diego Gaspar Diellos
- Date of birth: 24 September 1993 (age 33)
- Place of birth: San Vicente, Buenos Aires, Argentina
- Height: 1.87 m (6 ft 2 in)
- Position: Forward

Team information
- Current team: San Martín Tucumán

Senior career*
Years	Team	Apps	(Gls)
2012–2014	Quilmes	8	(0)
2013–2014	→ Sarmiento (loan)	20	(2)
2014	Gimnasia de Jujuy	0	(0)
2015	Sportivo Belgrano	23	(2)
2016–2017	Central Córdoba SdE	25	(5)
2017–2018	→ Almagro (loan)	19	(6)
2018	Cafetaleros de Tapachula	10	(2)
2019	Rangers	10	(0)
2020–2024	Agropecuario	64	(8)
2021	→ Güemes (loan)	25	(2)
2024	Deportivo Madryn	16	(3)
2024–2025	San Telmo	19	(7)
2025	Nacional Potosí	6	(1)
2025–2026	Ferro Carril Oeste	8	(0)
2026–	San Martín Tucumán	10	(3)

International career
2011	Argentina U20		
- * Club domestic league appearances and goals as of 17:37, 4 May 2026 (UTC)

Diego Gaspar Diellos (born 24 September 1993) is an Argentine footballer who plays as a forward for San Martín Tucumán.

== Career ==
Abroad, Diellos played for Mexican club Cafetaleros de Tapachula in 2018 and Chilean club Rangers de Talca in 2019.

In 2024, Diellos played for Deportivo Madryn and San Telmo.
