= Dylan Aquino =

Argentine footballer

Personal information
- Full name: Dylan Fabricio Aquino
- Date of birth: 4 June 2005 (age 21)
- Place of birth: Quilmes, Argentina
- Height: 1.71 m (5 ft 7 in)
- Position: Winger

Team information
- Current team: Union Saint-Gilloise
- Number: 20

Senior career*
Years	Team	Apps	(Gls)
2023–2026	Lanús	70	(7)
2026–	Union Saint-Gilloise	2	(0)

International career^{‡}
2024	Argentina U20	3	(1)
- * Club domestic league appearances and goals as of 25 October 2026 ‡ National team caps and goals as of 12:30, 6 August 2026 (UTC)

Dylan Fabricio Aquino (born 4 June 2005) is an Argentine professional footballer who plays as a winger for Belgian Pro League club Union Saint-Gilloise.

== Club career ==
A youth product of Lanús, Aquino was promoted to their senior team in 2023. On 14 October 2024, Aquino extended his contract with Lanús until December 2026. He played key knockout goals for Lanús in a campaign that saw them win the 2025 Copa Sudamericana. On 15 May 2025, he extended his contract until 2027. On 15 May 2026, he again extended his contract with the club until December 2028.

Union Saint-GIlloise announced his transfert to the club on 2 September 2026. His contract last until June 2030, with the option of staying one more year at the Brussels' club.

== International career ==
Aquino was called up to the Argentina U20s in March 2024.

== Career statistics ==
=== Club ===
As of match played 25 October 2026

Appearances and goals by club, season and competition
Club	Season	League			National cup		Continental		Other		Total	
Club	Season	Division	Apps	Goals	Apps	Goals	Apps	Goals	Apps	Goals	Apps	Goals
Lanús	2023	AFA Liga Profesional de Fútbol	6	0	—		—		—		6	0
Lanús	2024	AFA Liga Profesional de Fútbol	18	1	0	0	5 (Note: Appearances in Copa Sudamericana)	0	—		23	1
Lanús	2025	AFA Liga Profesional de Fútbol	30	0	4	2	9	3	—		43	5
Lanús	2026	AFA Liga Profesional de Fútbol	13	5	0	0	—		2 (Note: Appearances in Recopa Sudamericana)	1	15	6
Lanús	Total		67	6	4	2	14	3	2	1	87	12
Union Saint-Gilloise	2026–27	Belgian Pro League	2	0	1	0	3 (Note: Appearances in UEFA Europa League)	1	—		6	1
Career total			69	6	5	2	17	4	2	1	93	13

== Honours ==
Lanús

- Copa Sudamericana: 2025
- Recopa Sudamericana: 2026
