= Franco Watson =

Argentine footballer

Personal information
- Full name: Franco Nahuel Watson
- Date of birth: 25 July 2002 (age 24)
- Place of birth: Córdoba, Argentina
- Height: 1.65 m (5 ft 5 in)
- Position: Attacking midfielder

Team information
- Current team: Lanús
- Number: 8

Youth career
- 2009–2021: Instituto

Senior career*
Years	Team	Apps	(Gls)
2021–2023	Instituto	66	(6)
2023–	Lanús	25	(1)
2024–2025	→ Huracán (loan)	13	(0)
- * Club domestic league appearances and goals as of 17:10, 6 June 2026 (UTC) ‡ National team caps and goals as of 17:06, 20 March 2023 (UTC)

Franco Nahuel Watson (born 25 July 2002) is an Argentine professional footballer who plays as an attacking midfielder for the Argentine Primera División club Lanús.

== Club career ==
Watson is a youth product of Instituto, having joined at the age of 7 and working up their youth categories. He started training with their senior team in 2019. He made his senior and professional debut with Instituto in a 2–1 Primera Nacional win over Quilmes on 4 January 2021. On 22 April 2022, he signed a professional contract with the club. He helped the club earn promotion to the 2023 Argentine Primera División.

== Personal life ==
Watson is of Italian descent through a grandfather from Palermo, and holds an Italian passport. His father Sergio and older brother Nicolás are also footballers. He is one of 9 siblings.

== Honours ==
Lanús

- Copa Sudamericana: 2025
- Recopa Sudamericana: 2026
