= Gaspar Gentile =

Argentine footballer

Personal information
- Full name: Gaspar Gentile
- Date of birth: 16 February 1995 (age 31)
- Place of birth: Los Quirquinchos, Argentina
- Height: 1.82 m (5 ft 11 1/2 in)
- Position: Winger

Team information
- Current team: Alianza Lima
- Number: 25

Youth career
- Newell's Old Boys

Senior career*
Years	Team	Apps	(Gls)
2016–2017	Ferro Carril Oeste	35	(1)
2017–2018	Temperley	9	(0)
2018–2019	→ Alvarado (loan)	31	(6)
2019–2020	Alvarado	7	(0)
2020	Universidad San Martín	21	(3)
2021–2023	UTC	85	(20)
2024	Deportivo Garcilaso	34	(5)
2025	Cienciano	8	(2)
2025–	Alianza Lima	16	(2)
- * Club domestic league appearances and goals as of 29 December 2025

Gaspar Gentile (born 16 February 1995) is an Argentine professional footballer who plays as a winger for Alianza Lima.

== Career ==
Gentile began in the youth ranks of Newell's Old Boys. In 2016, Ferro Carril Oeste of Torneo Federal A signed Gentile. He made his debut against Tiro Federal on 7 February during a 3–0 victory. In the following October, Gentile scored for the first time in an away win over Defensores de Belgrano. July 2017 saw Gentile join Argentine Primera División side Temperley. His first professional football appearance arrived on 10 September in a 4–1 loss to Racing Club. Gentile was loaned out to Alvarado in July 2018. He returned to Temperley in June 2019, though would soon be signed permanently by Alvarado.

In February 2020, Gentile terminated his contract with Alvarado before, on 26 February, agreeing a move to Peru with Universidad San Martín. He made his first appearance in a goalless draw with Atlético Grau on 8 March. He remained for one season, scoring goals against Cusco, Sport Huancayo and Academia Cantolao as they placed eleventh in 2020. At the end of the year, on 9 December, Gentile penned terms to head across the division to UT Cajamarca for 2021.After playing for Deportivo Garcilaso and Cienciano, in 2025 he moved to Lima to play for Alianza Lima.

== Career statistics ==
As of 23 November 2025.

Club statistics
Club	Division	League			Cup		Continental		Total	
Club	Division	Season	Apps	Goals	Apps	Goals	Apps	Goals	Apps	Goals
Ferro Carril Oeste	Primera B Nacional	2016-17	39	1	—		—		39	1
Temperley	Argentine Primera División	2017-18	9	0	—		—		9	0
Alvarado	Primera B Nacional	2018-19	31	6	—		—		31	6
Alvarado	Primera B Nacional	2019-20	7	0	3	1	—		10	1
Alvarado	Total		38	6	3	1	0	0	41	7
Universidad San Martín	Peruvian Primera División	2020	21	3	—		—		21	3
UTC	Peruvian Primera División	2021	25	3	3	1	2	0	30	4
UTC	Peruvian Primera División	2022	34	13	—		—		34	13
UTC	Peruvian Primera División	2023	35	6	—		—		35	6
UTC	Total		94	22	3	1	2	0	99	23
Deportivo Garcilaso	Peruvian Primera División	2024	34	5	—		7	1	41	6
Cienciano	Peruvian Primera División	2025	10	2	—		7	4	17	6
Club Alianza Lima	Peruvian Primera División	2025	16	2	—		3	1	19	3
Career total			261	41	6	2	19	6	286	49
