= Carlos Orejuela (footballer, born 1993) =

Ecuadorian footballer

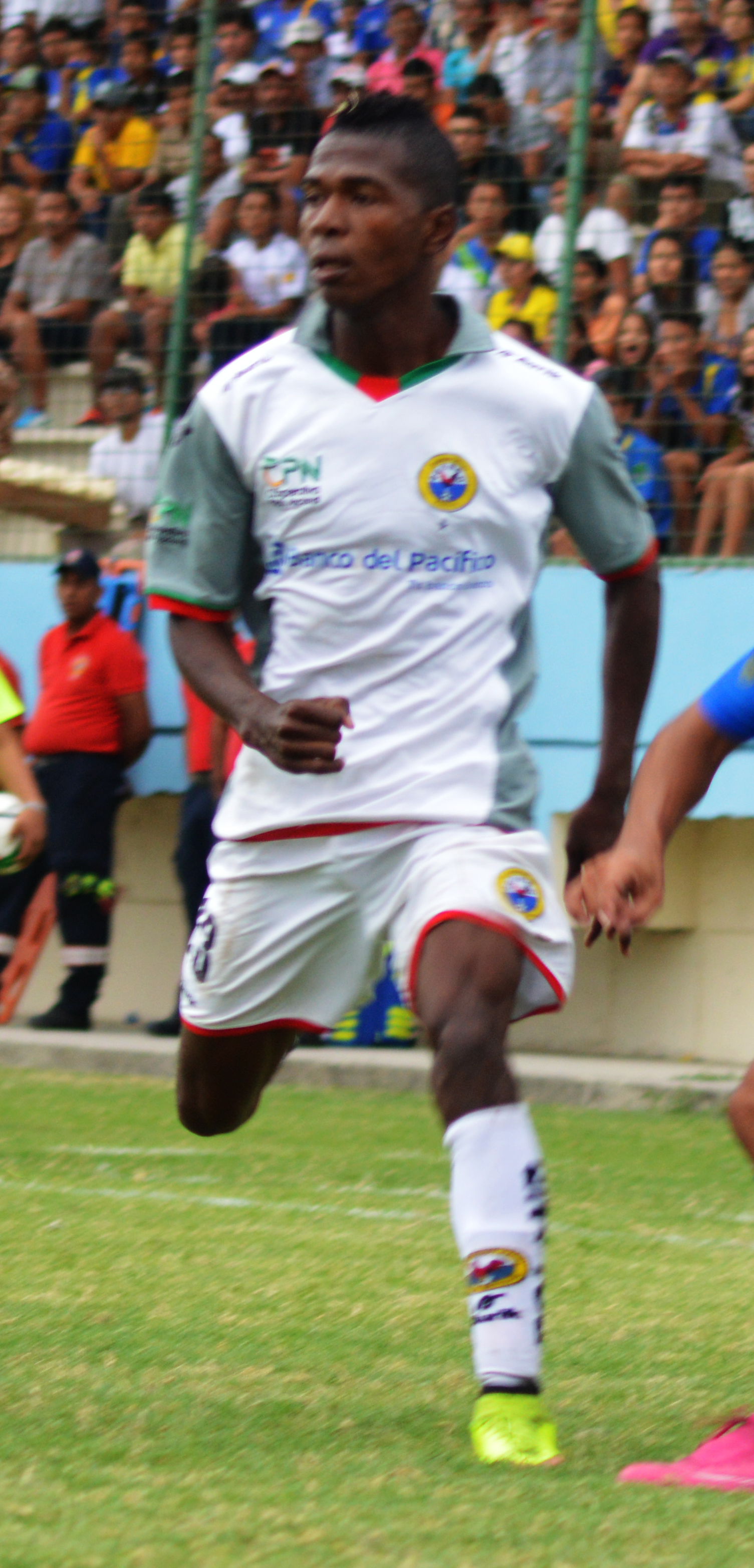
- Orejuela in 2015

Personal information
- Full name: Carlos Alfredo Orejuela Quiñonez
- Date of birth: 14 March 1993 (age 33)
- Place of birth: Esmeraldas, Ecuador
- Height: 1.73 m (5 ft 8 in)
- Position: Forward

Team information
- Current team: Mushuc Runa
- Number: 32

Senior career*
Years	Team	Apps	(Gls)
2011–2015	Olmedo	37	(0)
2015–2016	Espoli	0	(0)
2015–2016	Mushuc Runa	33	(3)
2017–2021	Emelec	58	(7)
2020	→ Orense (loan)	7	(0)
2021	→ Deportivo Cuenca (loan)	21	(3)
2022	Ferroviária	10	(1)
2022	Chapecoense	14	(0)
- * Club domestic league appearances and goals as of 13 July 2022

Carlos Alfredo Orejuela Quiñonez (born 14 March 1993), is an Ecuadorian professional footballer who plays as a striker for Mushuc Runa.

== Career ==
Orejuela made his professional debut on 30 January 2011 for CD Olmedo against LDU Quito in a 1–0 victory.

== Honours ==
Emelec

- Serie A: 2017
