= List of Argentine musicians =

This is a list of notable musicians and singers from or associated with Argentina:

- Alejandro Toledo (musician)
- Almendra
- Ataque 77
- Babasónicos
- Bizarrap
- Callejeros (members included Patricio Fontanet and Eduardo Vázquez)
- Cazzu
- Charly García
- Don Osvaldo (lead vocalist Patricio Fontanet)
- Duki(Rapper)
- Emilia Mernes
- Fito Páez
- Flema
- Fundación Cultural Patagonia String Quartet
- Gustavo Cerati
- Indica – Rock band formed in 2006 in Buenos Aires
- Juan Carlos Cobos
- Juana Molina
- Kapanga
- Khea
- L-Gante
- La Empoderada Orquesta Atípica
- La Renga
- Lali Espósito
- Lex Talion – Viking metal/folk metal band
- Lit Killah
- Los Auténticos Decadentes
- Los Enanitos Verdes
- Los Fabulosos Cadillacs
- Los Pericos
- María Becerra
- Martha Argerich
- Miranda!
- Nicki Nicole
- Patricio Rey y sus Redonditos de Ricota
- Paulo Londra
- Pescado Rabioso
- Puente Celeste
- Serú Girán
- Soda Stereo
- Skay Beilinson
- Sui Generis
- Tiago PZK
- Tini(Singer)
- Todos Tus Muertos
- Virus (band)
- Xavier Moyano

== See also ==
- List of Argentines
- Lists of musicians
