= Buenos Aires Central Market =

Central market in Buenos Aires

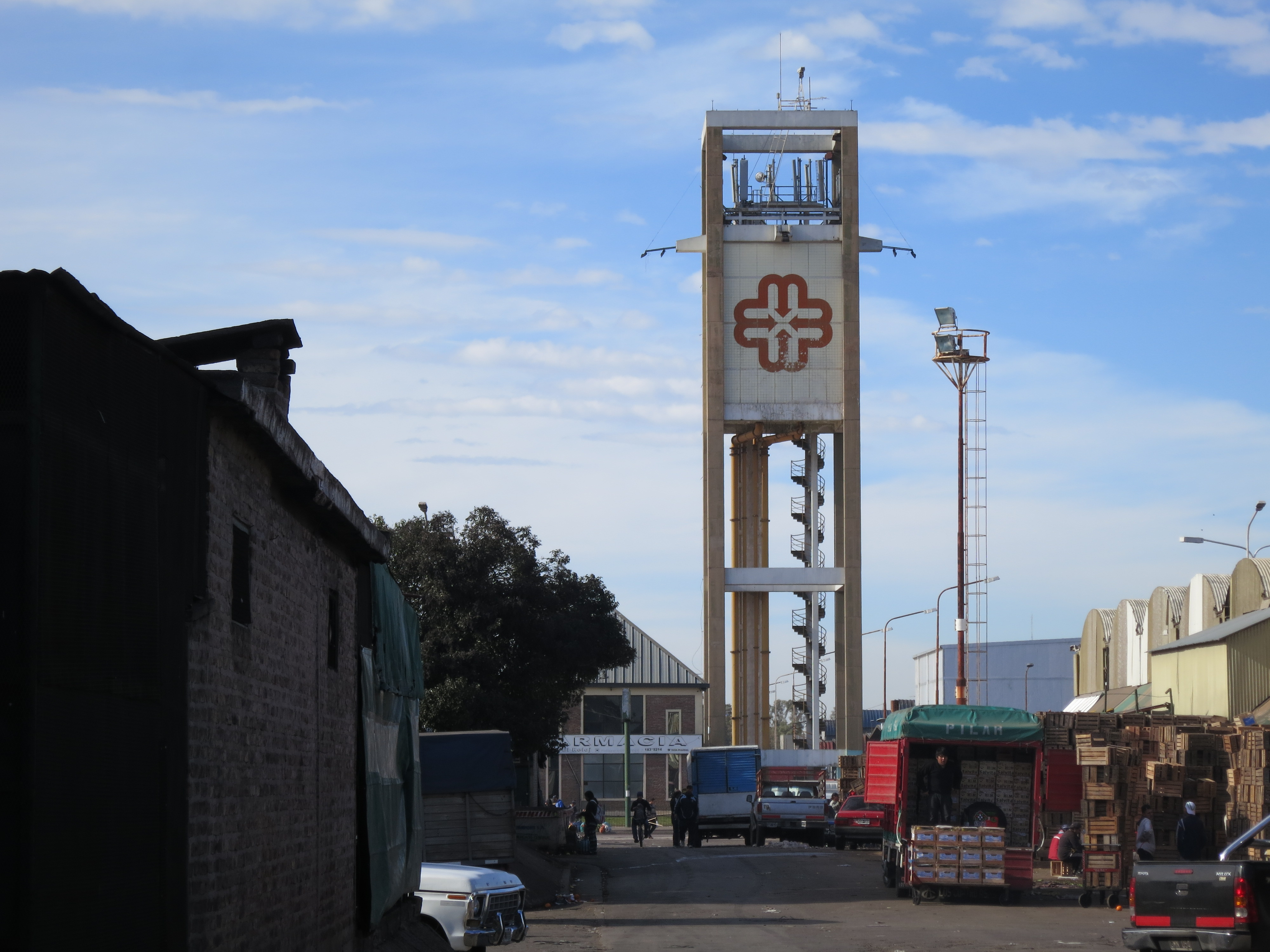
The Buenos Aires Central Market is the largest wholesale distribution center in Argentina.

The Buenos Aires Central Market (Spanish: Mercado Central de Buenos Aires, MCBA, pronounced [meɾˈkado senˈtɾal de bwenos ˈaiɾes]) is the main wholesale distribution center for food and horticultural products in Argentina and one of the largest of its kind worldwide. Located in the La Matanza Partido (department), Buenos Aires Province, it supplies the daily demand of the Greater Buenos Aires metropolitan area.

The market is administered by the Buenos Aires Central Market Corporation (Spanish: Corporación del Mercado Central de Buenos Aires), an interstate public entity with legal capacity in both public and private law, jointly managed by the national, provincial and city governments.

== History ==
The project was inspired by major European wholesale markets such as Mercabarna (Barcelona) and Rungis International Market (Paris), with the goal of modernizing and centralizing wholesale fresh fruit and vegetable trade in metropolitan Buenos Aires.

In 1971 a national competition selected the architectural design by the firm Llauró-Urgell y Asociados, assisted by engineers Arturo Bignoli and Federico B. Camba. Construction, carried out by Seidman y Bonder S.A., began in 1973 and extended for over fifteen years. The market was formally inaugurated on 15 October 1984, during the presidency of Raúl Alfonsín, under the management of the Secretariat of Domestic Trade led by Marta Más. It was recognized as the first major public work of Argentina's democratic transition.

The Buenos Aires provincial Law No. 10202 (1984) mandated that wholesale purchases in most partidos of Greater Buenos Aires had to be conducted at the Central Market, consolidating its role as the region's exclusive supply hub. This measure replaced approximately 25 local wholesale markets that had previously handled more than 2,000,000 tons annually.

Over time the market expanded its product range beyond staples such as potatoes, onions, and garlic, incorporating imported items like kiwifruit and blueberries in line with changing consumer habits.

== Location ==
The market is in Tapiales, La Matanza, bounded by the Riccheri Highway (National Route A002), Boulogne Sur Mer Avenue, and the Roca and Belgrano railway lines. It lies south of Tapiales, east of Ciudad Evita, west of Villa Celina, and north of Ingeniero Budge.

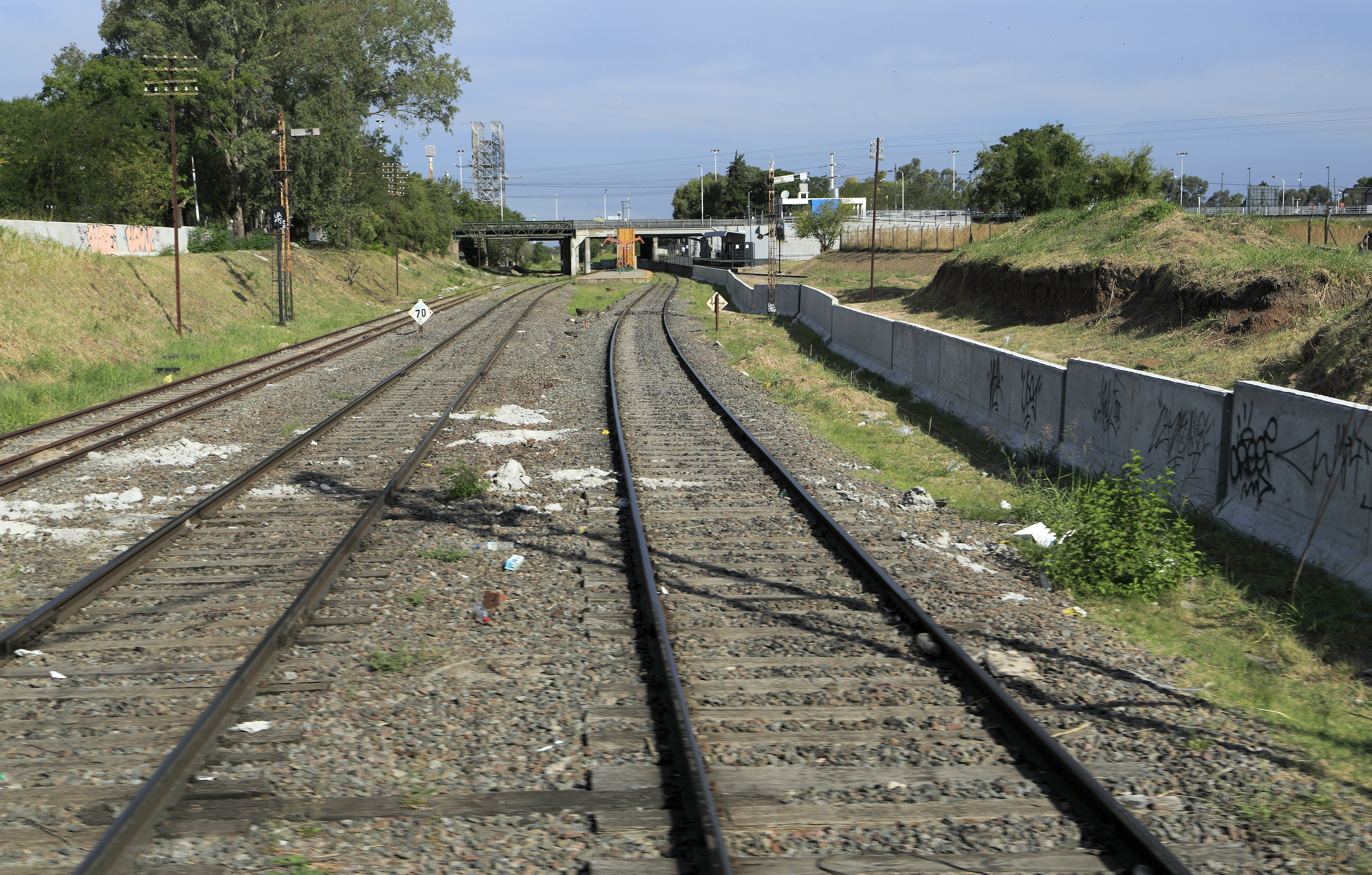
Double broad gauge track of the Haedo-Temperley branch of Roca railway runs near the Central Market.

Access points include a northern entrance for both private vehicles and trucks via Exit 17 of the Riccheri Highway (towards Ezeiza International Airport), and a southern entrance mainly for freight transport via Ramón Carrillo Avenue, with direct connection to General Paz Avenue only 2 km from Buenos Aires city limits.

The complex is served by colectivo (bus lines) 8, 56, 86, 91, 92, 143, 162 and 298. It also has freight rail connections and is close to the triple railway junction formed by the Ingeniero Castello station (Belgrano Sur Line), and the Kilómetro 12 (Belgrano Sur Line) and Agustín de Elía (Roca Line) stops.

== Facilities ==
Conceived as a modular complex, the market occupies a site of 210 hectares (520 acres), and consists of 12 pavilions designed with prefabricated structures for ease of assembly and uniformity. The architecture emphasizes natural lighting and ventilation to preserve fresh produce.

The complex includes 12 wholesale fruit and vegetable warehouses, one for small and medium enterprises, and another for fish products. It also hosts a retail fair, the community fair S1 El Reloj, and several auxiliary facilities such as a museum, laboratory, the "Dr. Ramón Carrillo" Medical Center, a fire station, and a police station. Additional services on site include branches of the ANSES (social security agency), petrol stations (YPF and Axion), banking services (Banco Nación, Provincia, Credicoop, Santander), and wholesale supermarkets Diarco and Maxiconsumo.

== Administration ==
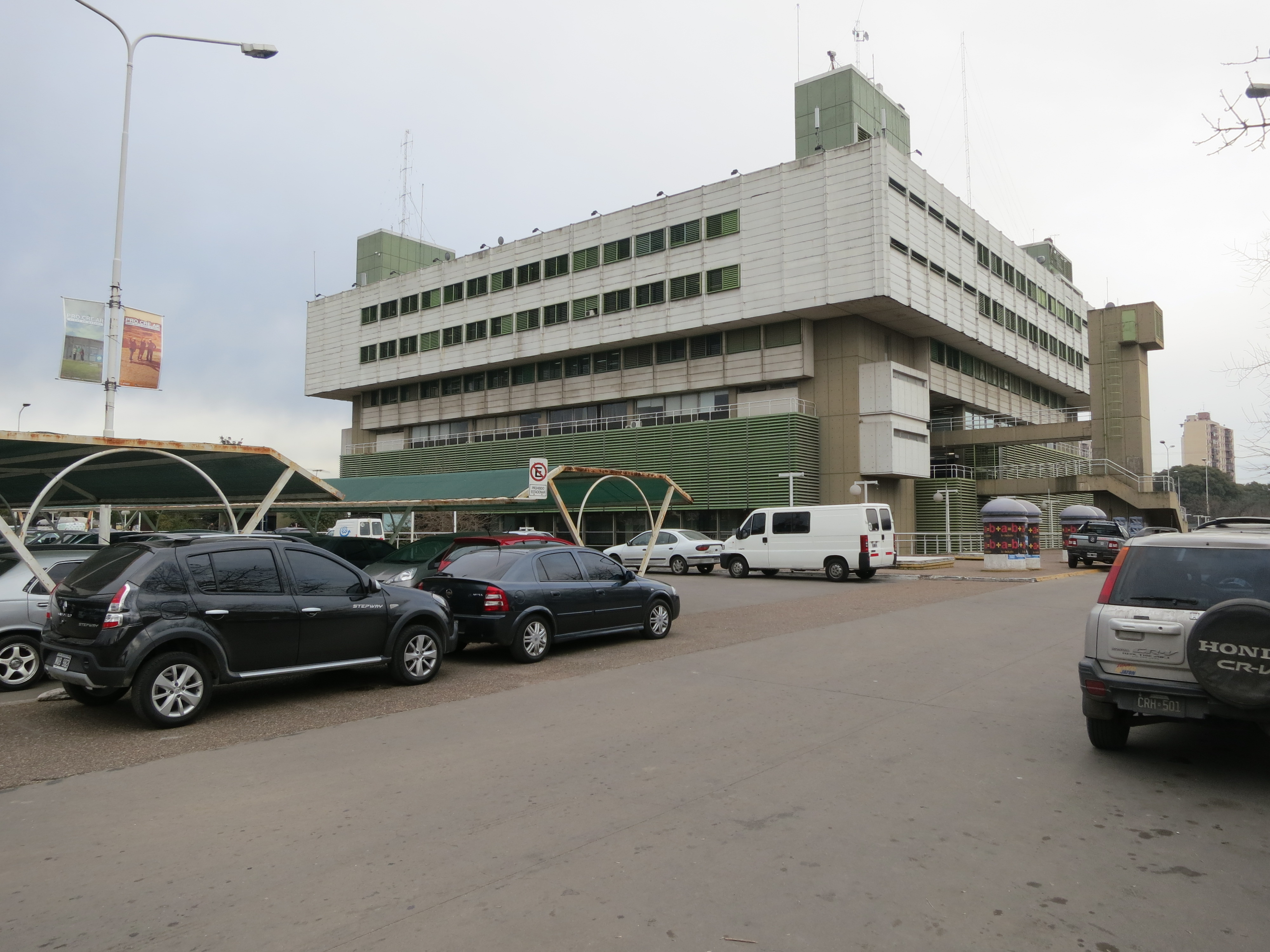
The MCBA is administered from the central building, which has a panoramic view of the entire property.

The MCBA is governed under a tripartite scheme, in which the national, provincial and city governments have 33% of shares each. Its guiding principles include transparency in transactions, balancing the interests of producers, wholesalers, and retailers, and promoting healthy nutrition. The corporation also develops social responsibility programs and invests in improving logistics efficiency.

Since 2018, the market has been a member of the World Union of Wholesale Markets (WUWM), alongside other major international markets such as Mercabarna and Mercamadrid (Spain), Central de Abasto (Mexico), Rungis (France), Borough Market (United Kingdom), and Lhasa Donggar Wholesale Market (China).

== Statistics ==
The MCBA supplies food to more than 12 million people in the Buenos Aires metropolitan area and receives 30,000–35,000 visitors daily, comparable to the activity of a small city.

According to its internal records:

- Around 106,000 tons of fruits and vegetables are traded monthly.
- Approximately 10,000 people participate in daily operations.
- The market hosts 900 wholesale stalls across its 12 warehouses.
- Roughly 700 trucks enter the site each day.
- More than 100 major companies operate within its agrifood and logistics hub.

== Future development ==
The MCBA is projected as a regional food and logistics hub, with plans for infrastructure upgrades and an initial investment estimated at USD 13.6 million. Additionally, the 2013 Master Plan for the Extraport Area of the Port of Buenos Aires envisions integrating the Central Market into a multimodal logistics platform connected to the port through road, rail, and river transport networks.
