= Tapiales =

- Town
- Location in Greater Buenos Aires
- Coordinates: 34°42′21″S 58°30′17″W
- Country: Argentina
- Province: Buenos Aires
- Partido: La Matanza
- Established: January 22, 1902

Area
  - Total: 4.8 km^{2} (1.9 sq mi)
- Elevation: 30 m (98 ft)

Population (2001 census [INDEC])
  - Total: 15,158
  - Density: 3,200/km^{2} (8,200/sq mi)
- CPA Base: B 1770
- Area code: +54 011
- Website: Municipio de La Matanza: Tapiales

Tapiales is a town in Argentina. It is located in La Matanza Partido and forms part of Greater Buenos Aires. Tapiales had a population of 15,158 at the 2001 census.

Tapiales was established in 1902 by Agustín Elía along the recently inaugurated Buenos Aires Western Railway (Spanish: Ferrocarril Oeste de Buenos Aires). Elía, who had purchased the land from the estate of the former Vice President, Francisco Bernabé Madero, sold the property in 1906 to La Franco Argentina, a prominent Buenos Aires real estate company. Chacra de Los Tapiales ("adobe wall ranch"), built by the Altolaguirre family in the early 19th century, gave the settlement its name and remains as a town landmark.

La Franco Argentina, in turn, sold the land in lots to investors and prospective homeowners, and in 1908, the railway, in which La Franco Argentina owned a stake, inaugurated a station at the site, as well as a rail yard. The town was divided geographically by the opening of the Riccheri Freeway in 1952, built to connect Buenos Aires to the recently inaugurated Ministro Pistarini International Airport 8 mi (13 km) to the southwest.

Tapiales grew significantly in the subsequent decade with the construction from 1968 to 1971 of a 900-unit cooperative housing complex by El Hogar Obrero, a leading firm in the Argentine cooperative movement. It was later chosen as the site for the Buenos Aires Central Market; the nation's largest wholesale market, it was inaugurated in Tapiales in 1984 to replace the Abasto de Buenos Aires and is the town's largest employer.

== Notable citizens ==
- Patricio Fontanet (born 1979), vocalist of Callejeros and Don Osvaldo, born in Tapiales
