= Eduardo Vázquez =

Argentine musician and murderer (born 1975)

- Born: 31 August 1975 (age 51); Buenos Aires, Argentina
- Status: Incarcerated
- Occupation: Musician (formerly)
- Convictions: Aggravated murder (Taddei's case); Femicide (Taddei's case); Reckless homicide (Cromañón's case)
- Penalty: Life imprisonment (Taddei's murder); 6 years in prison (Cromañón's case)

Details
- Date apprehended: 4 November 2010 (Taddei's case)
- Imprisoned at: Devoto Prison Unit, Villa Devoto

Eduardo Arturo Vázquez (born 31 August 1975) is an Argentine former musician and convicted murderer currently serving a sentence of life in prison for the murder of his wife, Wanda Taddei, committed in February 2010.

In December 2004, Vázquez was the drummer of Callejeros during the Cromañón nightclub fire in Buenos Aires.

== Early life and career ==
Vázquez was born on 31 August 1975 in Belgrano, Buenos Aires, into an upper-middle-class family. His father, the owner of a travel agency, abandoned Vázquez when he was five years old. As a result of the separation, Vázquez's mother had to work as a cashier at a supermarket to support his needs. They moved to Villa Celina, in La Matanza Partido, in 1980, where Vázquez met his friends with whom he would found Callejeros.

After his mother gifted him a drum set, Vázquez began pursuing a musical career. In 1995, led by vocalist Patricio Fontanet, a group of boys started meeting to rehearse, soon forming a band named Río Verde (Spanish for Green River). That song by Creedence Clearwater Revival inspired them to start doing music together. By the early 2000s, Callejeros had reached a high level of recognition within Argentine rock, incorporating other musicians like Maximiliano Djerfy and frequently giving concerts at numerous nightclubs.

== Cromañón and Taddei's murder ==
On 30 December 2004, while Callejeros was giving a concert at the República de Cromañón nightclub in Balvanera, a fire engulfed the building after a spectator threw flares, which impacted a cloth net in the ceiling. The fire spread quickly, causing Argentina's worst non-natural disaster. A total of 194 people died, and thousands of others were injured. As a result of the scandal that arose from the negligence at the facility's permission to hold such a massive event, several people were indicted and tried over the tragedy, including Cromañón's manager Omar Chabán and high-ranking police officers. Callejeros's members were also tried for their role in the event's organization. In August 2009, Chabán, his business partner, and others involved were convicted, while all of Callejeros' members were acquitted. Vázquez's mother, Dilva Lucía Paz, died in the fire, which left him profoundly affected. The tragedy in Cromañón left Vázquez dealing with post-traumatic stress disorder; he moved to Córdoba soon afterwards and said he was considering suicide when his daughter Valentina was born, making him change his mind. Vázquez also credited his bandmates and other friends with saving his life because they made frequent visits to his home in Córdoba when he was depressed.

On 21 February 2010, Vázquez's wife Wanda Taddei died from severe burn injuries ten days after being doused with alcohol and lit on fire by Vázquez. He said that Taddei was cleaning a shelf with alcohol bottles on top and that one of these bottles fell during an argument between both. Vázquez added that he lit a cigarette, which caused the alcohol to ignite, stating that Taddei caught fire while attempting to assist him in putting out the flames. The prosecution did not believe Vázquez's version and ordered further investigations. On 4 November 2010, Vázquez was arrested and charged with Taddei's aggravated murder.

Vázquez's trial for the murder of his wife was delayed when, in April 2011, the Court of Cassation revoked the acquittal of Callejeros band members in the Cromañón case and ordered a review. They were subsequently tried again, this time being convicted for their role in the fire. On 17 October 2012, Vázquez was sentenced to six years in prison for Cromañón's case. The court ordered that Callejeros had to start serving their prison time in that moment. By the time of his sentencing in the nightclub fire, Vázquez's trial for Taddei's murder had already concluded. In 2016, the Supreme Court finalized the proceedings against Callejeros, upholding their convictions.

The first instance of Vázquez's proceedings began on 28 February 2012 and finished on 14 June when he was found guilty under mitigating factors related to violent emotions that Vázquez allegedly felt and acted on in the killing. He was sentenced to 18 years in prison, with the prosecution filing an immediate appeal to upper courts. A higher-instance court vacated the first-instance ruling and sentenced Vázquez to life imprisonment on 18 September 2013. This time, his defense announced an appeal to the Court of Cassation, which accepted hearing the case on 7 November 2014. The tribunal took nearly two years to file a verdict; in September 2016, the Court of Cassation concurred with the state and upheld Vázquez's life sentence, arguing that he had been involved in a violent relationship with Taddei. The ruling also revoked the mitigating factors from the first trial.

Since his sentence in September 2016, Vázquez was first incarcerated at the Federal Penitentiary Complex in Ezeiza and was later transferred to Devoto, where he was granted temporary release to spend time with his new wife and daughter in December 2025. Vázquez had married his second wife while in prison in June 2018. During his stay in Ezeiza, Vázquez shared cell with Jorge Mangeri, serving a life sentence for the June 2013 sexual assault and murder of 16-year-old Ángeles Rawson in Palermo, Buenos Aires. While the guarantees court approved his transitional release, the Federal Penitentiary Service, the Public Safety Ministry, and Taddei's family issued a statement opposing the move, considering that Vázquez is not fully rehabilitated.
