= CJS =

CJS may refer to:

- Certified Journeyman Safecracker, an American trade qualification awarded to members of the National Safeman's Organization
- Corpus Juris Secundum, an encyclopedia of U.S. law
- Collège Jeanne-Sauvé, a high school in Winnipeg, Manitoba, Canada
- Ciudad Juárez International Airport, IATA airport code: CJS
- Callejeros, Argentine rock band
- Cairo Japanese School
- Casi Justicia Social, Argentine Rock band
- Criminal justice system
- Captain Jack Sparrow, the protagonist of the Pirates of the Caribbean film franchise
- CommonJS, a standardization project for JavaScript module ecosystem outside web browsers
