= Rolinga =

Argentine urban tribe comprising fans of the Rolling Stones

Rolinga, rollinga, or "stones" are names of an Argentine subculture comprising fans of the Rolling Stones and Argentine bands influenced by the aforementioned group. The musical genre associated with such bands is known as "rock rolinga". The term "stone" in Argentina is also used to refer to any fan of the Rolling Stones, regardless of whether they belong to this particular subculture or not.

== History ==
=== Origins and heyday ===
In the 1970s, Argentine fans of the Rolling Stones in Buenos Aires began to call themselves "stones" and tried to emulate the style of clothing worn by the English band. Ratones Paranoicos, who played a style similar to the Rolling Stones, launched the genre that became known as "rock rolinga" in the 1980s.

The rolinga subculture flourished starting in the 1990s, after the Rolling Stones first played in Argentina, in 1995, during the Voodoo Lounge Tour. A number of rolinga bands emerged at this time, including Los Piojos, Viejas Locas, La 25, Los Gardelitos, Jóvenes Pordioseros, Los Guasones, and Callejeros. Their lyrics slowly departed from the classic topics of rock and roll music and focused instead on localism and the customs of poor people—but not to the point of talking about idealistic struggles or purported revolutions.

Other bands whose music has been classified under the rolinga moniker include Riff, Memphis la Blusera or Patricio Rey y sus Redonditos de Ricota, Bersuit Vergarabat, La Renga, Divididos, Los Piojos, and Las Pelotas.

=== Decline ===
During the early- to mid-2000s, the rolinga urban tribe started to lose popularity with the advent of the cumbia villera genre and the subculture associated with it. The subculture's decline was rather slow, until it was accelerated by the República Cromañón nightclub fire, which took place during a Callejeros concert. Most of the movement's leading bands broke up or changed style, and new musical genres became prominent. Political reactions to the fire included increased safety controls at nightclubs in Buenos Aires, which made the concerts of small bands very expensive. The subculture remained in the suburbs of the Gran Buenos Aires urban area, especially the western zone, which the Buenos Aires Province administers, and where the same controls as in the city are not enforced.

== Bibliography ==
- Hernandez, Deborah Pacini (2004). Rockin' Las Américas. United States: University of Pittsburgh Press. ISBN 0-8229-4226-7.
- Pierri, Diego (2012). República Stone: Diario de viaje con los Rolling Stones por el mundo [Stone Republic: Travel diary with the Rolling Stones around the world] (in Spanish). Argentina: Music Brokers Argentina. ISBN 978-987-98873-8-7.
