= Murder of Ángeles Rawson =

2013 murder in Argentina

- Ángeles Rawson
- Location: Palermo, Buenos Aires, Argentina
- Date: 10 June 2013; 13 years ago
- Attack type: Murder by strangulation and suffocation during an attempted rape
- Victims: Ángeles Rawson, aged 16
- Perpetrator: Jorge Néstor Mangeri
- Motive: Conceal the sexual assault
- Verdict: Guilty
- Convictions: Life imprisonment (finalized by Supreme Court in 2018)

The murder of Ángeles Rawson (23 October 1996 – 10 June 2013) occurred in the apartment building where she lived with her family in Palermo, Buenos Aires, Argentina.

Rawson's body was found the day after her murder, on 11 June 2013, at a garbage processing center in General San Martín Partido, a suburb of Buenos Aires. An autopsy determined that the girl had been strangled and suffocated and that her killer had attempted to rape her. The case attracted strong social and media attention in Argentina.

Following intense investigation, on 15 June 2013, the building's doorman, 45-year-old Jorge Néstor Mangeri, confessed to killing Rawson after she resisted his attempts to rape her. He was convicted after subsequent DNA evidence established his guilt.

== Background and murder ==
Ángeles Rawson was a 16-year-old fourth-year high school student at the Virgen del Valle Institute in the Colegiales neighborhood. She lived with her mother, her mother's partner, and her siblings on the ground floor of a building at 2360 Ravignani Street in Palermo. Rawson was known to like Japanese culture, including anime, manga, and cosplaying, often being referred to as an otaku. On 10 June 2013, Rawson was last seen alive entering the building where she lived, capturing her image on CCTV security cameras at 9:50 a.m. Her body was found the following day by a municipal worker, wrapped inside a large supermarket bag in a garbage disposal plot in General San Martín Partido, a suburb outside Buenos Aires.

Due to the nature of the crime, the Argentine Federal Police quickly intervened and summoned the building's doorman, Jorge Néstor Mangeri, to give a formal statement about the last time he had seen the teenager. As investigators ruled out any involvement by Rawson's mother and stepfather, they pressed and challenged Mangeri's version of the events. On 15 June, visibly upset by viewing the CCTV footage, Mangeri confessed to the murder of the girl. He later claimed that he was kidnapped and tortured by federal police and that his confession was forced. Mangeri had initially denied the crime and said that he was respected by the building's tenants, including Rawson's family.

Mangeri's humble manners and modest origins initially confused investigators, who did not believe that the doorman, being cherished by the building's residents, could be involved in the crime. Other neighbors, however, accused Mangeri of harassing women and making sexual propositions to former female employees in the building. By the time of Rawson's murder, Mangeri was married to Diana Saettone, whose cousin, a former member of the Buenos Aires Provincial Police, would become entangled in the investigation.

Since a confession is not legally valid to convict someone of a crime in Argentine law, Mangeri's guilt was determined by the discovery of DNA evidence confirming that Rawson tried to defend herself against Mangeri, scratching him in the face and leaving more than 34 injuries in his body. The investigation determined that Mangeri, upon seeing the teenager enter the building on 10 June, lured her to a common area where he would not be seen. It has not been determined whether this was the building's basement or a space under renovation near the family apartment. There, Mangeri attempted to rape the teenager, who resisted so fiercely that he strangled and suffocated her by covering her mouth and nose. Mangeri killed Rawson within five minutes. The girl additionally suffered from five fractured ribs, along with her right clavicle and a vertebra.

After killing Rawson, Mangeri left the body at the scene for five hours, placing it in a garbage bag and making it appear to be rubble from plumbing repairs. The prosecution believed that Mangeri did not raise suspicions by carrying a large bag because neighbors were used to seeing him doing hard chores. He subsequently used his 1998 Renault Mégane to take the remains to a nearby garbage container, where he discarded Rawson's body.

Mangeri's trial concluded on 15 July 2015, when Buenos Aires City Criminal Court No. 9 sentenced him to life imprisonment, which was upheld on appeal by the Court of Cassation in 2017. In 2018, the Supreme Court finalized Mangeri's appeals, confirming his life sentence. He is serving his sentence at the Rawson Federal Prison in Rawson, Chubut Province. Mangeri and his inner circle continue to maintain his innocence, claiming that he was tortured and framed by police.

=== Perpetrator ===
Jorge Néstor Mangeri was born on 1 January 1968 in San Miguel, Buenos Aires. He reportedly had a bad relationship with his mother. Mangeri was known for his obsessive fixation with cleaning his car and keeping things in order. Besides, neighbors noted him as a reserved man who was sometimes flirtatious toward women. As for the relationship with his wife Diana Saettone, Mangeri showed extreme dependency and attachment, developing a sense of overbearing responsibility in taking care of her well-being. Acquaintances of the couple also reported that Mangeri's biggest frustration was being unable to have children with his wife, especially due to Saettone's health issues.

Before beginning to work as a doorman in the early 2000s, Mangeri had held numerous short-lived jobs, ranging from laying bricks to working at a bakery and later as a factory metalworker.

== Aftermath ==
In December 2017, Cecilio Antonio Saettone, a cousin of Mangeri's wife, was convicted of perjury for advising him to state that he had been tortured by police in order to succeed in the appellate process. He was sentenced to four years in prison but escaped before he could be arrested to serve the sentence. Due to Saettone having been a member of a provincial police body, his recommendation to Mangeri constituted a crime; his sentence was ratified afterwards. Saettone's sentence was upheld on appeal in December 2020. He was recaptured and imprisoned in September 2023.

Rawson's murder remains one of the most known criminal cases in recent Argentine history. It became the second most searched news item on Google in 2013 in Argentina, just below the news related to the death of Canadian actor Cory Monteith. The Buenos Aires City Legislature placed a memorial plaque in the Plaza del Jacarandá on Avenida Santa Fe to honor Rawson and all victims of violence against women in Argentina.

During his imprisonment in Ezeiza, Mangeri shared a cell with Callejeros former drummer Eduardo Vázquez, convicted for the February 2010 murder of his wife.

In March 2025, Infobae published a note with never-before-seen videos of Mangeri confessing to details of the crime but being unable to explain his motives. He also said that Rawson's death was an accident that occurred while he was trying to rape her.
