= Patricio Fontanet =

Argentine musician (born 1979)

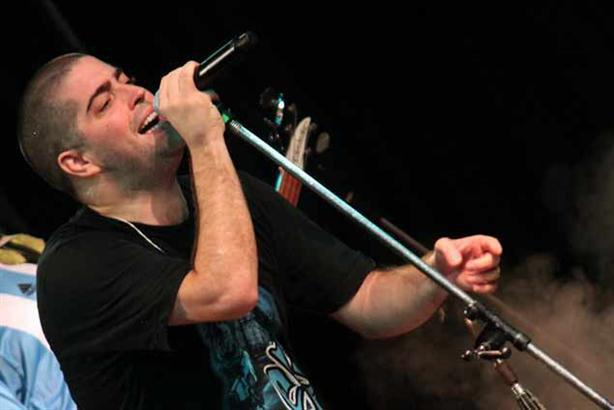
- Fontanet in October 2012
- Born: Patricio Rogelio Santos Fontanet; 16 June 1979 (age 47); Tapiales, Buenos Aires Province, Argentina
- Status: Paroled in May 2018 (unconditional release later)
- Occupation: Musician (singer-songwriter)
- Partner: Estefanía Miguel
- Children: 1 son
- Conviction: Reckless homicide
- Penalty: 7 years in prison

Details
- Date apprehended: 20 December 2012; 7 April 2016 (final appeal)

Patricio Rogelio Santos Fontanet (born 16 June 1979) is an Argentine singer-songwriter known for being the vocalist of the Argentine rock band Callejeros and the founder of Don Osvaldo.

In December 2004, he was involved in the Cromañón nightclub fire, where he was singing with Callejeros.

== Early life and musical career ==
Fontanet was born on 16 June 1979 in Tapiales, a small town in La Matanza Partido of Buenos Aires Province. His parents were José Santos and Susana Graciela Fontanet. An enthusiast of Argentine rock, Fontanet began rehearsing with a group of boys in a garage of a home in Villa Celina in 1995. Some time later, they debuted in front of a barbershop in La Matanza and began recruiting members for the band.

The group Callejeros, a well-known and recognized band in Argentina's national rock, began its path to fame under the name of Green River (in Spanish, Río Verde), inspiring themselves in the eponymous song of Creedence Clearwater Revival. Over time, the band incorporated drummers and guitarists, including Eduardo Vázquez. By the early 2000s, Callejeros had reached a high level of recognition within Argentine rock, incorporating other musicians like Maximiliano Djerfy, and frequently giving concerts at numerous nightclubs.

On 30 December 2004, Callejeros was giving a concert at the República de Cromañón nightclub in Balvanera when a flare thrown by a spectator impacted a cloth net in the ceiling, quickly spreading a fire that killed 194 people and injured more than 1500 others. Among the victims of the tragedy was Fontanet's girlfriend, 21-year-old Mariana Silotta, who succumbed to her injuries on 12 January 2005. His mother Susana was injured but survived. Fontanet himself was also hospitalized due to smoke inhalation.

== Legal proceedings ==
Following his recovery, Fontanet and the rest of the band members of Callejeros, as well as Cromañón's manager Omar Chabán, Callejeros' manager Diego Argañaraz, and other high-ranking officials, were indicted in the deaths at the nightclub, accused, among other charges, of reckless homicide. In June 2005, Fontanet sued the parents of a man who died in Cromañón for allegedly assaulting his father. In August 2009, Chabán and others were convicted, with Chabán receiving a 20-year prison term. Callejeros' members, including Fontanet, were acquitted. The state appealed to the Court of Cassation, which in April 2011 reversed the first-instance ruling and ordered Callejeros to stand trial again.

On 17 October 2012, Callejeros members were all convicted for their role in the fire. Fontanet was sentenced to seven years in prison, which was ratified on 20 December 2012. Fontanet was traveling with his wife and his son, Homero, in Córdoba when he was informed about the ruling, subsequently suffering a mental breakdown. He was admitted to a psychiatric hospital in Córdoba and later transferred to the psychiatric unit of the Ezeiza Penitentiary Federal Complex in Ezeiza, Buenos Aires. The Supreme Court upheld the band members' sentences in April 2016, with Fontanet being unable to request parole because he had never participated in a workshop while in prison, a requirement for a good evaluation.

In May 2018, a court granted him parole after serving six and a half years of his seven-year prison term.

== Personal life and aftermath ==
Fontanet and his partner Estefanía Miguel had a son named Homero, born in October 2012. Fontanet's father José Santos died while he was in prison in November 2017, with a court granting him a brief supervised release to attend the funeral and accompany his mother.

In November 2010, Fontanet and other Callejeros members founded the Argentine rock band Don Osvaldo. After his definitive release in May 2018, Fontanet became active again, though sporadically, in Argentine music. He appeared in 2021 and 2022 in neighborhood clubs and in a concert near the Obelisco de Buenos Aires. Fontanet's performances have received generally positive reactions, with the exception of civic associations related to some families of Cromañón victims who have filed petitions to declare Fontanet persona non grata in several localities in Argentina.
