= Maximiliano Djerfy =

Argentine musician (1974–2021)

- Born: 4 November 1974; Valentín Alsina, Buenos Aires Province, Argentina
- Died: 12 March 2021 (aged 46); Lanús, Buenos Aires Province, Argentina
- Occupations: Musician (singer-songwriter and guitarist)

Maximiliano Djerfy (4 November 1974 – 12 March 2021) was an Argentine singer-songwriter and guitarist known for being a member of the Argentine rock band Callejeros.

He was involved in the Cromañón nightclub fire on 30 December 2004, which killed 194 people, including several of his relatives.

== Early life and musical career ==
Born in Valentín Alsina, Buenos Aires Province, on 4 November 1974, Djerfy joined Callejeros, a Villa Celina-based rock band, in early 2000. Along with Djerfy, saxophonist Juan Carbone also became one of the members. Djerfy developed his own style while playing with Callejeros, contributing considerably to the production of numerous of the band's hits.

In an album released in 2006, Djerfy sang some singles with main vocalist Patricio Fontanet. One of those songs had been written as a tribute to the victims of Cromañón and Djerfy's loved ones who died that night. While some sources initially attributed the song's authorship to Fontanet and said that he had composed it for his deceased girlfriend, it was later confirmed to have been authored by Djerfy.

In 2008, Djerfy was kicked out of Callejeros for refusing to continue performing while the criminal proceedings against them were still ongoing. The trial against the band members concluded in an initial acquittal in August 2009, a trial that ended in the conviction and 20-year prison sentence of Cromañón's manager, Omar Chabán. However, following the Court of Cassation's reversal of this first-instance ruling in April 2011, Callejeros faced another trial, concluding in their conviction on 17 October 2012. Djerfy was sentenced to five years in prison.

While showing disagreement with the convictions of Callejeros members, whom he considered a form of scapegoat for high-ranking public officials, Djerfy always expressed guilt and emotional pain for the deaths in Cromañón. After the verdict, Djerfy served prison time in the Federal Penitentiary Complex of Ezeiza and later at the Prison Unit in Marcos Paz. He was granted parole in late 2016 and completed his sentence shortly afterwards.

In 2010, Djerfy founded a small band named Esas Cosas, which produced two works. He later formed another group in 2014, Nuestra Raza, where he was joined by two former Callejeros members, Elio Delgado and Juan Carbone. They released their only album in 2020, shortly before Djerfy's death.

== Personal life and death ==
Djerfy was profoundly affected by Cromañón, where he lost his aunt, his uncle, a cousin and her boyfriend, and his goddaughter. He recalled in an interview that he wished what happened to him to no one, saying that "no pibe deserves to go through that." He added that the relationship with his bandmates of Callejeros was strained as a result, drawing a comparison with a couple who experience an abortion. He also suffered from suicidal ideation, alleging that music saved his life.

Djerfy died on 12 March 2021 at the age of 46. He was playing an amateur football match in Lanús when he suffered a myocardial infarction. His funeral took place in Avellaneda the following day. On the third anniversary of his death, in March 2024, his lawyer Analía Fangano remembered Djerfy as the only Callejeros member who cooperated with the legal proceedings, showing extreme empathy and guilt for the tragedy.

After his death, Nuestra Raza toured Argentina, performing in his honor.
