= Lanús =

City in Buenos Aires Province, Argentina

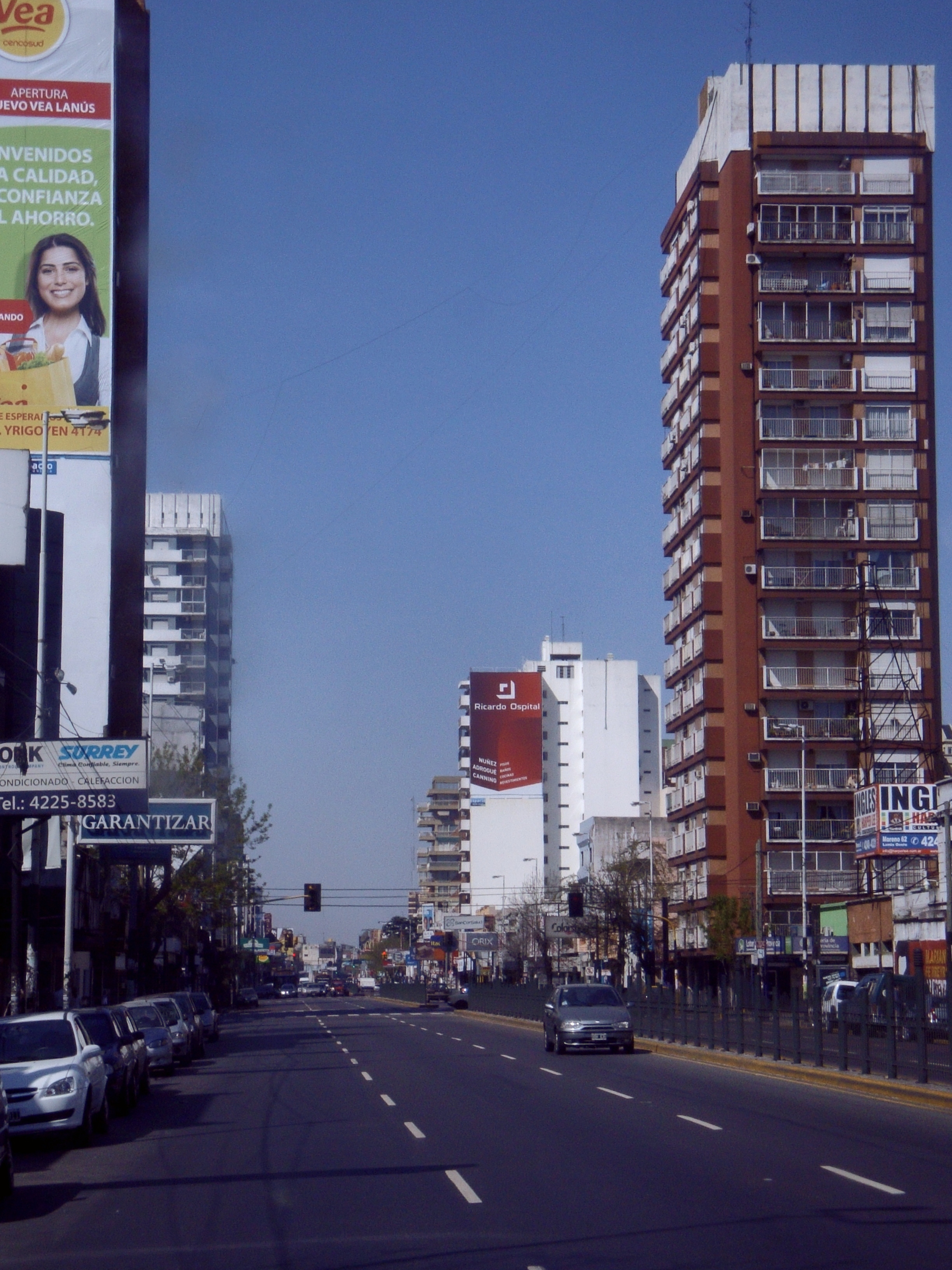
- Avenida Hipólito Yrigoyen

- Location in Greater Buenos Aires
- Coordinates: 34°42′S 58°24′W
- Country: Argentina
- Province: Buenos Aires
- Partido: Lanús
- Founded: October 20, 1888

Government
  - Intendant: Julián Álvarez (UxP)
- Elevation: 9 m (30 ft)

Population (2010 census [INDEC])
  - Total: 212,152
- Demonym: lanusense
- CPA Base: B 1824
- Area code: +54 11
- Patron saint: Santa Teresa de Jesus
- Website: www.lanus.gob.ar

Lanús (Spanish pronunciation: [laˈnus]) is the capital of Lanús Partido, Buenos Aires Province in Argentina. It lies just south of the capital city Buenos Aires, in the Greater Buenos Aires metropolitan area. The city has a population of 212,152 (2001 census [INDEC]), and the Partido de Lanús has a total population of 453,500.

== Overview ==
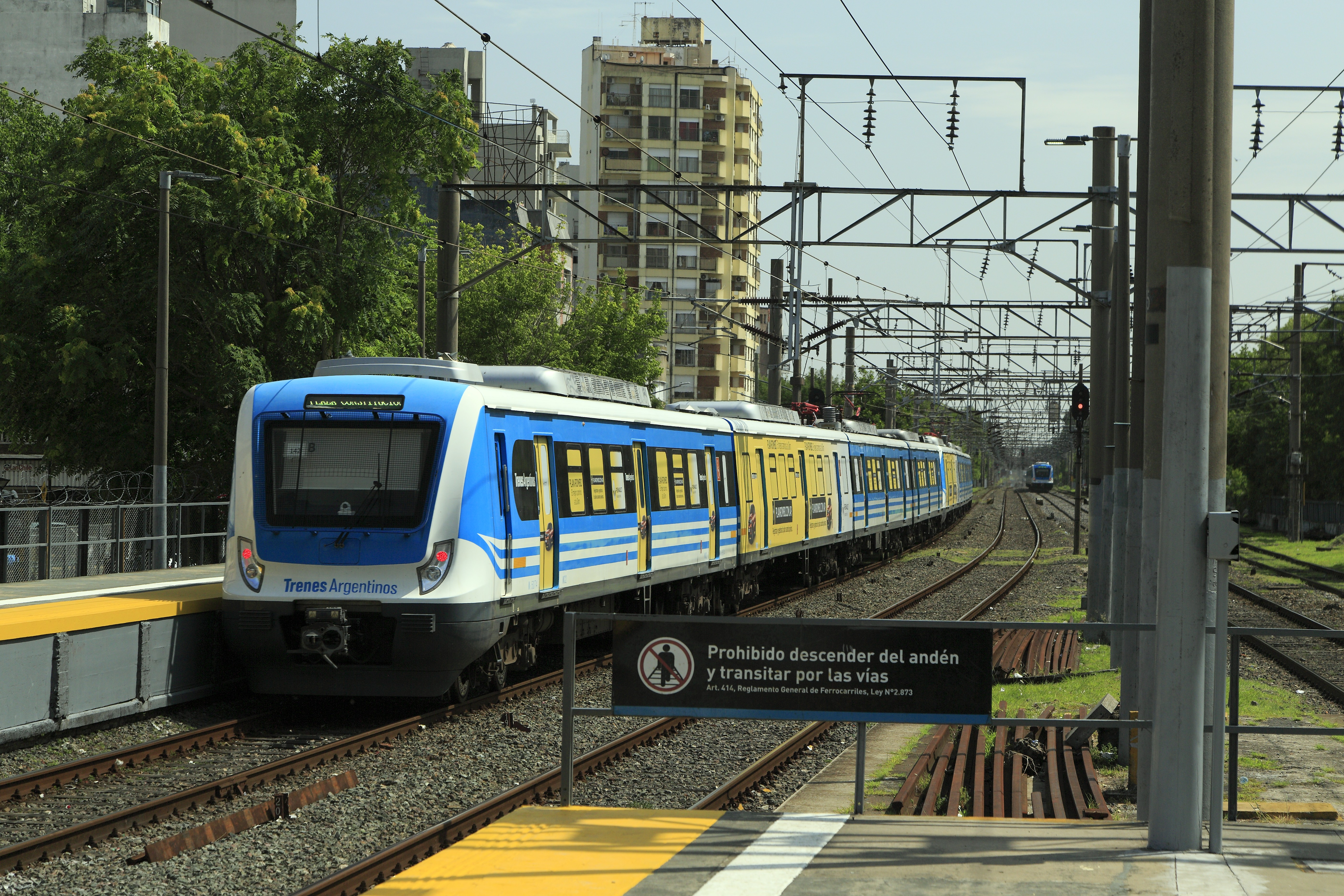
Lanús railway station.

A major industrial centre, it is served by freight and passenger railway lines. The city has chemical, armaments, textiles, paper, leather and rubber goods, wire, apparel, oils and lubricants industries, as well as tanneries, vegetable and fruit canneries. Several technical schools are located in the city, as well as the Eva Perón Medical Center, one of the largest in the Greater Buenos Aires area.

The city has a football club, Club Atlético Lanús currently playing in the Argentine Primera División. Club Atlético Lanús also has a basketball team.

Guillermo Gaebeler initiated the town's development, designing its first city master plan. Gaebeler established the town as Villa General Paz on October 20, 1888, and named its first streets and plazas after the numerous battles won by General José María Paz in the Argentine Civil Wars of the mid-19th century. Lanús was officially renamed in 1955 in honor of Anacarsis Lanús, who owned the land where the city is today located until his death in 1887.

== History ==
Before the Spanish conquest, the land that now comprises the Partido de Lanús was inhabited by indigenous tribes, including the Pampas and Guarani. The Pampas were a group of nomadic indigenous people who lived in the vast plains that gave them their name. They survived through hunting and gathering, using tools like bows and arrows and bolls for hunting and warfare.

The Guarani people, particularly the "Guaraníes de las Islas" group living in the estuary of the Plata River, had a more sedentary lifestyle. They sailed in large canoes and used weapons like macanas, bows, and arrows. They were skilled weavers and potters, making pottery from cotton and other plant fibers. When the Spanish arrived, they found Guarani settlements along the Plata River coast in what is now the Partido de Avellaneda and near the Puente de la Noria, where archaeological remains, especially ceramics, have been discovered.

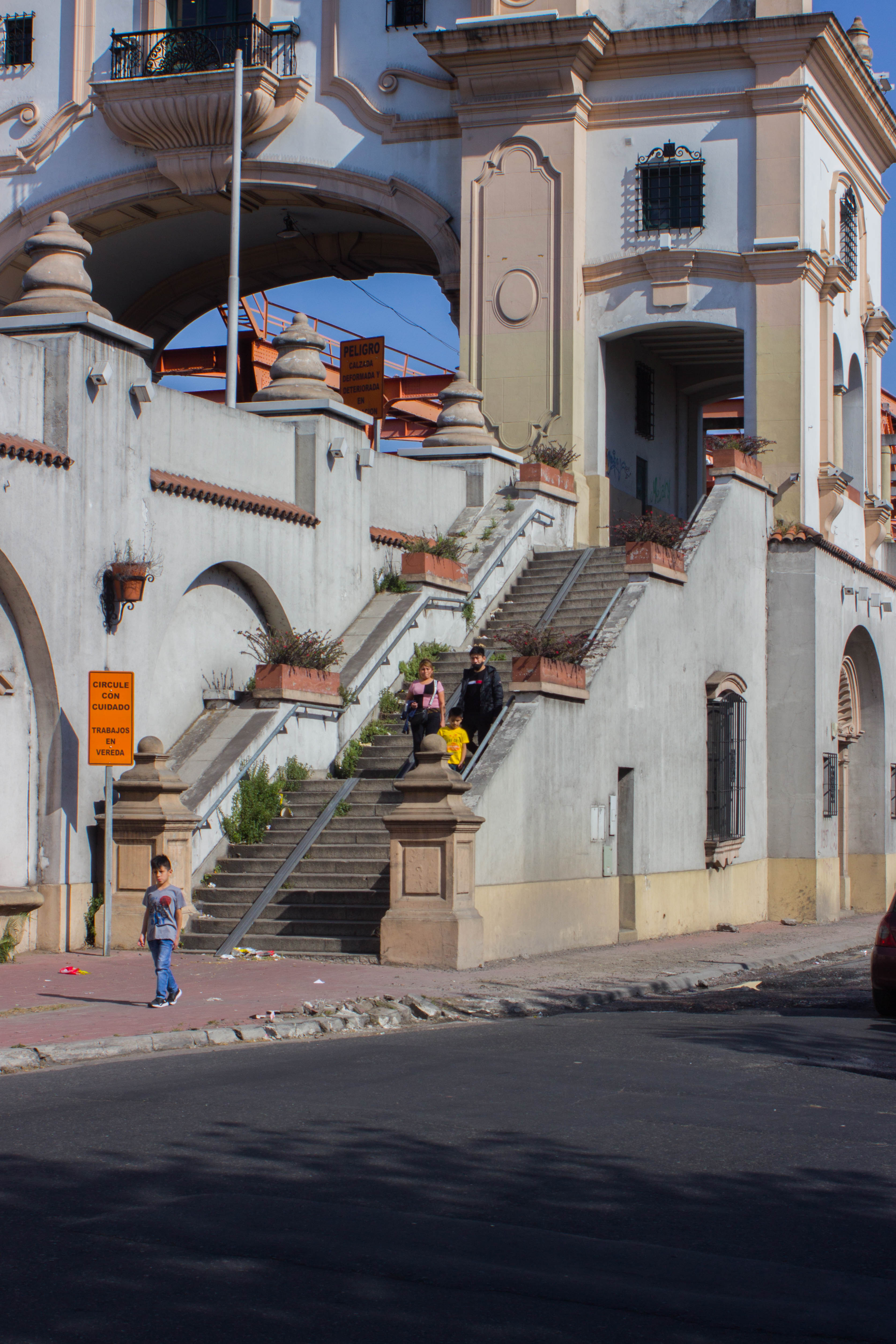
Valentín Alsina Bridge, which joins Buenos Aires and Valentín Alsina in the district of Lanús

=== Colonial Era ===
The first founding of Buenos Aires took place in 1536, near the Paso de Burgos, close to what is now the Uriburu Bridge, according to the historian S.J. Guillermo Furlong. This suggests that Lanús might have been the site of the oldest settlement in the future Viceroyalty of the Río de la Plata. This initial settlement had a short lifespan and was only permanently established in 1580 when Juan de Garay founded the city for the second time.

Following the Crown's orders, Juan de Garay distributed land to encourage permanent settlement, and residents were required to live there for five years, or else the authorities could reassign the land. The lands that are now part of the Partido de Lanús were part of the Magdalena payment, the La Matanza payment, and the area in between known as the payment of Riachuelo. The first landowners in the district included Juan Torres de Vera y Aragón, whose property was also known as Estancia del Adelantado. Since they didn't meet the residency requirement, their lands were later redistributed to various settlers, such as the cove of Juan Ruíz, Giovanna Gomez, and Pedro de Jerez.

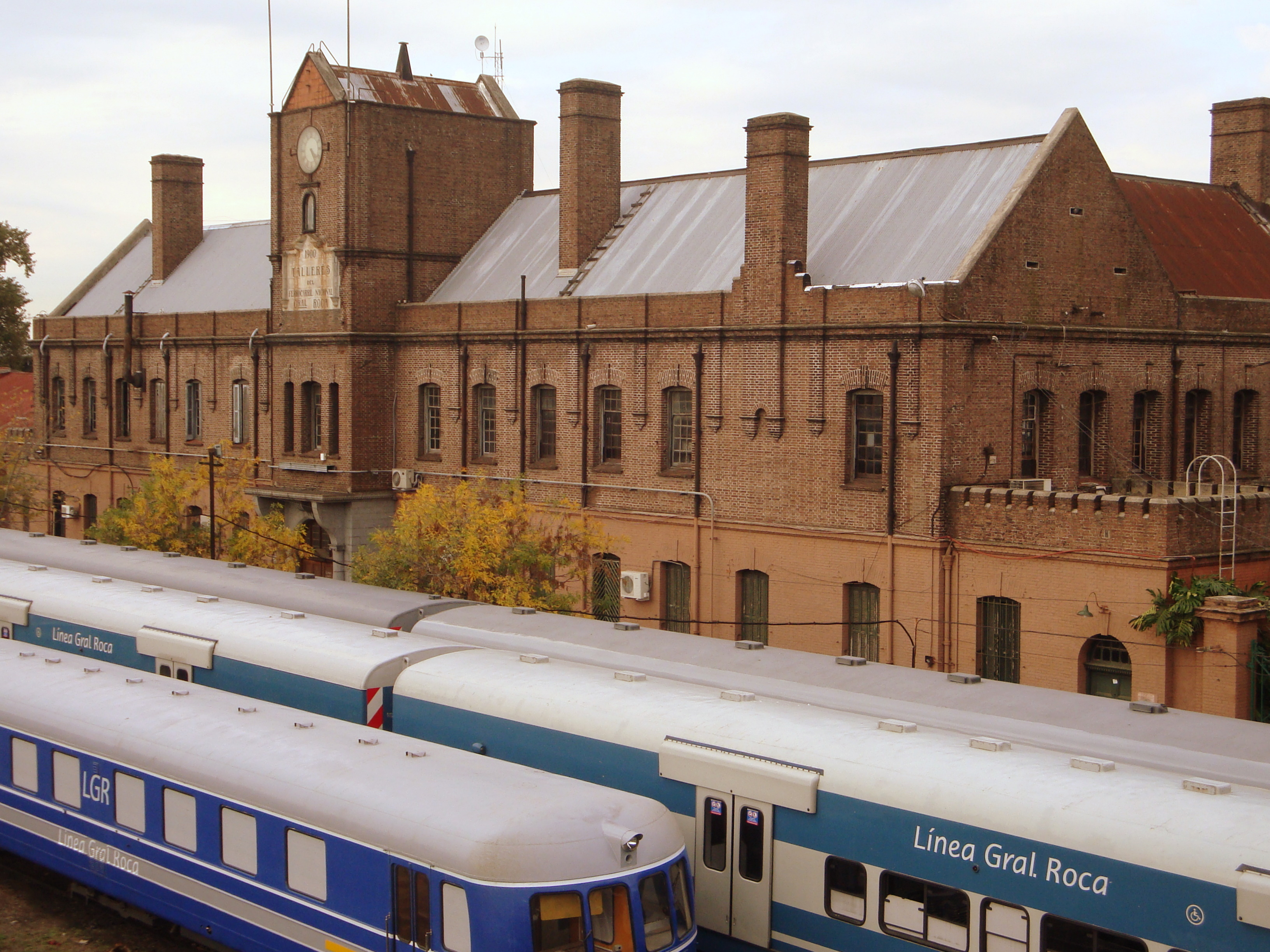
Railway Workshops "Remedios de Escalada" in Lanús,

=== Independence Era ===
Around 1856, the total population of the district was estimated to be 5,099 inhabitants, with only 2,444 of them being criollos. The rest consisted of 819 French, 528 Spanish, 496 Italians, 247 English, 217 Germans, and so on. The primary sources of employment were the thirteen saladeros (meat salting and processing establishments) and farms. There were ten bakeries, nine greengrocers, twelve butchers, eight meat-selling carts in the countryside, twenty-two stores, ninety-six small general stores, thirteen taverns, and twelve billiard halls. Throughout the district, there were 19 two-story houses and 203 one-story houses, with 1,217 being brick, thatched roof, or zinc-roofed huts. There were six educational institutions and two chapels: Nuestra Señora del Tránsito or Los Grigera in Lomas and Nuestra Señora del Rosario or the Italian chapel in Barracas al Sur.

=== Separation from the Partido de Avellaneda ===
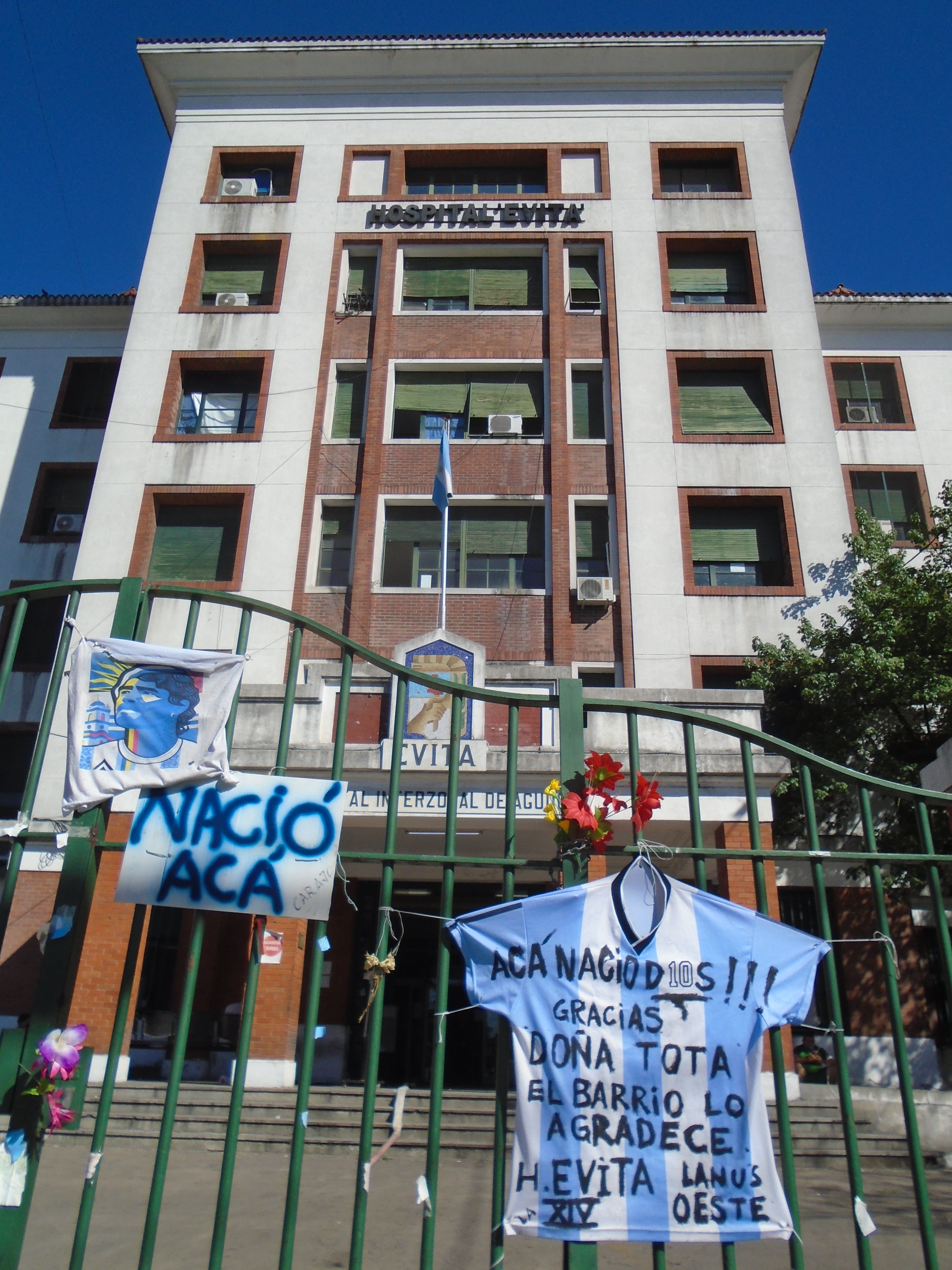
Hospital Evita in Lanús, where Diego Maradona was born

Efforts to gain autonomy for the district date back many years. The goal was eventually achieved with the emergence of the "Unión Vecinal Autonomista," whose members used the number 111 as their symbol and campaigned to achieve the long-awaited autonomy.

The Partido de Lanús officially became independent on January 1, 1945, bearing the number 111 among the districts of the Buenos Aires province, as decreed on September 29, 1944. Juan Ramón Piñeiro was appointed as the municipal commissioner. With this, Lanús separated from the Partido de Avellaneda, which it had been part of until then under the name "4 de junio."

On June 13, 1945, a decree expanded its jurisdiction with the annexation of Remedios de Escalada, known for its railway workshops and previously belonging to the Partido de Lomas de Zamora.

On October 19, 1955, the dictatorship self-styled as the "Revolución Libertadora" changed the name "4 de junio" to "Lanús," a name that remains in use today.

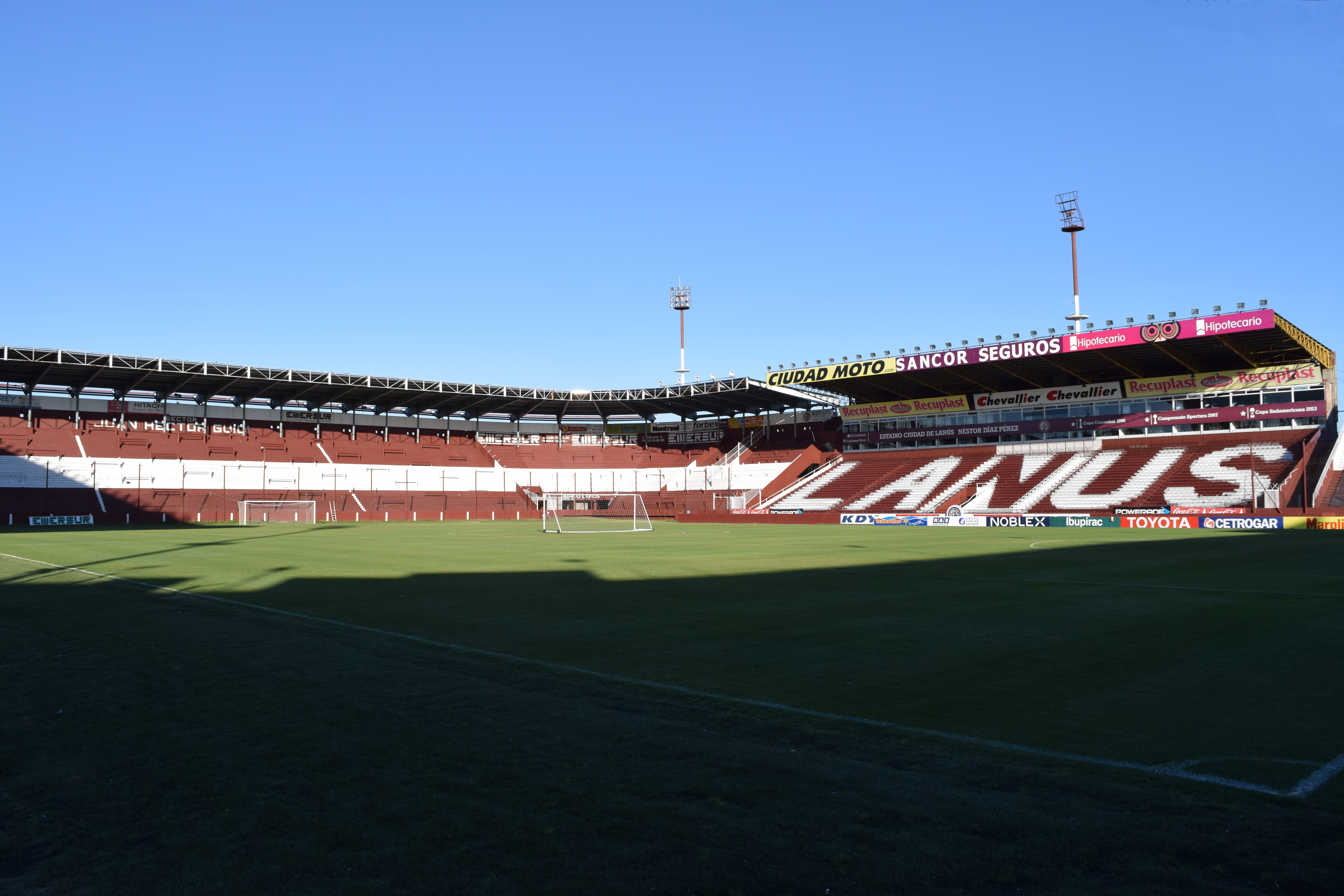
Ciudad de Lanús Stadium of Club Atlético Lanús

The first local newspaper was "La Comuna," founded in 1910. The Juan Bautista Alberdi library was established nine years later and currently houses 22,000 volumes. The municipal library, founded in 1949, holds 11,000 copies of books and magazines.

In November 1986, the "Plazoleta Héroes de Malvinas" was inaugurated in Gerli, featuring an airplane and a cannon facing the Malvinas Islands, in tribute to those who died during the war.

Lanús is also home to the prominent "Hospital Interzonal General de Agudos Evita," founded on August 30, 1952, where patients from other suburbs are treated. Additionally, there are the private clinics Modelo and Estrada, both equipped for high-complexity care.

Since the restoration of democracy in 1983, Manuel Quindimil served as the mayor. He had previously held the position during the 1973–1976 period. Quindimil's long tenure as mayor ended in the elections of October 28, 2007, when he lost to Darío Díaz Pérez of the Frente para la Victoria. Currently, Néstor Grindetti serves as the mayor of the district.

== Notable people associated with Lanús ==
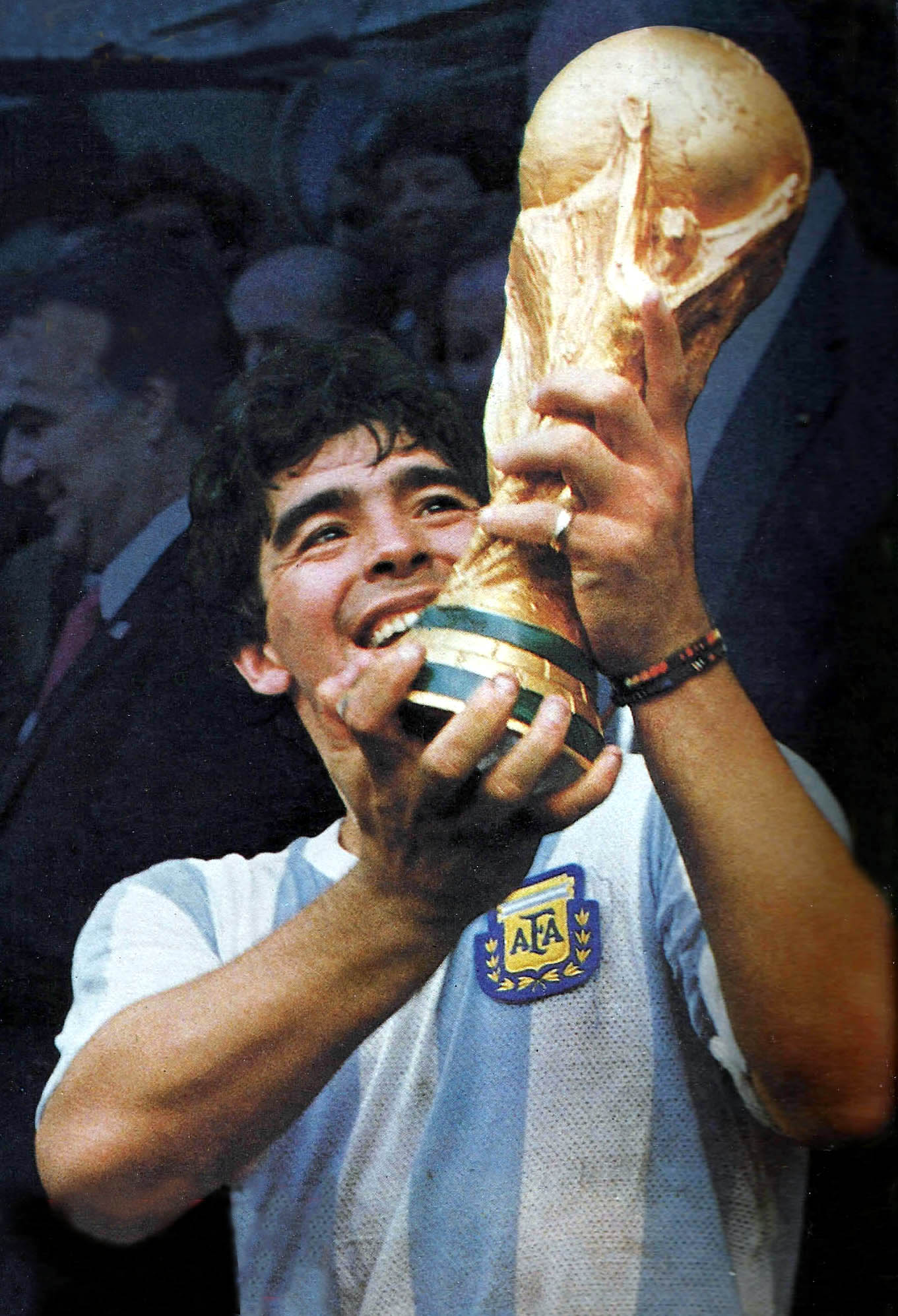
Diego Maradona celebrating after winning the 1986 FIFA World Cup

- Horacio Accavallo – boxer
- Luca Andrada – professional footballer
- Hugo Arana – actor
- Alfredo Arias – theatre producer
- Gustavo Cordera – rock musician
- Maximiliano Djerfy – rock musician
- Yael Falcón – FIFA football referee
- Diego Maradona – football legend, star of the 1986 World Cup
- Ricardo Montaner – famous Latin musician
- Sandro – popular crooner
- Babasónicos – rock band
- Gastón Fernández – football player for Portland Timbers
- Diego Valeri – football player for Club Atlético Lanús, all-time top scorer for Portland Timbers
- Walter Montillo – football player for Shandong Luneng
- Adrian Ricchiuti – football player for Calcio Catania
- Marcela Morelo – Latin singer and composer
- Julie Gonzalo – actress
- Francisco Álvarez – actor
- Ariel González – rock musician, songwriter and arranger
- Sergio Olguín – writer, journalist and editor; wrote a novel, Lanús.
- Emanuel Moriatis – racing driver
- Emiliano Spataro – racing driver
