= Villa Celina =

City in Buenos Aires Province, Argentina

Coordinates: 34°42′04.9″S 58°28′50.4″W

Ciudad Celina (formerly Villa Celina) is a city in La Matanza Partido, in the Buenos Aires Province of Argentina. It is bordered to the north by Avenida General Paz, to the west by Ricchieri Freeway, to the south by Mercado Central de Buenos Aires, and to the east by the banks of the Riachuelo River.

The city is noted for being the founding place of rock band Callejeros, whose members, including lead vocalist Patricio Fontanet and drummer Eduardo Vázquez began meeting to rehearse in 1995.
