= Lhasa Donggar Wholesale Market =

Market in Lhasa, Tibet, China

Coordinates: 29.65567°N 90.9842°E

Lhasa Donggar Wholesale Market, or Lhasa Donggar Agricultural Products Wholesale Market (Chinese: 拉萨东嘎农产品批发市场), is a large-scale agricultural products wholesale market in Lhasa, Tibet Autonomous Region of China, located in Sangmu Village, Donggar Subdistrict, Doilungdêqên, Lhasa, and is one of the large-scale agricultural products wholesale markets at the national level in the People's Republic of China.

== Management ==
The wholesale market was built in 2007 and put into use in the same year. The wholesale market is a leading enterprise in the wholesale of agricultural products in the Tibet Autonomous Region.

The market comprises 12 specialized zones, including fresh produce, frozen goods, Tibetan medicinal herbs, and regional specialties like yak meat and highland barley. Facilities include 3,200 temperature-controlled stalls, a 6,000 m² cold storage (−25°C capacity), and a 24/7 pesticide residue lab testing 400+ samples monthly. Since 2018, it has integrated blockchain-based supply chain tracking for yak dairy products.

Notable for its high-altitude logistics, the market sources vegetables from Sichuan and Yunnan via the Qinghai-Tibet Highway, utilizing oxygen-controlled trucks to preserve freshness. It supplies 80% of Lhasa's hotels and schools, with annual transactions surpassing ¥9 billion (2023 data).
