= La Empoderada Orquesta Atípica =

Argentine all-women tango orchestra

La Empoderada Orquesta Atípica is an Argentine all-women tango orchestra. It was founded by its current director, a violinist Pamela Victoriano, in 2018 and has 27 members. The orchestra is based in Buenos Aires.

Victoriano organized in January 2018 a WhatsApp group with 75 women musician members whose goal was to increase the representation of women in Argentine music and to overcome the machist attitude in tango. In March they had the first personal meeting in Buenos Aires. Eventually, five musical groups originated from this initiative, of which in 2021 three were still active — La Empoderada Orquesta Atípica, jazz orchestra Sister Said, and the folk group La Suculenta. La Empoderada Orquesta Atípica first played in public in August 2018.

The size of the orchestra is much bigger than the usual size of an orchestra playing Argentine tango, and the classical tango compositions have to be rearranged for the orchestra.
