= Xavier Moyano =

Argentine musician (born 1981)

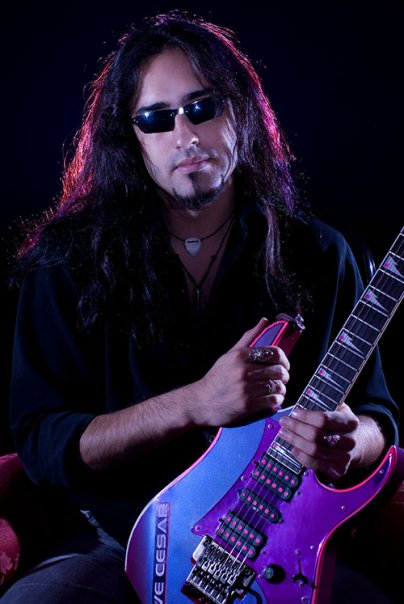

Background information
- Born: 2 December 1981 (age 44); San Miguel de Tucumán, Tucumán, Argentina
- Genres: Hard rock, heavy metal, rock, blues, acoustic, electronica, reggae, pop, funk, bossa, and others
- Occupations: Rock instrumentalist, musician, producer, teacher
- Instruments: Electric Guitars, Acoustic Guitar, vocals, keyboards, bass
- Years active: 1999-present

Xavier Moyano (born December 2, 1981) is an Argentine musician; producer, performer, composer, and educator. He began his career as a session guitarist in Tucuman in 1999. By 2003 was the guitarist for rock/pop band "AVe Cesar" until 2008, after that he became a solo rock instrumentalist. Between 2009 and 2011 he was guitarist and composer of metal band "Seliger" (Argentina/Brasil), between 2014 and 2019 he was guitarist and producer of "Cossas Novas" (Bossa / Fusion and Latin-Jazz), since 2018 he is guitarist and co-producer of "Rock Bro's" (ClassicRock). He is currently a solo guitarist, session musician and producer.

Xavier has taken his Art to more than a hundred cities in ten countries, and gives Workshops about Music, Improvisation, Musical Fusion, Cultural Management; guitar clinics and classes at conservatories, universities, academies, institutes, and schools of music in South America.

== Notable performances ==
He's performed with Pablo Soler (Buenos Aires) on several occasions, and in 2009 he performed with Carina Alfie (Buenos Aires) in the NOA (Tucuman, Salta and Santiago). He's been part of several South American Guitar Masters tours in 2004, 2006 and 2007 along with Marcos DeRos (Brazil), and participated in the S3 Ibero American Guitar Fest in 2008 with Manuel Seoane (Spain). Xavier also performed in the Guitar Fest Buenos Aires '09 along with eleven other guitarists from Colombia, Korea, and Argentina.

Xavier was the guitarist and producer of rock/pop band AVe Cesar (2003–2008) with whom he participated in the Cosquin Rock and Tucuman Rock Festival, sharing the stage with Bersuit, Los Piojos, Luis Alberto Spinetta, León Gieco, Intoxicados, Kapanga, Carajo, Viticus, NoTeVaGustar (Uruguay), and many others. He then played in the NOA with La Renga in three cities (Tucuman, Catamarca and Salta), and then opened for the British band Motörhead in Córdoba.

In March 2006, Xavier He celebrated 100 scenarios, was part of the huge SAGM music celebration with Marcos DeRos (Brazil) & Pablo Soler (Buenos Aires). The celebration ended with Moyano and many other musicians jamming on stage together, performing the song "Rockin' in the Free World".

In September 2009 he was invited by the University of Tucuman Symphony Orchestra to participate in the Concierto Pop de Primavera with music from movies, there were four shows at Teatro Alberdi and one in Concepción. In November 2009 he participated in "Adagio", a Lyric/Musical show of the Symphony Orchestra's baritone, performing The Phantom of the Opera, "Music ", "Adaggio" and Roxanne tango version of the movie Moulin Rouge .

In December 2009 plays in "Seliger" Metal band, in Buenos Aires, Argentina opening show for "ANGRA" (Brasil).

In October 2010 XM with Seliger performed with Sonata Arctica (Finland) in Buenos Aires Argentina, and play in Rosario (Santa Fé, Arg); Montevideo, Uruguay; and in December he shared the stage with Gilby Clarke (ex- Guns N' Roses) in La Paz, Bo.

In 2011 play with Seliger in Buenos Aires, Argentina (Teatro Flores) he shared the stage with Blind Guardian (Germany).

In 2012 South America Guitar Tour in Argentina, Bolivia, Chile and Perú. play with Bluecifer (Chile) in Lima, Peru in C.C. Real Plaza, They opened the show of the legendary Swedish band "Europe"; In 2013 play in La Paz (Bolivia), Iquique (Chile), Mendoza and Tucuman (Argentina).

In 2014 he recorded the album "Versions", with "Cossas Novas" in Chile; classic hits work in versions Bossa, Fusion and Latin-Rock. They made a tour South America, visiting different cities in Chile, Bolivia and Argentina. In 2015 they toured the Pacific Coasts (Chile / Peru / Ecuador), with shows and performances in restaurants, pubs, hotels, and other various events. In 2016, play in July in Sanchez Aguilar Theater in Guayaquil, Ecuador, with "Latinoamericanto" (Latin American Music Show) with "Arpa de América" group; in October play in "Feria de Guayaquil" (Ecuador) and Colombia (Eje Cafetero, Medellin, Santa Fé de Antioquia and Cartagena de Indias. In 2017 play in: Colombia & Venezuela. Tour "Caribeña Amazónica Andina" in Venezuela (Maracaibo, Maracay, Mérida and Caracas), Brasil (Boa Vista, Manaus, Porto Velho), Bolivia (Trinidad, Santa Cruz de la Sierra, Cochabamba, La Paz) and Argentina (Jujuy, Salta, Tucuman). In 2018 play in: Argentina (with The Delirants, RockBros and Cossas Novas), Bolivia (with Los Delirantes and Cossas Novas) and Chile (with Cossas Novas and Los Delirantes).

In 2019 it was presented at the "8° International Guitar Festival en la ciudad blanca" in Sucre, along with guitarists from Bolivia, Chile, Mexico and Japan. In that same city it was invited as guitarist of the Sucre Big Band to its official premiere at the Gran Mariscal Theater; He also appears at the FIC 2019 (Festival Internacional de Cultura) as an artist and teacher, and at the International Jazz Festival from Tucumán; toured more than 10 cities in 4 countries with shows and workshops, sharing a Message of Union through Music and Art.

In 2020 he was part of the international cycle of Streaming Shows "Live From Home" (as an artist, coordination and production), in which artists from 20 countries performed. Participated in the Musical September 2020 at the San Martin Theater in Tucumán (Argentina). In December 2020, he was the general producer of the "Mega Guitar Festival", gathering 36 Guitarists from 17 countries, transmitting a message of union.

In 2021 with "Rock Bro's" (South American band where he is guitarist, musical director and producer) they publish a video of a live show with classic Rock hits; Recorded in Tucumán (Arg) and produced in Argentina and the United States.

This year marks 25 years since he started with the guitar and celebrates it by recording a tribute album to Charly Garcia along with guest artists where they play hits throughout his career.

== On tour ==
Xavier has taken his Art to more than a hundred cities in ten countries in (Argentina, Bolivia, Chile, Peru, Ecuador, Colombia, Venezuela, Brazil, Paraguay and Uruguay).

Starting the tours in 2000; of the most important shows were at the "Cosquin Rock" Festival in Córdoba (2004), and an opening show of the mitic band "Motörhead" also on Cba (Arg); later as a soloist, different shows in the Northwest of Argentina.

X. M. Rock Instrumental Show went on the road to Bolivia in 2007 where he performed many concerts and gave guitar clinics in the cities of Cochabamba, La Paz and Tarija. He ended the tour in Tartagal and Salta, Argentina. In 2008 he again toured, playing live and giving guitar clinics in various countries and cities. Argentina: Tucuman, Salta, Cafayate, Santiago del Estero, Jujuy, Buenos Aires, La Plata, Formosa. Paraguay: Asunción. Bolivia: La Paz, Cochabamba, Sucre, Potosí, Santa Cruz, Oruro, and Tarija.

In December 2009, Moyano made his debut with the band Seliger from Buenos Aires. They performed in El Teatro Flores with Angra (Brazil), with Shaman's singer Thiago Bianchi (Brazil) and guest Elodia Agostini (Italy). Seliger is currently preparing its first album which will feature international guests Kupainen Matias (Stratovarius), Rafael Bittencourt (Angra), and many others.

In 2010, Moyano played the cities of Tucuman, Formosa, Chaco, Lules, Tartagal, Catamarca, Salta, La Plata, Santa Fé, and Buenos Aires in Argentina. He also toured Bolivia extensively and played in the cities of Santa Cruz, Cochabamba, Sucre, La Paz, Montero, Potosi, Yotala, Oruro, El Alto, Atocha, Villazon, and Copacabana. Xavier also had the opportunity to perform with Seliger in Montevideo Uruguay, and as soloist also crossed into Peru to play in the cities of Puno and Cusco. He ended the year with a performance in his home town of Tucuman Argentina.

In 2011 he has had presentations in: Tucuman: SMdeTucuman, San Pedro, Monteros; Campo Quijano, Salta, guest of Gauchos de Acero in: "Lucha Criolla" and "Smoke on the Water" (Deep Purple); In June, a South American tour: Chile: Antofagasta and Iquique; Bolivia: Cochabamba, Oruro and La Paz; Peru: Puno and Arequipa and returns to Argentina; This year his music went to Spain to be part of the presentation of the video series of extreme sports Free Style HD "We Are Family", produced by Boston Enjoy Productions in Barcelona. Xavier other work, is recording and editing audio & video.

between December 2013 and June 2014 recorded the album "Cossas Novas" in Iquique, Chile. In 2014 they made a tour in South America, in different cities of Chile, Bolivia and Argentina; In 2015: "Cossas Novas" South American Pacific Coasts Tour (Chile / Peru / Ecuador), with live shows in restaurants, pubs, hotels and events in general. 2016: Play in Ecuador, Peru, Chile, Bolivia, Argentina and Colombia. 2017: Shows and Workshops in: Colombia, Venezuela, Brasil, Bolivia and Argentina. 2018: Shows and Workshops about Guitars and music, Improvisation, Music Fusion, Cultural Management in: Argentina, Bolivia and Chile.

In 2019 toured more than 10 cities in 4 countries with shows and workshops, sharing a Message of Union through Music and Art.

== Inspiration ==
Xavier's instrumental music has frequently incorporated themes of peace and social awareness. He has participated in benefit concerts supporting causes related to human rights, animal rights, and opposition to violence, discrimination and racism.

== Endorsements ==
Xavier Moyano is endorsed by Wenstone Amps, DS Pickups, MST Pedals, Kikemol Straps and Raúl Varela Luthier.

== Influences ==
Steve Vai, Joe Satriani, Slash, Zakk Wylde, Carlos Santana, Jimi Hendrix, Andy Timmons, Paul Gilbert, Richie Kotzen, and Pablo Soler

== Gear ==
=== Electric guitars ===
- Ibanez RG 350DX - white
- Parker MaxxFly PDF44V Gold
- Epiphone Les Paul Standard (Korea)
- B.C.Rich Warlock Revenge -black-
- S.G. (Set-In) wine sunburst (red to black), flame top
- Stratocaster SX Vintage Series (maple) (red sunburst)
- Telecaster 1970 (Semi Hollow) Fabrison (Arg)
- Strat (left handed) (rosewood) (vintage blue)
- Transparent Acrylic Electric Guitar

in the past:

- Ibanez RG 550 Ltd purple neon (Japan'90) (2001–2010)
- Ibanez EX 350 with DiMarzio pickups (USA) (2000–2018)
- Fender Stratocaster Standard Mexico (90's) (2000–2003)
- Yamaha Pacifica 1221M (Japan) (2002–2010)
- Yamaha SG-1500 black (Japan'78) (2000–2013)

=== Acoustic guitar ===
- Travel Guitar Cobra T36 (Raul Varela Luthier) design by XM & RVL
- Ibanez Talman Acoustic Series
- Cuatro Venezolano de Luthier (Maracaibo, Venezuela)
- Jasmine by Takamine 12 strings (steel) (2004–2009)
- Yamaha Classic with nylon strings (Japan) (1999–2007)
- Classic Guitar Segovia E170cn w/cutaway (nylon strings)

=== Amplifiers ===
- Wenstone GE-1600H + 1960A 4x12" (Argentina)
- Marshall Valvestate Head VS-100 RH (UK)
- Marshall 412B cabinet with Celestion (UK)
- Peavey ValveKing VK112 combo (in LaPaz, Bolivia)
- Wenstone BE3000H Cabezal + 1x15" EV (Argentina)
- Samson Expedition Express 360

=== Effects ===
- Line6 Floor POD
- DigiTech Whammy II
- WahWah Jim Dunlop CryBaby GCB-95
- Roland VG-99 V-Guitar System (Made in Japan)
- BOSS FS-5U (Footswitch Controller)
- NUX Loop Core (Looper Pedal)
- BOSS OC-3 (Super Octave, polyphonic octave)
- MST (Bolivia) "LaRataVieja" custom
- ZOOM 707II (GuitarFX: MultiEffects)
- Behringer V-AMP 2 (2006–2010)
- ART SGX-2000 (valve rack) (2005–2007)

=== Pickups ===
- DS Pickups (Argentina)
- DiMarzio Pickups (Made in USA)
- Roland GK-3 (Divided Pickup MIDI)

=== Straps ===
- DiMarzio (USA)
- Antitodo (Arg)

=== Strings ===
- Ernie Ball .09 (USA)
- Ernie Ball 2233 (Ac12)
- Magma .095 (Argentina)

=== Bags/cases ===
- Proel & RockBag by Warwick

=== Cords ===
- Planet Waves (D'Addario) & Ernie Ball
- PlanetWaves 10 ft (3M) Instrument Cable (mono) PW-AG-10
- PlanetWaves 20 ft (6M) Instrument Cable (mono) PW-AG-20 L

=== Picks ===
- 0.69 mmm
- 1.5 mm
- 2 mm

== Discography & Music Works (LP's, EP's, singles, videos, and participations) ==
=== 2001, 2002 & 2003 ===
- Judas – "Jerusalem" (heavy metal, trash) EP
- Xavier Moyano (instrumental) single
- Argón - entre penumbras (heavy metal) (s)
- Triunfal (power metal clásico) EP
- Templarium (power metal progresivo) EP
- Adrian Llovera – "Cuadros" (canciones, disco)
- AVe Cesar : "Rompeparedes" (hard rock) EP

=== 2004 & 2005 ===
- Reino Infame - "Cae El Sol" (rock, ska, punk) EP
- Ave Cesar – "Revolucion de Rock & Roll" (disco)
- R I S K – Project (heavy metal, rock, trash) EP
- KaDaNeK demo (power metal) single
- KRÜCK – "2005" demo (rock) EP
- G.X.Project (hard rock, soul, pop, baladas) EP
- AVe Cesar - "La Otra Parte De Mi" (rock) (s)
- Adrian Llovera – "Bajo La Lluvia" (rock) EP
- Malas Noticias – "Nunca Voy A Madurar" (punk rock) (s)

=== 2006 ===
- Initial Gravity (metal progresivo instrumental) EP
- Harder – "Project" (hard rock) EP
- AVe Cesar – "Nueva Dimensión" (rock, pop) EP
- Xavier Moyano (Rock Instrumental) EP
- Linaje – "Lágrimas De Sangre" (pop, rock) single
- Furtivo – "Engranajes De Papel" (rock, punk) (s)
- Adrian Llovera – "Rojo Oscuro" (disco, rock) LP
- VITAL : "Personalidad" (disco, hard core–ñümetal) LP
- AVe Cesar – "New Dimension Rock Show" (AdelantoDVD)

=== 2007 & 2008 ===
- AVe Cesar – "New Dimension Rock Show" (DVD live)
- Ronald Villegas: "Primeros Pasos" – Sucre, Bolivia - EP&Video
- XM Rock Instrumental Bolivia Band : Kojudo Mosh (Rock, Metal)

=== 2009 ===
- Orquesta Sinfónica UNT – "Concierto Pop" – (Vivo) – CD
- Adagio – "Espectáculo Lírico Musical" – (vivo)

=== 2010 ===
- Seliger – Out Of The Dark (s) (metal)
- Ël Último Cocalero – La Paz, Bolivia (rock)

=== 2011 ===
- Xavier Moyano - Espejismos - instrumental (s)
- DemianFanzine (La Rioja, Arg) (compilado)
- SELIGER ( Argentina | Brazil ) (EP - metal)

=== 2012 ===
- Helen Fuentes - "Sentirte" - Bolivia
- El Show del fin del Mundo - DVD - ART

=== 2013 ===
- "The Phantom of The Opera" - instrumental version · audio & video

=== 2014 ===
- "Cossas Novas" : Bossa / Fusion / Latin-Jazz (Argentina/Chile)

=== 2015 & 2016 ===
- Chicos del Parque: Festejoo (s) Malambo/Fusion (Ecuador)
- Nuestro Juramento (Bossa/Bolero) junto a El Arpa de América
- Latinoamericanto en vivo Teatro S. A. (Guayaquil, Ecuador)

=== 2017 ===
- Tocate el corazón (s) : Los Delirantes (Arg+Bol) & Radio Soledad (Guatemala)
- Los Delirantes & Amigos : (Live Session in Caracas, Venezuela)

=== 2018 ===
- Los Delirantes La Paz Ensamble (Live 2018 LP, Bo)
- RockBro's & Friends Live 2018 (Tucumán, Argentina)

=== 2019 ===
- Rock Bro's : ClassicRock : Live 2019 (Tucuman, Argentina)
- Sucre Big Band (F.I.C.: Live in Gran Mariscal Theater)

=== 2020 ===
- Leo Villagra : "Rapsodia del quebracho" (LP)
- Ronald Villegas : "Mirame" (s)

=== 2021 ===
- Canciones de Charly Vol.1 (LP): Homenaje a Charly García 2021 junto a artistas invitados
