= Valentín Alsina, Buenos Aires =

Valentín Alsina
- City
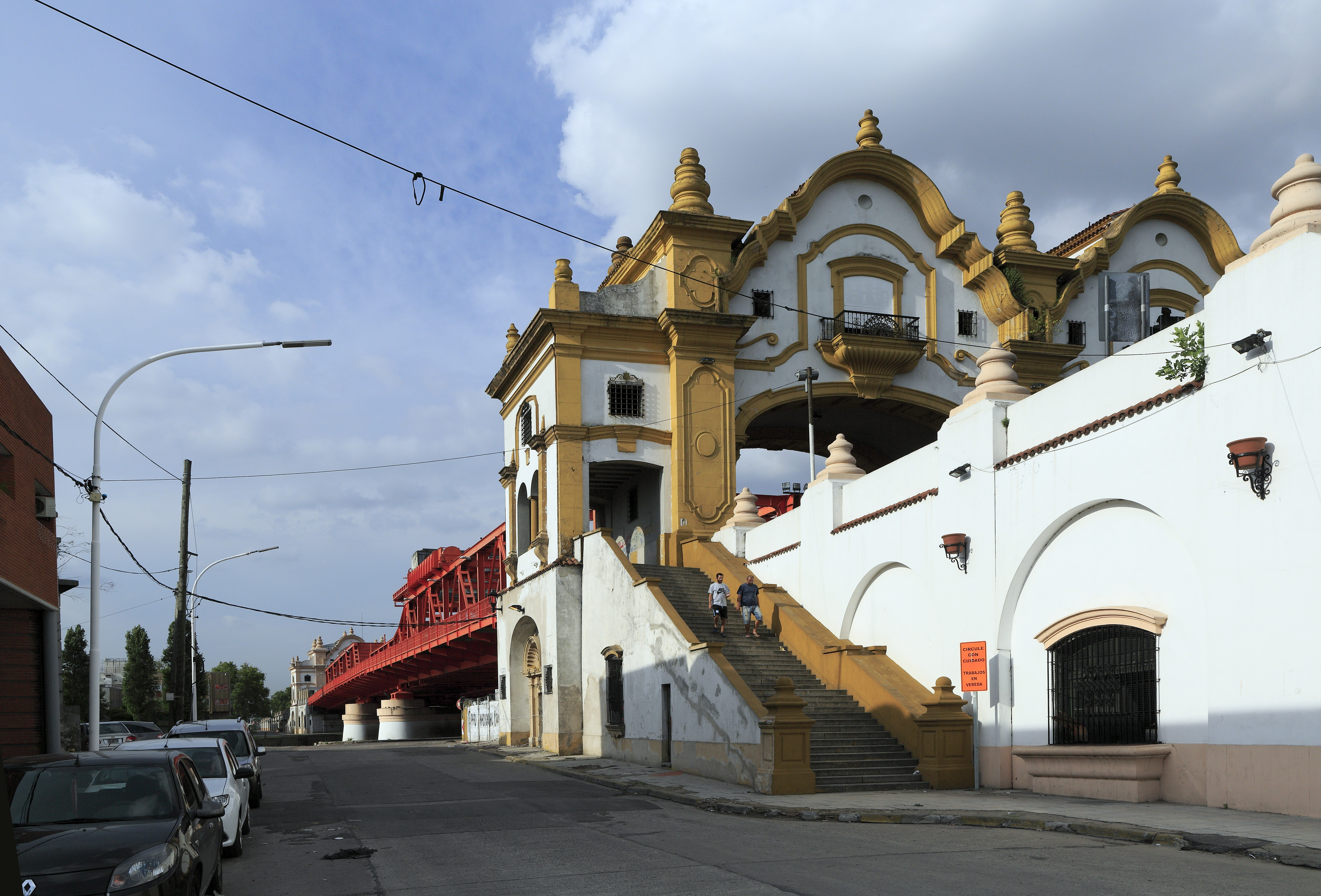

- Location in Greater Buenos Aires
- Coordinates: 34°40′S 58°25′W
- Country: Argentina
- Province: Buenos Aires
- Partido: Lanús
- Founded: 1874
- Elevation: 7 m (23 ft)

Population (2001 census [INDEC])
  - Total: 41,155
- CPA Base: B 1822
- Area code: +54 11

Valentín Alsina is a city in the Lanús Partido of Buenos Aires Province, Argentina. It is located next to Buenos Aires city in the Gran Buenos Aires urban area.

== History ==
The city was named after Valentín Alsina (1802–1869), two-time Governor of the independent State of Buenos Aires. It is considered one of the historical 'cien barrios porteños,' one of the 100 'barrios' of the city.

== Notable residents ==
- Jorge Carrascosa (born 1948), former footballer
- Maximiliano Djerfy (1974–2021), musician, singer-songwriter
- Gustavo Adrián López (born 1973), footballer
- Mabel Manzotti (1938–2012), film, stage, and television actress
- Ricardo Montaner (born 1957), singer and songwriter
- Edmundo Rivero (1911–1986), tango singer and composer
- Miguel Ángel Russo (1956–2025), football player and manager
- Sandro (1945–2010), singer and actor

== Twin towns and sister cities ==
- Naples, Italy
- Nouméa, New Caledonia
- Caracas, Venezuela
- Vilnius, Lithuania
- Polla, Italy
