= Cromañón nightclub fire =

2004 fire in Buenos Aires, Argentina

Cromañón nightclub fire tragedy
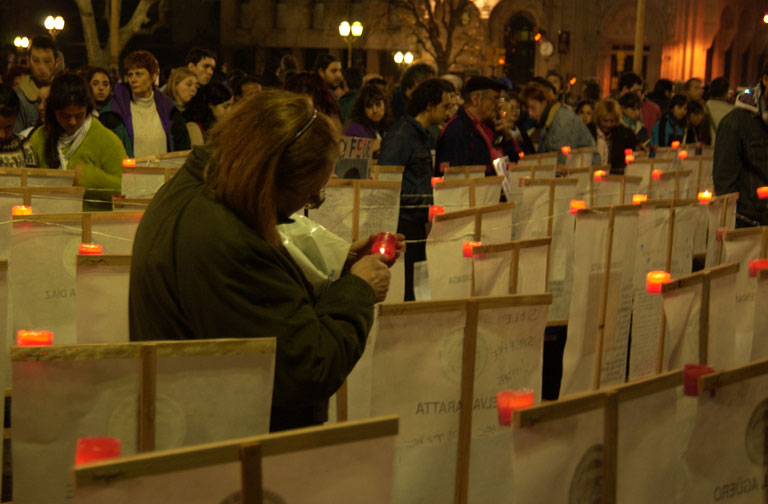
- Relatives of the deceased in the fire light candles in a public protest against the perceived lack of control by the government
- Date: 30 December 2004
- Time: 22:40 (UTC-3)
- Venue: República Cromañón nightclub
- Location: Buenos Aires, Argentina; 34°36′33″S 58°24′35″W
- Type: Fire
- Cause: Indoor fireworks fire
- Deaths: 194
- Injuries: 1,492+

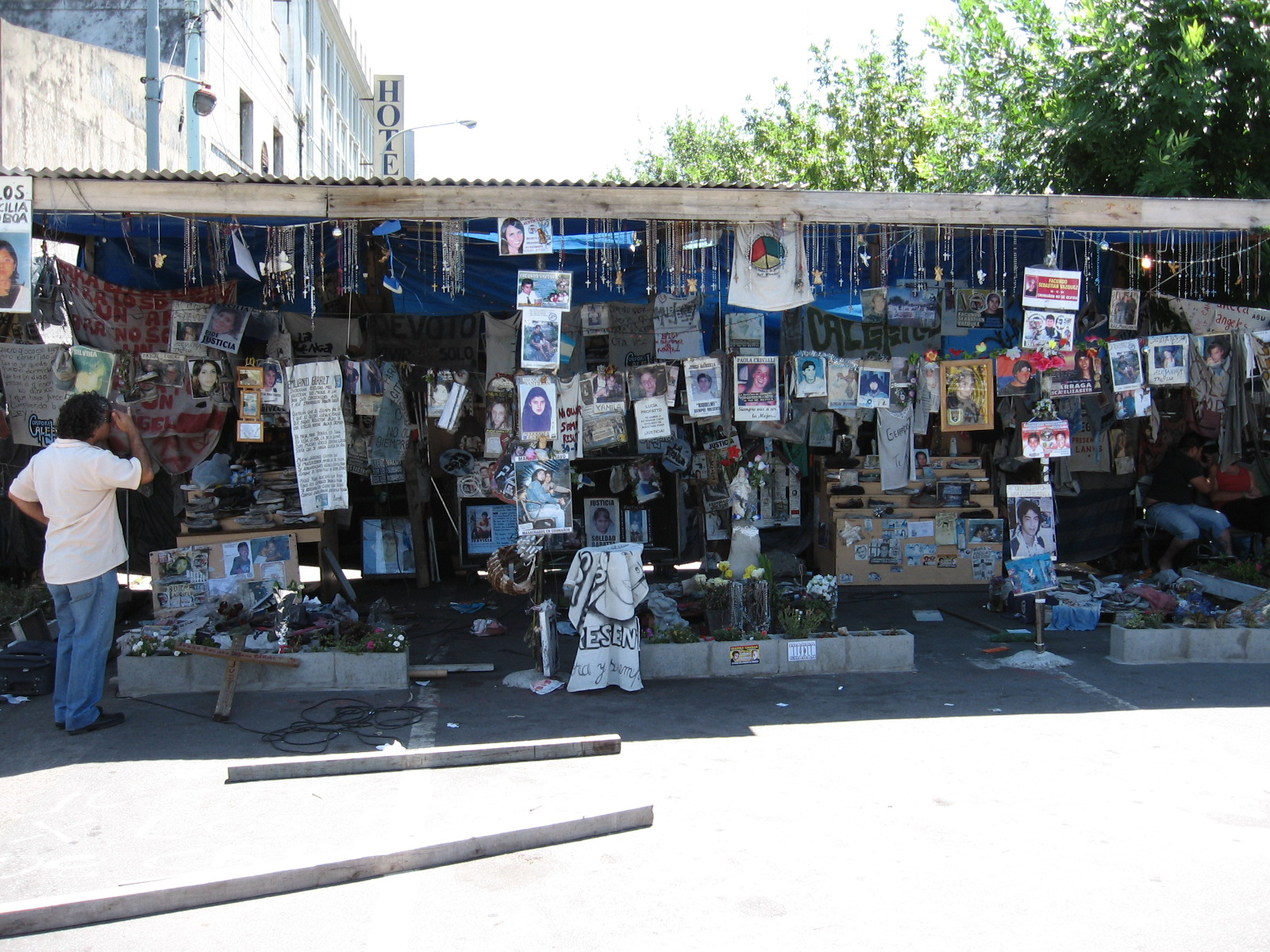
Makeshift memorial for the dead

On 30 December 2004, a fire broke out in the crowded República Cromañón nightclub in Buenos Aires, Argentina, killing 194 people and leaving at least 1,492 injured. The direct cause was the indoor pyrotechnics igniting the ceiling.

== The nightclub ==
República Cromañón (Cro-Magnon Republic) was a venue that held concerts and events, on 3060-3066-3070 Bartolomé Mitre street in the Balvanera neighbourhood of Buenos Aires. It was operated by entertainment entrepreneur Omar Chabán, and opened on 12 April 2004 with a concert by the band Callejeros, the same band that played on the night of the fire.

The club was in a two-story building, with a main entrance with six doors behind it leading into the main area of the nightclub. On the night of the fire, four of the six doors were locked. There was also a connection to a nearby hotel, an emergency exit that was locked, and another emergency exit that was blocked by a fence in front of the stage. There were hardly any fire safety measures, with no reports of a fire detection or alarm system, emergency lighting, or fire suppression equipment; ten of the fifteen fire extinguishers were unusable, with no pressure. The nightclub's fire safety license had run out the month before the fire.

== Fire ==
The venue was hosting rock group Callejeros, with an audience of around 4,000 people, almost three times the venue's capacity of 1,500. The fire began at the beginning of the show, when the Callejeros were playing the opening song "Distinto". An attendee set off a pyrotechnic flare, a popular device in New Year's Eve celebrations, which ignited foam in the ceiling. The fireworks accident quickly spread as the materials used in the building for decoration were flammable: mostly wood, styrofoam, acoustic panels and a shade sail made of polyester fibre. The net was hung from the ceiling and caught fire first, melting into a rain of fire. In some parts of the building, teddy bear stuffing was used as a cheap alternative to wool fiber. The owner and the band's lead singer had told the patrons not to use flares inside the building.

Four of the six doors, some of which were fire exits, were chained shut so that "people would not enter without paying", according to Chief of Government Aníbal Ibarra. All the victims died from inhaling poisonous gases and carbon monoxide. After the fire the technical institution INTI found that, due to the materials and volume of the building, the concentration of cyanide in the air would have been about 225 ppm, sufficient to cause death within minutes of inhalation. Many of the victims were identified to be in their teens and 20s, but rescue workers clearing the club also found children and babies. Survivors reported that a bathroom in the nightclub had been used as a nursery, where parents could leave their children while watching the show.

== Aftermath ==
Following the disaster, an Argentine judge issued a national and international arrest order against Omar Chabán, local businessman and owner of República Cromañón and other nightclubs, including one called Cemento that had been closed by court orders many times before. Chabán was arrested at one of his houses in the neighbourhood of Montserrat.

President Néstor Kirchner decreed three days of national mourning, and city authorities forbade concerts and closed all nightclubs in Buenos Aires during the mourning period, only to open again, one by one, after they had been checked and approved by the fire department. Pope John Paul II expressed his condolences to victims families in a message sent to officials in Argentine churches.

=== Tributes ===
The parents and relatives of many of the victims have worked to keep the victims' memories alive, by planting 194 trees in honor of the deceased, and creating a traveling exhibition of the victims' photographs. A ceramics factory donated memorial plaques to be dispersed across the country.

=== Series ===
In November 2024, Amazon Prime Video released Cromañón: The Night of the Fire, an eight-episode Argentine drama series inspired by the 2004 nightclub fire. The series follows a group of young people before the tragedy and examines its aftermath, including the psychological impact on survivors and the beginning of the criminal trial in 2008.

== Investigation ==
It later became known that República Cromañón had been overdue for a fire hazard inspection since late November 2004. Although Buenos Aires Mayor Aníbal Ibarra blamed the Fire Department of the Argentine Federal Police (responsible for the inspections), several flaws in the city's inspection system soon surfaced. In addition to the city's poor planning for a disaster of this magnitude, critics pointed to Ibarra for failing to reorganize Buenos Aires' inspection system. A few days after the fire, Ibarra reshuffled the entire Buenos Aires security and emergency administration. The City Legislature announced that Ibarra was going to face a questioning session, but failed to achieve the necessary votes to force his questioning. Shortly thereafter, Ibarra voluntarily submitted to a questioning session, and announced a recall referendum to decide whether he would remain in office or not.

Relatives and friends of the dead organized several marches to Plaza de Mayo demanding the resignation of Ibarra as mayor, the conviction of Omar Chabán, and a more efficient inspection system. Some of these marches ended with incidents between protesters and the police.

On 14 November 2005, an impeachment jury formed by the Buenos Aires Legislature suspended Ibarra for four months, pending an investigation of his performance that could lead to his removal. He accused the opposition of manipulating the families of República Cromañón's victims in order to ruin his career. On 7 March 2006, after four months of deliberations, the impeachment jury voted to remove Ibarra from office.

== Trial ==
A trial started on 19 August 2008 and lasted a year. The judges heard from over 300 witnesses, who said that young fans had lit a flare that struck the ceiling. It was revealed that the band was in charge of the concert's organization, security and entry into the club that night. It was deemed that the band was not at fault for the club being given a permit although it lacked basic fire safety measures such as fire extinguishers, working emergency exits and nonflammable walls and ceilings.

The victims' families were represented by several legal teams during the criminal proceedings. Among the principal lawyers representing the complainants were José Iglesias, Marcelo Parrilli, Mauricio Castro and Patricio Poplavsky. During the 2008 trial, Poplavsky argued for convictions on charges of intentional homicide with eventual intent. He subsequently represented 222 relatives of victims, including those killed and injured, during the second trial.

The defendants were sentenced as follows:

- Omar Chabán: 20-year prison sentence
- Raúl Villarreal: 1-year suspended prison sentence
- Members of Callejeros: Acquitted, then retried in 2011: 11-year prison sentence (reduced to 7 years in 2012 for Patricio Fontanet, 6 years for Eduardo Vázquez, and 5 years for Maximiliano Djerfy)
- Diego Argañaraz (manager of Callejeros): 18-year prison sentence
- Fabiana Fiszbin (ex Control secretary): 2-year prison sentence
- Ana María Fernández (ex Buenos Aires government servant): 2-year prison sentence
- Subcommissioner Carlos Díaz: 18-year prison sentence
- Commissioner Miguel Belay: acquitted

The band members of Callejeros were acquitted in the 2009 trial, but the 2011 appeals court ruled that they shared responsibility for the fire: witnesses said that the band had encouraged the audience to fire flares. One of Callejeros' members, Eduardo Vázquez, was separately sentenced to life in prison for the murder of his wife Wanda Taddei in February 2010.

== See also ==
- Kiss nightclub fire – A similar fire in Brazil caused by pyrotechnics.
- 2026 Crans-Montana bar fire – A similar fire in Switzerland caused by pyrotechnics.
- List of nightclub fires
- List of fireworks accidents and incidents
