= Omar Chabán =

Argentine nightclub owner

Emir Omar Chabán (31 March 1952 – 17 November 2014) was an Argentine impresario, who was sentenced to twenty years' imprisonment for a fatal fire in one of his businesses. He remained free on appeal, during which time he died.

Born in San Martín, Buenos Aires, Chabán became one of the major figures in the Buenos Aires underground scene during the 1980s as owner of Café Einstein and later Cemento, which became a major venue for alternative rock concerts, theater acts, and dance parties.

On 30 December 2004, a fire killed 194 and injured over 600 in República Cromañón, a concert venue that Chabán rented and operated. He was indicted as responsible; the musical act on that evening, Callejeros, had encouraged spectators to light sparklers in the concert hall, even though the ceiling included flammable materials, and once the fire started, fire exits were padlocked and did not open, trapping the people inside fatally. Chabán escaped capture for some time, and then surrendered. After spending some time behind bars, the judge allowed him to post bail. After relatives of the victims protested in front of his mother's house in San Martín, Chabán moved to a secluded location on the Paraná delta area.

Trials of various people connected with the fire, including Chabán, commenced in August 2008. On 19 August 2009, Chaban was sentenced to 20 years in prison.

Omar Chabán died on 17 November 2014, aged 62, from Hodgkin's lymphoma.
