= National Route A002 (Argentina) =

Highway in Argentina

Coordinates: 34°43′20″S 58°30′48″W

- Ruta nacional A002

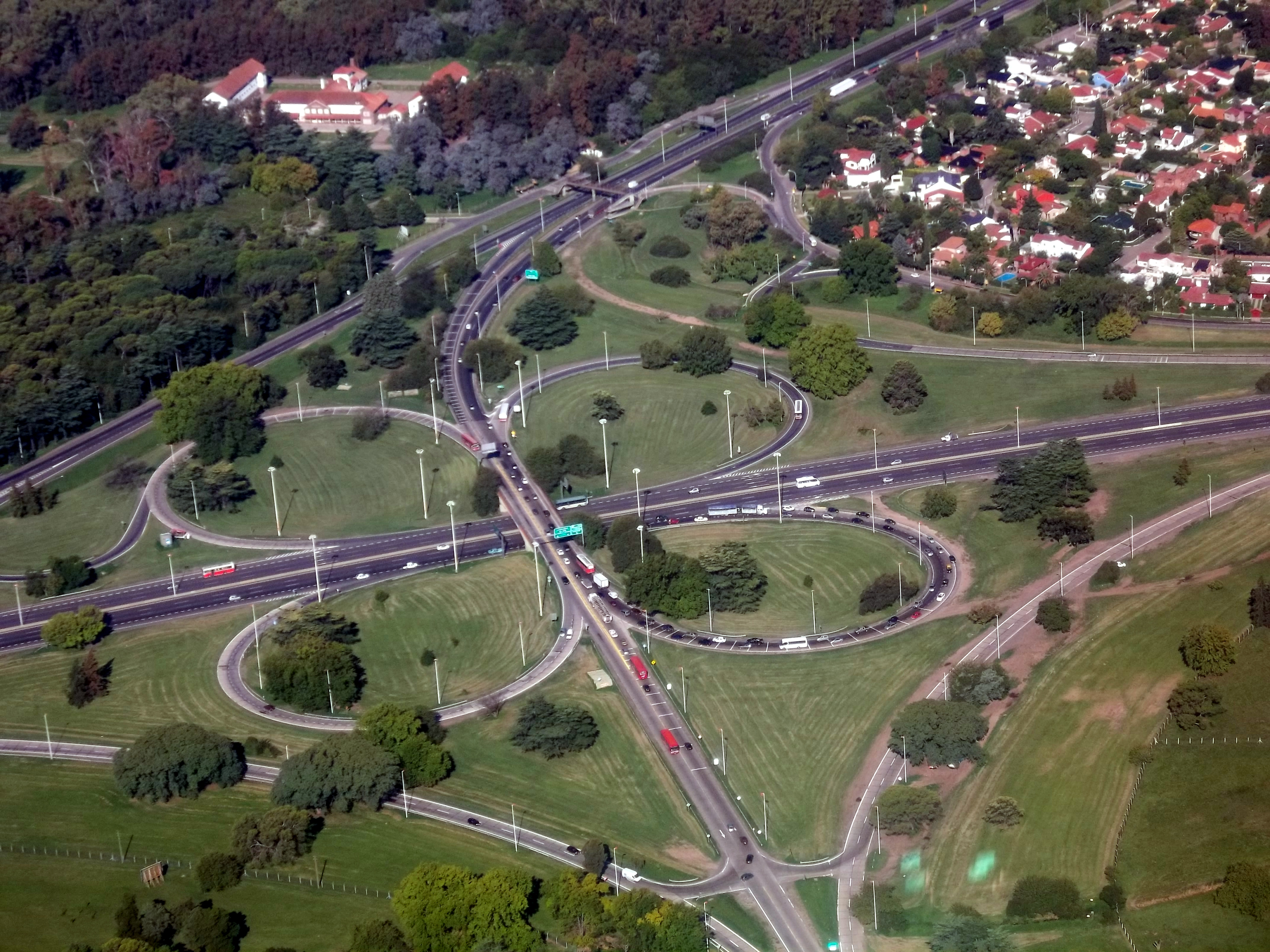
- A cloverleaf interchange on the Riccheri Freeway (left to right), just north of the airport.

Route information
- Length: 16 km (9.9 mi)

Major junctions
- E end: Avenida General Paz
- W end: Ezeiza Airport

Location
- Country: Argentina

Highway system
- Highways in Argentina

National Route A002 Autopista Teniente General Pablo Riccheri connects Avenida General Paz with Ministro Pistarini International Airport (Ezeiza).

== History ==
Established by Decree N°10116 on 29 May 1952, in honor of General Pablo Riccheri, the freeway was originally built in 1948 with three lanes on each side. It joins the partidos of La Matanza, Esteban Echeverría, and Ezeiza. The 16 km (10 mi) freeway travels through the cities of (from north to south) Ciudad Madero, Tapiales, Aldo Bonzi, Ciudad Evita, and Ezeiza.

The freeway was scene of the Ezeiza Massacre, in which at least 13 died in clashes between left and right-wing Peronists vying for the best vantage points from which to view the motorcade for exiled former President Juan Perón upon his return to Argentina on June 20, 1973.

It was leased to Autopistas del Sur in 1994, as part of a privatization drive by President Carlos Menem. The company has established a system of pneumatic tubes and computers, carrying the money collected from the toll booths to a safe location. Approximately 4.5 million vehicles pass through the Riccheri toll plaza, located in Ciudad Madero, per month.
