= Don Osvaldo =

Argentine rock band

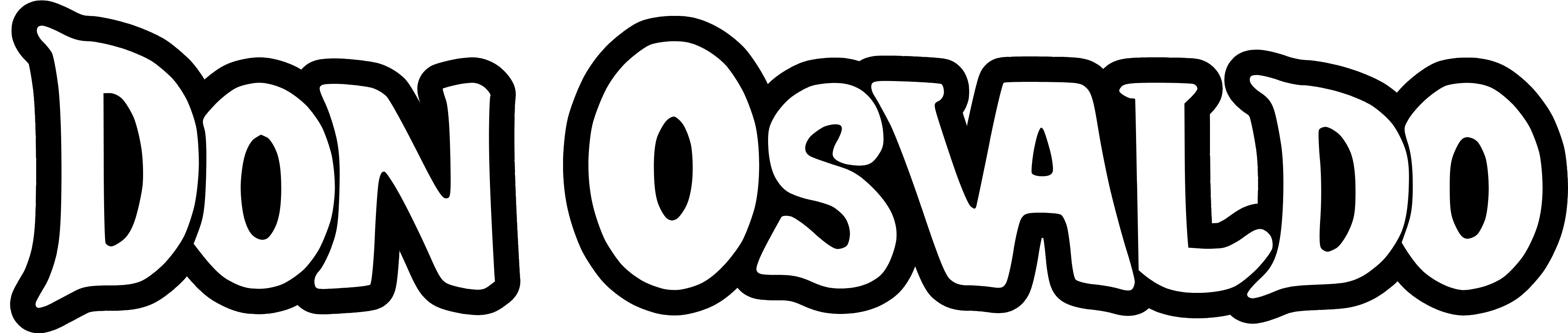

Background information
- Origin: Greater Buenos Aires, Argentina
- Genre: Argentine rock
- Years active: 2010-2012, 2014-2016, 2018-present.
- Spinoff of: Callejeros
- Members: Patricio "Pato" Fontanet (Voice); Christián "Diosito" Torrejón (Bass); Luis Gabriel Lamas (Drums); Álvaro Pedi Puentes (Guitar and Vocals); Gastón Videla (Guitar); Juan Julio Falcone (Percussion); Gabriel Gerez (Keyboard); Leopoldo Janin (Saxophone); Enzo Sánchez (Saxophone and Backing Vocals)
- Past members: Abel "Crispin" Pedrello (Guitar)
- Website: www.don-osvaldo.com.ar

Don Osvaldo is a local rock band formed in November 2010 after the breakup of Callejeros on November 12 of that same year, led by Patricio Santos Fontanet. The band was initially called Casi Justicia Social, also known as CJS (from its initials, which abbreviated the name of the group Callejeros). However, on September 29, 2014, it was announced that the group would change its name to the current Don Osvaldo in homage to Osvaldo Pugliese.

== History ==
=== Formation ===
In late 2010, following the breakup of Callejeros due to internal problems within the group that arose after the tragic events at the Republic of Cromangon nightclub and the subsequent legal entanglements and tensions with the victims' families, Patricio Santos Fontanet announced the formation of Casi Justicia Social. This new project included some former Callejeros bandmates. The group ultimately consisted of Christián Torrejón on bass (one of the founders of Don Osvaldo), Álvaro "Pedi" Puentes on guitar (who had replaced Maxi Djerfy after his departure from Callejeros in 2008), Luis "Lulú" Lamas on drums (replacing Eduardo Vázquez after his departure from Callejeros in February 2010), and Abel "Crispín" Pedrello on guitar (who replaced Elio Delgado after his departure from Callejeros in June 2010). The new band adopted the initials CJS, which were emblematic of Don Osvaldo

=== 2010-2012: Casi Justicia Social ===
After its renewed lineup, Casi Justicia Social presented a series of concerts across different parts of Argentina, performing songs by Callejeros and their own demos, such as "O no", "Suerte", "Acordate" and "Tanto de Todo". The new band debuted on November 30, 2010, at Club Banda Norte in Río Cuarto, Córdoba, before an audience of 800 people, followed by two performances in the city of Córdoba on December 1 and 2.

Throughout 2011, the group embarked on a tour that took them to venues across the country. They also re-recorded the songs released the previous year in demo format.

On February 10, 2012, they performed at the Cosquín Rock festival before an audience of approximately 40,000 people, playing a 20-song setlist. In March, they toured the Cuyo region, with dates scheduled in Mendoza, San Luis, and San Juan. However, due to issues related to the Vendimia festival, the tour was postponed by one week, during which they sold out shows in all three provinces. They later performed in Mendoza, drawing around 5,000 attendees, and then in San Juan, with a similar crowd. The concert scheduled for March 11 in San Luis was canceled two hours before showtime because the venue was not suitable to accommodate the expected number of attendees. On April 21, they performed before an audience of 10,000 people at the Pedro Carossi Amphitheater in the city of Baradero, Buenos Aires. This show featured guest appearances by violinist Fani Corsini, trumpeter Hugo Lobo (from Dancing Mood), and the return of percussionist Juano Falcone. Additionally, as a surprise, they released a new demo titled "Dos Secas".

On May 12 and 13, they performed in the cities of Santa Fe and Reconquista, respectively. In Santa Fe, they played at the Ángel P. Malvicino Stadium, and in Reconquista, at the Platense Porvenir Stadium. Both events were held without media promotion and were advertised exclusively through their website. Toward the end of that month, after rescheduling their concert agenda for June and July, they announced they would begin pre-production of their first studio album. However, following the arrest of Callejeros members, including Fontanet and Torrejón, the band did not take the stage again. As a result, the concerts they performed on December 1 and 2, 2012, in Baradero marked the end of the band as it had been known up to that point.

=== 2014-2019: Don Osvaldo ===
On January 15, 2014, after several previews shared by Estefanía Miguel (the ex-wife of Patricio Fontanet and mother of his son Homero), the band confirmed on its official Facebook page the completion of the first stage of what would become its first studio album. According to the announcement on the social network, the album contained fourteen songs, all of which had already been recorded in demo form.

On August 5, 2014, the Supreme Court ordered the release of the musicians charged in the Cromañón case. As a result, Fontanet and Torrejón were released from prison the following day, and the band was able to reunite once again.

On September 29 of that same year, it was announced through social media that the group would change its name to Don Osvaldo. In the early hours of that day, Fontanet appeared at a concert by La Mona Jiménez and announced that the band (now under a new name) would return to the stage in Córdoba on November 12, exactly four years after the consolidation of Casi Justicia Social. Additionally, Don Osvaldo’s official website confirmed upcoming shows in Santa Fe, Mendoza, and Tucumán. The production of a new album was also mentioned — one that had already been announced months earlier under the title "Casi Justicia Social," the same name the band had used between 2010 and 2014.

In 2015, Don Osvaldo embarked on its first international tour, performing in Montevideo, Uruguay, on April 24 and 25, as well as in Santiago, Chile, on August 15. They also toured throughout Argentina, making it the year with the highest number of live performances in the band’s career. By the end of 2015, the band was already performing songs from their new album live. On December 4, 2015, they released their first album as Casi Justicia Social, which included 15 songs such as "Suerte," "Misterios," and "O no," among others. This album was presented live on January 16, 2016, at the Villa María Amphitheater in Córdoba, and on January 24 at the Metropolitano Stadium in Rosario.

In April 2016, Fontanet and Torrejón were sentenced to seven and five years in prison, respectively, in connection with the Cromañón case. Torrejón was released shortly after serving two-thirds of his sentence, and in May 2018, Fontanet was granted parole.

=== 2018-2020: Casi Justicia Social II ===
In June and July 2018, Don Osvaldo returned to the stage with 10 concerts in the province of Córdoba, with most of them sold out. In September of that year, the band performed twice in Corrientes (with 6,000 people per show), as well as in Salta and Tucumán. The following month, Don Osvaldo held three concerts at Arena Maipú in Mendoza. In October 2018, the band announced four final shows to close the year, drawing an audience of approximately 9,000 people at the Pedro Carossi Amphitheater in Baradero.

In January 2019, Don Osvaldo gave a concert in Ciudad de la Costa, Uruguay, and in February they returned after three years to the Cosquín Rock Festival in Córdoba, becoming the festival’s headline band with around 90,000 attendees. Later, they announced a tour of three cities in Southern Argentina scheduled for late March that year, but all concerts were canceled one week before the planned dates because Patricio Rogelio Santos Fontanet had to undergo vocal cord surgery.

In October, the single "Ciegos" was released, serving as the first preview of the band’s second album. That same month, they also released the singles "Los dueños," "Espejito, espejito," and "Primeras piedras."

On December 3, 2019, the band released its second album, titled "Casi Justicia Social II," which became available in all record stores and rock shops across the country.

Originally, a nationwide tour had been scheduled for 2020, but it was unfortunately canceled due to the COVID-19 pandemic. That year, the band released two singles: "Bienvenidos" and "Normal."

=== 2021-present: Flor de Ceibo ===
It was not until February 2021 that the band was able to return to the stage after two years of absence. This took place at Plaza de la Música in Córdoba, with 11 consecutive shows. During these concerts, they premiered several songs from their album "Casi Justicia Social II", as well as their two most recent singles, all while following COVID-19 safety protocols. In March, the band traveled to Uruguay for two concerts at the Antel Arena in Montevideo, and later that month, they performed five shows in the province of Santa Fe at the Juan de Garay Amphitheater. On July 9, they released a single titled "Estampita", and starting in September, the band returned to Córdoba for three consecutive nights. In October, they held six concerts at the Metropolitano in Rosario, which were their first restriction-free shows since 2019. They closed the year on December 30 at the festival "No Nos Cuenten Cromañón", marking their return to Argentina’s Capital Federal after 17 years.

In 2022, they released two new singles, "Un Demonio" and "Feliz y Seguro", while continuing to tour across the country and embarking on their first tour of Spain, with five dates across the Iberian nation. Finally, on December 30, 2022, the band released their third album, titled "Flor de Ceibo", which contains a total of 11 songs. In 2023, they performed two shows at the auxiliary field of Morón Stadium, which became their closest performances to Capital Federal since 2004 (with Callejeros), already foreshadowing Fontanet’s return to Buenos Aires stages. Toward the end of the year, they performed two more shows at the same venue.

In 2024, after a long time, they held seven shows at Luna Park Stadium, marking Fontanet’s return to Buenos Aires stages after 20 years (since December 30, 2004). This was a deeply emotional milestone for both the band and the audience, as censorship had previously prevented such an event for many years. The concerts took place on January 25, 27, 28, and 30, and on March 24, 25, and 28.

In 2025, the band reached a football stadium in Capital Federal for the first time, and it was also Fontanet’s first time performing in one there in over 20 years. They played two sold-out shows at All Boys Stadium on March 22 and 23 in the Floresta neighborhood, the same area where Callejeros had their rehearsal (and later recording) studio. Two additional dates were added for September 12 and 13, while the band continued touring throughout Argentina, Chile, Uruguay, and Spain.

In June 2025, the band released its first official DVD, titled "Zona Liberada", featuring previously unreleased audiovisual material compiled from live performances between 2022 and 2025 in Baradero, Quilmes, Villa Ballester, Morón, General Rodríguez, Luna Park, La Plata, and All Boys Stadium. The setlist spans all three of the band’s studio albums, along with covers and bonus tracks featuring Callejeros classics.

== Members ==
- Patricio Santos Fontanet: Vocals
- Christian Torrejón: Bass
- Álvaro Puentes: Guitar
- Luis G. Lamas: Drums
- Gastón Videla: Guitar
- Juan Julio Falcone: Percussion
- Gabriel Gerez: Keyboards
- Leopoldo Janin: Saxophone
- Enzo Sánchez: Saxophone and backing vocals

== Discography ==
=== Albums studios ===
- Casi Justicia Social I (2015)
- Casi Justicia Social II (2019)
- Flor de Ceibo (2022)

=== Simples ===
- Ciegos (2019)
- Espejito, Espejito (2019)
- Primeras Piedras (2019)
- Los Dueños (2019)
- Bienvenidos (2020)
- Normal (2020)
- Estampita (2021)
- Un Demonio (2022)
- Feliz y seguro (2022)

=== DVD ===
- Zona Liberada (2025)

== Musicals Tours ==
- Tour: Don Osvaldo (2014-2015)
- Tour: Casi Justicia Social (2016-2019)
- Tour: Suena Don Osvaldo (2021-2022)
- Argentine Tour and Mundial: Flor de Ceibo (2023-2024)
- Tour 2025: Por Los Invisibles (2025-Actualidad)
