= Reckless homicide =

Homicide caused by the recklessness of another

Reckless homicide is a type of homicide and crime in which the perpetrator was aware that their act (or failure to act when there is a legal duty to act) creates significant risk of death or grievous bodily harm in the victim, but ignores the risk and continues to act (or fail to act), and a human death results. It is contrasted with negligent homicide, in which the perpetrator did not have the awareness of the risk, but should have had it.

== See also ==
- Manslaughter
