= Callejeros =

Musical group from Argentina

- Origin: Villa Celina, Buenos Aires, Argentina
- Genres: Argentine rock; rolinga rock; alternative rock
- Years active: 1995–2010
- Label: Rocanroles Argentinos
- Members: Patricio Santos Fontanet; Christián "Dios" Torrejón; Abel "Crispín" Pedrellos; Luis Lamas; Álvaro "Pedi" Puentes; Juancho Carbone
- Past members: Eduardo Vázquez; Elio Delgado; Maximiliano Djerfy; Guillermo Le Voci; Gustavo Varela
- Website: www.callejeros.com.ar

Callejeros ('streetwise', 'stray dogs') was an Argentine rock band that gained international notoriety when the nightclub where they were playing, República Cromañon, was set on fire during one of its shows, killing 194 attendees, in 2004.

== History ==
The band was formed in mid-1995 by a group of young people of Villa Celina, Greater Buenos Aires. They were known initially as Río Verde ("Green River") and mostly played covers of Chuck Berry, Creedence Clearwater Revival and Patricio Rey y sus Redonditos de Ricota. At the end of 1996 the band changed its lineup and recruited new members. Given the extensive change to the original group, in January 1997, they changed their name to Callejeros. A new guitarist and a saxophonist came into the band between late 1999 and early 2000, and it is with this lineup that Callejeros recorded the three albums it has released to date.

In 2001 they recorded their first album, Sed ("Thirst"), in which they followed the rock format they had kept for years, but with the participation of sax player Juan Carbone, former member of Viejas Locas. A single came out of this album, Vicioso, jugador y mujeriego, and a video was made for it, but did not see much TV airtime.

Their second album, Presión ("Pressure"), also self-released, came out in 2003. It premiered at the Atlanta football stadium in Buenos Aires and it included fourteen songs, ranging in style from tango, ballad, rhythms of candombe (black music from Uruguay) and Latin rock up to classic rock'n'roll. This record made their name known in almost the whole country and, to some degree, in Latin America. Not long after the release of the album, the first single, Una nueva noche fría ("A New Cold Night"), was aired on radio and music TV stations during several months.

After playing at the Obras Sanitarias Stadium, known in Buenos Aires as the "temple of rock", in 2004, it seemed as if the band would reach far, because of its growth in popularity in such a short time. In a six months span, they went from drawing less than a thousand people, to play in arenas with capacity of five thousand or more attendees.

In late 2004, they released their third album, Rocanroles sin destino ("Rock 'n roll without Destiny"). It did not have the "power" of previous albums, but more attention went into describing themselves, their lives, their career as musicians and the conflicts that fame brings. The album was played live twice: First in Córdoba, in front of ten thousand people, and then in the Club Atlético Excursionistas football stadium, for an audience of almost fifteen thousand people.

=== Cromañón ===
The night of December 30, 2004, the band played a concert at the club República Cromagnon, in Buenos Aires. During the show, someone in the audience lit a small firework that threw light balls up, which impacted a plastic fibre net that held the acoustical panels (made of foam rubber, to lower costs) and combustion began. The club was overcrowded (there were more than four thousand attendees, and it had a capacity of two thousand people) and the emergency exits had been (illegally) locked from the outside. The fire spread and eventually killed 194 people, mostly due to burnings in the respiratory tract and inhalation of carbon monoxide. Among the dead spectators were relatives of various band members, such as the lead guitarist’s father, cousin, uncle, aunt, and godson, the drummer’s mother, the percussionist’s brother, the band manager's wife and finally, the lead singer's girlfriend.

The band was investigated by the authorities regarding their responsibility in the tragedy, because it was well known that the audience frequently made use of pyrotechnic devices during their shows; though in this case Callejeros had asked them not to, to no avail.

In April 2011, an appeal court found the six band members criminally responsible for the fire.

=== After Cromañón ===
After República Cromañón, Callejeros did not play for a long time. First, due to their own decision, then because of the opposition from the relatives of victims of the fire.

In May 2006, the band released their fourth album, Señales ("Signs"), which sold 20,000 copies on its release day. The band signed a contract with Pelo Music and had both previous albums re-released (Sed and Presión) by this company.

On July 6, 2006, Callejeros appeared without prior announcement during a concert of the band Jóvenes Pordioseros, in El Teatro, a club in Flores, Buenos Aires. The band had previously agreed not to go on stage, and the show was suspended by the management of the club. Later, relatives of the victims expressed mixed opinions about it; some claimed that the band had "the right" to play because there was no judicial order to keep them from doing so, while others called it "a mistake", or claimed that they should be in prison. After the tragedy, the band played five more times, always outside Buenos Aires city. Their last performance was in Olavarría, Buenos Aires Province.

=== Second trial ===
In April 2011, an appeal court retried them and found the members of the band guilty, sentencing each of them to eleven years in prison. In October 2012, the band members were sentenced to 7 years of prison, effective immediately. Founding member Fontanet was moved to a psychiatric clinic in Córdoba. On June 10, 2013, he moved from the clinic in Córdoba to the Ezeiza prison psychiatric ward. He traveled in an ambulance accompanied by his girlfriend Stephanie Miguel and a mobile Federal Prison Service. On August 6, 2014, the Supreme Court granted the extraordinary appeal filed by the band, releasing them pending a new ruling. However, in April 2016, the Criminal Cassation Chamber, upon reviewing the ruling, sentenced Patricio Santos Fontanet to 7 years in prison and 5 years to the rest of the musicians. Currently all musicians except Eduardo Vázquez are on probation, after having served two thirds of the custodial sentence.

== Members ==
- Patricio Santos "Pato" Fontanet – vocals
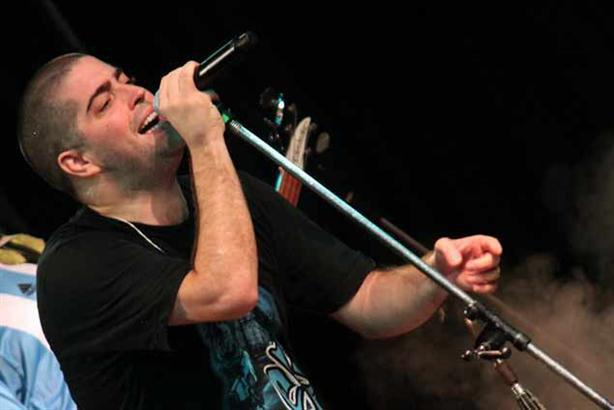
  A picture of Patricio Rogelio Santos "Fontanet" on stage
- Christian "Dios" Torrejón – bass
- Elio Delgado – guitars
- Maximiliano Djerfy – guitars (died March 12, 2021, aged 46)
- Eduardo Vázquez – drums
- Juan "Juancho" Carbone – saxophone

== Discography ==
=== Solo x hoy (Demo), 1997 ===
This is a demo made up of 11 songs in cassette format, recorded with a 4-track between the months of July 1997 and August 1997. Now few copies of the tape exist.

==== LADO A ====
1. Durmiendo en la seccional
2. Bufón
3. Lejos del cielo
4. Pichones
5. Zapatos muy grandes
6. Vivo en mi ilusión

==== LADO B ====
1. Botija
2. Teatro
3. Ancho de espadas
4. Milonga Rocanrol
5. Rito de Holoalocû

=== Callejeros (Demo), 1998 ===
Independent production composed by 13 songs with greater variety of styles. It was recorded and mixed in WC Recording Studio in October 1998. This work stood out by to have sold more than 600 copies of same between cassettes and the CD.

1. Pichones [Sparrows]
2. Puñales [Daggers]
3. No volvieron más [They never Came Back]
4. Brillan los fantasmas [Ghosts are Glowing]
5. Armar de nuevo [To assemble Again]
6. Milonga Del rocanrol
7. No somos nadie [We are nobody]
8. Ancho de espadas [Ace Of Spades]
9. One after 909 (Lennon-McCartney)
10. Lejos del cielo (Folk tradicional) [Far from heaven]
11. Un monarca [A King]
12. La cuadra [The Street block]
13. Brillan los fantasmas (Versión lenta) [Ghosts are Glowing] (acoustic Version)

=== Adelantos (Demo), 2000 ===
As the name says it well (Advances), this he is demo made up of 7 songs that came playing in shows. So that people knew them was made east registry, engraving in one portaestudio of 4 channels during the month of June 2000.

==== LADO A ====
1. Rompiendo espejos
2. A tinto regalado
3. Palo borracho
4. Teatro

==== LADO B ====
1. Pensar en nada (León Gieco)
2. Los invisibles
3. La buena vida

=== Sed, 2001 ===
It is made up of 12 songs, of which 4 are from the Adelantos cassette and 1, Milonga rocanrol, is from Callejeros. In addition, it is the first registry of the band in which saxo is included. The disc was recorded, mixed and masterized in El Matadero records in October 2001. It is worth noting that this was a totally independent production.

1. Los invisibles [The Invisibles]
2. Rompiendo espejos [Broking Mirrors]
3. El nudo [The Knot]
4. Milonga del rocanrol
5. Jugando [Playing]
6. Vicioso, jugador y mujeriego [Vicious, Gambler And Woman Chasing]
7. Palo borracho [Stick Drunk]
8. Sonando [It's Sounding]
9. Tiempo de estar [Time To Stay]
10. Teatro [Theatre]
11. Sed [Thirst]
12. Ojalá se los lleve [Let's Hope Take It Back]

=== Presión, 2003 ===
In March 2003 the band released their second album, Presión (Pressure), again in totally independent form, on the El Matadero records label. The single off this album, Una nueva noche fría (Another cold night) received wide airplay on radio and music TV, from its release in August 2004 until the beginning of January 2005, when it was essentially boycotted due to the Cromagnon nightclub fire.

1. Otro viento mejor [Another Better Wind]
2. Presión [Pressure]
3. Tres [Three]
4. Una nueva noche fría [A New Cold Night]
5. Fantasía y realidad [Fantasy And Reality]
6. Morir [To Die]
7. Cristal
8. Imposible [Impossible]
9. Callejero de Boedo [Boedo Street Man]
10. Si me cansé [If I'm Tired]
11. Ahogados de razón [Swallow Of Reason]
12. Tiempo perdido [Lost Time]
13. El duende del árbol [The Dorf Of The Tree]
14. Ilusión [Illusion]

=== Rocanroles sin destino, 2004 ===
1. Distinto [Different]
2. Sé que no sé [I Know That I Don't Know]
3. Sería una pena [It Would Be A Shame]
4. Algo peor, algo mejor [Something Worse, Something Better]
5. Rebelde, agitador y revolucionario [Rebel, Communist And Revolutionary]
6. Un lugar perfecto [A Perfect Place]
7. Todo eso [All That]
8. Prohibido [Prohibited]
9. Tan perfecto que asusta [So Perfect It's Scary]
10. Tratando de olvidar [Trying To Forget]
11. Rocanroles sin destino [Rock And Roll Without Destiny]
12. La llave [The Key]
13. Parte menor [Minor Part]
14. Canciones y almas [Songs And Souls]

=== Señales, 2006 ===
1. Daños [Damages]
2. Puede [It Can]
3. Límites [Limits]
4. Creo [I Believe]
5. Frente al río [In Front Of The River]
6. Sin paciencia [Without Patience]
7. Día a día [Day To Day]
8. Sueño [I Dream]
9. Hoy [Today]
10. 9 de Julio
11. Señales [Signals]
12. Desencuentro [Disagreement]

=== Disco Escultura, 2008 ===
1. Guiños [Winks]
2. El Espejo [The Mirror]
3. La Canción [The Song]
4. Rehén [Hostage]
5. Esa Invisible Linea [That Invisible Line]
6. Mas allá [Beyond]
7. Quedó [Stay]
8. Siempre un poco más [Always A Little More]
9. El Ignorante [The Ignorant]
10. Lo que hay [Is What You Get]
11. Cancion de Cuna para Julieta [Julieta Cradle Song]
12. Si queres que sea yo [If you want to be me]
13. Pompeya

== See also ==
- Casi Justicia Social
