= Alsina =

Alsina is a surname. Notable people with the surname include:

- Adolfo Alsina (1829–1877), Argentine lawyer and Unitarian politician
- August Alsina (born 1992), American singer
- Josep Alsina (born 1954), Catalan academic and activist
- Juan Perez Alsina, Argentine politician for the Salta Renewal Party
- Landelino Lavilla Alsina (1934–2020), Spanish politician
- Manuel F. Alsina Capo (1909–2008), prominent Spanish-American urologist surgeon
- Oriol Alsina (born 1967), Spanish football manager
- Pau Alsina (2008–2025), Spanish motorcycle racer
- Ramón Martí Alsina (1826–1894), Spanish Eclectic painter
- Valentín Alsina (1802–1869), Argentine lawyer and politician

== See also ==
- Estación Puente Alsina, Argentine railway station in the Greater Buenos Aires neighbourhood of Valentín Alsina
- Puente Alsina (film), 1935 Argentine musical film directed and written by José A. Ferreyra
- Puente Valentín Alsina, neo colonial bridge over the Riachuelo inaugurated in 1938
- Adolfo Alsina Partido, western partido of the Buenos Aires Province, Argentina
- Valentín Alsina, Buenos Aires, city in the Lanús Partido of Buenos Aires Province, Argentina
- Zanja de Alsina, system of trenches and fortifications built in the centre and south of the Buenos Aires Province
