= Puente Alsina railway station =

Railway station in Buenos Aires, Argentina

Coordinates: 34°39′40″S 58°24′56″W

Puente Alsina
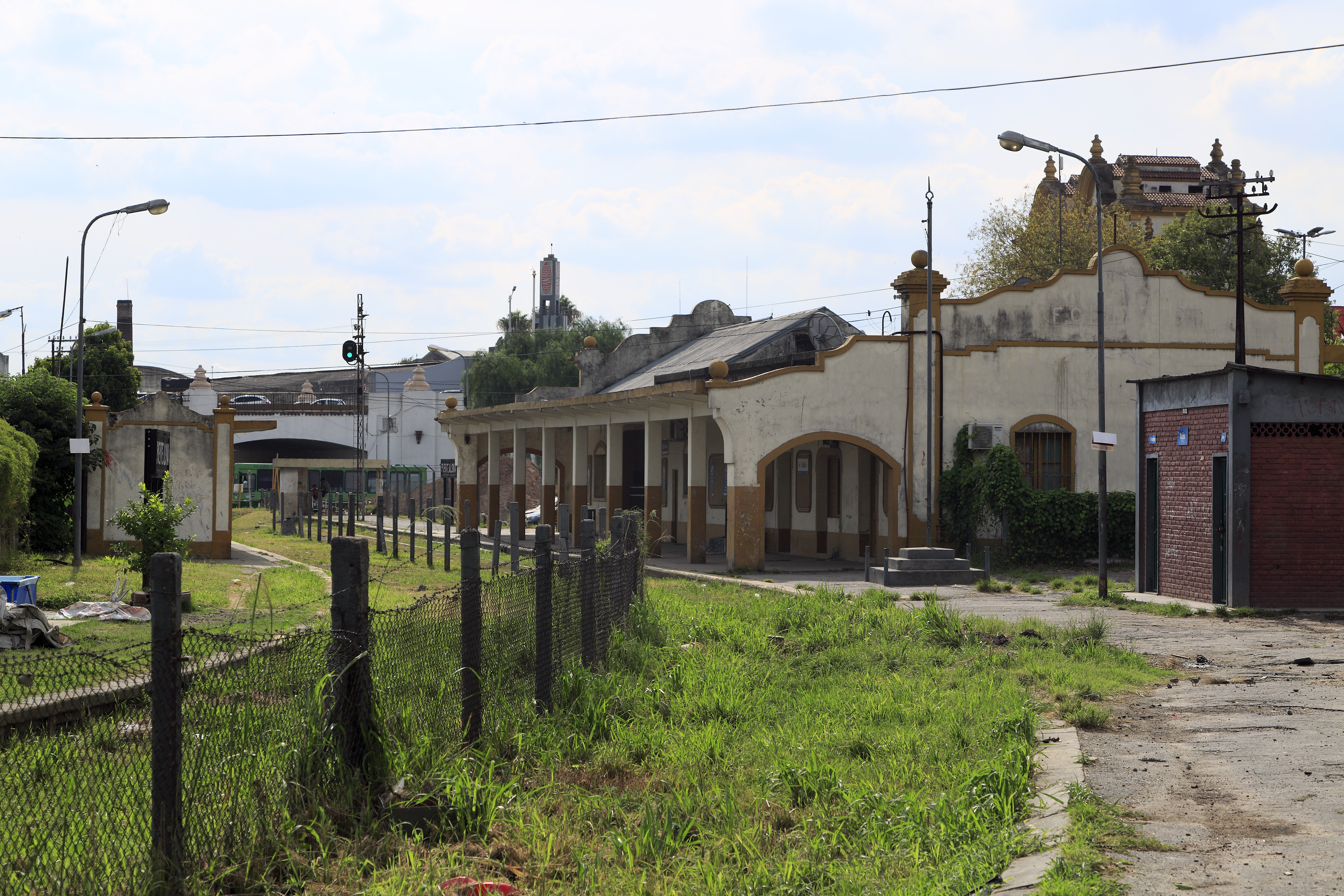
- The closed station in 2018

General information
- Location: Puente Alsina; Lanús Partido; Argentina
- System: Commuter rail
- Owner: Government of Argentina
- Operator: Trenes Argentinos
- Line: Belgrano Sur
- Tracks: 2

Construction
- Platform levels: 2

History
- Opened: 1908
- Closed: August 2017; 9 years ago
Location

Puente Alsina is an Argentine former railway station in the Greater Buenos Aires neighbourhood of Valentín Alsina in the Lanús partido of Buenos Aires Province. The station took its name from the nearby bridge of Puente Alsina over the Riachuelo River. On the other side of this bridge lies the neighbourhood of Nueva Pompeya within the city of Buenos Aires.

The station has remained inactive since August 2017 following the closure of the entire Puente Alsina–Aldo Bonzi line due to a derailment.

== History ==
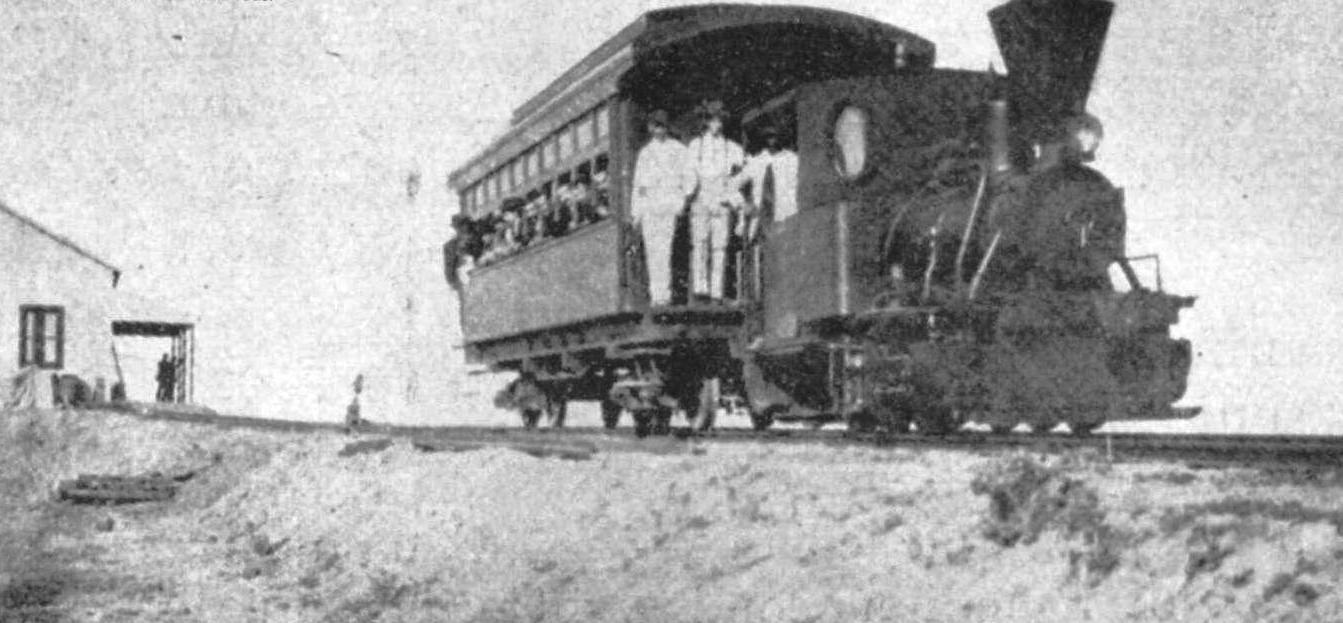
A BA Midland Railway train departing from Puente Alsina, 1908

Built by the British-owned Buenos Aires Midland Railway, the station was opened in 1908 as the terminus for their metre gauge line to Carhué, in the southwest of the province. The original plan was to boost the importance of the line by extending it from Puente Alsina into the centre of the nearby city. However, the fact that the company held a concession from the province, meant that it was unable to enter the Federal Capital. When the entire Argentine railway network was nationalized in 1948, during Juan Peron's presidency, the BAMR became part of the state-owned company Ferrocarril Belgrano.

As part of the privatization of the whole Argentine railway network in the early 1990s, private company Metropolitano was granted a concession to operate the service, part of the Linea Belgrano Sur, as far as General Belgrano, from 1 May 1994. In spite of the large state subsidies received by the company, a serious decline in the standard of its services led to the concession being revoked on 22 May 2007, after which the line was run by UGOFE, a consortium formed by private companies Ferrovías, Metrovías and Trenes de Buenos Aires.

In March 2015 the station started to be operated by state-owned Trenes Argentinos, after the Government rescinded the contract with private company Argentren signed one year before. Nevertheless, after two years of service under Trenes Argentinos, in August 2017 the Government closed the entire Puente Alsina - Aldo Bonzi line due to a derailment. Since then, there have not been plans for the reactivation of services in the line.

== Historic operators ==
Operator	Period
(United Kingdom) Buenos Aires Midland Railway	1911–1948
(Argentina) Ferrocarriles Argentinos	1948–1991
(Argentina) FEMESA (Note: Temporary operator prior to the privatization of commuter rail services.)	1991–1994
(Argentina) Metropolitano	1994–2007
(Argentina) UGOFE (Note: Temporary operator after the government revoked concession to Metropolitano.)	2007–2014
(Argentina) Argentren	2014–2015
(Argentina) Trenes Argentinos	2015–2017

== Bibliography ==
- British Railways in Argentina 1857-1914: A Case Study of Foreign Investment by Colin M. Lewis, Athlone Press (University of London), 1983
- British Railways in Argentina 1860-1948 by H.R. Stones - P.E. Waters & Associates, Bromley, Kent, England, 1993
