= Club Atlético Lanús =

Argentine sports club

Lanús
- Full name: Club Atlético Lanús
- Nickname: Granate (Garnet)
- Founded: 3 January 1915; 111 years ago
- Ground: Estadio Lanús
- Capacity: 47,027
- Chairman: Nicolás Russo
- Manager: Mauricio Pellegrino
- League: Primera División
- 2025: 8th of 30
- Website: clublanus.com
Home colours	Away colours	Third colours

Club Atlético Lanús (Spanish pronunciation: [ˈkluβ aˈtletiko laˈnus]) is an Argentine sports club based in Lanús, a city of the Buenos Aires Province. Founded in 1915, the club's main sports are football and basketball. In both sports, Lanús plays in Argentina's top divisions: Primera División (football) and Liga Nacional de Básquet (basketball). Domestic football major titles won by the club include two Primera División championships, the Copa Bicentenario and one Supercopa Argentina. At international level, Lanús has won one Copa CONMEBOL, and two Copa Sudamericana.

The so-called "Southern Classic" ("Clásico del Sur"), considered a modern classic in Argentine football, is contested against Banfield, and thanks to the good results of both in recent years it is also considered one of the most attractive clásicos of Primera División.

Apart from football, Lanús hosts many other sports such as athletics, gymnastics, martial arts, handball, field hockey, roller skating, swimming, tennis, volleyball, and weightlifting. Besides, the club has a futsal team in Colombia that was founded in 2011.

== History ==
=== Origins and foundation ===
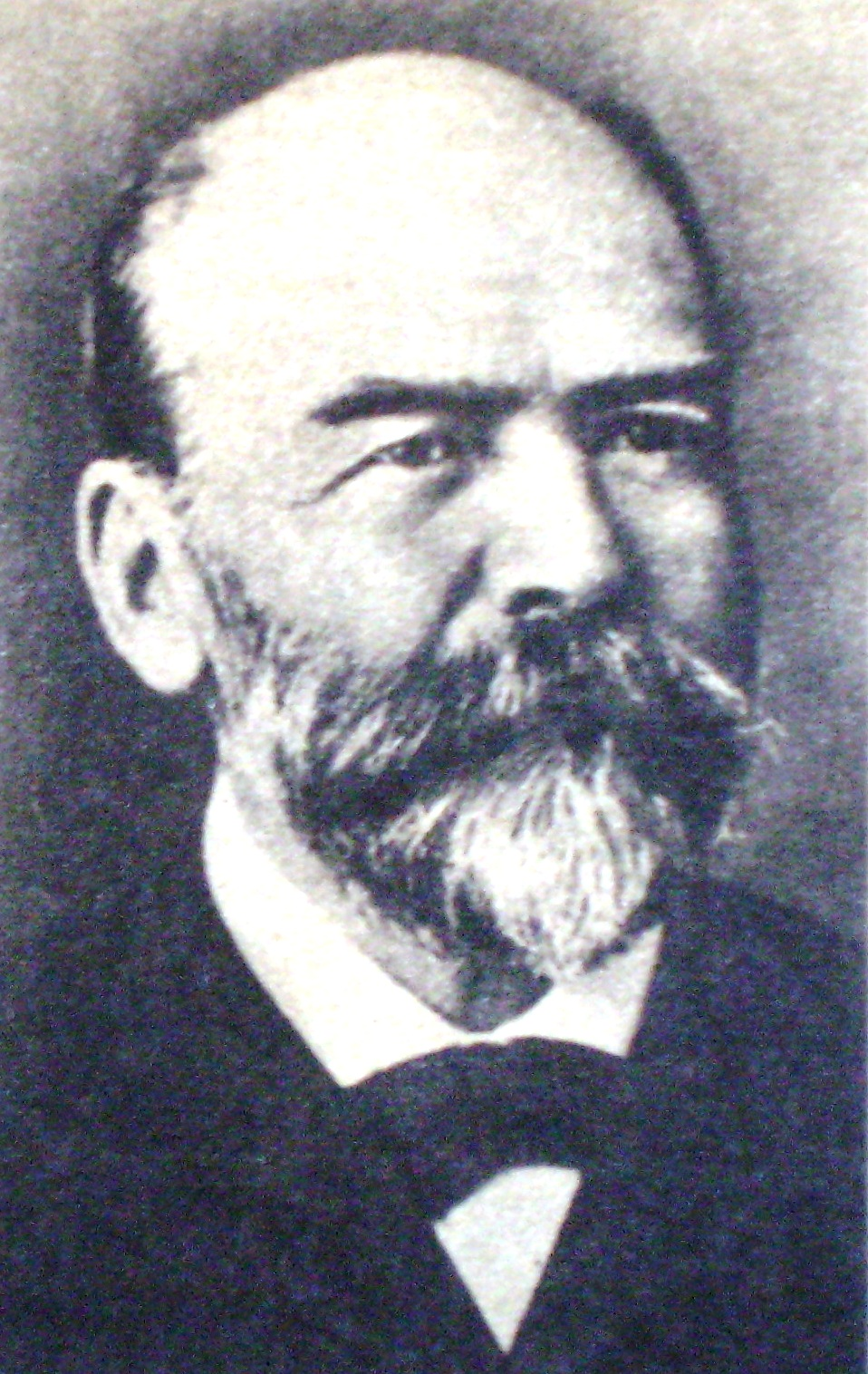
Anacarsis Lanús, founder of the homonymous city. The club was named after him

In 1854 Anacarsis Lanús arrived from France and acquired the lands where he would later establish the city of Lanús, one of the biggest suburbs of Greater Buenos Aires. Two institutions were named "Lanús" by that time. One of them was Lanús Athletic Club, which took part of the 1897 Argentine Primera División championship although the club then abandoned the tournament. The other club was Lanús United (predecessor of current Club Atlético Lanús) which participated in the Copa de Competencia, organised by dissident Federación Argentina de Football in 1913 and 1914.

On 3 January 1915, a new club was established from the merging of two institutions, Lanús United (that was in a desperate financial situation) and Club El Progreso. Miguel Usaray was designed as president, the first in the history of the club. In an assemble held on 27 January 1915, the name "Club Atlético Lanús" was officially established.

=== Debut in Primera: the 1920s ===
The club began to play its matches in División Intermedia (the second division of Argentine football league system by then) at Lanús United old stadium, located in Margarita Wield and General Deheza streets. In 1919 the club got promotion to the top division, Primera División, after beating Argentino de Quilmes. In the first division, Lanús played its first games in the official association, then switching to dissident Asociación Amateurs de Football (AAmF), where the team joined on 8 August 1920, when the squad was defeated by Racing Club by 1–0. That first season in the top division Lanús finished 11th of 20th.

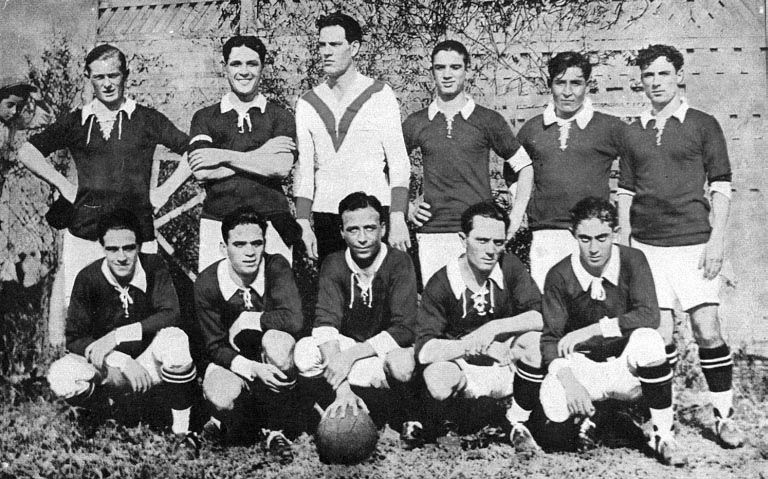
The Lanús team that finished 3rd in the 1927 season

During successive years, Lanús did not achieve great campaigns in Primera, even finishing last in 1923. That season the squad only achieved two wins and lost 14 games of 20. In 1926 Lanús finished 6th and the 1927 season the team finished 3rd to San Lorenzo and Boca Juniors. Lanús earned 50 points with 22 wins over 33 matches played, being defeated 5 times.

On 24 February 1929 Lanús opened its new stadium in the intersection of Héctor Guidi and General Arias streets. The stadium (with wood stands as it was usual for that time) was built on a 50,000 m2 land given by the British-owned company Buenos Aires Great Southern Railway ("Ferrocarril del Sud". Then president of the club, Silvio Peri, made the arrangements to get the cession did not have any cost for the institution, at least for the first years. On 24 March 1929 Lanús played its first match there facing Platense, defeating it by 5–2.

=== The '30s and '40s ===
In 1931 football became professional in Argentina. Lanús did not make a good campaign, finishing penultimate achieving only 22 points, 28 less than champion Boca Juniors. One year later the club inaugurated a new grandstand in its stadium. The first version of the Lanús Anthem, composed by Domingo Ilvento (music) and Daniel Cao (lyrics) was also released.

In 1933 founding member Miguel Iguzguiza made the arrangements to acquire the lands where the new headquarters would be built, on José C. Paz avenue (current 9 de Julio avenue). This was approved in a meeting held on 23 December. One year later the Association obliged both Club Lanús and rival team Talleres de Remedios de Escalada to join in order to play the tournament under the name "Unión Talleres-Lanús", threatening them to be relegated if they did not accept. This fusion was ended in 1935 when both clubs played again separately.

Some of the most notable players of those years were Atilio Ducca (the most capped player in Lanús' history with 291 games). In 1939 forward Luis Arrieta came to the club, scoring 31 goals during his first season with the club. Arrieta was also the top-scorer in 1943 along with Ángel Labruna (River Plate) and Raúl Frutos (Platense). Arrieta would later become the all-time top scorer of Lanús, with 120 goals.

Lanús remained in Primera until 1949 when the team was relegated after a controversial decision from the Association. At the end of the tournament, Boca Juniors was placed last and Lanús penultimate. On 8 December Boca smashed Lanús by 5–1, which finished last along with Huracán. In order to define which team would be relegated, Lanús and Huracán had to play a relegation series. Huracán won the first game 1–0 and Lanús took revenge by 4–1 in the second match so a third game was played. With a partial score of 3–3 the referee awarded a penalty kick to Lanús. The Huracán players, in disagreement with the decision, abandoned the field being the match suspended. The Argentine Association not only did not punished Huracán but it decided to play a new match. During that fourth game the referee did not award a penalty kick to Lanús while Huracán was winning the match by 3–2. As a result, the Lanús players left the field (as their rivals had done before). But the Association decided to punish Lanús relegating the club to Primera B.

=== Return to Primera ===
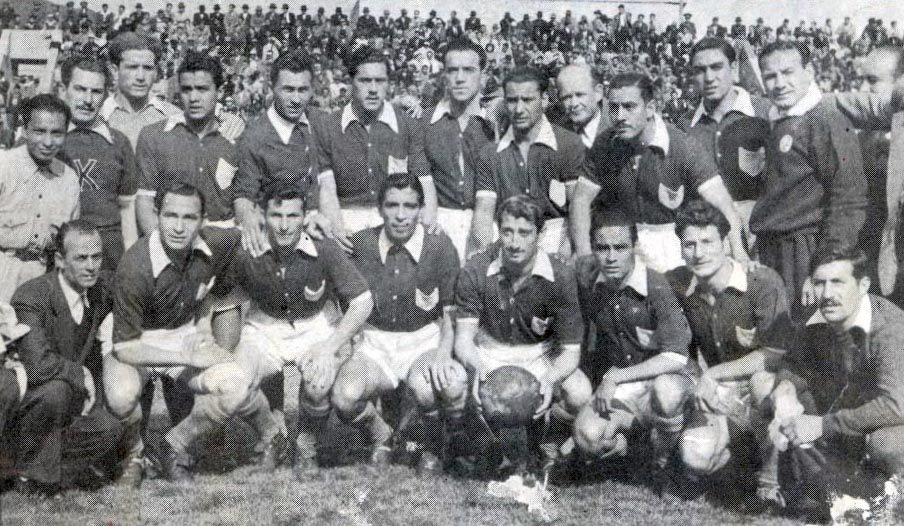
The 1950 Primera B champion

After the controversial decision made by the AFA, Lanús played the 1950 season in the second division. With still 1 fixture to play, Lanús won the championship when the team defeated Argentinos Juniors by 3–1 therefore promoting to Primera División. In Primera B, Lanús played 22 matches with 15 wins and 3 losses. The team achieved large victories over El Porvenir (5–1), Colón (4–2), Temperley (4–1 and 4–0), Argentinos Juniors (4–0), Unión de Santa Fe (6–1) and Nueva Chicago (6–1). The line-up for the game that set up the return to Primera was: Alvarez Vega; Daponte, Mercado; Vargas, Strembel, Vivas; Contreras, Gil, Pairoux, Florio, Moyano. Former Boca Juniors coach Mario Fortunato led the team to the title.

=== "The Globetrotters" ===
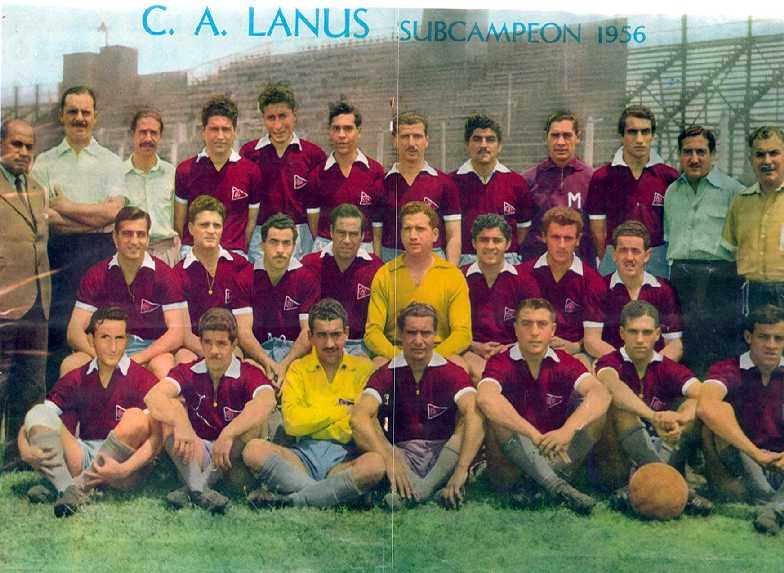
The 1956 runner-up, nicknamed The Globetrotters.

Back in the top division, Lanús would be the sensation of 1951 championship, finishing the first round in the 1st place along with Independiente. Forward José Florio was the top scorer with 21 goals, having been sold to Italian club Torino for a record $ 1,500,000. The club later used the money to build a gym.

Lanús finished 5th in 1954 and 1955. One year later Lanús would achieve its best performance in Primera División until then, finishing 2nd. to River Plate. Due to an outstanding line of forwards (that scored 49 goals in 30 games) and their skills with the ball, that squad was nicknamed The Globetrotters honoring the famous basketball team. The team suffered a lot of injuries all season long, with only Dante Lugo playing all matches. The usual team was Vega; Prato, Beltrán; Daponte, Hector Guidi, Nazionale; Carranza, Lugo, Alfredo Rojas, Urbano Reynoso, Moyano.

The Globetrotters thrashed their rivals with large victories over Argentinos Juniors (4–0), Gimnasia y Esgrima La Plata (5–3), San Lorenzo (4–0) and Huracán (4–2). Nevertheless, the team was beaten by 3–1 by River Plate, that would be later the champion. River Plate squad had players with less individual skills than Lanús', but they were more experienced and those qualities helped them to get the championship at the end of the season.

=== The '60s and '70s ===
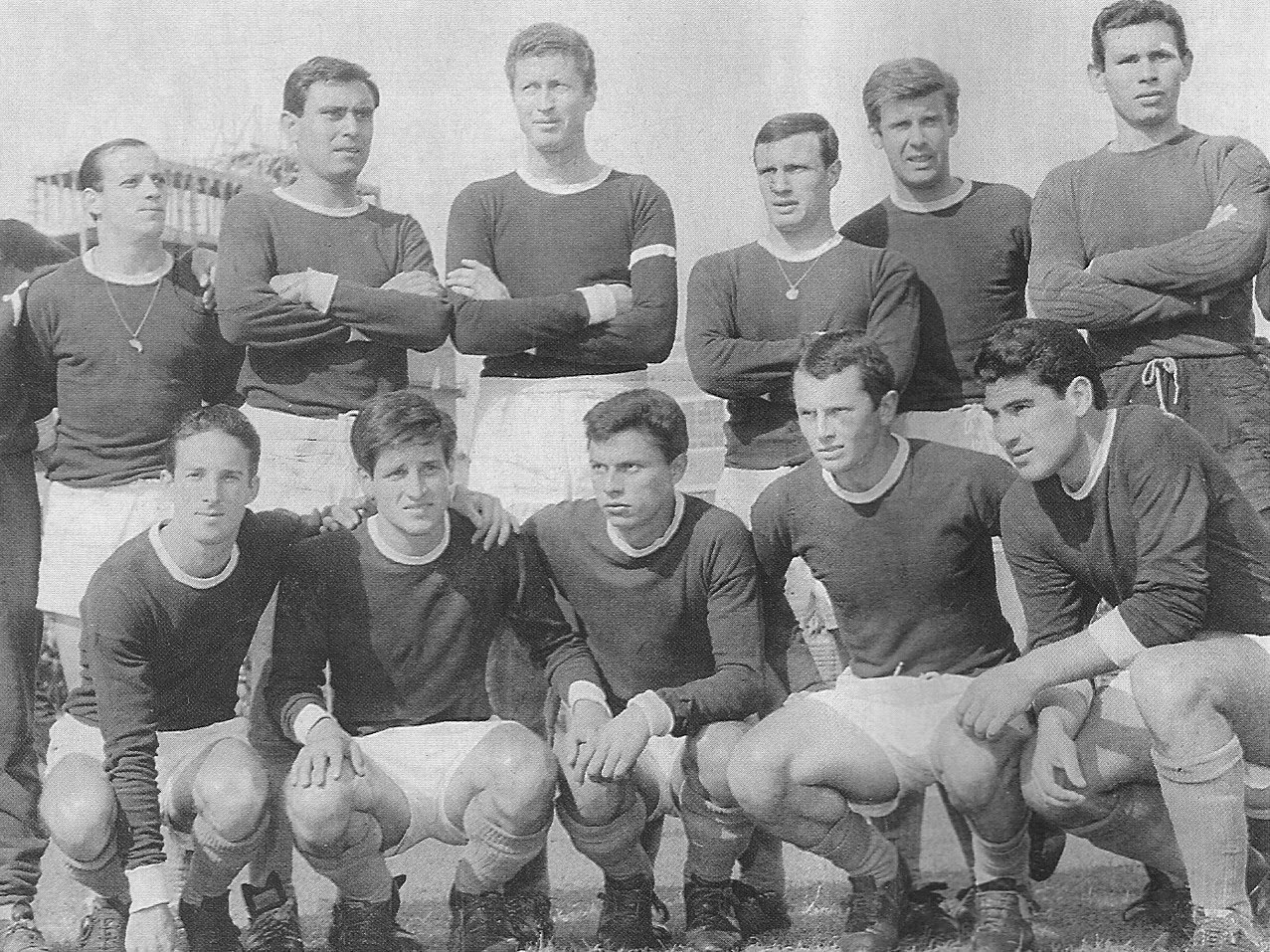
Managed by Héctor Guidi, Lanús won the Primera B title in 1964

After some very irregular performances in Primera División, Lanús was relegated in 1961. The team finished 12th of 24th but it was relegated (along with Los Andes) due to the league system calculated the average during the last three championships (1959, 1960, 1961).

Three years later Lanús won the Primera B title, returning to Primera División. The two forwards of the team, Manuel Silva and Bernardo Acosta, soon got recognition due to the famous "wall pass" they did together, being nicknamed "Los Albañiles" ("The Construction Workers).

In 1966 Héctor Guidi, one of the most notable players in club's history, left football. Three years later Acosta would be transfer to Sevilla. Manuel Silva moved to his new club Newell's Old Boys in 1970, finishing with the Albañiles era. That same year the team was relegated to the second division (along with Unión de Santa Fe) after finishing 7th of 7 in the "Torneo reclasificatorio".

In 1971 Guidi became manager and Lanús started a new season in Primera B. The team made a great campaign winning a new title in second division and therefore promoting to Primera División. Lanús played a total of 28 games, winning 17 with 4 losses. The squad scored 68 goals and received 31. Unfortunately for the club, the tenure of Lanús on 1972 Primera División season was the worst in its history, being relegated again at the end of the championship.

=== The worst crisis ===
Four years later, Lanús returned to Primera after winning the promotion tournament. Once more, the team remained a very short time in Primera so Lanús was relegated after the 1977 season. Lanús was relegated after a controversial decision by penalty kicks in a match against Platense. After 20 penalties shot by all outfield players, it was the goalkeepers' turn. The Lanús goalkeeper shot first, but missed. It was the Platense goalkeeper's turn, but instead, Platense striker Miguel Ángel Juárez took it, breaking the rules. The referee allowed the goal, and Lanús were relegated illegitimately. The club reclaimed, but the Argentine football association did not respond.

In Primera B Lanús had a very poor season and was eventually relegated to the Third Division (Primera C). With debts of over US$2 million, the club faced its worst crisis. By 1979 the club only had 2,000 members facing its first season in the Third Division. The political groups linked with the club's debts decided to forget its differences with the club and helped the club face forward.

Lanús won the 1981 Primera C title various fixtures before the season ended. The club, with help from the fans, was promoted to the Second Division once again having more than 10,000 members. In 1984 the team reached the semifinals of the promotion playoff to the First Division, when the team had to face Racing Club. In the first leg, Racing Club beat Lanús 2–0. In the second leg, played in Independiente's stadium, the referee gave Racing Club a controversial penalty kick after disallowing a Lanús goal. Racing Club scored a goal, but the match was eventually suspended because of Lanús' fans. The match was continued at Atlanta's stadium some days after, and Lanús were down 2–1 after dominating the game. The referee, Emilio Misic, mistakenly gave the final whistle 5 minutes before the end of regulation. The Racing Club players already started celebrating, so the referee used that excuse not to reverse the decision. Lanús was once again disadvantaged because of a referee error, therefore losing the series and failing to gain promotion to the First Division.

Already having more than 25,000 members, the team was promoted to the Second Division in 1986. With Miguel Ángel Russo as manager, the team returned to the First Division after 13 years. Thanks to the team's goalkeeper, Alcides Herrera, the team beat Quilmes in the finals of the promotion playoff. The club also started to repair the old stadium made of wood. Lanús made a poor campaign in Primera División being relegated to Primera B Nacional (the second division since 1986). The club's executives decided to keep Miguel Ángel Russo as manager, regardless of relegation.

=== The resurrection: the 1990s ===
Lanús returned to the top division on 24 May 1992, when more than 30,000 supporters saw how Lanús beat Deportivo Maipú 2–0 winning the 1991–92 Primera B Nacional title. The line-up for the final was Ojeda, Gómez, Agüero, Mainardi, González; H. Enrique, Kuzemka, Schurrer, Angelello; Gambier, Villagrán, with Russo as manager. At the end of the season, Lanús had totalized 57 points in 42 games, with 21 wins and 6 losses, scoring a total of 64 goals and receiving 34.

The good campaign of the team during the 1993 Apertura allowed it to qualify for the Copa CONMEBOL, where Lanús participated for the first time in an international tournament. The team was eventually eliminated by San Lorenzo in the quarter-finals. On 1 October, Ariel Ibagaza made his debut for the team, where he and Hugo Morales formed a midfield duo highly praised by Lanús' fans.

In 1995 Héctor Cúper took charge of the team at the start of the Apertura. Lanús finished 3rd by goal difference and points. The next year turned out to be one of the club's most important. Lanús brought in Claudio Enría from Newell's and Gonzalo Belloso. In the Clausura, Lanús eventually finished 3rd. In the second spell of the year, the club brought in Oscar Mena, Gustavo Falaschi and Gustavo Siviero. Lanús had to face two tournaments at once for the first time in their history, the local tournament and the Copa CONMEBOL. In the local tournament, they finished 3rd once again.

=== International success ===
In 1996 Lanús won the Copa CONMEBOL, a tournament created in 1992. The team eliminated Bolívar in the first stage (4–1, 0–1), then passed Guaraní (2–0, 6–2). In semi-finals defeated Rosario Central (3–0, 3–1) reaching the finals against Independiente Santa Fe of Colombia. In the first leg, Lanús won 2–0. In the second leg, Lanús lost 1–0, resulting in an aggregate score of 2–1, which made Lanús champion. It was Lanús' first major and international title. The line-up for the final match was: Roa; Serrizuela, Falaschi, Siviero, Bresen; Mena, Cravero, Ibagaza, Coyette; Enría, Ariel López. With Mario Gómez as head coach, Lanús also reached the cup final in 1997 but was defeated by Brazilian team Atlético Mineiro (1–4, 1–1).

In 1998, Lanús finished 2nd once more with 40 points behind Vélez Sarsfield, which to date being the club's best campaign in terms of points. Four years later Lanús had to play a relegation playoff versus Huracán de Tres Arroyos, winning 2–1 in Platense's stadium and drawing 1–1 in their stadium. With an aggregate score of 3–2 in favor, Lanús remained in Primera División.

=== First national title ===
In 2003 the stadium repairs were finished. Three years later, with a team based from its youth divisions, Lanús was the runner-up of Torneo Clausura. In 2007 the club got qualification for the 2nd time in a row to the Copa Sudamericana and -for the first time in club's history- to the Copa Libertadores.

Lanús also won its first Primera División title, the 2007 Apertura, being coached by Ramón Cabrero. Lanús celebrated in the 18th fixture with a 1–1 tie to Boca Juniors at La Bombonera. The line-up for that match was: Bossio; Graieb, Ribonetto, Hoyos, Velázquez; Blanco, Pelletieri, Fritzler, Valeri; Acosta, Sand. The squad totalized 38 points in 19 matches, with Sand as the topscorer of the tournament with 15 goals.

The next year Lanús participated in the 2008 Copa Libertadores, finishing unbeaten in the first stage. In the second round, Lanús was eliminated by Mexican Atlas. In domestic competitions, Lanús once again finished sub-champions of 2011 Clausura, behind Vélez Sarsfield.

=== Successful 2010's decade ===
Lanús qualified to play the 2012 Copa Libertadores, where the squad got its biggest win in international competitions in history (6–0 against Paraguayan Olimpia in La Fortaleza). The team led by Gabriel Schürrer won its group and reached the round of 16, where it was eliminated by Vasco Da Gama in penalty shootout.

In 2013, Lanús obtained its second international title, the Copa Sudamericana after beating Brazilian club Ponte Preta in the finals.

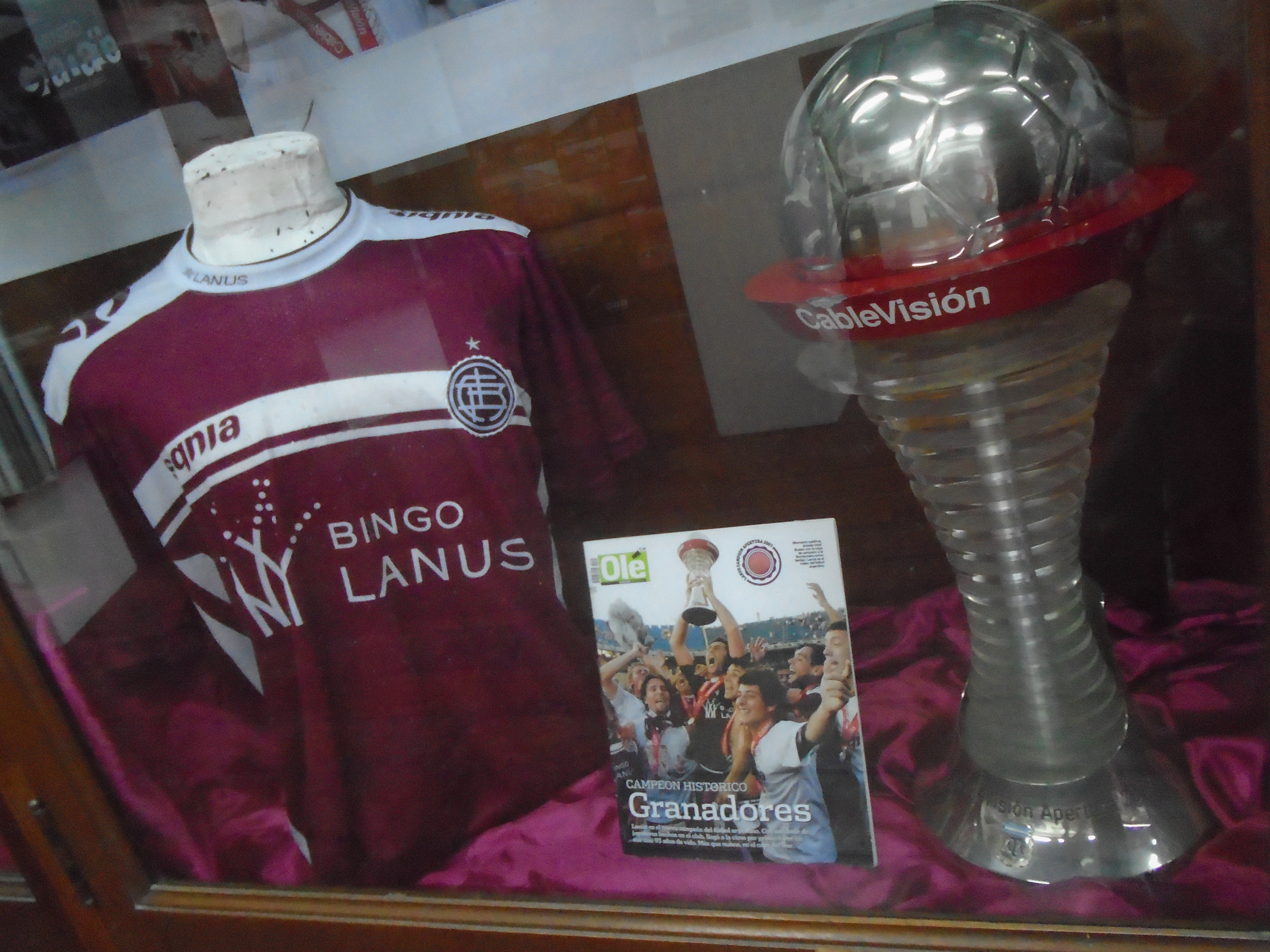
Shirt and trophy awarded after winning the 2016 Primera División, exhibited at C.A. Lanús Museum

In May 2016, Lanús won its second league title, the 2016 Primera División after thrashing San Lorenzo by 4–0 in the final match played at River Plate stadium. The goals were scored by Junior Benítez, Miguel Almirón, José Sand and Lautaro Acosta. The line-up for the match was Fernando Monetti; José Luis Gómez, Gustavo Gómez, Diego Braghieri, Maximiliano Velázquez; Román Martínez, Iván Marcone, Miguel Almirón; Oscar Benítez, José Sand, Lautaro Acosta. The squad was coached by Jorge Almirón.

On 31 October 2017, the club advanced for the first time in its history to the 2017 Copa Libertadores final, after completing a historic feat, defeating fellow Argentine club River Plate by 4–3 on aggregate in the semi-finals, when they were out 3–0 before the end of the first half in the second leg. They lost the final to Grêmio in both legs.

=== 2020s ===
In October 2024, the Argentine Association officialised a championship won by Lanús in 1955, the Copa Juan Domingo Perón, organised by the body and the Government of Buenos Aires Province together. AFA included this competition (held only once) in its list of official domestic cups After this decision, Lanús totalised seven official titles through its history.

In 2025, Lanús won their second Copa Sudamericana title after defeating Brazilian side Atlético Mineiro 5–4 on kicks from the penalty mark following a 0–0 draw after extra time in the final. The following year, Lanús defeated Flamengo 4–2 on aggregate to win their first Recopa Sudamericana.

== Players ==
=== Current squad ===
As of 19 September 2026

Note: Flags indicate national team as defined under FIFA eligibility rules; some limited exceptions apply. Players may hold more than one non-FIFA nationality.

No.	Pos.	Nation	Player
1	GK	ARG	Franco Petroli
2	DF	ARG	Luciano Romero
3	DF	ARG	Nicolás Morgantini
4	DF	URU	Gonzalo Pérez
5	MF	ARG	Felipe Peña Biafore
6	DF	ARG	Sasha Marcich
8	MF	ARG	Franco Watson
10	MF	ARG	Marcelino Moreno
11	FW	ARG	Eduardo Salvio
13	DF	PAR	José Canale
15	MF	COL	Raúl Loaiza
16	MF	CHI	Matías Sepúlveda
17	MF	ARG	Agustín Medina
18	FW	ARG	Jeremías Chavero
19	FW	COL	Yoshan Valois

No.	Pos.	Nation	Player
20	FW	PAR	Allan Wlk
22	DF	ARG	Alexis González
23	MF	ARG	Ramiro Carrera
24	DF	ARG	Carlos Izquierdoz (captain)
26	GK	ARG	Nahuel Losada
27	MF	ARG	Facundo Sánchez
28	DF	ARG	Octavio Ontivero
30	MF	ARG	Agustín Cardozo
33	DF	ARG	Tomás Guidara
35	DF	PAR	Ronaldo Dejesús
37	FW	ARG	Thomás De Martis
38	FW	ARG	Benjamín Acosta
39	MF	ARG	Thiago Laplace
77	FW	ARG	Lucas Besozzi

=== Reserve squad ===
Note: Flags indicate national team as defined under FIFA eligibility rules; some limited exceptions apply. Players may hold more than one non-FIFA nationality.

No.	Pos.	Nation	Player
12	GK	ARG	Evaristo Dieguiz
14	DF	ARG	Mateo Ramírez
21	FW	PAR	Alexis Duarte
29	DF	ARG	Dante Blanco
31	GK	ARG	Martín Díaz
32	DF	ARG	Elián Acosta
33	DF	ARG	Tobías Quiroz
40	DF	ARG	Tomás López
41	FW	ARG	Thiago Balbuena

No.	Pos.	Nation	Player
43	MF	PAR	Gonzalo Lobos
44	FW	ARG	Mateo Peralta
45	GK	ARG	Tomás Silva
46	DF	ARG	Elías Prieto
47	MF	ARG	Juan Mujica
48	MF	ARG	Ian López
49	DF	ARG	Gabriel Aguirre
50	MF	ARG	Thiago Domínguez
51	DF	ARG	Sebastián Leiva

==== Out on loan ====
Note: Flags indicate national team as defined under FIFA eligibility rules; some limited exceptions apply. Players may hold more than one non-FIFA nationality.

No.	Pos.	Nation	Player
9	FW	ARG	Walter Bou (at O'Higgins until 31 December 2026)
12	GK	ARG	Nicolás Cláa (at Godoy Cruz until 31 December 2026)
17	GK	ARG	Lautaro Morales (at Universidad Central until 31 December 2026)
19	MF	ARG	Maximiliano González (at Deportivo Maldonado until 31 December 2026)
19	MF	ARG	Pity Rodríguez (at Rhode Island FC until 31 December 2026)
32	FW	ARG	Franco Orozco (at Newell's Old Boys until 31 December 2026)

No.	Pos.	Nation	Player
34	MF	ARG	Facundo Pérez (at AEL until 31 December 2026)
36	FW	ARG	Alexis Segovia (at Atlético Tucumán until 31 December 2026)
37	FW	ARG	Edwin Schulz (at Villa Dálmine until 31 December 2026)
—	FW	ARG	Bruno Cabrera (at San Martín de Tucumán until 31 December 2026)
—	MF	ARG	Mariano Gerez (at Marko until 30 June 2027)

== Player records ==
=== Most appearances ===
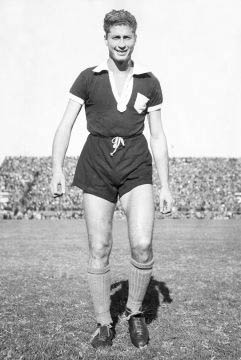
Héctor Guidi, one of Lanús' greatest idols, ranked 4th. in number of appearances for the club

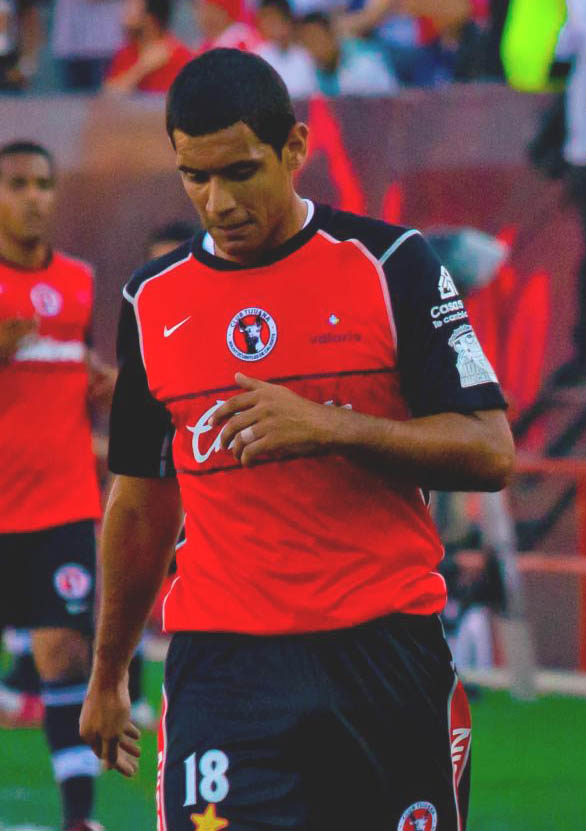
José Sand, all-time topscorer for C.A. Lanús

No.	Player	Pos.	Tenure	Match.
1	(Argentina) Maximiliano Velázquez	DF	2004–10, 2012–17	423
2	(Argentina) Lautaro Acosta	FW	2006–08, 2013–	381
3	(Argentina) José F. Perazzi	GK	1978–90	372
4	(Argentina) Héctor Guidi	MF	1949–61	328
5	(Argentina) José Sand	FW	2007–09, 2016–18, 2019–23	322

=== Top scorers ===
No.	Player	Pos.	Tenure	Goals
1	(Argentina) José Sand	FW	2007–09, 2016–18, 2019–23	173
2	(Argentina) Luis Arrieta	FW	1939–44	120
3	(Uruguay) Gilmar Villagrán	FW	1984–92	105
4	(Argentina) Ángel Silva	FW	1964–70	89
5	(Paraguay) Bernardo Acosta	FW	1962–68	84

=== Current coaching staff ===
Position	Staff
Head coach	(Argentina) Mauricio Pellegrino
Assistant coach	(Argentina) Carlos Compagnucci
Assistant coach	(Argentina) Turu Flores
Fitness coach	(Spain) Gabriel Macaya
Fitness coach	(Argentina) Leandro Pose
Goalkeeping coach	(Argentina) Marcos Fasanella
Video analyst	(Colombia) Sebastián Mardones
Video analyst	(Portugal) João Teixeira
Psychologist	(Argentina) Nadia Barbagallo

Last updated: 28 April 2025
Source: Cuerpo Técnico

== Coaches ==
- (Paraguay) Manuel Fleitas Solich (1932), (1937), (1946)
- (Argentina) Mario Fortunato (1950)
- (Argentina) Pedro Dellacha (1960s)
- (Argentina) Norberto Raffo (1975), (1979–80)
- (Argentina) Ricardo Trigilli (1985)
- (Argentina) Miguel Ángel Russo (1989–1993)
- (Argentina) Patricio Hernández (1994)
- (Argentina) Hector Cúper (1995–1997)
- (Argentina) Mario Gómez (1997–1999)
- (Argentina) Mario Zanabria (1999)
- (Argentina) Miguel Ángel Russo (1999–00)
- (Argentina) Héctor Veira (2000–01)
- (Argentina) Carlos Aimar (2001–02)
- (Argentina) Osvaldo Sosa (2002–03)
- (Argentina) Miguel Ángel Brindisi (2003–04)
- (Argentina) Carlos Ramacciotti (2004)
- (Argentina) Néstor Gorosito (2004–2005)
- (Argentina) Ramón Cabrero (2005–2008)
- (Argentina) Luis Zubeldía (2008–2010)
- (Argentina) Gabriel Schürrer (2011 –2012)
- (Argentina) Guillermo Barros Schelotto (2012–2015)
- (Argentina) Jorge Almirón (2016–2017)
- (Argentina) Ezequiel Carboni (2017–2018)
- (Argentina) Luis Zubeldía (2018–2021)

== Club statistics ==
- Seasons in Primera División: 67
- Seasons in Primera B Nacional: 19
- Seasons in Primera B Metropolitana: 3
- Highest league position: 1st (Apertura 2007, Campeonato 2016)
- Lowest league position: 20th
- Player with most goals scored: José Sand with 147 goals (2007–09; 2016–18; 2019–)
- Player with most matches played: Maximiliano Velázquez with 423 matches (2004–10; 2012–2017)
- Copa Libertadores played: 6 (2008, 2009, 2010, 2012, 2014, 2017)
- Copa Sudamericana played: 8 (2006, 2007, 2009, 2011, 2013, 2014, 2015, 2016)
- Copa CONMEBOL played: 3 (1994, 1996, 1997)

=== Biggest wins ===
- In Primera División: 9–0 v Quilmes (1935)
- In Primera B Nacional: 7–0 v Estudiantes (BA) (1975)
- In Primera B: 8–0 v General Lamadrid (1981)
- In international tournaments: 6–0 v Olimpia (2012 Copa Libertadores)

=== Biggest defeats ===
- In Primera División: 1–9 v Estudiantes (LP) (1935)
- In Primera B Nacional: 1–5 v Belgrano de Córdoba (1987)
- In Primera B: 2–6 v Deportivo Merlo (1981)
- In international tournaments: 0–4 v LDU Quito (2009 Copa Sudamericana)

== Honours ==
=== Senior titles ===
Keys

- Record

Type	Competition	Titles	Winning years
National (League)	Primera División	2	2007 Apertura, 2016
National (Cups)	Copa del Bicentenario	1	2016
National (Cups)	Supercopa Argentina	1	2016
National (Cups)	Copa Juan Domingo Perón	1	1955 (Note: Competition organised by the government of Buenos Aires province and held in 1955. It was contested by seven Primera División clubs. The AFA gave this title official status in October 2024.)
International	Copa Sudamericana	2	2013, 2025
International	Copa CONMEBOL	1	1996
International	Recopa Sudamericana	1	2026

=== Other titles ===
Titles won in lower divisions:

- Primera B Nacional (1): 1991–92
- Primera B (4): 1950, 1964, 1971, 1976–II
- Primera C (1): 1981

== Other sports ==
=== Basketball ===
Lanús currently plays in the Liga Nacional de Básquet, the top level of the Argentine league system.

==== Current roster ====
As of November 2024

Lanús basketball roster
Players
Coaches

Pos.	No.	Nat.	Name	Ht.	Age
SF	2	(Argentina)	Sacchi, Juan Cruz	1.99 m (6 ft 6 in)	25 – 15 February 2001
PG	3	(Argentina)	Alonso, Augusto	1.88 m (6 ft 2 in)	28 – 12 May 1998
SG	5	(Argentina)	Alonso, Manuel	1.90 m (6 ft 3 in)	28 – 6 April 1998
PG	6	(Argentina)	Gago, Mariano	1.80 m (5 ft 11 in)	25 – 6 April 2001
PG	8	(Argentina)	Sánchez, Alejo	1.85 m (6 ft 1 in)	21 – 5 October 2005
SG	10	(Argentina)	Sacchi, Alejo	1.94 m (6 ft 4 in)	22 – 30 December 2003
C	12	(Paraguay)	Páez, Junior	2.03 m (6 ft 8 in)	21 – 13 September 2005
C	15	(Argentina)	Chaine, Sebastián	2.06 m (6 ft 9 in)	39 – 16 December 1986
SF	19	(Argentina)	Ríos, Joaquín	1.94 m (6 ft 4 in)	31 – 19 November 1995
SG	28	(Argentina)	Moreno, Alan	1.83 m (6 ft 0 in)	29 – 4 July 1997
PF	32	(United States)	Dade, Matthew	1.98 m (6 ft 6 in)	25 – 11 April 2001

Head coach

- (Argentina) Sebastián Saborido

Assistant coach(es)

- (Argentina) Alejo Volpi

Legend

- (C) Team captain
- Injured

- Roster
Updated: November 2024
