= 1955 Copa Campeonato Juan Domingo Perón =

Copa Provincia de Buenos Aires Presidente Juan Domingo Perón
- Organiser(s): AFA; Buenos Aires Province
- Founded: 1955
- Abolished: 1955; 70 years ago
- Region: Buenos Aires Province
- Teams: 7
- Related competitions: Primera División
- Last champions: Lanús

The Copa Provincia de Buenos Aires Presidente Juan Domingo Perón (or simply Copa Campeonato Juan Domingo Perón or Copa Perón) was an official Argentine football cup competition

The championship was organized by the Argentine Football Association (AFA) and the Government of Buenos Aires Province. It was held as a special tournament preceding the official national championship in 1955. Lanús won the tournament (the first senior title of their history) after defeating Estudiantes (LP) in the final match.

Despite its provincial and regional origins, the tournament was officially recognized as a national competition by the Argentine Football Association (AFA) in 2024, following a formal request submitted by Club Atlético Lanús. The competition featured seven teams, comprising six from the Primera División and one from Primera B.

== Format ==
The participating teams competed in a heptagonal format, employing a direct elimination system followed by qualifying rounds for winners and losers.

In the first stage, due to an odd number of participating clubs, Tigre advanced directly to the subsequent round without competing. Club Atlético Lanús emerged victorious in the winners' bracket, while Club Estudiantes de Eva Perón ended up in the losers' zone.

The competition was contested by seven clubs, mostly of them located within the Buenos Aires Province region (with the exception of Chacarita Juniors) that were competing in Primera División in 1955. Independiente withdrew before the tournament started.

It was played under a single-elimination format, and like Copa Adrián C. Escobar, when a match ended in a tie after the overtime, the team with most corner kicks conceded was declared winner.

== Participating teams ==
| Club | City |
|---|---|
| Chacarita Juniors | Buenos Aires |
| Gimnasia y Esgrima (EP) (Note: Gimnasia y Esgrima La Plata had adopted the name "Gimnasia y Esgrima Eva Perón" in 1952. After the Revolución Libertadora of 1955, the club returned to its original name.) | Eva Perón (Note: The city of La Plata was named "Eva Perón" from 1952 to 1955.) |
| Estudiantes (LP) (Note: Unlike arch-rival Gimnasia y Esgrima (which had political sympathy with Peronism) Estudiantes never changed its name.) | Eva Perón |
| C.A. Banfield | Banfield |
| C.A. Lanús | Lanús |
| Racing Club | Avellaneda |
| Tigre | Victoria |

Notes

Club Atlético Independiente chose not to participate in the competition, citing prior commitments to a series of international friendly matches. The club was also impacted by the departure of several players who had been called up to represent the Argentina national team in the South American Championship held that same year.

== Tournament ==
Winners qualified to the winning teams round, while losers advanced to the losing teams round.

=== First round and winning teams round ===
In the first stage, due to an odd number of participating clubs, Club Atlético Tigre advanced directly to the subsequent round without competing. Club Atlético Lanús emerged victorious in the winners' bracket, while Club Estudiantes de Eva Perón ended up in the losers' zone.

First round (12 March)
Lanús (c) | 0 (1)
Racing | 0 (0)
Estudiantes (LP) (c) | 2 (1)
Banfield | 2 (0)
Chacarita Juniors | 2
Gimnasia y Esgrima (LP) | 1
Bye | –
Tigre | –

Winners round semifinals (2 December)
Lanús | 2
Estudiantes (LP) | 1
Tigre | 2
Chacarita Juniors | 0

Winners round final (1 April)
Lanús | 2
Tigre | 1

=== Losing teams round ===
First round (20 March)
Banfield | 2
Gimnasia y Esgrima (LP) | 1
Bye | –
Racing | –

2nd round losers (20 March)
Banfield | 2
Estudiantes (LP) | 3
Chacarita Juniors | 4 (1)
Racing (c) | 4 (2)

Semifinal losers (20 March)
Tigre | 2
Racing | 1

| Losing teams final (21 April) |
| Estudiantes (LP) | 4 |
| Tigre | 0 |

Estudiantes (LP) qualified to play the final v the winner of the winning teams round, Lanús

=== Final ===
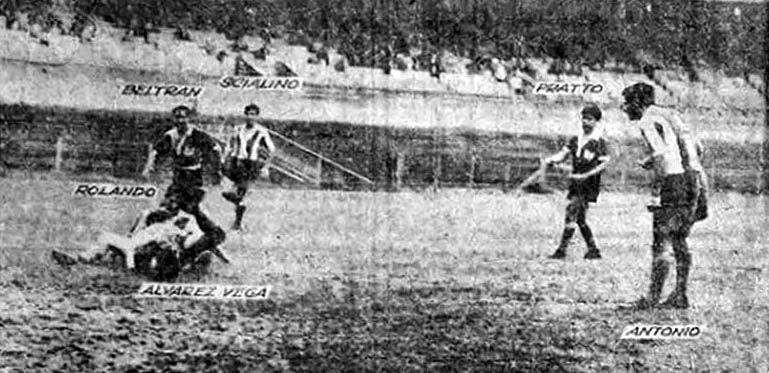
A moment of the match

The final was contested between Lanús and Estudiantes (LP) at a neutral venue selected by an AFA vote. The match took place at Estadio Presidente Perón, home stadium of Racing Club in Avellaneda, and was officiated by English referee Leslie Burfield.

24 April 1955

| Lanús | 2–1 | Estudiantes (LP) |
|---|---|---|
| García 70'; Gil 89' | Report | Urriolabeitía 72' |

Estadio Presidente Perón, Avellaneda
Referee: (England) Leslie Burfield

Lanús
Estudiantes (LP)

| GK | (Argentina) Enrique Alvarez Vega |
| DF | (Argentina) Emilio Pratto |
| DF | (Argentina) Angel Beltrán |
| MF | (Argentina) Nicolás Daponte |
| MF | (Argentina) Juan Héctor Guidi |
| MF | (Argentina) José Nazionale |
| FW | (Argentina) Oscar Contreras | (substituted off) a' |
| FW | (Argentina) Osvaldo Gil |
| FW | (Argentina) Rodolfo García |
| FW | (Argentina) Urbano Reynoso |
| FW | (Argentina) Felipe Zelada | (substituted off) b' |
Substitutions:
| FW | Emilio Fernandez | (substituted in) a' |
| FW | Ramón Moyano | (substituted in) b' |
Manager:
(Argentina) Juan B. Cevasco

| GK | (Argentina) Santos Gioffré |
| DF | (Argentina) Leandro Casanueva |
| DF | (Argentina) José María Silvero |
| MF | (Argentina) Walter Garcerón |
| MF | (Argentina) Juan Urriolabeitía |
| MF | (Argentina) Alberto Bouché |
| FW | (Argentina) Ricardo Scialino |
| FW | (Argentina) Francisco Quaglia |
| FW | (Argentina) Roberto Rolando |
| FW | (Argentina) Héctor Antonio | (substituted off) a' |
| FW | (Argentina) Manuel Pellegrina |
Substitutions:
| FW | Juan Chena | (substituted in) a' |
Manager:
(Argentina) ?

== Goal Scorers ==
| Player | Club | Goals |
|---|---|---|
| Rodolfo García | Lanús | 3 |
| Roberto Rolando | Estudiantes (LP) | 3 |
| Julio Ravelli | Chacarita Juniors | 3 |
| Benito Cejas | Lanús | 2 |
| Oreste Corbatta | Racing | 2 |
| Osvaldo Gil | Lanús | 1 |
| Manuel Pelegrina | Estudiantes (LP) | 1 |

Source: RSSSF

== Aftermath ==
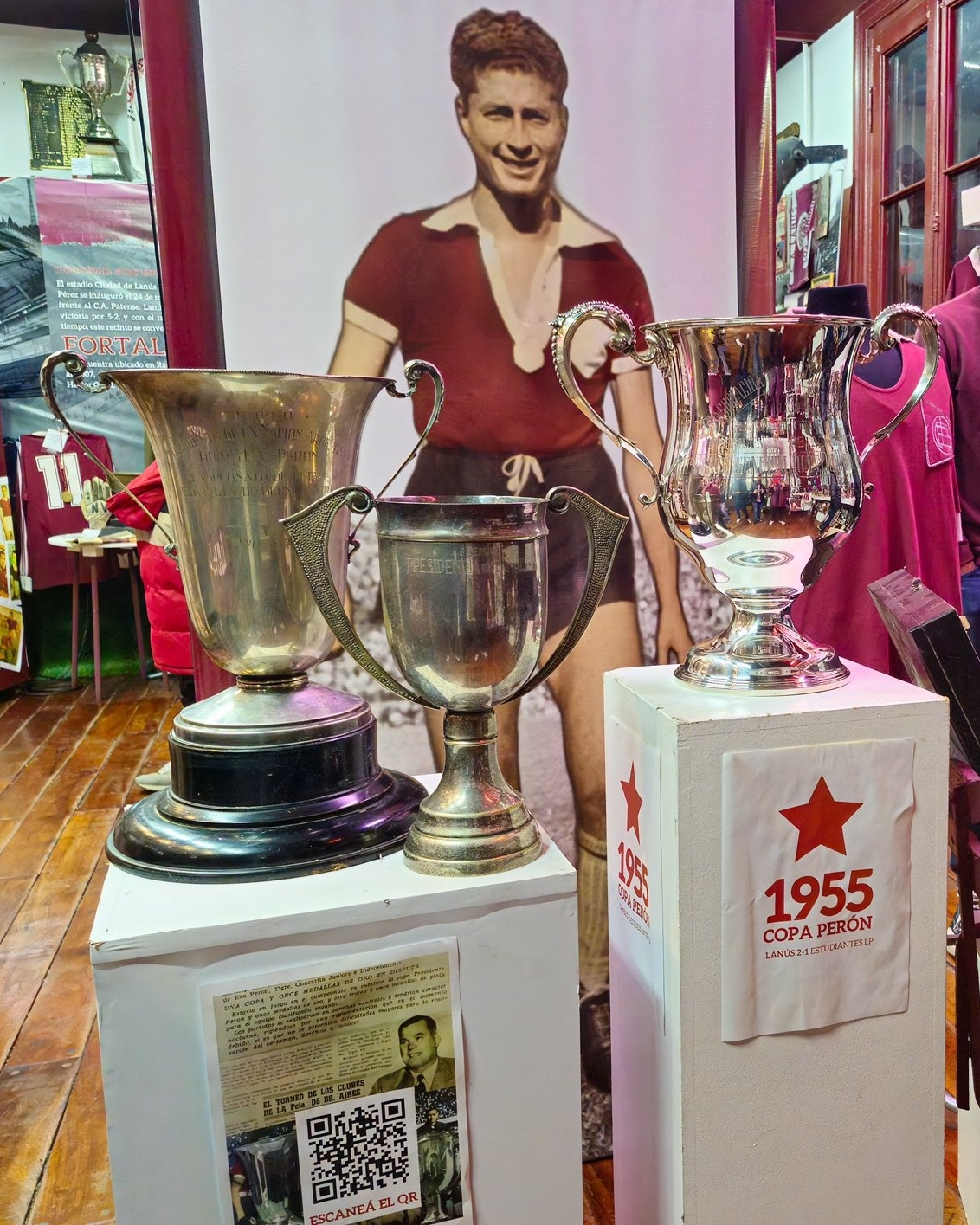
The trophies displayed at C.A. Lanús Museum in 2024: at left, the two cups awarded by Buenos Aires province; at right, the cup awarded by AFA

The Campeonato de la Provincia de Buenos Aires was a pre-season football tournament organized by the government of Buenos Aires Province and announced by the Argentine Football Association (AFA) prior to the start of the 1955 Primera División season. The winning team was awarded three trophies: one presented by the provincial government and two by the AFA. One of the AFA trophies remained in the possession of Club Atlético Lanús, while the other was retained in the association's displays.

The winner should have been awarded three trophies, two by AFA and one by the province. Nevertheless and due to the 1955 coup d'etat that ended the second presidential term of Juan Perón, Lanús was not awarded the cup because the military government had appointed an interventor at the association. AFA did not officialise the title until October 2024, claiming their 7th. senior title.

Nearly seven decades later, in 2024, the AFA retroactively granted official recognition to the tournament, a decision that generated criticism and controversy. Despite the fact that the tournament had originally been referenced in AFA bulletins for the 1955 season as part of the “special tournaments” category and not listed among official competitions, the governing body acknowledged it as an official title.

Researchers and historians have criticized the AFA’s decision to grant official status to the tournament, arguing that "there is no logical historical coherence" in recognizing a competition of provincial character as a national title.

In January 2025, the title was finally made official in AFA's Annual Club Report 2024 and in the list of champions on its website as a national title.
