= Club El Porvenir =

Argentine football club

El Porvenir
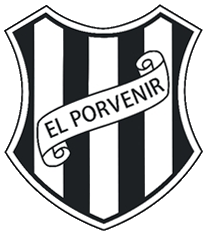
- Full name: Club El Porvenir
- Nickname: Porve
- Founded: 15 September 1915; 111 years ago
- Ground: Estadio Gildo Francisco Ghersinich, Gerli, Greater Buenos Aires, Argentina
- Capacity: 14,000
- Chairman: (Argentina) Enrique Mérelas
- Manager: (Argentina) Cristián Ferlauto
- League: Primera C
- 2024: 16th.
Home colours	Away colours

Club El Porvenir is an Argentine football club headquartered in the Gerli district of Lanús Partido in Greater Buenos Aires. The team currently plays in Primera C, the regionalised fourth division of the Argentine football league system.

== History ==
The club was established on 15 September 1915 in Villa Porvenir, Avellaneda Partido, primarily as a Greco-Roman wrestling club. The football team debuted in official tournaments in 1918, playing its home games at the Club "Sígame Si Puede" ("Follow me if You can", in Spanish, current Sportivo Dock Sud).

In 1919 El Porvenir acquired the field where its first stadium would be built, winning the title that allowed the squad to promote to the "intermedia" (second) division, current Primera B, one year later, therefore promoting to the Primera División, the top division of Argentine league system. After its first season in Primera División, El Porvenir finished 5° in the 1921 championship.

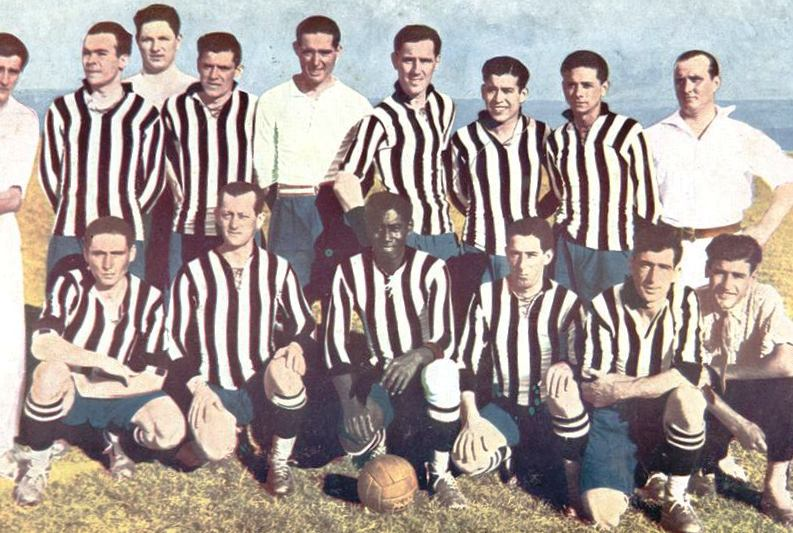
The team that won the Primera B title in 1927, promoting to Primera

Nevertheless, after the 15° fixture of the 1926 season, El Porvenir lost affiliation to the body, along with All Boys, Colegiales, Nueva Chicago, Temperley and Sportivo Barracas. One year later, El Porvenir won the Primera B title and returned to Primera. When football became professional in Argentina in 1931, El Porvenir remained in the official amateur association, making its best performance in 1934 when the squad finished 5° of 23 teams. However, El Porvenir would be relegated again when both associations, the amateur and dissident Liga Argentina de Football merged to form a unique body.

El Porvenir won another title, the Primera C championship, in 1954. The squad achieved another title in 1997–98 when winning the Primera B Metropolitana championship, therefore promoting to Primera B Nacional, the second division of Argentine football.

== Stadiums ==
During the decade of 1920, El Porvenir rented several fields until it inaugurated its own one, in Lanús, where the team played until 1939. The first international match played by El Porvenir was on 12 October 1920, against Uruguayan team Liga Nacional de Montevideo. In 1941 the club was disaffiliated by the Association due to it did not have a field, so El Porvenir began to build an stadium in Gerli, Lanús Partido. The stadium was opened on 4 April 1942, then enlarged in 1943 to host 10,000 spectators. This venue was used until 1968.

The current stadium was erected in lands donated by the Government of Argentina and was inaugurated on 24 April 1971. The first match played there was against defunct club Defensores de Almagro, which ended 1–1.

== Players ==
=== Current squad ===
Note: Flags indicate national team as defined under FIFA eligibility rules; some limited exceptions apply. Players may hold more than one non-FIFA nationality.

No.	Pos.	Nation	Player
—	GK	ARG	Ignacio Viain
—	GK	ARG	Hector Ezequiel Velazquez
—	DF	ARG	Patricio Grgona
—	DF	ARG	Jonathan Caprarullo
—	DF	ARG	Emanuel Russo
—	DF	ARG	Iván Zafarana
—	DF	ARG	Damián Galván
—	DF	ARG	Walter Zunino
—	DF	ARG	Guillermo Báez
—	DF	ARG	Hernán Pereira
—	MF	ARG	Lucas Miguens

No.	Pos.	Nation	Player
—	MF	ARG	Nicolás Marquevich
—	MF	ARG	Hugo Palmerola
—	MF	ARG	Román Martinangeli
—	MF	ARG	Ciro Campuzano
—	MF	ARG	Sergio Meza Sánchez
—	FW	ARG	Guillermo Carrizo
—	FW	ARG	Lucas Barrientos Aguilera
—	FW	ARG	Guillermo Correa
—	FW	ARG	Matías Mansilla
—	FW	ARG	Jonatan Irala
—	FW	ARG	Gustavo Azcona

== Notable former managers ==
- (Argentina) José Basualdo (2006)
- (Argentina) Norberto Raffo (1978–79)

== Titles ==
- División Intermedia (1): 1920
- Primera B (2): 1927, 1997–98
- Primera C (2): 1943, 1954
- Primera D (1): 2016
