= Monte Chingolo =

Town in Buenos Aires Province, Argentina

- Town
- Location in Greater Buenos Aires
- Coordinates: 34°44′S 58°21′W
- Country: Argentina
- Province: Buenos Aires
- Partido: Lanús
- Founded: 23 November 1815
- Elevation: 9 m (30 ft)

Population (2001 census [INDEC])
  - Total: 85,060
- CPA Base: B 1825
- Area code: +54 11

Monte Chingolo is a town in Buenos Aires Province, Argentina. Located in Lanús Partido in the south of the Greater Buenos Aires metropolitan area.

== History ==
Monte Chingolo was founded on 23 November 1815 by Juan Manuel de Rosas. The settlement was the site of Las Higueritas, the first recorded abattoir in Argentina. The town grew following the opening of a Ferrocarril Provincial de Buenos Aires station in 1927, and it became the site of numerous abattoirs and other industrial establishments.

The Battalion 601 Arsenal at Monte Chingolo was besieged on 23 December 1975 by the ERP, a Trotskyite guerrilla group. The attack left over 100 dead, and the ERP's defeat largely subdued the organization.

The city later suffered from the effects of a failed plan during the 1976-83 dictatorship to expand the General Paz Freeway from the Villa Riachuelo ward in Buenos Aires to the city of Avellaneda; never completed, the demolitions resulting from the project left an extensive swath along the city of empty lots which, in many cases, were not adequately reurbanized.
