= Gerli =

- Town
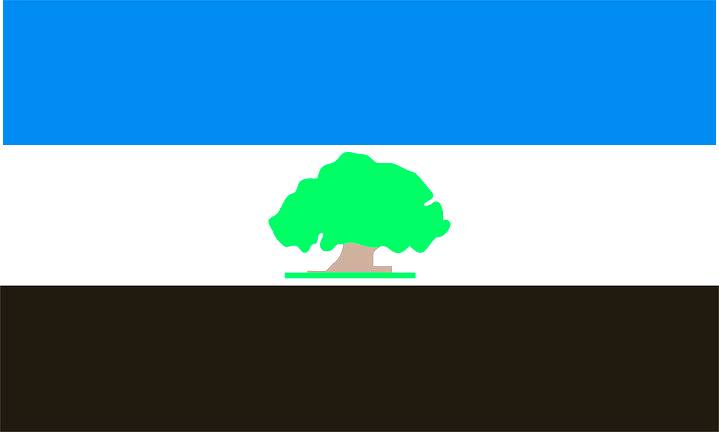
- Flag

- Location in Greater Buenos Aires
- Coordinates: 34°41′S 58°22′W
- Country: Argentina
- Province: Buenos Aires
- Partido: Avellaneda and Lanús
- Founded: March 30, 1909
- Elevation: 6 m (20 ft)

Population (2001 census [INDEC])
  - Total: 64,640
  - Density: 9,151/km^{2} (23,700/sq mi)
- CPA Base: B 1870
- Area code: +54 11

Gerli is a town in Buenos Aires Province, Argentina. It lies in the partidos of Avellaneda and Lanús and forms part of the Greater Buenos Aires urban agglomeration.

== History ==
- 30 March 1909: The settlement was officially established on territory owned by Antonio Gerli.
- 1944: Gerli was divided by the creation of the Lanús Partido.
- 11 November 2005: Gerli was officially declared a municipality by the Legislature of Buenos Aires Province.

== Population ==
Gerli had a population of 64,640 inhabitants 2001 census [INDEC], 31,090 in Avellaneda and 33,250 in Lanús.

== Sport ==
The town is home to Club El Porvenir a football club who play in the lower leagues of Argentine football.

== Neighbourhoods ==
- Barrio 15 de Noviembre (1969)
- Barrio Agüero (1958)
- Barrio La Maquinita (1965)
- Barrio Obrero Nº 2 (1950)
- Barrio Unidad y Lucha (1985)
- Gerli Este
- Gerli Oeste (1916)
- La Mosca (1930)
- Villa Angélica (1910)
- Villa Argentina (1913)
- Villa Armandina (1922)
- Villa Aurora (1908)
- Villa Calcagnino (1913)
- Villa Campomar (1929)
- Villa Dorado (1916)
- Villa Echenagucía (1894)
- Villa Fischer (1900)
- Villa Garbarino (1906)
- Villa Heredia (1915)
- Villa Hunter (1926)
- Villa Ideal (1912)
- Villa Iris (1913)
- Villa Isabel (1912)
- Villa Kilómetro 5 (1925)
- Villa Mailhos (1927)
- Villa Marconi (1938)
- Villa Mercado (1924)
- Villa Modelo (1914)
- Villa Moss (1910)
- Villa Otamendi (1930)
- Villa Oyuela (1925)
- Villa San Martín (1924)
- Villa Sapito (1960)
- Villa Sarmiento (1945)
