= Buenos Aires Midland Railway =

Railway company in Argentina, 1909–1948

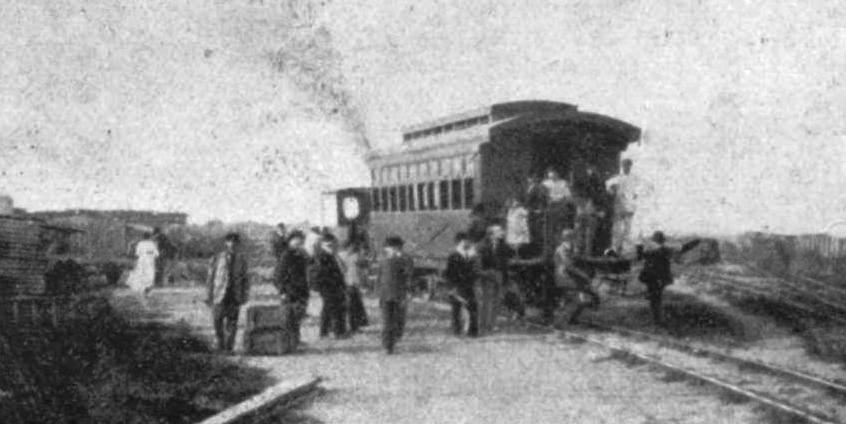
- A train in the Puente Alsina-Puente de la Noria section, 1908.

Overview
- Native name: Ferrocarril Midland
- Status: Company defunct; Puente Alsina-Marinos del Crucero General Belgrano branch currently operated by Trenes Argentinos.
- Locale: Buenos Aires Province
- Termini: Puente Alsina; Carhué

Service
- Type: Regional rail
- Services: 1

History
- Opened: 1909
- Closed: 1948

Technical
- Track length: 517 km (321 mi)
- Track gauge: 1,000 mm (3 ft 3 3/8 in)
Route map
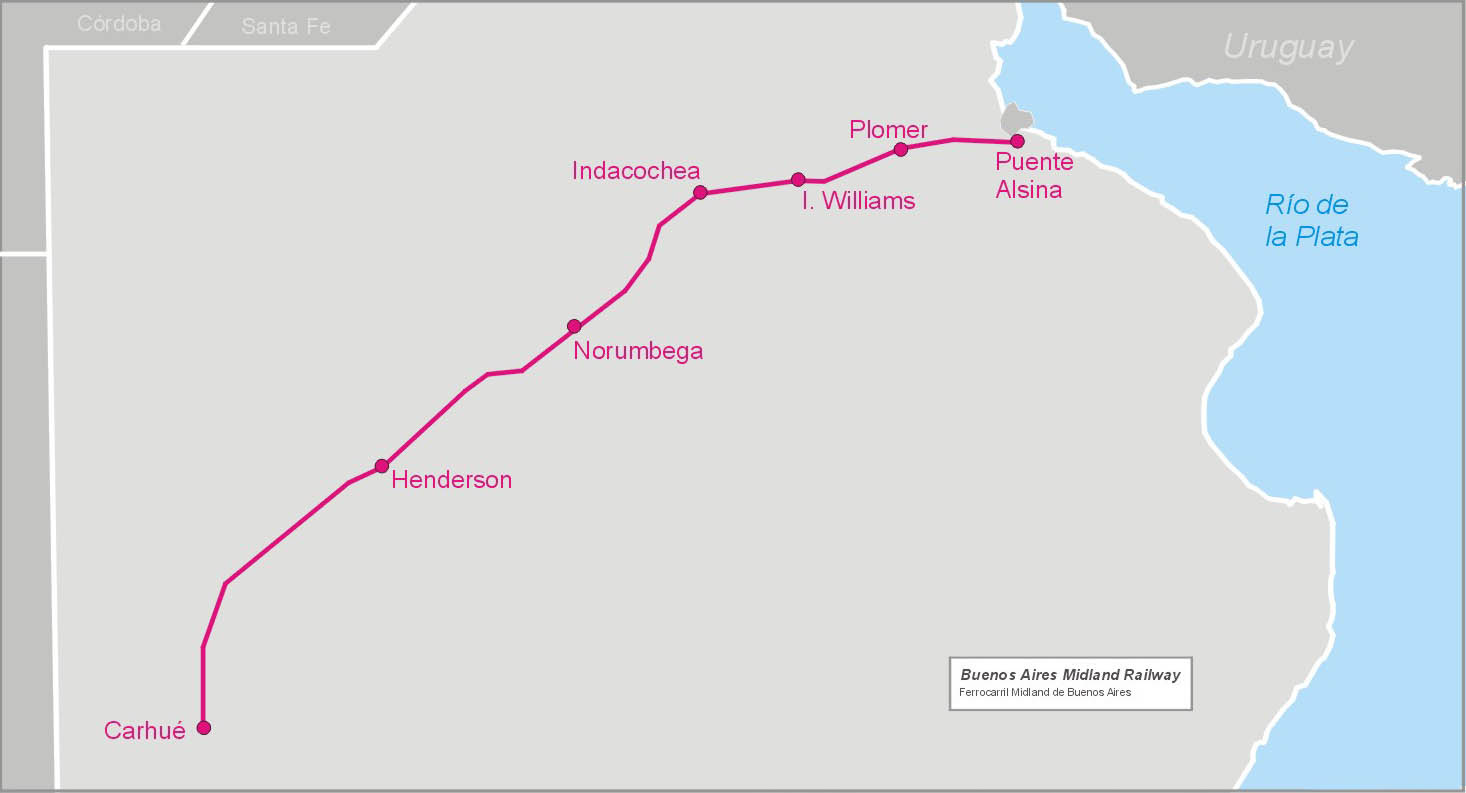

The Buenos Aires Midland Railway (BAM) was a British-owned railway company which operated in Argentina, where it was known as Ferrocarril Midland de Buenos Aires. The company built and operated the 1,000 mm (3 ft 3 3/8 in) gauge (metre gauge) line between Puente Alsina and Carhué in Buenos Aires Province.

After the railway nationalisation in Argentina in 1948, the BAM became part of Belgrano Sur Line, the company closing as a result. Today services on the line are operated by the state-owned company Trenes Argentinos, the concessionary of Puente Alsina-Marinos del Crucero General Belgrano branch.

== History ==
=== Background ===
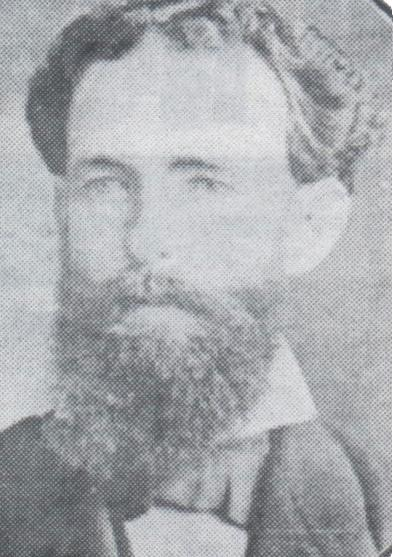
Eduardo Casey

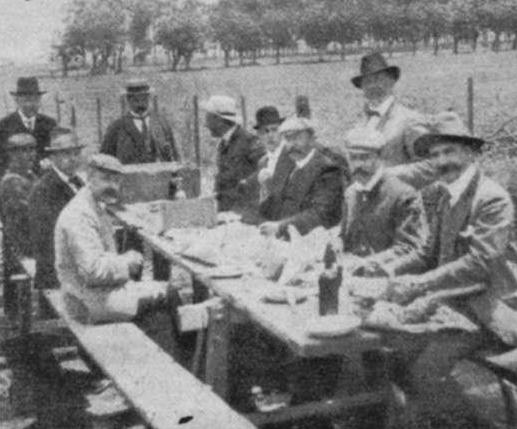
Lunch held at Puente Alsina to celebrate the opening of the line to passengers, 1908.

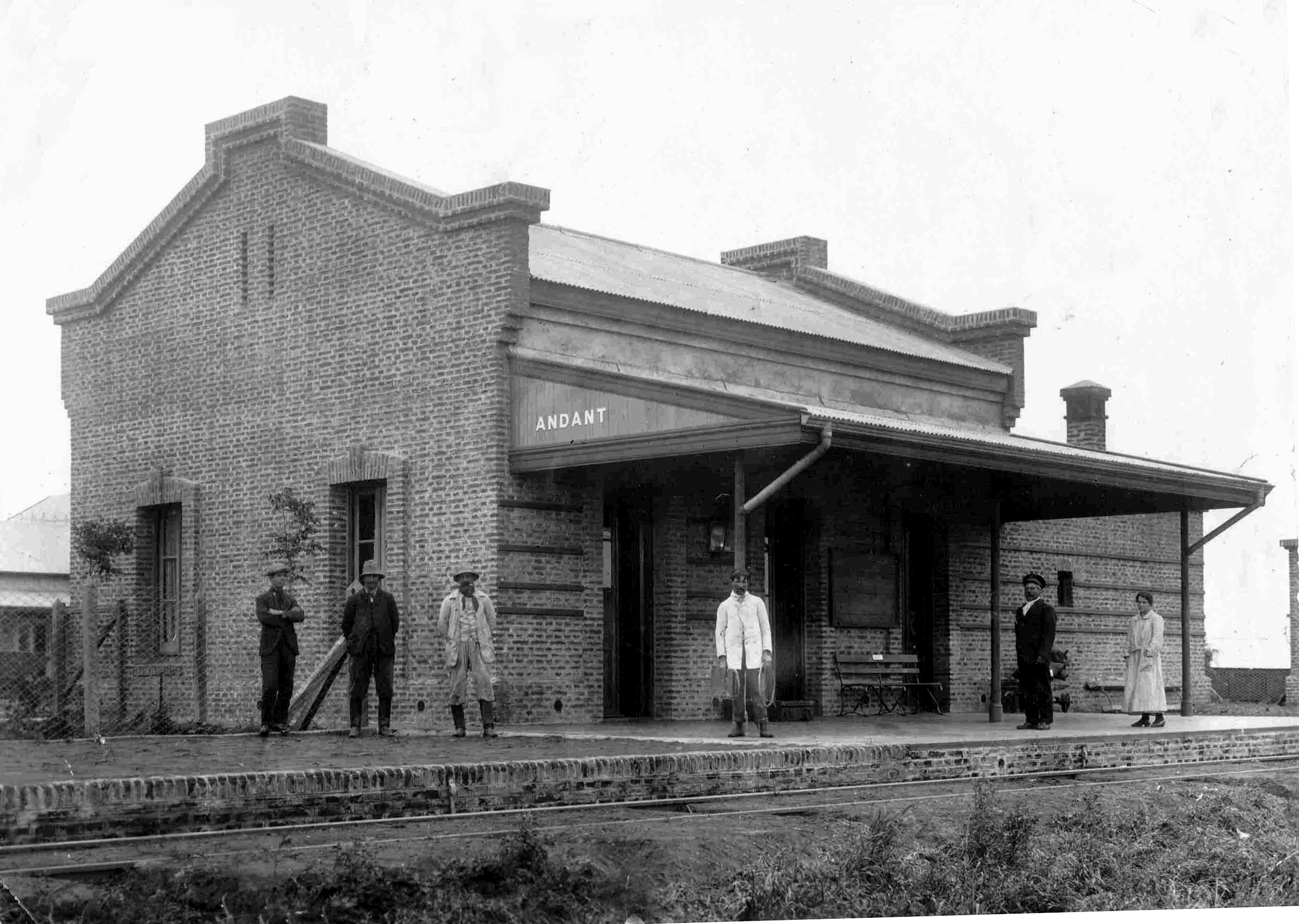
Andant station, c. 1900

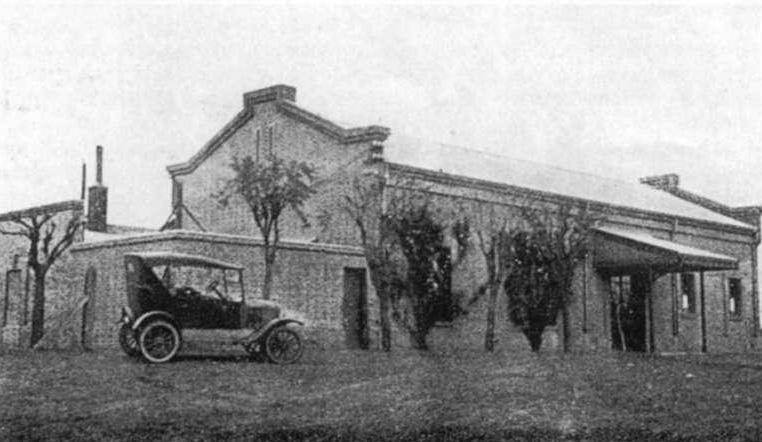
Henderson station, 1920.

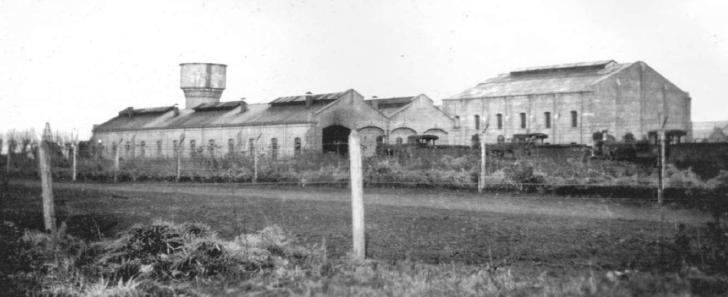
Workshops at Libertad, Buenos Aires Province, 1926.

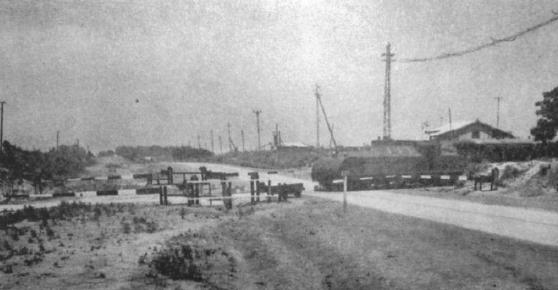
Level crossing barriers near Isidro Casanova, 1939.

In 1904, the Buenos Aires Province granted entrepreneur Enrique Lavalle a concession to build a metre gauge railway line between Puente Alsina and Carhué. The company and line were named "Buenos Aires Midland Railway", so the Lacroze Brothers registered the Spanish form "Ferrocarril Central de Buenos Aires". Works were led by ideologue Eduardo Casey, who had founded the city of Venado Tuerto some time before.

=== Development ===
Construction of the line began in 1907, with works carried out by Argentine company Hume Hnos. By November that year the line had extended to Puente de la Noria (now Ingeniero Budge station). The service was operated initially using a Koppel steam locomotive and a unique coach.

The BAM soon entered into conflict with the French-owned company, Compañía General de Ferrocarriles en la Provincia de Buenos Aires (CGBA), which was also building railways in the same part of the Province, a situation with potential to bankrupt both BAM and CGBA. The legal situation was also complicated: while National Law 2.793 gave priority to the company that had been granted concession first, BAM in this case, the concession granted to BAM had been given by a Province; therefore the CGBA also had rights to claim.

Both companies initially continued expanding their lines across the Province, the conflict reaching such a stage that BAM asked CGBA to cease construction work, while CGBA threatened to take the case to the Supreme Court of Justice. Eventually an understanding was reached between the two companies, establishing joint use of Plomer station, among other issues. The BAM lost several embankments because of the deal, so the company requested financial compensation, alleging that they had invested too much money in the construction.

In mid 1908, works had to be suspended as the company was unable to raise capital from Europe. Other companies such as Great Southern and Western Railways took over BAM and committed to finish the line. Some of the changes made by the consortium were the replacement of contractor Hume Hnos by Clarke, Bradbury and Co. (owned by Great Southern's manager's brother). The Puente Alsina - San Sebastián section was finally opened on 15 June 1909, the complete line to Carhué opening on 1 July 1911.

As the BAM line terminated at Puente Alsina, the company could not reach the capital city of Buenos Aires, which was part of its strategy to increase business. Extending the line to the capital was not legally possible, since the concession had been granted by a Provincial body and the capital city was under the jurisdiction of the National Government. In 1912, an agreement was signed with the Western Railway, which opened a station (named Intercambio Midland) that allowed Midland railway passengers to change for Western Railway trains to Sola station in the Parque Patricios district of Buenos Aires. However, this situation did not last long, Puente Alsina becoming the terminus again soon after.

=== Steam locomotives ===
The first locomotive was a 21-ton class A built by Vulcan Iron Works. The second one was the Orenstein & Koppel locomotive that made the first trip from Puente Alsina to Puenta La Noria. The latter is now exhibited at the Once railway station in Buenos Aires, while some accounts state that it was sold in 1913 is currently exhibited at a Brazilian museum. Another early locomotive was a Kerr, Stuart and Company, manufactured in 1901 exclusively for the Government of Argentina, and sold in 1935 to another company in Buenos Aires Province. Another Kerr, Stuart machine was used on short trips until the 1930s.

Once the entire line had been inaugurated, the company acquired six Kerr, Stuart class Es that served until 1948 when the railway was nationalised, at which time these locomotives were sold. The company bought 20 class Fs by the same company, which were operated until the 1970s (latterly by Ferrocarriles Argentinos).

The BA Midland also used Hunslet class G locomotives until they were replaced by railcars in 1939, being cascaded to other services. The Beyer Peacock H class locomotives proved too big for the line, and were hired to Ferrocarril Santa Fe and other companies. Sentinel-Cammell locomotives, constructed jointly by Sentinel Waggon Works and Metro-Cammell, operated suburban services on the main line.

=== Modernisation: railcars ===
By 1936, railways in Argentina faced increasing competition from road transport. Some British owned companies (such as Great Southern Railway) responded by acquiring railcars from Drewry Car Co. By this time, BAM carried very few passengers, and was losing money. In order to increase the number of passengers carried and to compete against Southern, Western and GCBA railways, BAM acquired 10 railcars from Birmingham Railway Carriage & Wagon Company, powered with Gardner engines. The railcars entered service on 1 January 1939, replacing old steam locomotives on all services passenger. The railcars reduced the journey time to Carhué to 8 hours; the same journey took 14 hours on the Great Southern Railway.

=== Nationalisation ===
When the entire Argentine railway network was nationalised in 1948 during Juan Perón's presidency, the BAM line became part of Belgrano Railway, one of the six divisions of State-owned company Ferrocarriles Argentinos.

== Gallery ==
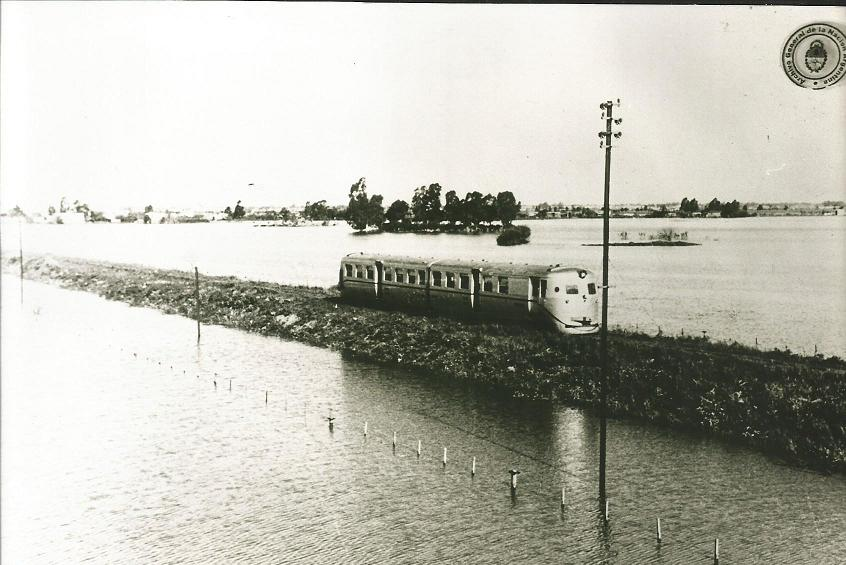
BRCW railcar in the flood, 1939

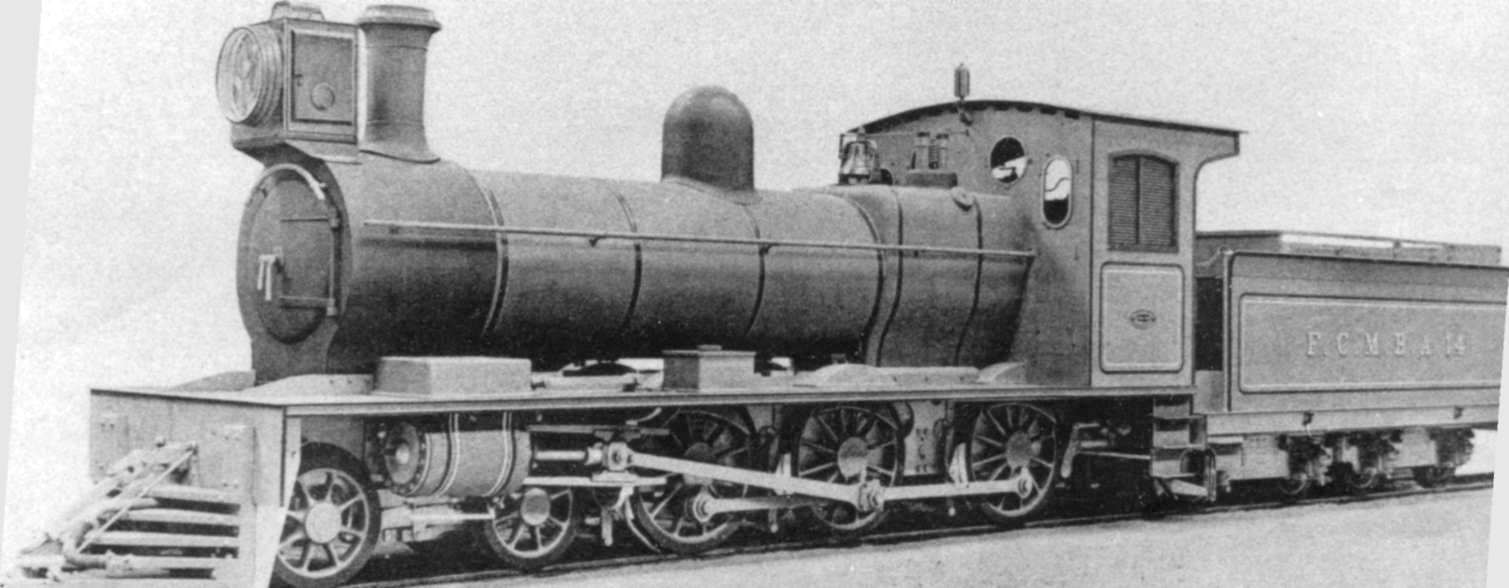
Kerr, Stuart and Company Class E, 1930

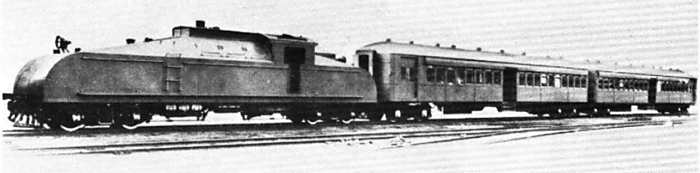
Sentinel-Cammell locomotive, 1930

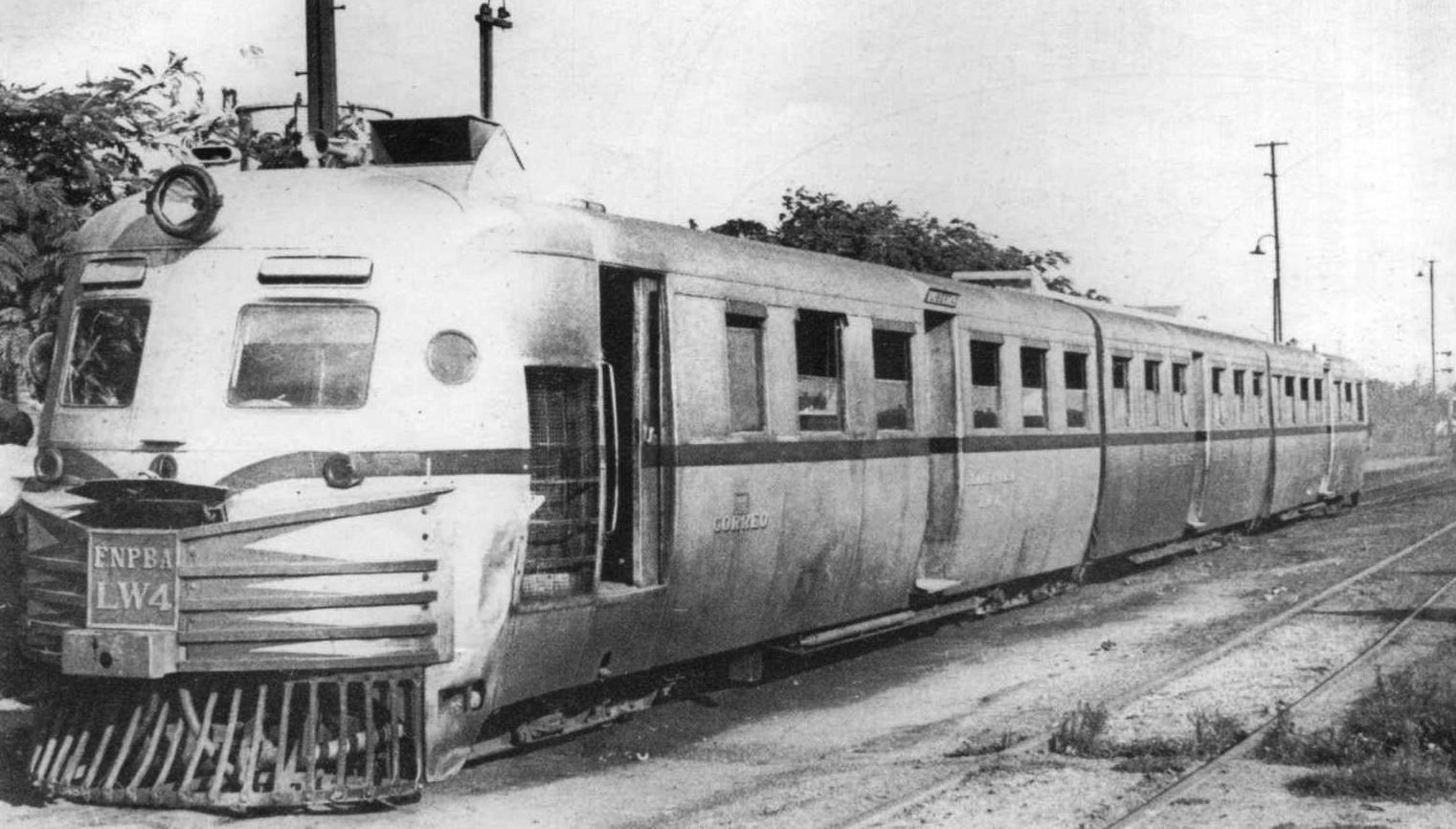
BRCW railcar

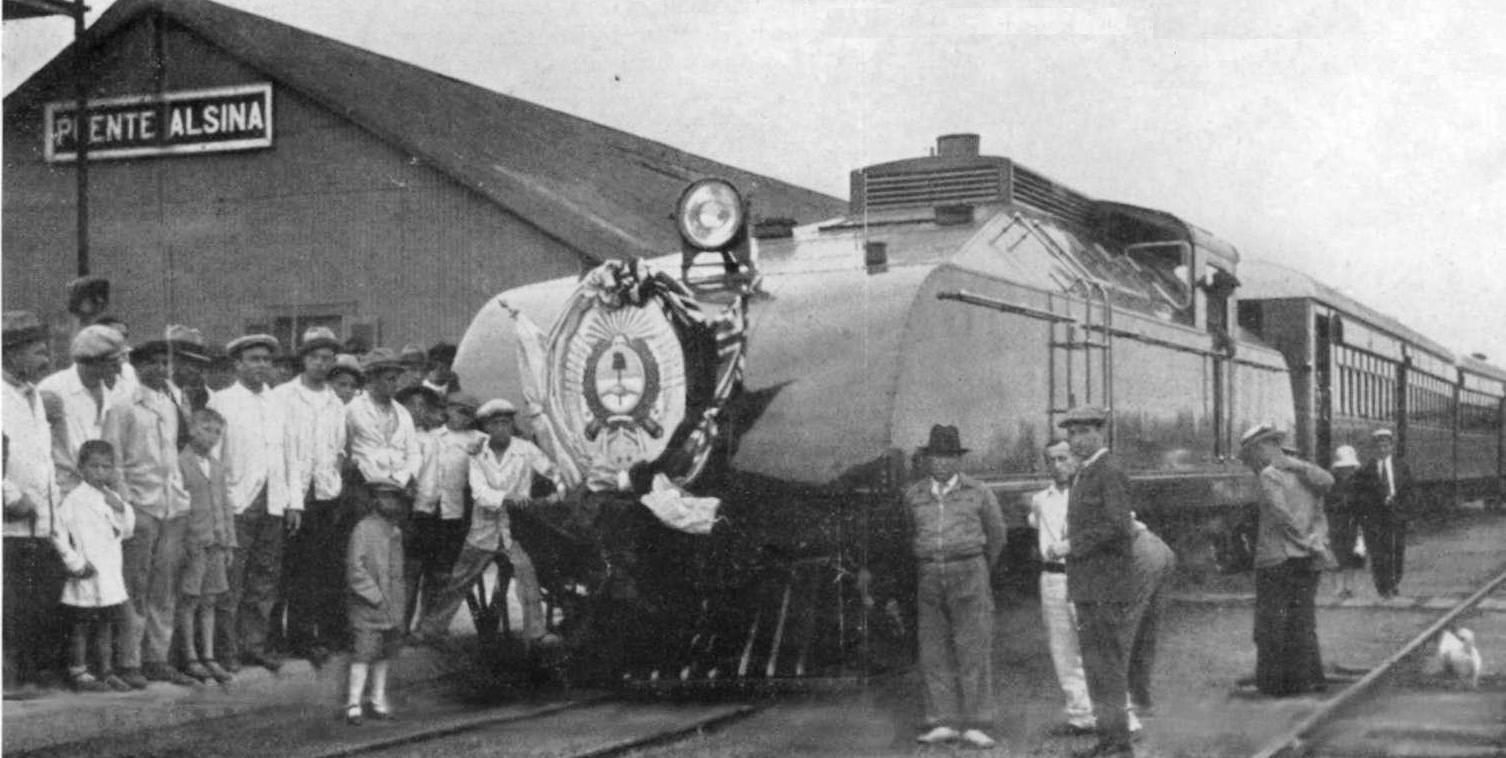
Sentinel-Cammell locomotive in Puente Alsina, 1932

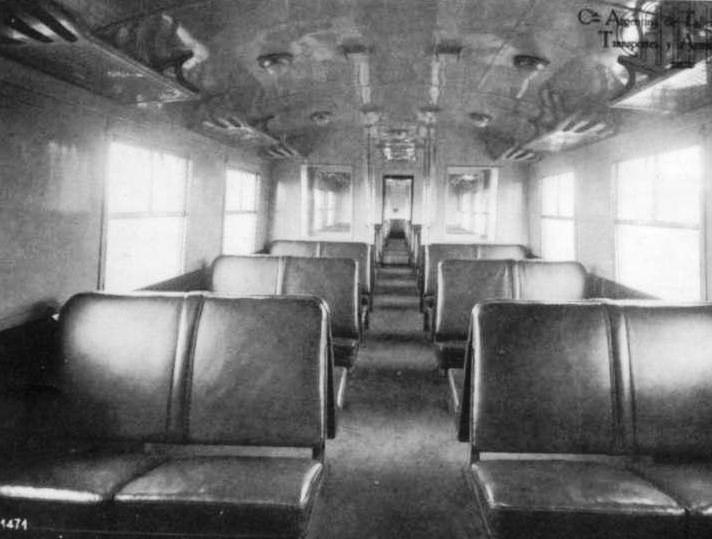
Interior of a BRCW railcar, 1941

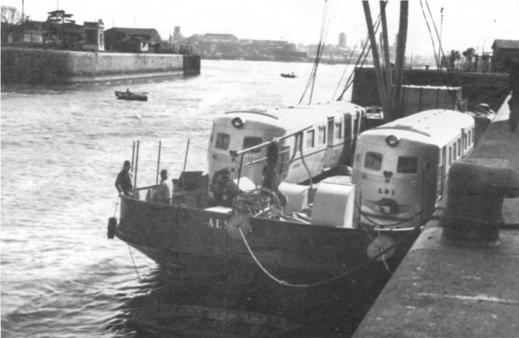
BRCW railcars in Dock Sud, 1937

== See also ==
- Rail transport in Argentina
- General Belgrano Railway
- Belgrano Sur Line
