= Lanús Partido =

Lanús Partido de Lanús
- Department
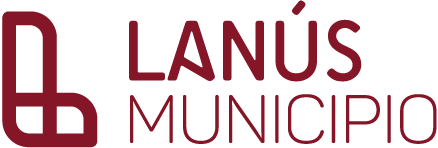

- location of Lanús Partido in Gran Buenos Aires
- Coordinates: 34°42′S 58°24′W
- Country: Argentina
- Established: January 1, 1945
- Founder: provincial law
- Seat: Lanús

Government
  - Intendant: Julián Álvarez (Homeland Force)

Area
  - Total: 45 km^{2} (17 sq mi)

Population
  - Total: 453,500
  - Density: 10,000/km^{2} (26,000/sq mi)
- Demonym: lanusense
- Postal Code: B1824
- IFAM: BUE067
- Area Code: 011
- Patron saint: Santa Teresa de Jesus
- Website: www.lanus.gob.ar

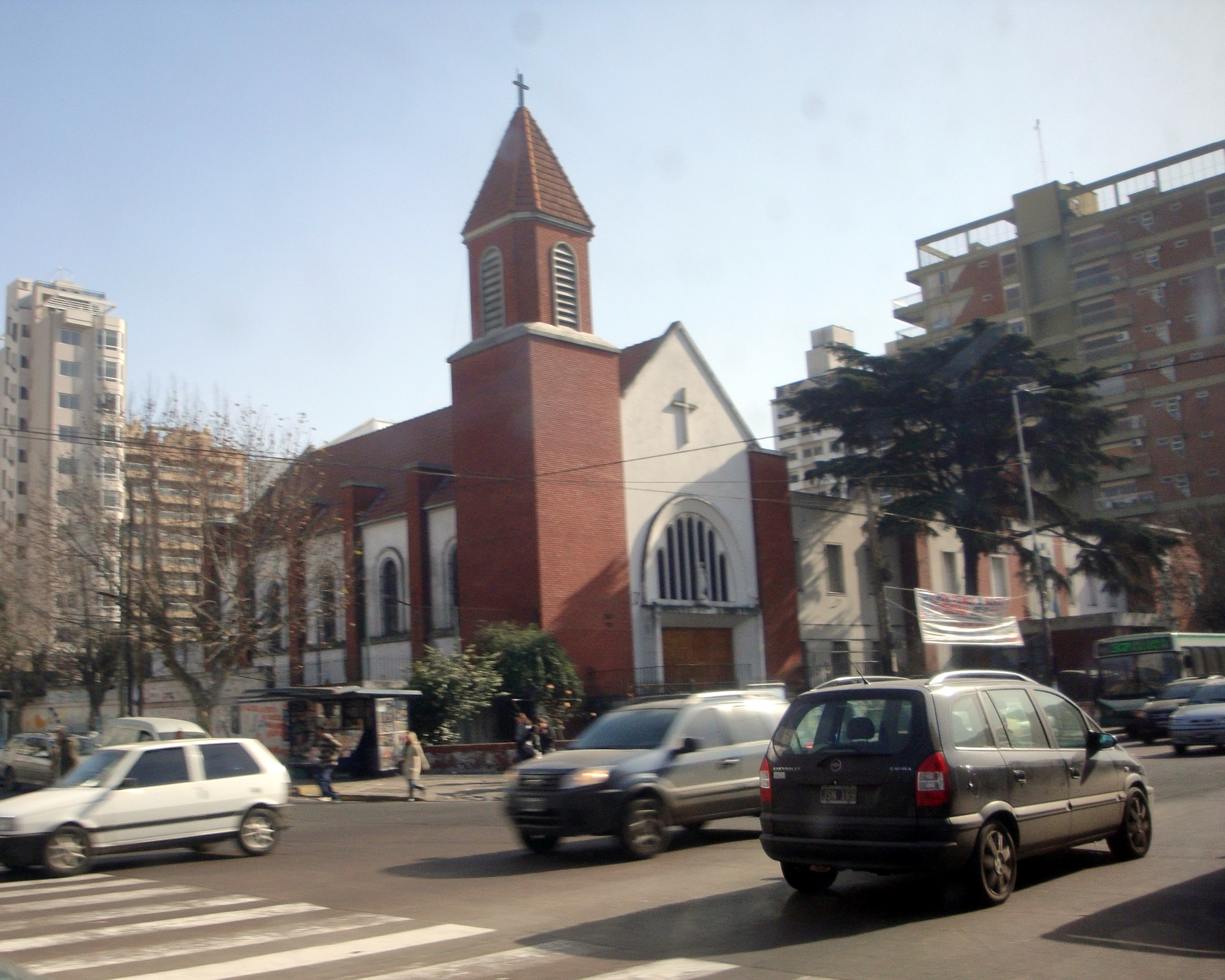
The main avenue, Hipólito Yrigoyen, in Lanús district.

Lanús is a partido in Buenos Aires Province, Argentina, at the south of the Gran Buenos Aires urban conglomerate neighbouring Buenos Aires city.

The partido has an area of 45 km^{2} (17 sq mi), and a population of 453,500 (2010 census [INDEC]). Its capital is the city of Lanús.

Lanús Partido is connected to the Buenos Aires city across the Valentín Alsina Bridge over the Riachuelo River. The name of the partido comes from the former land owner Anacarsis Lanús, who was a pioneer in the urbanization of the area.

== Sports ==
The partido is home to Club Atlético Lanús, a football club playing in the Argentine Primera Division.

== Districts ==
- Gerli
- Lanús (sometimes subdivided into Lanús Este and Lanús Oeste)
- Monte Chingolo
- Remedios de Escalada
- Valentín Alsina
