= 1975 Monte Chingolo attack =

Guerilla attack in Argentina's Dirty War

- Part of the Dirty War
Date	23–24 December 1975
Location	601st Arsenal Battalion headquarters, Monte Chingolo, Buenos Aires
Result	Argentine Army victory: ERP is largely subdued

Belligerents
People's Revolutionary Army	Argentina

Commanders and leaders
Benito Urteaga; Abigail Attademo	(Argentina) Eduardo Abud (Argentina) Roberto Barczuk (Argentina) Adolfo Sigwald (Argentina) Guillermo Ezcurra (WIA)

Units involved
José de San Martín Urban Battalion	1st Infantry Regiment; 3rd Infantry Regiment; 7th Infantry Regiment; 601st Communications Battalion

Strength
~300 fighters	5 jet fighters 15 helicopters

Casualties and losses
62 killed 25 wounded	6–10 killed 34 wounded
- ~30 ERP fighters summarily executed (executed)

On 23 December 1975, in what would be its last significant military action, the People's Revolutionary Army (ERP), an Argentine Marxist–Leninist guerrilla, launched an assault on the 601st Arsenal Battalion, the largest in the country, in the city of Monte Chingolo, 14 km from Buenos Aires. The attack was aimed at capturing 13 tons of weaponry: 900 FN FAL rifles with 60,000 magazines, 100 M16 rifles with 100,000 magazines, six 20 mm anti-aircraft cannons, 15 recoilless guns, 150 submachine guns and Ithaca M37 shotguns. The assault had been planned since August 1975, and the attackers gained access to the compound with the help of an infiltrated guerrilla posing as a soldier.

== Background ==
Unbeknownst to the ERP, Rafael Jesús de Ranier, a former member of the Peronist Armed Forces left-wing group who had defected during the early stages of Operativo Independencia and turned spy for the military, had been providing valuable intelligence data to the Army throughout 1975. The commander of the ERP's logistic section, Juan Eliseo Ledesma, was arrested on 7 December, and his deputy Elías Abdón on 11 December. Based on information extracted under torture from Abdón, the military learned that a major attack was to take place somewhere in the Greater Buenos Aires, correctly calculating that, in dire need of weaponry, the ERP would target an arsenal depot, with Monte Chingolo being the most obvious option. Santucho, however, refused to cancel the operation and his forces, having lost the surprise factor, were promptly defeated by a well-prepared Argentine Army.

== Assault ==
At 19:00, the José de San Martín Urban Battalion, reinforced by 30 to 40 Communist fighters newly arrived from Tucumán province, began the operation by blocking the nine bridges that connect the city of Buenos Aires proper with its conurbation area. The Quilmes, Avellaneda and Lomas de Zamora police brigades came under ERP attack, as did the 7th Infantry Regiment in La Plata and the 601st Communications Battalion at City Bell. Fierce fighting took place at a number of these locations, such as Pasco Avenue and La Noria bridge, where it was reported that around 30 ERP snipers fired upon the local police station. A poorly armed ERP squad crowded several cars on a bridge over the Matanza River and spilled diesel fuel from a tanker truck, setting it on fire. Elsewhere, 15 buses were set on fire in order to stave off the arrival of Army reinforcements. At 19:15, a column of trucks and APCs from the 3rd Infantry Regiment managed to break through and drove towards Lanús without finding any resistance.

At 19:45, 70 ERP fighters under the command of Abigail Attademo (captain Miguel) entered the military base. Thirty-five of them formed an initial spearhead after ramming the main gate with a truck. Other guerrillas entered through other points of access. They were immediately mowed down by heavy fire from a FN MAG machine gun placed in the guard post, becoming the first casualties of the night. At 21:00, a second wave of fighters successfully broke into the compound.

The military laid a counter-siege around the battalion, rendering the ERP's containment groups on the surrounding bridges useless and nullifying the surprise factor. The base and neighboring shantytown became a whirlwind of gunfire and explosions, with helicopter gunships using reflectors to illuminate the area. A reporter compared the fighting with that of the Vietnam War. The Army raided entire neighborhoods hunting for surviving ERP fighters. At 01:00 on 24 December, Urteaga lost contact with most of the Communist platoons still inside the Arsenal Battalion and fighting died out shortly afterwards.

At 03:30, seven hours after the start of the assault and once it had already been repelled, a military scribe recorded that "Captain Lazzarano left with five vehicles to transport detainees under the custody of Lieutenant Silvani's fraction" and that they returned half an hour later.

=== Casualties and extrajudicial killings ===
The ERP lost over 90 of its fighters. Of the 62 that were killed in action, nine could not be identified due to them being only known by their nom de guerre. A number of them (30 according to Daniel De Santis) were taken prisoner and later summarily executed. At least 25 wounded were evacuated by their comrades. On the other hand, between seven and ten soldiers and policemen were killed and 34 wounded.

General Oscar Gallino acknowledged in 1991 that an undisclosed number of fighters were detained and handed over to Army intelligence units.

== See also ==
- Operation Primicia
- Dirty War
