= Juan Héctor Guidi =

Argentine footballer

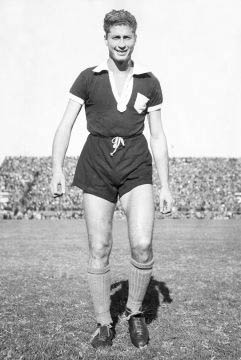
- Guidi with Lanús in 1954

Personal information
- Full name: Juan Héctor Guidi
- Date of birth: 4 July 1930
- Place of birth: Piñeiro, Argentina
- Date of death: 8 February 1973 (aged 42)
- Position: Midfielder

Senior career*
Years	Team	Apps	(Gls)
–1949	Unidos de Piñeyro		
1949–1961	Lanús	320 total	(10)
1962	Independiente	12	(0)
1963–1970	Lanús	(see above)	

International career
1956–1961	Argentina	37	(0)
- * Club domestic league appearances and goals

Juan Héctor Guidi (11 July 1930 – 8 February 1973) was an Argentine football midfielder. He played most of his career with Club Atlético Lanús he also made 37 appearances for the Argentina national team.

== Club career ==
Guidi, born in the city of Piñeiro, Avellaneda, started his career with local club Unidos de Piñeiro, before joining Lanús in 1949. In 1950 he helped the team to win the Argentine 2nd Division in 1950.

Guidi had a spell with Club Atlético Independiente but he never achieved the level of play that he had at Lanús.

Guidi rejoined Lanús helping them to win the 2nd division title in 1964. Guidi retired from football in 1966.

== International career ==
Guidi represented Argentina in two Copa Américas, the victorious Peru 1957 campaign and the Ecuador 1959 where Argentina finished in second place. He played a total of 37 games for Argentina putting him in the top 50 most capped Argentine men's footballers of all time.

== Honours ==
=== Club ===
Lanús

- Primera B: 1950, 1964

=== International ===
Argentina

- Copa América: Peru 1957
- Panamerican Championship: 1960

== Legacy ==
El Nene Guidi died in 1973 at the age of just 42, he is remembered as one of the most important idols of Club Atlético Lanús. One of the streets outside La Fortaleza was renamed Héctor Guidi in his honour.
