= Anacarsis Lanús =

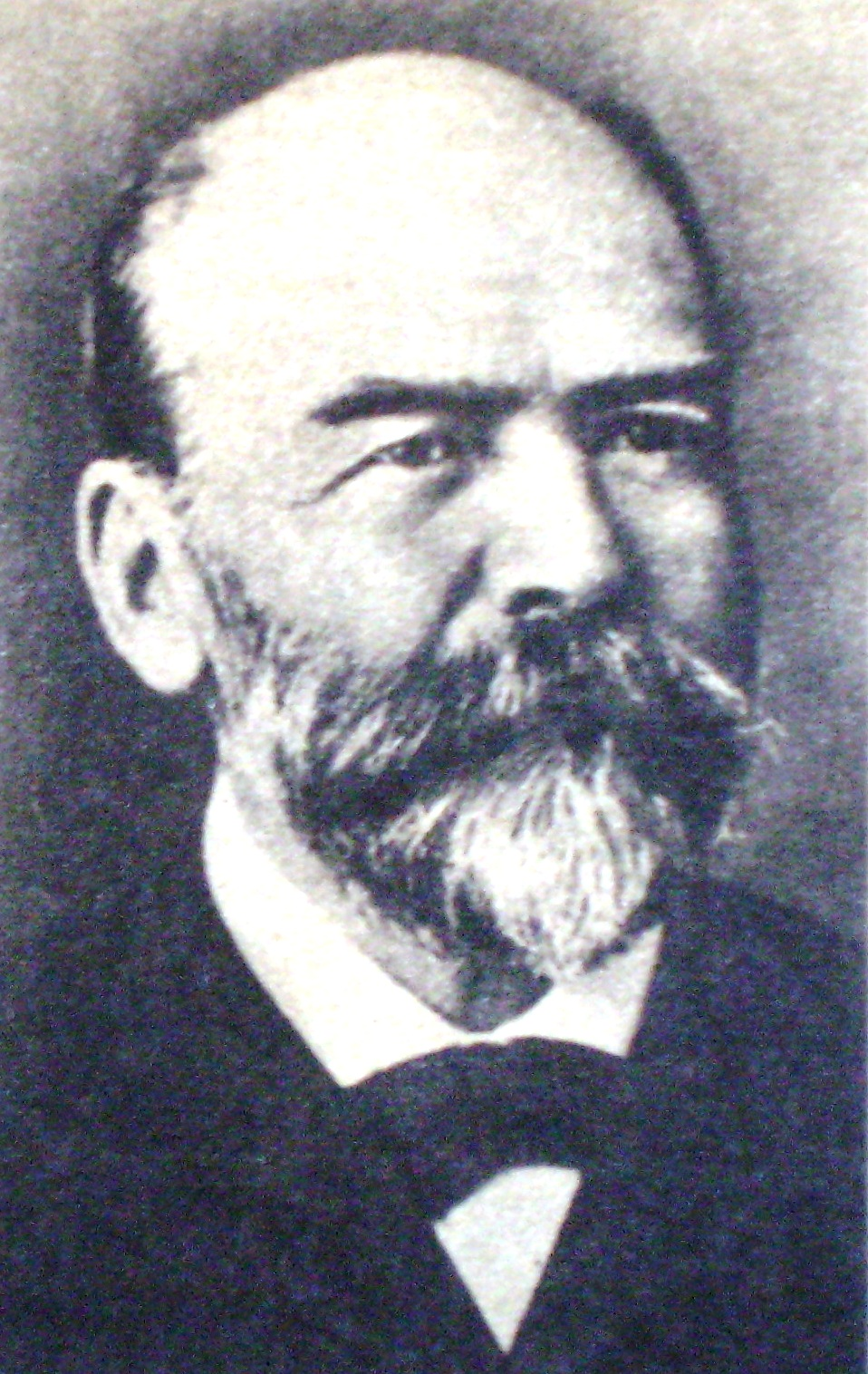
Anacarsis Lanús.

Hipólito Anacarsis Lanús (November 14, 1820 in Concepción del Uruguay, Entre Ríos – October 14, 1888) was an Argentine entrepreneur of French and Greek and Basque origin.

== Biography ==
He played a role during the years of the secessionist State of Buenos Aires movement. He was also Deputy Head of Police in the city of Buenos Aires.

Later, during the War of Triple Alliance, he became one of the richest men in his country as a purveyor to the Triple Alliance armies, and also during the Conquest of the Desert.

== Bibliography ==
- Cutolo, Vicente, Nuevo diccionario biográfico argentino, 7 volúmenes, Ed. Elche, Bs. As., 1968–1985.
- León Pomer, La guerra del Paraguay, Ed. Leviatán, Bs. As., 2008. ISBN 9875141410
- López Mato, Omar, 1874: Historia de la revolución olvidada, Ed. Olmo, s/f.
