= Puente Valentín Alsina =

Coordinates: 34°39′35″S 58°25′00″W

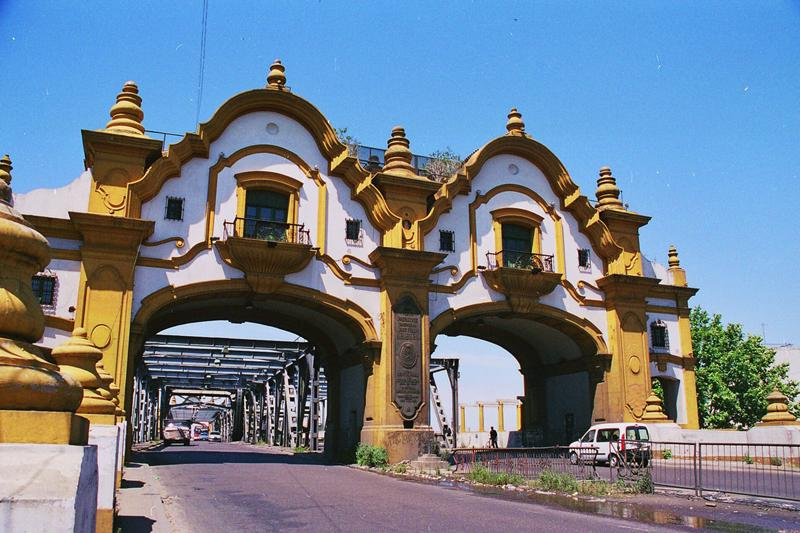
Castle-like facade of the Puente Alsina

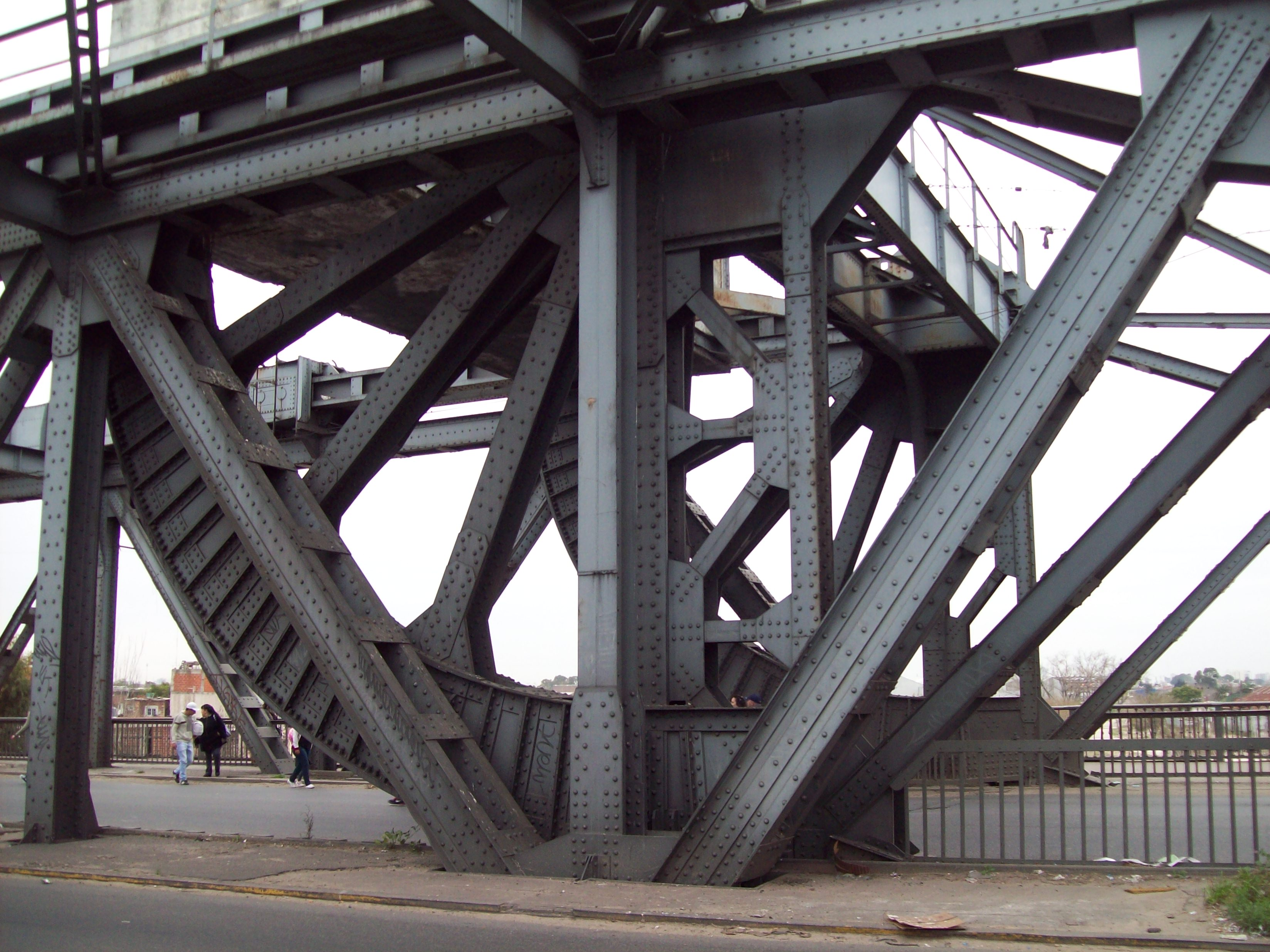
Part of the bridge's Rolling Lift bascule mechanism

The Puente Alsina, formerly known as the Puente Uriburu, is a neo-colonial bridge inaugurated in 1938, that joins the neighbourhood of Nueva Pompeya in the Argentine capital (Buenos Aires) with the city of Valentín Alsina (District of Lanús, Gran Buenos Aires), crossing over the Riachuelo.
