= 2026 Club Atlético Lanús season =

Club Atlético Lanús
2026 season
- Manager: Mauricio Pellegrino
- Stadium: Estadio Ciudad de Lanús
- Torneo Apertura: Round of 16
- Torneo Clausura: Preseason
- Copa Argentina: Round of 32
- Copa Libertadores: Group stage
- Copa Sudamericana: Knockout round play-offs
- Recopa Sudamericana: Champions (1st title)
| Home colours | Away colours | Third colours |

The 2026 season is the 111th for Club Atlético Lanús and their 12th consecutive season in the Primera División. The club will also compete in the Copa Argentina, Copa Libertadores, and Recopa Sudamericana.

Lanús defeated Flamengo 4–2 on aggregate to win their first Recopa Sudamericana.

== Squad ==
=== Current squad ===
As of 27 February 2026

Note: Flags indicate national team as defined under FIFA eligibility rules; some limited exceptions apply. Players may hold more than one non-FIFA nationality.

| No. | Pos. | Nation | Player |
|---|---|---|---|
| 1 | GK | ARG | Franco Petroli |
| 3 | DF | ARG | Nicolás Morgantini |
| 4 | DF | URU | Gonzalo Pérez |
| 5 | MF | ARG | Felipe Peña Biafore |
| 6 | DF | ARG | Sasha Marcich |
| 8 | MF | ARG | Franco Watson |
| 9 | FW | ARG | Walter Bou |
| 10 | MF | ARG | Marcelino Moreno |
| 11 | FW | ARG | Eduardo Salvio |
| 13 | DF | PAR | José Canale |
| 15 | MF | COL | Raúl Loaiza |
| 16 | MF | CHI | Matías Sepúlveda |
| 17 | MF | ARG | Agustín Medina |
| 19 | FW | ARG | Rodrigo Castillo |

| No. | Pos. | Nation | Player |
|---|---|---|---|
| 20 | FW | ARG | Bruno Cabrera |
| 22 | DF | ARG | Alexis González |
| 23 | MF | ARG | Ramiro Carrera |
| 24 | DF | ARG | Carlos Izquierdoz (captain) |
| 25 | FW | ARG | Dylan Aquino |
| 26 | GK | ARG | Nahuel Losada |
| 27 | DF | ARG | Facundo Sánchez |
| 28 | DF | ARG | Octavio Ontívero |
| 30 | MF | ARG | Agustín Cardozo |
| 31 | GK | ARG | Lucas Acosta |
| 33 | DF | ARG | Tomás Guidara |
| 35 | DF | PAR | Ronaldo de Jesús |
| 37 | FW | ARG | Thomás De Martis |
| 77 | FW | ARG | Lucas Besozzi |

=== Transfers In ===
| Pos. | Player | Transferred from | Fee | Date | Source |
|---|---|---|---|---|---|
| MF | (Chile) Matías Sepúlveda | Universidad de Chile | | 15 January 2026 | |
| FW | (Colombia) Yoshan Valois | (Colombia) Deportivo Pasto | | 16 March 2026 | |

=== Transfers Out ===
| Pos. | Player | Transferred to | Fee | Date | Source |
|---|---|---|---|---|---|
| GK | (Argentina) Rocco Ríos Novo | (United States) Inter Miami | | 26 January 2026 | |
| FW | (Argentina) Rodrigo Castillo | (Brazil) Fluminense | $10 million | 2 March 2026 | |

== Competitions ==
=== Overall record ===
| Competition | First match | Last match | Starting round | Final position | Record | | | | | | | |
| Competition | First match | Last match | Starting round | Final position | Pld | W | D | L | GF | GA | GD | Win % |
|---|---|---|---|---|---|---|---|---|---|---|---|---|
| Torneo Apertura | 23 January 2026 | 9 May 2026 | Matchday 1 | Round of 16 | 17 | 6 | 6 | 5 | 18 | 17 | +1 | 35.29 |
| Torneo Clausura | July 2026 | | Matchday 1 | 0 | 0 | 0 | 0 | 0 | 0 | 0 | +0 | — |
| Copa Argentina | 18 January 2026 | 30 May 2026 | Round of 64 | Round of 32 | 2 | 1 | 0 | 1 | 5 | 3 | +2 | 50.00 |
| Copa Libertadores | 8 April 2026 | 26 May 2026 | Group stage | Group stage | 6 | 3 | 0 | 3 | 3 | 7 | −4 | 50.00 |
| Copa Sudamericana | 22 July 2026 | | Knockout round | | 0 | 0 | 0 | 0 | 0 | 0 | +0 | — |
| Recopa Sudamericana | 19 February 2026 | 26 February 2026 | Final | Winner | 2 | 2 | 0 | 0 | 4 | 2 | +2 | 100.00 |
| Total | | | | | 27 | 12 | 6 | 9 | 30 | 29 | +1 | 44.44 |

Last updated: 28 May 2026
Source: Competitions

=== Primera División ===
==== Torneo Apertura ====
===== League table =====
| Pos | Team | Pld | W | D | L | GF | GA | GD | Pts | Qualification |
|---|---|---|---|---|---|---|---|---|---|---|
| 4 | Talleres (C) | 16 | 7 | 5 | 4 | 17 | 13 | +4 | 26 | Advance to round of 16 |
| 5 | Independiente | 16 | 6 | 6 | 4 | 24 | 20 | +4 | 24 | Advance to round of 16 |
| 6 | Lanús | 16 | 6 | 6 | 4 | 18 | 15 | +3 | 24 | Advance to round of 16 |
| 7 | San Lorenzo | 16 | 5 | 7 | 4 | 14 | 14 | 0 | 22 | Advance to round of 16 |
| 8 | Unión | 16 | 5 | 6 | 5 | 24 | 20 | +4 | 21 | Advance to round of 16 |

Source: AFA

===== Matches =====
| 23 January 2026 1 | San Lorenzo | 2–3 | Lanús | Buenos Aires |
| 19:00 UTC−3 | Cuello 53' (pen.), 86' | Report | Castillo 24'; Izquierdoz 30'; Moreno 73' | Stadium: Estadio Pedro Bidegain |

| 29 January 2026 2 | Lanús | 2–1 | Unión | Lanús |
| 19:15 UTC−3 | Carrera 45+3'; Moreno 56' | Report | Tarragona 66' | Stadium: Estadio Ciudad de Lanús |

| 3 February 2026 3 | Instituto | 2–2 | Lanús | Córdoba |
| 21:15 UTC−3 | Jara 25' (pen.); Gallardo 90+3' | Report | Marcich 54'; Moreno 71' | Stadium: Estadio Monumental Presidente Perón |

| 9 February 2026 4 | Lanús | 1–1 | Talleres | Lanús |
| 19:15 UTC−3 | Aquino 90+3' | Report | Río 90+1' | Stadium: Estadio Ciudad de Lanús |

| 13 February 2026 5 | Independiente | 2–0 | Lanús | Avellaneda |
| 20:00 UTC−3 | Abaldo 57'; Ávalos 63' | Report | | Stadium: Estadio Libertadores de América |

| 1 March 2026 8 | Defensa y Justicia | 1–1 | Lanús | Gobernador Costa |
| 21:30 UTC−3 | Amor 32' | Report | Bou 41' | Stadium: Estadio Norberto "Tito" Tomaghello |

| 4 March 2026 7 | Lanús | 0–3 | Boca Juniors | Lanús |
| 21:00 UTC−3 | | Report | Ascacíbar 15'; Merentiel 30', 64' | Stadium: Estadio Ciudad de Lanús |

| 13 March 2026 10 | Estudiantes | 0–1 | Lanús | La Plata |
| 20:00 UTC−3 | | Report | Aquino 75' | Stadium: Estadio Jorge Luis Hirschi |

| 17 March 2026 11 | Lanús | 5–0 | Newell's Old Boys | Lanús |
| 19:00 UTC−3 | Bou 16' (pen.); Aquino 37', 40', 54'; Salvio 55' | Report | | Stadium: Estadio Ciudad de Lanús |

| 21 March 2026 12 | Vélez Sarsfield | 0–1 | Lanús | Buenos Aires |
| 15:30 UTC−3 | | Report | Izquierdoz 71' | Stadium: José Amalfitani Stadium |

| 26 March 2026 6 | Argentinos Juniors | 2–1 | Lanús | Buenos Aires |
| 21:00 UTC−3 | López 53'; Oroz 61' (pen.) | Report | Carrera 85' | Stadium: Estadio Diego Armando Maradona |

| 1 April 2026 13 | Lanús | 0–0 | Platense | Lanús |
| 20:00 UTC−3 | | Report | | Stadium: Estadio Ciudad de Lanús |

| 13 April 2026 14 | Lanús | 1–0 | Banfield | Lanús |
| 19:00 UTC−3 | Valois 88' | Report | | Stadium: Estadio Ciudad de Lanús |

| 20 April 2026 15 | Gimnasia y Esgrima (M) | 1–0 | Lanús | Mendoza |
| 21:45 UTC−3 | Módica 54' | Report | | Stadium: Estadio Víctor Legrotaglie |

| 24 April 2026 16 | Lanús | 0–0 | Central Córdoba | Lanús |
| 19:15 UTC−3 | | Report | | Stadium: Estadio Ciudad de Lanús |

| 2 May 2026 9 | Lanús | 0–0 | Deportivo Riestra | Lanús |
| 14:30 UTC−3 | | Report | | Stadium: Estadio Ciudad de Lanús |

===== Final stages =====
| 9 May 2026 Round of 16 | Argentinos Juniors | 2–0 | Lanús | Buenos Aires |
| 22:15 | Álvarez 28'; Lescano 90+6' | Report | | Stadium: Estadio Diego Armando Maradona; Referee: Leandro Rey Hilfer |

==== Torneo Clausura ====
===== League table =====
| Pos | Team | Pld | W | D | L | GF | GA | GD | Pts | Qualification |
|---|---|---|---|---|---|---|---|---|---|---|
| 3 | Vélez Sarsfield (A) | 15 | 7 | 7 | 1 | 25 | 15 | +10 | 28 | Advance to round of 16 |
| 4 | Defensa y Justicia (A) | 15 | 8 | 4 | 3 | 21 | 14 | +7 | 28 | Advance to round of 16 |
| 5 | Lanús (A) | 15 | 7 | 4 | 4 | 18 | 11 | +7 | 25 | Advance to round of 16 |
| 6 | Newell's Old Boys | 15 | 5 | 7 | 3 | 14 | 11 | +3 | 22 | Advance to round of 16 |
| 7 | Gimnasia y Esgrima (M) | 15 | 6 | 3 | 6 | 17 | 16 | +1 | 21 | Advance to round of 16 |

Updated to match(es) played on 2 November 2026. Source: AFA
(A) Advance to a further round

=== Copa Argentina ===
| 18 January 2026 Round of 64 | Lanús | 4–1 | Sarmiento (LB) | Caseros |
| 21:15 | Moreno 43' (pen.), 73'; Castillo 61'; Guzmán 85' (o.g.) | Report | Roldán 58' | Stadium: Ciudad de Caseros; Referee: Bruno Amiconi |

| 30 May 2026 Round of 32 | Instituto | 2–1 | Lanús | Rosario |
| | | Report | | Stadium: Marcelo Bielsa |

=== Copa Libertadores ===
==== Group stage ====
Lanús will enter the group stage as the defending Copa Sudamericana champions.

| Pos | Team | Pld | W | D | L | GF | GA | GD | Pts | Qualification |
|---|---|---|---|---|---|---|---|---|---|---|
| 1 | (Ecuador) LDU Quito | 6 | 4 | 0 | 2 | 8 | 5 | +3 | 12 | Advance to round of 16 |
| 2 | (Brazil) Mirassol | 6 | 4 | 0 | 2 | 7 | 4 | +3 | 12 | Advance to round of 16 |
| 3 | (Argentina) Lanús | 6 | 3 | 0 | 3 | 3 | 7 | −4 | 9 | Transfer to Copa Sudamericana |
| 4 | (Bolivia) Always Ready | 6 | 1 | 0 | 5 | 7 | 9 | −2 | 3 | |

Source: CONMEBOL

| 8 April 2026 1 | Mirassol (Brazil) | 1–0 | (Argentina) Lanús | Mirassol, Brazil |
| 19:00 UTC−3 | João Victor 60' | Report | | Stadium: Estádio José Maria de Campos Maia; Attendance: 6,595; Referee: Jhon Ospina (Colombia) |

| 16 April 2026 2 | Lanús (Argentina) | 1–0 | (Bolivia) Always Ready | Lanús |
| 19:00 UTC−3 | Valois 67' | Report | | Stadium: Estadio Ciudad de Lanús; Referee: Alexis Herrera (Venezuela) |

| 28 April 2026 3 | Lanús (Argentina) | 1–0 | (Ecuador) LDU Quito | Lanús |
| 19:00 UTC−3 | Cardozo 74' | Report | | Stadium: Estadio Ciudad de Lanús; Referee: José Cabero (Chile) |

| 5 May 2026 4 | Always Ready (Bolivia) | 4–0 | (Argentina) Lanús | El Alto, Bolivia |
| 20:30 UTC−4 | Gómez 26'; Triverio 45'; Amoroso 46'; Suárez 89' | Report | | Stadium: Estadio Municipal de Villa Ingenio; Referee: Roberto Pérez (Peru) |

| 20 May 2026 5 | LDU Quito (Ecuador) | 2–0 | (Argentina) Lanús | Quito, Ecuador |
| 19:30 UTC−5 | Peña Biafore 74' (o.g.); Cornejo 90+1' | Report | | Stadium: Estadio Rodrigo Paz Delgado; Referee: Andrés Rojas (Colombia) |

| 26 May 2026 6 | Lanús (Argentina) | 1–0 | (Brazil) Mirassol | Lanús |
| 19:00 UTC−3 | Medina 22' | Report | | Stadium: Estadio Ciudad de Lanús; Referee: Carlos Benítez (Paraguay) |

=== Copa Sudamericana ===
==== Final stages ====
===== Knockout round play-offs =====
| 22 July 2026 First leg | Lanús (Argentina) | v | (Peru) Cienciano | Lanús |
| 21:30 UTC−3 | | | | Stadium: Estadio Ciudad de Lanús |

| 29 July 2026 Second leg | Cienciano (Peru) | v | (Argentina) Lanús | Cusco, Peru |
| 19:30 UTC−5 | | | | Stadium: Estadio Garcilaso |

=== Recopa Sudamericana ===
| 19 February 2026 First leg | Lanús (Argentina) | 1–0 | (Brazil) Flamengo | Lanús, Argentina |
| 21:30 UTC−3 | Castillo 77' | Report | | Stadium: Estadio Ciudad de Lanús; Referee: Alexis Herrera (Venezuela) |

| 26 February 2026 Second leg | Flamengo (Brazil) | 2–3 (a.e.t.) (2–4 agg.) | (Argentina) Lanús | Rio de Janeiro, Brazil |
| 21:30 UTC−3 | De Arrascaeta 37' (pen.); Jorginho 85' (pen.) | Report | Castillo 29'; Canale 118'; Aquino 120+2' | Stadium: Maracanã; Referee: Gustavo Tejera (Uruguay) |
