= 2025 Club Atlético Lanús season =

Club Atlético Lanús
2025 season
- Manager: Mauricio Pellegrino
- Stadium: Estadio Ciudad de Lanús
- Torneo Apertura: Round of 16
- Torneo Clausura: Round of 16
- Copa Argentina: Quarter-finals
- Copa Sudamericana: Champions (2nd title)
Home colours	Away colours	Third colours

The 2025 season was the 110th for Club Atlético Lanús and their 11th consecutive season in the Primera División. The club also competed in the Copa Argentina and Copa Sudamericana.

Lanús home fixture against Rosario Central was the first Primera División match to allow away fans after a 12-year ban.

On 22 November, Lanús won their second Copa Sudamericana title after defeating Brazilian side Atlético Mineiro 5–4 on kicks from the penalty mark following a 0–0 draw after extra time in the final.

== Squad ==
=== Current squad ===
As of 1 February 2025

Note: Flags indicate national team as defined under FIFA eligibility rules; some limited exceptions apply. Players may hold more than one non-FIFA nationality.

No.	Pos.	Nation	Player
2	DF	ARG	Ezequiel Muñoz
3	DF	ARG	Nicolás Morgantini
4	DF	URU	Gonzalo Pérez
5	MF	ARG	Felipe Peña Biafore
6	DF	ARG	Sasha Marcich
7	FW	ARG	Lautaro Acosta (captain)
9	FW	ARG	Walter Bou
10	FW	ARG	Marcelino Moreno
11	FW	ARG	Eduardo Salvio
12	GK	ARG	Nicolás Cláa
13	DF	ARG	Leonel Cardozo
14	FW	ARG	Alexis Canelo
15	MF	COL	Raúl Loaiza
17	GK	ARG	Lautaro Morales
19	MF	ARG	Agustín Rodríguez
20	FW	ARG	Bruno Cabrera

No.	Pos.	Nation	Player
21	DF	URU	Armando Méndez (on loan from Newell's Old Boys)
23	MF	ARG	Ramiro Carrera
24	DF	ARG	Carlos Izquierdoz (vice captain)
25	FW	ARG	Dylan Aquino
26	GK	ARG	Nahuel Losada
28	DF	ARG	Octavio Ontivero
29	DF	ARG	Brian Aguilar
30	MF	ARG	Agustín Cardozo
31	GK	ARG	Gustavo Calderari
32	FW	ARG	Franco Orozco
33	MF	ARG	Juan Ramírez (on loan from Boca Juniors)
34	MF	ARG	Mariano Gerez
35	DF	PAR	Ronaldo de Jesús
36	FW	ARG	Alexis Segovia
39	MF	ARG	Agustín Medina

=== Transfers In ===
Pos.	Player	Transferred from	Fee	Date	Source
MF	(Argentina) Agustín Cardozo	(Argentina) Tigre	Undisclosed	27 December 2024	
DF	(Paraguay) Ronaldo de Jesús	(Paraguay) Cerro Porteño	Undisclosed	15 January 2025	
MF	(Argentina) Juan Ramírez	(Argentina) Boca Juniors	Loan	3 February 2025	
DF	(Paraguay) José Canale	(Mexico) Querétaro	Loan return	30 June 2025	
FW	(Argentina) Rodrigo Castillo	(Argentina) Gimnasia y Esgrima	Undisclosed	8 July 2025	

=== Transfers Out ===
Pos.	Player	Transferred to	Fee	Date	Source
DF	(Argentina) Julio Soler	(England) Bournemouth	£6,600,000	7 January 2025	
MF	(Argentina) Lucas Besozzi	(Argentina) Tigre	Loan	16 January 2025	
GK	(Argentina) Rocco Ríos Novo	(United States) Inter Miami CF	Loan	16 January 2025	
MF	(Uruguay) Luciano Boggio	(Uruguay) Nacional	Undisclosed	1 February 2025	
DF	(Paraguay) Juan José Cáceres	(Russia) Dynamo Moscow	€3,400,000	19 February 2025	
MF	(Argentina) Lucas Besozzi	(Argentina) Central Córdoba	Loan	24 June 2025	
MF	(Argentina) Maximiliano González	(Argentina) Godoy Cruz	Loan	17 July 2025	
GK	(Argentina) Nicolás Claa	(Argentina) Godoy Cruz	Loan	17 July 2025	
MF	(Argentina) Franco Orozco	(Argentina) Newell's Old Boys	Loan	24 July 2025	

== Competitions ==
=== Overall record ===
Competition	First match	Last match	Starting round	Final position	Record							
Competition	First match	Last match	Starting round	Final position	Pld	W	D	L	GF	GA	GD	Win %
Torneo Apertura	23 January 2025	10 May 2025	Matchday 1	Round of 16	17	4	9	4	13	11	+2	23.53
Torneo Clausura	14 July 2025	26 November 2025	Matchday 1	Round of 16	17	9	3	5	20	14	+6	52.94
Copa Argentina	5 February 2025	8 September 2025	Round of 64	Quarter-finals	4	3	0	1	8	1	+7	75.00
Copa Sudamericana	3 April 2025	22 November 2025	Group stage	Winner	13	6	6	1	15	8	+7	46.15
Total					51	22	18	11	56	34	+22	43.14

Last updated: 26 November 2025
Source: Competitions

=== Primera División ===
==== Torneo Apertura ====
===== League table =====
Pos	Team	Pld	W	D	L	GF	GA	GD	Pts	Qualification
5	Deportivo Riestra	16	5	9	2	13	7	+6	24	Advance to round of 16
6	Platense	16	6	5	5	13	11	+2	23	Advance to round of 16
7	Lanús	16	4	8	4	13	11	+2	20	Advance to round of 16
8	Instituto	16	5	3	8	16	20	−4	18	Advance to round of 16
9	Godoy Cruz	16	3	8	5	8	18	−10	17	

Source: AFA

===== Results by round =====
Round	1
Ground	H
Result	
Position	

A = Away; H = Home; W = Win; D = Draw; L = Loss

===== Matches =====
23 January 2025 1	Lanús	0–2	Deportivo Riestra	Lanús
21:30 UTC−3		Report		Stadium: Estadio Ciudad de Lanús

28 January 2025 2	Rosario Central	2–1	Lanús	Rosario
19:15 UTC−3	Campaz 10'; Malcorra 38', pen'	Report	Bou 84'	Stadium: Estadio Gigante de Arroyito; Referee: Luis Lobo Medina

1 February 2025 3	Lanús	2–0	Sarmiento	Lanús
21:00 UTC−3	Moreno 5'; Salvio 23'			Stadium: Estadio Ciudad de Lanús

9 February 2025 4	Talleres de Córdoba	0–1	Lanús	Córdoba
21:30 UTC−3		Report	Bou 42'	Stadium: Estadio Mario Alberto Kempes

13 February 2025 5	Lanús	0–0	Gimnasia La Plata	Lanús
17:45 UTC−3		Report		Stadium: Estadio Ciudad de Lanús

16 February 2025 6	River Plate	1–0	Lanús	Buenos Aires
19:15 UTC−3	Borja 77'	Report		Stadium: Estadio Monumental; Referee: Facundo Tello

21 February 2025 7	Lanús	0–0	Vélez Sarsfield	Lanús
21:30 UTC−3		Report		Stadium: Estadio Ciudad de Lanús

2 March 2025 8	Independiente Rivadavia	1–1	Lanús	Mendoza
17:00 UTC−3	Retamar 46'	Report	Bou 71', pen'	Stadium: Estadio Bautista Gargantini

8 March 2025 9	Platense	0–0	Lanús	Florida
21:30 UTC−3		Report		Stadium: Estadio Ciudad de Vicente López

17 March 2025 10	Lanús	4–1	Instituto	Lanús
22:00 UTC−3	Carrera 44'; Segovia 61'; Moreno 70'; Canelo 90+2'	Report	Luna 18'	Stadium: Estadio Ciudad de Lanús

28 March 2025 11	San Lorenzo	1–1	Lanús	Buenos Aires
19:15 UTC−3	Muniain 65'		Moreno 82'	Stadium: Estadio Pedro Bidegain

6 April 2025 12	Lanús	1–1	Independiente	Lanús
15:30 UTC−3	Salvio 57' (pen.)	Report	Galdames 4'	Stadium: Estadio Ciudad de Lanús

14 April 2025 13	Godoy Cruz	0–0	Lanús	Mendoza
21:15 UTC−3		Report		Stadium: Estadio Malvinas Argentinas

19 April 2025 14	Lanús	1–1	Banfield	Lanús
16:15 UTC−3	Salvio 26' (pen.)	Report	Rivera 76'	Stadium: Estadio Ciudad de Lanús

27 April 2025 15	Lanús	1–0	San Martín	Lanús
19:00 UTC−3	Moreno 59'	Report		Stadium: Estadio Ciudad de Lanús

3 May 2025 16	Atlético Tucumán	1–0	Lanús	San Miguel de Tucumán
21:00 UTC−3	Nicola 90+2'	Report		Stadium: Estadio Monumental José Fierro

===== Final stages =====
10 May 2025 Round of 16	Boca Juniors	0–0 (4–2 p)	Lanús	Buenos Aires
21:00 UTC−3		Report		Stadium: La Bombonera; Referee: Leandro Rey Hilfer
	Penalties
	Rojo (penalty scored); Zeballos (penalty scored); Alarcón (penalty scored); Giménez (penalty scored)		(penalty missed) Canelo; (penalty scored) Moreno; (penalty missed) Aquino; (penalty scored) Carrera

==== Torneo Clausura ====
===== League table =====
Pos	Team	Pld	W	D	L	GF	GA	GD	Pts	Qualification
1	Rosario Central	16	8	7	1	18	8	+10	31	Advance to round of 16
2	Lanús	16	9	3	4	20	13	+7	30	Advance to round of 16
3	Deportivo Riestra	16	8	4	4	19	12	+7	28	Advance to round of 16
4	Vélez Sarsfield	16	7	5	4	19	12	+7	26	Advance to round of 16
5	San Lorenzo	16	6	6	4	13	11	+2	24	Advance to round of 16

Source: AFA

===== Results by round =====
Round	1
Ground	
Result	
Position	

A = Away; H = Home; W = Win; D = Draw; L = Loss

===== Matches =====
14 July 2025 1	Deportivo Riestra	1–0	Lanús	Buenos Aires
16:30 UTC−3	Herrera 79'	Report		Stadium: Estadio Guillermo Laza

19 July 2025 2	Lanús	0–1	Rosario Central	Lanús
16:30 UTC−3		Report	Di María 74' (pen.)	Stadium: Estadio Ciudad de Lanús

25 July 2025 3	Sarmiento	0–2	Lanús	Junín
19:00 UTC−3		Report	Castillo 10', 43'	Stadium: Estadio Eva Perón

8 August 2025 4	Lanús	1–0	Talleres	Lanús
21:15 UTC−3	Castillo 45+1'	Report		Stadium: Estadio Ciudad de Lanús

17 August 2025 5	Gimnasia y Esgrima	1–2	Lanús	La Plata
14:00 UTC−3	Torres 42'	Report	Canale 55'; Watson 62'	Stadium: Estadio Juan Carmelo Zerillo

25 August 2025 6	Lanús	1–1	River Plate	Lanús
21:15 UTC−3	Castillo 90+5'	Report	Montiel 77'	Stadium: Estadio Ciudad de Lanús; Referee: Leandro Rey Hilfer

30 August 2025 7	Vélez Sarsfield	3–0	Lanús	Buenos Aires
21:30 UTC−3	Romero 22'; Galván 50'; Carrizo 53'	Report		Stadium: José Amalfitani Stadium

12 September 2025 8	Lanús	1–0	Independiente Rivadavia	Lanús
21:15 UTC−3	Bou 56'	Report		Stadium: Estadio Ciudad de Lanús; Referee: Hernán Mastrángelo

19 September 2025 9	Lanús	2–1	Platense	Lanús
21:15 UTC−3	Canale 37'; Acosta 45+1'	Report	Martínez 90+5'	Stadium: Estadio Ciudad de Lanús; Referee: Pablo Dóvalo

28 September 2025 10	Instituto	0–0	Lanús	Córdoba
20:15 UTC−3		Report		Stadium: Estadio Monumental Presidente Perón

4 October 2025 11	Lanús	2–1	San Lorenzo	Lanús
21:15 UTC−3	Marcich 29'; Bou 53'	Report	Herazo 78'	Stadium: Estadio Ciudad de Lanús; Referee: Leandro Rey Hilfer

12 October 2025 12	Independiente	0–2	Lanús	Avellaneda
21:15 UTC−3		Report	Bou 26'; Castillo 89'	Stadium: Estadio Libertadores de América

17 October 2025 13	Lanús	2–0	Godoy Cruz	Lanús
21:15 UTC−3	Canale 33'; Castillo 90+4'	Report		Stadium: Estadio Ciudad de Lanús

3 November 2025 14	Banfield	2–1	Lanús	Banfield
20:15 UTC−3	Sepúlveda 35'; Auzmendi 68'	Report	Salvio 90+3'	Stadium: Estadio Florencio Sola

9 November 2025 15	San Martín	1–1	Lanús	San Juan
21:30 UTC−3	Lecanda 90'	Report	Castillo 6'	Stadium: Estadio Ingeniero Hilario Sánchez

14 November 2025 16	Lanús	3–1	Atlético Tucumán	Lanús
20:00 UTC−3	José Canale 19'; Salvio 72'; Moreno 76'	Report	Ruiz Rodríguez 32'	Stadium: Estadio Ciudad de Lanús

===== Final stages =====
26 November 2025 Round of 16	Lanús	0–1	Tigre	Lanús
21:30 UTC−3		Report	Romero 47'	Stadium: Ciudad de Lanús – Néstor Díaz Pérez; Referee: Leandro Rey Hilfer

=== Copa Argentina ===
5 February 2025 Round of 64	Lanús	4–0	General Lamadrid	Sarandí
19:15	Moreno 37', 58'; Aquino 45'; Orozco 51'	Report		Stadium: Julio Humberto Grondona; Referee: Bruno Amiconi

21 May 2025 Round of 32	Lanús	2–0	Vélez Sarsfield	Morón
21:10	Carrera 21'; Salvio 36'	Report		Stadium: Nuevo Francisco Urbano; Referee: Andrés Gariano

1 August 2025 Round of 16	Lanús	2–0	Huracán	Quilmes
20:45	Marcich 51'; Aquino 69'	Report		Stadium: Centenario Ciudad de Quilmes; Referee: Sebastián Zunino

8 September 2025 Quarter-finals	Argentinos Juniors	1–0	Lanús	Avellaneda
21:10	Molina 35'	Report		Stadium: El Cilindro; Referee: Darío Herrera

=== Copa Sudamericana ===
==== Group stage ====
Pos	Team	Pld	W	D	L	GF	GA	GD	Pts	Qualification
1	(Argentina) Lanús	6	3	3	0	9	4	+5	12	Advance to round of 16
2	(Brazil) Vasco da Gama	6	2	2	2	8	8	0	8	Advance to knockout round play-offs
3	(Peru) Melgar	6	2	1	3	5	10	−5	7	
4	(Venezuela) Academia Puerto Cabello	6	1	2	3	8	8	0	5	

Source: CONMEBOL

3 April 2025 1	Academia Puerto Cabello (Venezuela)	2–2	(Argentina) Lanús	Valencia, Venezuela
18:00 UTC−4	Paredes 14'; Awudu 50'	Report	Canelo 69'; Aquino 75'	Stadium: Estadio Misael Delgado (Note: Academia Puerto Cabello will play their home matches at Estadio Misael Delgado, Valencia instead of their regular stadium Estadio La Bombonerita, Puerto Cabello which did not meet CONMEBOL requirements.); Referee: Carlos Ortega (Colombia)

9 April 2025 2	Lanús (Argentina)	3–0	(Peru) Melgar	Lanús, Argentina
21:30 UTC−3	Moreno 45+1'; Salvio 47'; Orozco 79'	Report		Stadium: Estadio Ciudad de Lanús; Referee: Mathías De Armas (Uruguay)

22 April 2025 3	Vasco da Gama (Brazil)	0–0	(Argentina) Lanús	Rio de Janeiro, Brazil
21:30 UTC−3		Report		Stadium: Estádio São Januário; Referee: Gery Vargas (Bolivia)

6 May 2025 4	Melgar (Peru)	0–1	(Argentina) Lanús	Arequipa, Peru
21:00 UTC−5		Report	Medina 84'	Stadium: Estadio Monumental de la UNSA; Referee: Carlos Ortega (Colombia)

13 May 2025 5	Lanús (Argentina)	1–0	(Brazil) Vasco da Gama	Lanús, Argentina
21:30 UTC−3	Carrera 53'	Report		Stadium: Estadio Ciudad de Lanús; Referee: Carlos Benítez (Paraguay)

27 May 2025 6	Lanús (Argentina)	2–2	(Venezuela) Academia Puerto Cabello	Lanús, Argentina
19:00 UTC−3	Salvio 12'; Moreno 21'	Report	Paredes 15', 62' (pen.)	Stadium: Estadio Ciudad de Lanús; Referee: Ivo Méndez (Bolivia)

==== Final stages ====
The draw for the round of 16 was held on 2 June 2025, 12:00 PYT (UTC−3) at the CONMEBOL headquarters in Luque, Paraguay.

===== Round of 16 =====
14 August 2025 First leg	Central Córdoba (Argentina)	1–0	(Argentina) Lanús	Santiago del Estero
21:30 UTC−3	Verón 58'	Report		Stadium: Estadio Único Madre de Ciudades (Note: Central Córdoba play their home matches at Estadio Único Madre de Ciudades, Santiago del Estero instead of their regular stadium Estadio Alfredo Terrera, Santiago del Estero.); Attendance: 11,763; Referee: Kevin Ortega (Peru)

21 August 2025 Second leg	Lanús (Argentina)	1–0 (1–1 agg.) (4–2 p)	(Argentina) Central Córdoba	Lanús
21:30 UTC−3	Aquino 90+1'	Report		Stadium: Estadio Ciudad de Lanús; Attendance: 14,999; Referee: Cristian Garay (Chile)
	Penalties
	Bou (penalty scored); Izquierdoz (penalty scored); Marcich (penalty scored); Moreno (penalty scored)		(penalty missed) Verón; (penalty missed) Cufré; (penalty scored) Galván; (penalty scored) Vera

===== Quarter-finals =====
18 September 2025 First leg	Lanús (Argentina)	1–0	(Brazil) Fluminense	Lanús, Argentina
21:30 UTC−3	Moreno 89'	Report		Stadium: Estadio Ciudad de Lanús; Referee: Gustavo Tejera (Uruguay)

23 September 2025 Second leg	Fluminense (Brazil)	1–1 (1–2 agg.)	(Argentina) Lanús	Rio de Janeiro, Brazil
21:30 UTC−3	Canobbio 20'	Report	Aquino 67'	Stadium: Estádio do Maracanã; Attendance: 43,742; Referee: Jesús Valenzuela (Venezuela)

===== Semi-finals =====
23 October 2025 First leg	Universidad de Chile	2–2	(Argentina) Lanús	Santiago, Chile
19:00 UTC−3	Di Yorio 63'; Aránguiz 90+9' (pen.)		Castillo 25', 29'	Stadium: Estadio Nacional Julio Martínez Prádanos; Attendance: 0 Referee: Anderson Daronco (Brazil)

30 October 2025 Second leg	Lanús (Argentina)	1–0 (3–2 agg.)	Universidad de Chile	Lanús, Argentina
19:00 UTC−3	Castillo 62'	Report		Stadium: Estadio Ciudad de Lanús; Referee: Alexis Herrera (Venezuela)

===== Final =====
22 November 2025 Final	Lanús (Argentina)	0–0 (a.e.t.) (5–4 p)	(Brazil) Atlético Mineiro	Asunción, Paraguay
17:00 UTC−3		Report		Stadium: Estadio Defensores del Chaco; Referee: Piero Maza (Chile)
	Penalties
	Bou (penalty missed); Izquierdoz (penalty scored); Marcich (penalty scored); Aquino (penalty scored); Acosta (penalty missed); Cardozo (penalty scored); Watson (penalty scored)		(penalty missed) Hulk; (penalty scored) Scarpa; (penalty scored) Igor Gomes; (penalty missed) Biel Teixeira; (penalty scored) Everson; (penalty scored) Alexsander; (penalty missed) Vitor Hugo
