= 2024 Club Atlético Lanús season =

Club Atlético Lanús
2024 season
- Chairman: Luis María Chebel
- Manager: Ricardo Zielinski
- Stadium: Estadio Ciudad de Lanús
- Primera División: 14th
- Copa Argentina: Round of 64
- Copa de la Liga Profesional: Group stage
- Copa Sudamericana: Semi-finals
- Top goalscorer: League: Walter Bou (13); All: Walter Bou (20)
- Biggest win: 5–0 vs Metropolitanos (15 May 2024, Copa Sudamericana)
- Biggest defeat: 0–3 vs Huracán (22 September 2024, Primera División)
Home colours	Away colours

The 2024 season was the 109th for Club Atlético Lanús and their 10th consecutive season in the Primera División. The club also competed– in the Copa Argentina, Copa de la Liga Profesional, and Copa Sudamericana.

== Players ==
As of 13 December 2024.

Note: Flags indicate national team as defined under FIFA eligibility rules; some limited exceptions apply. Players may hold more than one non-FIFA nationality.

No.	Pos.	Nation	Player
—	FW	ARG	Augusto Lotti (on loan from Cruz Azul)
1	GK	ARG	Alan Aguerre (on loan from Talleres)
2	DF	ARG	Ezequiel Muñoz
2	DF	ARG	Nicolás Morgantini
4	DF	URU	Gonzalo Pérez
5	MF	ARG	Felipe Peña Biafore (on loan from River Plate)
6	DF	ARG	Abel Luciatti
7	FW	ARG	Lautaro Acosta (Captain)
8	MF	URU	Luciano Boggio
9	FW	ARG	Walter Bou
10	MF	ARG	Marcelino Moreno
11	MF	ARG	Favio Álvarez
12	GK	ARG	Nicolás Cláa
13	DF	PAR	José Canale
14	FW	ARG	Eduardo Salvio
15	MF	COL	Raúl Loaiza
16	MF	ARG	Agustín Rodríguez

No.	Pos.	Nation	Player
18	FW	ARG	Leandro Díaz
19	DF	ARG	Leonardo Jara
19	MF	ARG	Maxi González
20	FW	ARG	Bruno Cabrera
21	DF	PAR	Juan José Cáceres (on loan from Racing Club)
22	DF	ARG	Julio Soler
23	DF	ARG	Nery Domínguez
24	DF	ARG	Carlos Izquierdoz
25	FW	ARG	Dylan Aquino
26	GK	ARG	Nahuel Losada
27	FW	ARG	Jonathan Torres (on loan from Sarmiento)
28	DF	ARG	Octavio Ontivero
29	DF	ARG	Brian Aguilar
29	FW	ARG	Mateo Sanabria
30	MF	ARG	Franco Watson
32	MF	ARG	Ramiro Carrera
33	DF	ARG	Lucas Irusta
35	DF	ARG	Braian Aguirre
36	MF	ARG	Mariano Gerez
37	DF	ARG	Leonel Cardozo
42	GK	ARG	Lucas Acosta

== Competitions ==
=== Overall ===
Competition	First match	Last match	Starting round	Final position	Record							
Competition	First match	Last match	Starting round	Final position	Pld	W	D	L	GF	GA	GD	Win %
Primera División	12 May 2024	13 December 2024	Matchday 1	14th	27	8	12	7	28	31	−3	29.63
Copa de la Liga Profesional	27 January 2024	16 April 2024	Group Stage	Group Stage	14	7	2	5	20	14	+6	50.00
Copa Argentina	15 March 2024	15 March 2024	Round of 64	Round of 64	1	0	0	1	0	1	−1	0.00
Copa Sudamericana	3 April 2024	30 October 2024	Group Stage	Semi-finals	12	6	4	2	19	8	+11	50.00
Total					54	21	18	15	67	54	+13	38.89

Last updated: 15 December 2024.
Source: Competitions

=== Primera División ===
==== League table ====
Pos	Team	Pld	W	D	L	GF	GA	GD	Pts
12	Estudiantes (LP)	27	8	12	7	36	34	+2	36
13	Instituto	27	10	6	11	32	31	+1	36
14	Lanús	27	8	12	7	28	31	−3	36
15	Godoy Cruz	27	8	11	8	31	28	+3	35
16	Belgrano	27	8	11	8	33	32	+1	35

Source: AFA
Rules for classification: 1) points; 2) goal difference; 3) goals scored; 4) head-to-head results; 5) fair play ranking 6) drawing of lots.

==== Aggregate table ====
Pos	Team	Pld	W	D	L	GF	GA	GD	Pts	Qualification
9	Huracán	41	16	14	11	40	30	+10	62	Qualification for Copa Sudamericana group stage
10	Unión	41	16	12	13	43	40	+3	60	Qualification for Copa Sudamericana group stage
11	Lanús	41	15	14	12	48	45	+3	59	Qualification for Copa Sudamericana group stage
12	Defensa y Justicia	41	14	16	11	44	46	−2	58	Qualification for Copa Sudamericana group stage
13	Platense	41	14	15	12	30	32	−2	57	

Source: AFA

==== Results summary ====
Overall								Home						Away					
Pld	W	D	L	GF	GA	GD	Pts	W	D	L	GF	GA	GD	W	D	L	GF	GA	GD
27	8	12	7	28	31	−3	36	6	6	2	16	12	+4	2	6	5	12	19	−7

Source: AFA

==== Matches ====
Win Draw Loss Postponed

12 May 2024 1	Lanús	0–2	Independiente Rivadavia	Lanús
--:-- UTC−3		Report	Petrasso 9'; Reali 83'	Stadium: Ciudad de Lanús; Attendance: 8,000; Referee: Sebastian Zunino

20 May 2024 2	San Lorenzo	1–1	Lanús	Buenos Aires
19:00 UTC−3	Ferreira 66'	Report	Bou 19'	Stadium: Estadio Pedro Bidegain

24 May 2024 3	Lanús	2–1	Estudiantes	Lanús
--:-- UTC−3	Moreno 46'; Bou 84'	Report	Mancuso 65'	Stadium: Ciudad de Lanús; Attendance: 9,800; Referee: Andres Merlos

2 June 2024 4	Rosario Central	1–1	Lanús	Rosario
--:-- UTC−3	[[Marco Ruben]|Ruben]] 90+4'	Report	Biafore 23'	Stadium: Estadio Gigante de Arroyito; Attendance: 41,654; Referee: Sebastian Martinez

13 June 2024 5	Lanús	2–0	Estudiantes	Lanús
--:-- UTC−3	Carrera 44'; Bou 64'	Report		Stadium: Ciudad de Lanús; Attendance: 8,200; Referee: Leandro Hilfer

21 July 2024 6	River Plate	2–2	Lanús	Buenos Aires
15:00 UTC−3	Borja 62', 90+4'	Report	Moreno 49'; Torres 90+2'	Stadium: Estadio Monumental; Attendance: 84,567; Referee: Fernando Rapallini

25 July 2024 7	Lanús	3–2	Belgrano	Lanús
--:-- UTC−3	Moreno 32'; Sanabria 55'; Torres 84'	Report	Rolón 41'; Jara 90'	Stadium: Ciudad de Lanús

29 July 2024 8	Argentinos Juniors	2–0	Lanús	Buenos Aires
--:-- UTC−3	Romero 53'; Rodríguez 56'	Report		Stadium: Estadio Diego Maradona

4 August 2024 9	Lanús	3–2	Tigre	Lanús
--:-- UTC−3	Salvio 56', 69'; Bou 90'	Report	Carrera 37' (o.g.); Monzón 73'	Stadium: Ciudad de Lanús; Referee: Pablo Dovalo

9 August 2024 10	Deportivo Riestra	3–1	Lanús	Buenos Aires
--:-- UTC−3	Alonso 49'; Díaz 77'; Herrera 90+5'	Report	Torres 80'	Stadium: Estadio Guillermo Laza; Attendance: 1,442

17 August 2024 11	Lanús	1–1	Central Córdoba	Lanús
--:-- UTC−3	Rodríguez 35'	Report	Varaldo 85' (pen.)	Stadium: Ciudad de Lanús

25 August 2024 12	Lanús	1–1	Godoy Cruz	Lanús
--:-- UTC−3	Bou 21'	Report	Abrego 82'	Stadium: Ciudad de Lanús

30 August 2024 13	Sarmiento	0–0	Lanús	Junín
--:-- UTC−3		Report		Stadium: Estadio Eva Perón

13 September 2024 14	Lanús	1–1	Unión de Santa Fe	Lanús
--:-- UTC−3	Bou 23' (pen.)		Pittón 54'	Stadium: Ciudad de Lanús

22 September 2024 15	Huracán	3–0	Lanús	Buenos Aires
--:-- UTC−3	Soñora 6'; Echeverría 52'; Ramírez 54'			Stadium: Estadio Tomás Adolfo Ducó

30 September 2024 16	Lanús	0–0	Gimnasia y Esgrima (LP)	Lanús
--:-- UTC−3				Stadium: Ciudad de Lanús

5 October 2024 17	Newell's Old Boys	2–1	Lanús	Rosario
--:-- UTC−3	Ramírez 64'; Miljevic 90+3'		Moreno 54'	Stadium: Estadio Marcelo Bielsa

18 October 2024 18	Lanús	0–2	Independiente	Lanús
--:-- UTC−3			Mancuello 54'; Ávalos 79'	Stadium: Ciudad de Lanús; Attendance: 10,000

27 October 2024 19	Tucumán	1–0	Lanús	Tucumán
--:-- UTC−3	Coronel 26'			Stadium: Estadio Monumental José Fierro

3 November 2024 20	Lanús	1–0	Boca Juniors	Lanús
19:30 UTC−3	Salvio 78'	Report		Stadium: Ciudad de Lanús; Referee: Facundo Tello

7 November 2024 21	Talleres de Córdoba	1–2	Lanús	Córdoba
--:-- UTC−3	Palacios 26'		Moreno 39'; Muñoz 63'	Stadium: Estadio Mario Alberto Kempes

11 November 2024 22	Lanús	0–0	Platense	Lanús
--:-- UTC−3				Stadium: Ciudad de Lanús

20 November 2024 23	Vélez Sarsfield	0–0	Lanús	Buenos Aires
--:-- UTC−3				Stadium: José Amalfitani Stadium

24 November 2024 24	Lanús	0–0	Defensa y Justicia	Lanús
--:-- UTC−3				Stadium: Ciudad de Lanús

30 November 2024 25	Banfield	0–1	Lanús	Banfield
--:-- UTC−3			Díaz 82'	Stadium: Estadio Florencio Sola

7 December 2024 26	Lanús	2–0	Instituto	Lanús
--:-- UTC−3	Torres 52'; Aquino 74'			Stadium: Ciudad de Lanús

13 December 2024 27	Barracas Central	3–3	Lanús	Buenos Aires
--:-- UTC−3	Bruera 4'; Insúa 58'; Cantero 69'		Biafore 7'; Salvio 47'; Bou 60'	Stadium: Estadio Tomás Adolfo Ducó

=== Copa de la Liga Profesional ===
==== Group stage ====
Pos	Team	Pld	W	D	L	GF	GA	GD	Pts	Qualification
1	Godoy Cruz	14	9	2	3	16	6	+10	29	Advance to quarter-finals
2	Estudiantes (LP)	14	8	3	3	19	9	+10	27	Advance to quarter-finals
3	Defensa y Justicia	14	7	5	2	17	13	+4	26	Advance to quarter-finals
4	Boca Juniors	14	7	4	3	20	12	+8	25	Advance to quarter-finals
5	Racing	14	7	3	4	24	11	+13	24	
6	Lanús	14	7	2	5	20	14	+6	23	
7	Newell's Old Boys	14	6	3	5	13	15	−2	21	
8	Unión	14	5	5	4	16	14	+2	20	
9	Platense	14	4	6	4	10	14	−4	18	
10	San Lorenzo	14	3	7	4	10	14	−4	16	
11	Belgrano	14	3	5	6	19	21	−2	14	
12	Central Córdoba (SdE)	14	2	5	7	10	20	−10	11	
13	Sarmiento (J)	14	2	3	9	9	19	−10	9	
14	Tigre	14	1	2	11	7	25	−18	5	

Source: AFA

==== Results summary ====
Overall								Home						Away					
Pld	W	D	L	GF	GA	GD	Pts	W	D	L	GF	GA	GD	W	D	L	GF	GA	GD
14	7	2	5	20	14	+6	23	2	2	3	9	9	0	5	0	2	11	5	+6

==== Matches ====
27 January 2024 1	San Lorenzo	0–2	Lanús	Buenos Aires
--:-- UTC−3		Report		Stadium: Estadio Pedro Bidegain

30 January 2024 2	Lanús	0–2	Newell's Old Boys	Lanús
--:-- UTC−3		Report		Stadium: Ciudad de Lanús

5 February 2024 3	Godoy Cruz	1–0	Lanús	Mendoza
--:-- UTC−3		Report

11 February 2024 4	Lanús	3–0	Platense	Lanús
--:-- UTC−3		Report		Stadium: Ciudad de Lanús

14 February 2024 5	Sarmiento	0–1	Lanús	Junín
--:-- UTC−3		Report

18 February 2024 6	Lanús	2–1	Boca Juniors	Lanús
21:30 UTC−3	Bou 13'; Lotti 75'	Report	Blondel 90+4'	Stadium: Ciudad de Lanús; Referee: Silvio Trucco

25 February 2024 7	Lanús	1–1	Banfield	Lanús
--:-- UTC−3		Report		Stadium: Ciudad de Lanús

3 March 2024 8	Defensa y Justicia	0–4	Lanús	Florencio Varela
--:-- UTC−3		Report		Stadium: Estadio Norberto "Tito" Tomaghello

7 March 2024 9	Lanús	0–1	Central Córdoba	Lanús
--:-- UTC−3		Report		Stadium: Ciudad de Lanús

11 March 2024 10	Tigre	2–3	Lanús	Victoria
--:-- UTC−3		Report		Stadium: Estadio José Dellagiovanna

20 March 2024 11	Belgrano	0–1	Lanús	Córdoba
--:-- UTC−3		Report		Stadium: El Gigante de Alberdi

27 March 2024 12	Lanús	2–2	Unión de Santa Fe	Lanús
--:-- UTC−3		Report		Stadium: Ciudad de Lanús

7 April 2024 13	Racing	2–0	Lanús	Avellaneda
--:-- UTC−3		Report		Stadium: El Cilindro

16 April 2024 14	Lanús	1–2	Estudiantes	Lanús
--:-- UTC−3		Report		Stadium: Ciudad de Lanús

=== Copa Argentina ===
==== Round of 64 ====
15 March 2024	Lanús	0–1	El Porvenir	Florencio Varela
17:00		Report	Quinteros 17'	Stadium: Norberto "Tito" Tomaghello; Referee: Brian Ferreyra

=== Copa Sudamericana ===
==== Group stage ====
The draw for the group stage was held on 18 March 2024, 20:00 PYST (UTC−3), at the CONMEBOL Convention Centre in Luque, Paraguay.

Pos	Team	Pld	W	D	L	GF	GA	GD	Pts	Qualification	LAN	CUI	GAR	MET
1	(Argentina) Lanús	6	4	1	1	12	3	+9	13	Advance to round of 16	—	0–1	2–1	5–0
2	(Brazil) Cuiabá	6	3	3	0	9	3	+6	12	Advance to knockout round play-offs	1–1	—	1–1	3–0
3	(Peru) Deportivo Garcilaso	6	1	3	2	7	9	−2	6		0–2	1–1	—	3–2
4	(Venezuela) Metropolitanos	6	0	1	5	3	16	−13	1		0–2	0–2	1–1	—

Source: CONMEBOL

3 April 2024 1	Cuiabá (Brazil)	1–1	(Argentina) Lanús	Cuiabá, Brazil
18:00 UTC−4	Fernando Sobral 57'	Report	Lotti 80'	Stadium: Arena Pantanal; Attendance: 5,250; Referee: Gery Vargas (Bolivia)

11 April 2024 2	Lanús (Argentina)	2–1	(Peru) Deportivo Garcilaso	Lanús, Argentina
19:00 UTC−3	Peña Biafore 26'; Bou 63'	Report	Erustes 45+4'	Stadium: Estadio Ciudad de Lanús; Referee: José Méndez (Paraguay)

25 April 2024 3	Metropolitanos (Venezuela)	0–2	(Argentina) Lanús	Caracas, Venezuela
18:00 UTC−4		Report	Bou 29', 34'	Stadium: Estadio Olímpico de la UCV; Attendance: 1,523; Referee: Jhon Ospina (Colombia)

9 May 2024 4	Deportivo Garcilaso (Peru)	0–2	(Argentina) Lanús	Cusco, Peru
21:00 UTC−5		Report	Bou 7'; Moreno 54'	Stadium: Estadio Garcilaso; Attendance: 5,292; Referee: Gery Vargas (Bolivia)

15 May 2024 5	Lanús (Argentina)	5–0	(Venezuela) Metropolitanos	Lanús, Argentina
19:00 UTC−3	Cuero 5' (o.g.); Bou 23', 55'; Álvarez 52'; Watson 76'	Report		Stadium: Estadio Ciudad de Lanús; Attendance: 3,711; Referee: Jhon Hinestroza (Colombia)

29 May 2024 6	Lanús (Argentina)	0–1	(Brazil) Cuiabá	Lanús, Argentina
19:00 UTC−3		Report	Pitta 51'	Stadium: Estadio Ciudad de Lanús; Attendance: 2,905; Referee: Gery Vargas (Bolivia)

==== Round of 16 ====
14 August 2024 First Leg	LDU Quito (Ecuador)	1–2	(Argentina) Lanús	Quito, Ecuador
19:30 UTC−5	Arce 14'	Report	Pérez 23'; Moreno 45+1'	Stadium: Estadio Rodrigo Paz Delgado; Attendance: 18,662; Referee: Juan Benítez (Paraguay)

21 August 2024 Second Leg	Lanús (Argentina)	3–1 (5–2 agg.)	(Ecuador) LDU Quito	Lanús, Argentina
21:30 UTC−3	Bou 9'; Izquierdoz 78'; Acosta 89'	Report	Arce 37'	Stadium: Estadio Ciudad de Lanús; Attendance: 5,899; Referee: Kevin Ortega (Peru)

==== Quarter-finals ====
18 September 2024 First Leg	Lanús (Argentina)	0–0	(Colombia) Independiente Medellín	Lanús, Argentina
21:30 UTC−3		Report		Stadium: Estadio Ciudad de Lanús; Attendance: 9,547; Referee: Wilton Sampaio (Brazil)

25 September 2024 Second Leg	Independiente Medellín (Colombia)	1–1 (1–1 agg.) (5–6 p)	(Argentina) Lanús	Medellín, Colombia
19:30 UTC−5	García 61'	Report	Londoño 39' (o.g.)	Stadium: Estadio Atanasio Girardot; Attendance: 25,923; Referee: Alexis Herrera (Venezuela)
	Penalties
	L. Chaverra (penalty scored); F. Chaverra (penalty scored); Lima (penalty missed); Sandoval (penalty scored); Aja (penalty scored); Fory (penalty scored); Mosquera (penalty missed)		(penalty scored) Bou; (penalty missed) Izquierdoz; (penalty scored) Salvio; (penalty scored) Soler; (penalty scored) Peña Biafore; (penalty scored) Torres; (penalty scored) M. Moreno

==== Semi-finals ====
23 October 2024 First Leg	Cruzeiro (Brazil)	1–1	(Argentina) Lanús	Belo Horizonte, Brazil
19:00 UTC−3	Kaio Jorge 50'	Report	Carrera 73'	Stadium: Mineirão; Attendance: 57,158; Referee: Andrés Matonte (Uruguay)

30 October 2024 Second Leg	Lanús (Argentina)	0–1 (1–2 agg.)	(Brazil) Cruzeiro	Lanús, Argentina
19:00 UTC−3		Report	Kaio Jorge 45+1'	Stadium: Estadio Ciudad de Lanús; Attendance: 29,589; Referee: Juan Benítez (Paraguay)
