= Dylan Glaby =

Argentine footballer

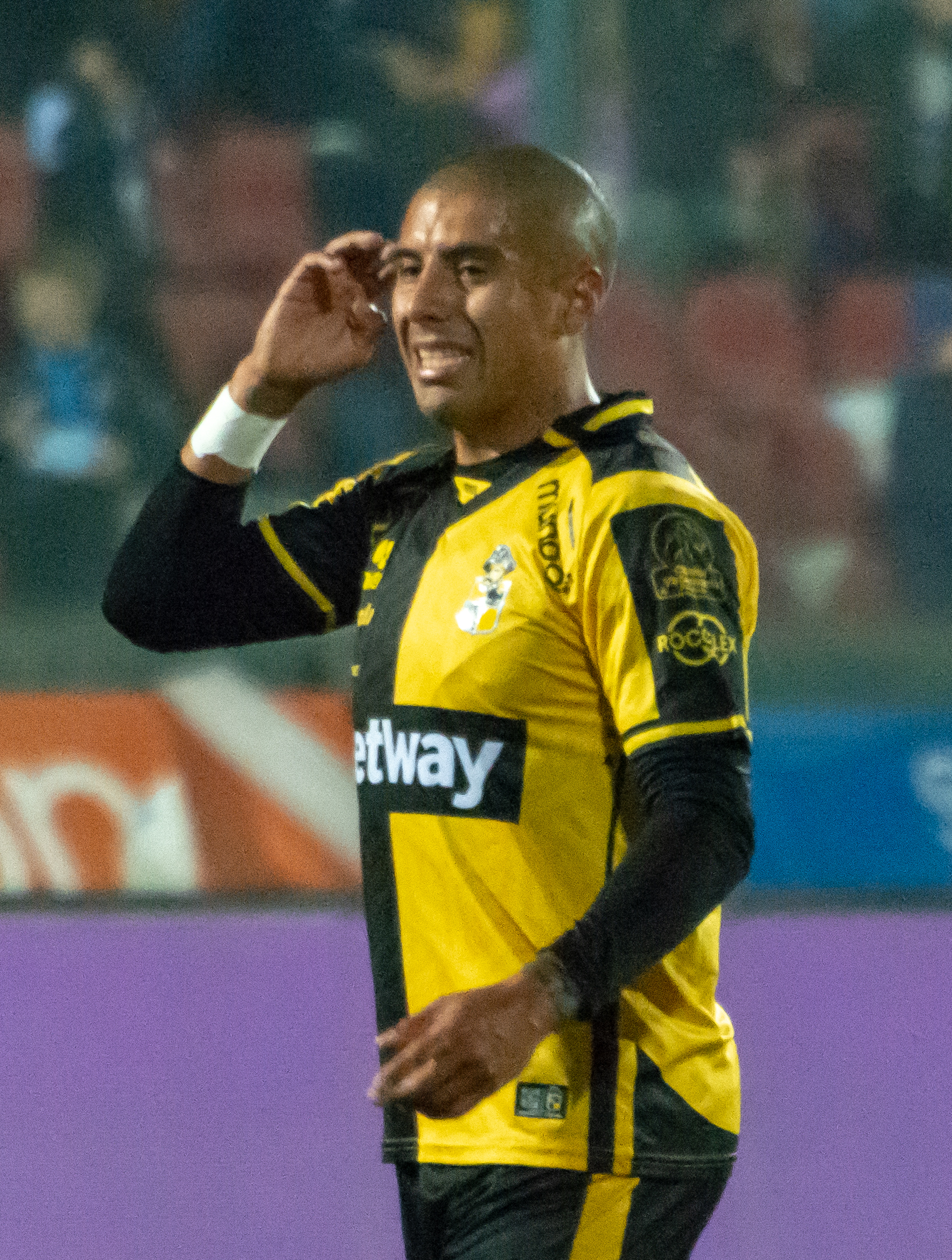
- Glaby with Coquimbo Unido in 2023

Personal information
- Full name: Dylan Emanuel Glaby
- Date of birth: 7 April 1996 (age 30)
- Place of birth: Rafael Castillo, Buenos Aires, Argentina
- Height: 1.78 m (5 ft 10 in)
- Position: Defensive midfielder

Team information
- Current team: Palestino (on loan from Coquimbo Unido)

Youth career
- 2000–2006: Carlos Casares
- 2006–2014: Boca Juniors
- 2015–2016: Vélez Sarsfield

Senior career*
Years	Team	Apps	(Gls)
2016	Juventud Las Piedras	0	(0)
2017–2018	Real Pilar	27	(0)
2018–2019	Argentino de Merlo	24	(0)
2019–2022	Deportivo Morón	14	(0)
2021–2022	→ Barracas Central (loan)	67	(7)
2023–	Coquimbo Unido	70	(3)
2025	→ Central Córdoba SdE (loan)	12	(0)
2025	→ Barracas Central (loan)	1	(0)
2026–	→ Palestino (loan)	0	(0)
- * Club domestic league appearances and goals as of 7 August 2026

Dylan Emanuel Glaby (born 7 April 1996) is an Argentine professional footballer who plays as a defensive midfielder for Chilean club Palestino on loan from Coquimbo Unido.

== Club career ==
As a child, Glaby was with club Carlos Casares from Rafael Castillo and switched to Boca Juniors in 2006, staying with them until 2014. After he had brief stints with Vélez Sarsfield and the Uruguayan side Juventud Las Piedras in 2016.

From 2017 to 2019, he played for the Primera D clubs Real Pilar and Argentino de Merlo, winning the league title in 2018–19.

After a stint with Deportivo Morón (2019–21), Glaby joined Barracas Central on loan, getting the promotion to the Argentine Primera División in 2021.

In 2023, Glaby signed with Chilean Primera División side Coquimbo Unido. In January 2025, he returned to Argentina and joined Central Córdoba de Santiago del Estero on a one-year loan with an option to buy. He switched to Barracas Central in July of the same year.

Back to Coquimbo Unido in 2026, Glaby was loaned out to Palestino for the second half of the year.

== Honours ==
Argentino de Merlo

- Primera D: 2018–19

Coquimbo Unido

- Supercopa de Chile: 2026
