= Gabriel Robledo =

Argentine professional footballer

Personal information
- Full name: Gabriel Alejandro Robledo
- Date of birth: 14 June 1993 (age 33)
- Place of birth: Rafael Castillo, Argentina
- Height: 1.75 m (5 ft 9 in)
- Position: Midfielder

Team information
- Current team: Deportivo Laferrere

Senior career*
Years	Team	Apps	(Gls)
2014–2016	Huracán	2	(0)
2016–2019	Deportivo Español	72	(1)
2019–2020	San Telmo	12	(1)
2021	Deportivo Camioneros	4	(0)
2022–	Deportivo Laferrere	12	(1)
- * Club domestic league appearances and goals as of 19:17, 31 July 2022 (UTC)

Gabriel Alejandro Robledo (born 14 June 1993) is an Argentine professional footballer who plays as a midfielder for Deportivo Laferrere.

== Career ==
Robledo's career started with Huracán. He made the breakthrough into their first-team during the 2014 campaign, making his debut on 25 September in a Copa Argentina encounter with Banfield before appearing in league football for the first time in October versus Independiente Rivadavia. Huracán won promotion in 2014 to the Primera División, a league he featured once in; against Godoy Cruz on 27 February 2015. Robledo didn't appear again, leaving in 2016 to Deportivo Español of Primera B Metropolitana. He scored his first goal in May 2017 versus Villa San Carlos, in the midst of seventy-five games in three seasons.

In August 2019, Robledo completed a move to San Telmo.

== Career statistics ==
As of 29 August 2020.

Appearances and goals by club, season and competition
Club	Season	League			Cup		League Cup		Continental		Other		Total	
Club	Season	Division	Apps	Goals	Apps	Goals	Apps	Goals	Apps	Goals	Apps	Goals	Apps	Goals
Huracán	2014	Primera B Nacional	1	0	1	0	—		—		0	0	2	0
Huracán	2015	Primera División	1	0	0	0	—		—		0	0	1	0
Huracán	2016	Primera División	0	0	0	0	—		0	0	0	0	0	0
Huracán	Total		2	0	1	0	—		0	0	0	0	3	0
Deportivo Español	2016–17	Primera B Metropolitana	22	1	0	0	—		—		3 (Note: Appearance(s) in the Primera B Metropolitana play-offs)	0	25	1
Deportivo Español	2017–18	Primera B Metropolitana	24	0	0	0	—		—		0	0	24	0
Deportivo Español	2018–19	Primera B Metropolitana	26	0	0	0	—		—		0	0	26	0
Deportivo Español	Total		72	1	0	0	—		—		3	0	75	1
San Telmo	2019–20	Primera B Metropolitana	12	1	0	0	—		—		0	0	12	1
Career total			86	2	1	0	—		0	0	3	0	90	2

== Honours ==
Huracán

- Copa Argentina: 2013–14
