= Rodrigo Castillo =

Argentine footballer

Personal information
- Full name: Rodrigo Sebastián Castillo
- Date of birth: 26 February 1999 (age 27)
- Place of birth: Venado Tuerto, Argentina
- Height: 1.87 m (6 ft 2 in)
- Position: Forward

Team information
- Current team: Fluminense
- Number: 19

Youth career
- Sportivo Rivadavia
- 2018–2019: River Plate
- 2020–2021: Unión Santa Fe
- 2021: → Gimnasia La Plata (loan)

Senior career*
Years	Team	Apps	(Gls)
2022–2025	Gimnasia La Plata	60	(11)
2022	→ Deportivo Madryn (loan)	33	(12)
2025–2026	Lanús	21	(8)
2026–	Fluminense	2	(0)
- * Club domestic league appearances and goals as of 21:18, 16 March 2026 (UTC)

Rodrigo Sebastián Castillo (born 26 February 1999) is an Argentine footballer who plays as a forward for Campeonato Brasileiro Série A side Fluminense.

== Club career ==
=== Early career ===
Born in Venado Tuerto, Santa Fe, Castillo began his career with hometown side Sportivo Rivadavia before joining the youth sides of River Plate. After playing for the reserve team in 2019, he moved to Unión de Santa Fe in the following year, also for the reserve squad.

On 18 February 2021, Castillo moved to Gimnasia La Plata on loan. After impressing with the reserve side, he signed a permanent deal with the club for the 2022 season.

=== Gimnasia La Plata ===
==== Loan to Deportivo Madryn ====
On 10 January 2022, however, after being deemed surplus to requirements by manager Néstor Gorosito, Castillo was loaned to Primera Nacional side Deportivo Madryn. He made his professional debut on 12 February, coming on as a late substitute and scoring the winner in a 1–0 home success over Agropecuario. He impressed with the side during the season, scoring 12 goals.

==== Breakthrough ====
Back to Gimnasia in January 2023, Castillo made his club – and Primera División – debut on 30 January, starting in a 3–1 away loss to Vélez Sarsfield. He renewed his contract until December 2025 on 23 March, and scored his first goal in the top tier on 16 July, but in a 3–1 home loss to Boca Juniors.

On 24 September 2024, after establishing himself as a first-choice, Castillo further extended his link until the end of 2026.

=== Lanús ===
On 7 July 2025, Castillo moved to fellow top-tier side Lanús on a three-and-a-half-year contract. An immediate starter, he helped the side to reach the 2025 Copa Sudamericana final by scoring all his side's three goals in the semifinals against Universidad de Chile.

=== Fluminense ===
On 3 March 2026, Campeonato Brasileiro Série A side Fluminense announced the signing of Castillo on a five-year contract.

== Career statistics ==
As of 16 March 2026.

Club	Season	League			Cup		Continental		Other		Total	
Club	Season	Division	Apps	Goals	Apps	Goals	Apps	Goals	Apps	Goals	Apps	Goals
Deportivo Madryn	2022	Primera Nacional	33	12	3	0	—		—		36	12
Gimnasia La Plata	2023	Primera División	13 (Note: Soccerway counts Copa de la Liga Profesional appearances as league appearances.)	1	1	0	0	0	—		14	1
Gimnasia La Plata	2024	Primera División	31	6	4	0	—		—		35	6
Gimnasia La Plata	2025	Primera División	16	4	2	1	—		—		18	5
Gimnasia La Plata	Total		60	11	7	1	0	0	—		67	12
Lanús	2025	Primera División	16	7	2	0	7 (Note: Appearance(s) in Copa Sudamericana)	3	—		25	10
Lanús	2026	Primera División	5	1	1	1	0	0	2 (Note: Appearance(s) in Recopa Sudamericana)	2	8	4
Lanús	Total		21	8	3	1	7	3	2	2	33	14
Fluminense	2026	Série A	0	0	0	0	0	0	—		0	0
Career total			114	31	13	2	7	3	2	2	136	38

== Honours ==
Lanús

- Copa Sudamericana: 2025
- Recopa Sudamericana: 2026

Individual

- Copa Sudamericana Team of the Tournament: 2025
