= Leonardo Heredia =

Argentine footballer (born 1996)

Personal information
- Full name: Leonardo Matías Heredia
- Date of birth: 11 January 1996 (age 30)
- Place of birth: Lomas del Mirador, Argentina
- Height: 1.85 m (6 ft 1 in)
- Position: Midfielder

Team information
- Current team: Platense (on loan from Argentinos Juniors)
- Number: 23

Senior career*
Years	Team	Apps	(Gls)
2014–2017	Almirante Brown	54	(12)
2017–2020	Boston River	0	(0)
2017–2019	→ Colón (loan)	2	(5)
2019–2020	→ Atlético Tucumán (loan)	12	(1)
2020–2024	Atlético Tucumán	53	(7)
2022	→ Estudiantes (loan)	19	(1)
2023	→ Argentinos Juniors (loan)	30	(6)
2024–	Argentinos Juniors	23	(3)
2025	→ Central Córdoba SdE (loan)	31	(6)
2026–	→ Platense (loan)	19	(0)
- * Club domestic league appearances and goals as of 17:15, 22 November 2026 (UTC)

Leonardo Matías Heredia (born 11 January 1996) is an Argentine professional footballer who plays as a midfielder for Platense, on loan from Argentinos Juniors.

== Career ==
Heredia's first club were Almirante Brown. He made his professional debut in Primera B Nacional in June 2014 versus Huracán, after being an unused substitute for four matches during the previous May. The club were relegated in 2013–14 to Primera B Metropolitana. Twenty appearances later, Heredia scored his first career goal in a 3–1 win over Tristán Suárez on 17 May 2016. In August 2017, Heredia's rights were sold to a business group who later assigned the midfielder to Uruguayan club Boston River. He was immediately loaned to Colón back in his homeland, where he'd remain for two full seasons.

Heredia joined Atlético Tucumán on loan ahead of the 2019–20 season. He made his debut on 4 September in a Copa Argentina win over Boca Unidos, with his first goal arriving in November against San Lorenzo. He subsequently scored two goals in the Copa Libertadores in the succeeding February, netting in victories versus The Strongest and Independiente Medellín respectively. In September 2020, Heredia was signed permanently by Atlético Tucumán; he penned a four-year contract. On 27 June 2022 it was confirmed, that Heredia had joined fellow league club Estudiantes de La Plata on loan for the rest of the year with a purchase option.

== Career statistics ==
As of 28 September 2020.

Club statistics
Club	Season	League			Cup		League Cup		Continental		Other		Total	
Club	Season	Division	Apps	Goals	Apps	Goals	Apps	Goals	Apps	Goals	Apps	Goals	Apps	Goals
Almirante Brown	2013–14	Primera B Nacional	1	0	1	0	—		—		0	0	2	0
Almirante Brown	2014	Primera B Metropolitana	7	0	2	0	—		—		0	0	9	0
Almirante Brown	2015	Primera B Metropolitana	3	0	0	0	—		—		0	0	3	0
Almirante Brown	2016	Primera B Metropolitana	14	2	0	0	—		—		0	0	14	2
Almirante Brown	2016–17	Primera B Metropolitana	29	10	0	0	—		—		0	0	29	10
Almirante Brown	Total		54	12	3	0	—		—		0	0	57	12
Boston River	2017	Uruguayan Primera División	0	0	—		—		0	0	0	0	0	0
Boston River	2018	Uruguayan Primera División	0	0	—		—		0	0	0	0	0	0
Boston River	2019	Uruguayan Primera División	0	0	—		—		—		0	0	0	0
Boston River	2020	Uruguayan Primera División	0	0	—		—		—		0	0	0	0
Boston River	Total		0	0	—		—		0	0	0	0	0	0
Colón (loan)	2017–18	Argentine Primera División	10	0	1	0	—		0	0	0	0	11	0
Colón (loan)	2018–19	Argentine Primera División	18	5	3	0	0	0	5 (Note: Appearance(s) in the Copa Sudamericana)	0	0	0	26	5
Colón (loan)	Total		28	5	4	0	0	0	5	0	0	0	37	5
Atlético Tucumán (loan)	2019–20	Argentine Primera División	12	1	2	0	0	0	4 (Note: Appearance(s) in the Copa Libertadores)	2	0	0	18	3
Atlético Tucumán	2020–21	Argentine Primera División	0	0	0	0	0	0	—		0	0	0	0
Atlético Tucumán	Total		12	1	2	0	0	0	4	2	0	0	18	3
Career total			94	18	9	0	0	0	9	2	0	0	112	20
