= Gastón Verón =

Argentine footballer (born 2001)

Personal information
- Full name: Gastón Nicolás Verón
- Date of birth: 23 April 2001 (age 25)
- Place of birth: Puerto Vilelas, Chaco, Argentina
- Height: 1.84 m (6 ft 0 in)
- Position: Forward

Team information
- Current team: Argentinos Juniors
- Number: 9

Youth career
- Chaco For Ever
- 2010–2018: Argentinos Juniors

Senior career*
Years	Team	Apps	(Gls)
2018–	Argentinos Juniors	113	(10)
2020–2021	→ Estudiantes BA (loan)	16	(2)
2025	→ Central Córdoba SdE (loan)	27	(7)
- * Club domestic league appearances and goals as of 17:07, 25 July 2026 (UTC)

Gastón Nicolás Verón (born 23 April 2001) is an Argentine footballer currently playing as a forward for Argentinos Juniors.

== Club career ==
Born in Puerto Vilelas in the Chaco Province of Argentina, Verón began his career with Chaco For Ever, before impressive performances at a youth tournament caught the attention of top-flight side Argentinos Juniors, who invited him on a one-month trial. He signed with Argentinos Juniors in 2010, and after being housed in the La Paternal neighbourhood of Buenos Aires, he considered quitting football after two weeks away from home, but changed his mind after speaking with his mother about it.

Having progressed through the academy of Argentinos Juniors, he made his professional debut at the age of sixteen on 28 January 2018, coming on as a second-half substitute for Lucas Barrios in a 2–0 Superliga Argentina win over San Martín de San Juan. After one further appearance in the 2017–18 season, he scored his first goal for the club in the following season, the second in a 2–0 win over Lanús on 1 September 2018, becoming the fourth-youngest goal-scorer for the club at the time. The following month, on 11 October 2018, Verón was included in English newspaper The Guardian as one of the best players born in 2001 worldwide.

Despite a number of appearances in the 2018–19 season, Verón would fail to feature over the next two campaigns, in part due to the COVID-19 pandemic in Argentina, which had led to the cancellation of the 2020–21 season, and in September 2020, he was loaned to Primera Nacional side Estudiantes de Buenos Aires in order to get more experience.

== International career ==
Though not called up to any Argentina squad at youth level, Verón was called up in 2018 for "sparring matches" against the Argentina national football team ahead of the 2018 FIFA World Cup.

== Career statistics ==
=== Club ===
As of 15 October 2023.

Appearances and goals by club, season and competition
Club	Season	League			National Cup		League Cup		Continental		Other		Total	
Club	Season	Division	Apps	Goals	Apps	Goals	Apps	Goals	Apps	Goals	Apps	Goals	Apps	Goals
Argentinos Juniors	2017–18	Superliga Argentina	2	0	0	0	–		–		0	0	2	0
Argentinos Juniors	2018–19	Superliga Argentina	11	1	2 (Note: Appearances in the Copa Argentina)	0	–		–		0	0	13	1
Argentinos Juniors	2019–20	Superliga Argentina	0	0	0	0	–		0	0	0	0	0	0
Argentinos Juniors	2021	Superliga Argentina	0	0	0	0	0	0	–		0	0	0	0
Argentinos Juniors	2022	Superliga Argentina	26	6	2	0	11 (Note: appearances in the Copa de la Liga Profesional)	1	–		1 (Note: appearances in the Copa de la Liga Profesional playoffs)	0	41	7
Argentinos Juniors	2023	Superliga Argentina	24	0	2	2	3	0	8 (Note: Appearances in the Copa Libertadores)	0	0	0	37	2
Argentinos Juniors	Total		64	7	6	2	14	1	8	0	1	0	93	10
Estudiantes BA (loan)	2020–21	Primera Nacional	7	1	1	0	–		–		0	0	8	1
Estudiantes BA (loan)	2021	Primera Nacional	9	1	0	0	–		–		0	0	9	1
Estudiantes BA (loan)	Total		16	2	1	0	0	0	0	0	0	0	17	1
Career total			80	8	7	2	14	1	8	0	1	0	110	11
