= Iván Gómez (footballer, born 1997) =

Argentine footballer

Personal information
- Full name: Iván Gómez
- Date of birth: 28 February 1997 (age 29)
- Place of birth: La Plata, Argentina
- Height: 1.80 m (5 ft 11 in)
- Position: Midfielder

Team information
- Current team: Platense
- Number: 5

Youth career
- Estudiantes

Senior career*
Years	Team	Apps	(Gls)
2016–2024	Estudiantes	75	(2)
2021–2022	→ Platense (loan)	50	(4)
2023	→ Newell's Old Boys (loan)	36	(0)
2024–	Platense	45	(0)
2025	→ Central Córdoba SdE (loan)	21	(2)
- * Club domestic league appearances and goals as of 17:06, 22 November 2026 (UTC)

Iván Gómez (born 28 February 1997) is an Argentine professional footballer who plays as a midfielder for Platense.
