= Nicolás Watson =

Argentine footballer

Personal information
- Full name: Nicolás Ezequiel Watson
- Date of birth: 22 May 1998 (age 28)
- Place of birth: Córdoba, Argentina
- Position: Midfielder

Team information
- Current team: Deportivo Riestra (on loan from Instituto)
- Number: 16

Youth career
- 2010–2018: Instituto

Senior career*
| Years | Team | Apps | (Gls) |
| 2018– | Instituto | 72 | (0) |
| 2022 | → Sport Recife (loan) | 3 | (0) |
| 2024–2025 | → Chacarita Juniors (loan) | 34 | (0) |
| 2025 | → San Martín SJ (loan) | 25 | (0) |
| 2026– | → Deportivo Riestra (loan) | 25 | (0) |
- * Club domestic league appearances and goals as of 17:40, 13 November 2026 (UTC)

Nicolás Ezequiel Watson (born 22 May 1998) is an Argentine professional footballer who plays as a midfielder for Deportivo Riestra, on loan from Instituto.

== Career ==
Watson's senior career began with Instituto, who signed him aged twelve, in Primera B Nacional. Having been an unused substitute for matches with Quilmes, Sarmiento and Brown between December 2018 and February 2019, Watson was selected to start a fixture versus Ferro Carril Oeste on 16 February.

== Personal life ==
Watson is of Italian descent through a grandfather from Palermo. He is the son of former professional footballer Sergio Watson, and brother of the footballer Franco. He has three brothers, all of which played in the Instituto academy.

== Career statistics ==
As of 16 February 2019.

Appearances and goals by club, season and competition
| Club | Season | League | | | Cup | | Continental | | Other | | Total | |
| Club | Season | Division | Apps | Goals | Apps | Goals | Apps | Goals | Apps | Goals | Apps | Goals |
|---|---|---|---|---|---|---|---|---|---|---|---|---|
| Instituto | 2018–19 | Primera B Nacional | 9 | 0 | 0 | 0 | — | | 0 | 0 | 1 | 0 |
| Career total | | | 1 | 0 | 0 | 0 | — | | 0 | 0 | 1 | 0 |
