= Estadio Alfredo Terrera =

Football stadium in Santiago del Estero, Argentina

Alfredo Terrera Stadium
- Estadio Alfredo Terrera

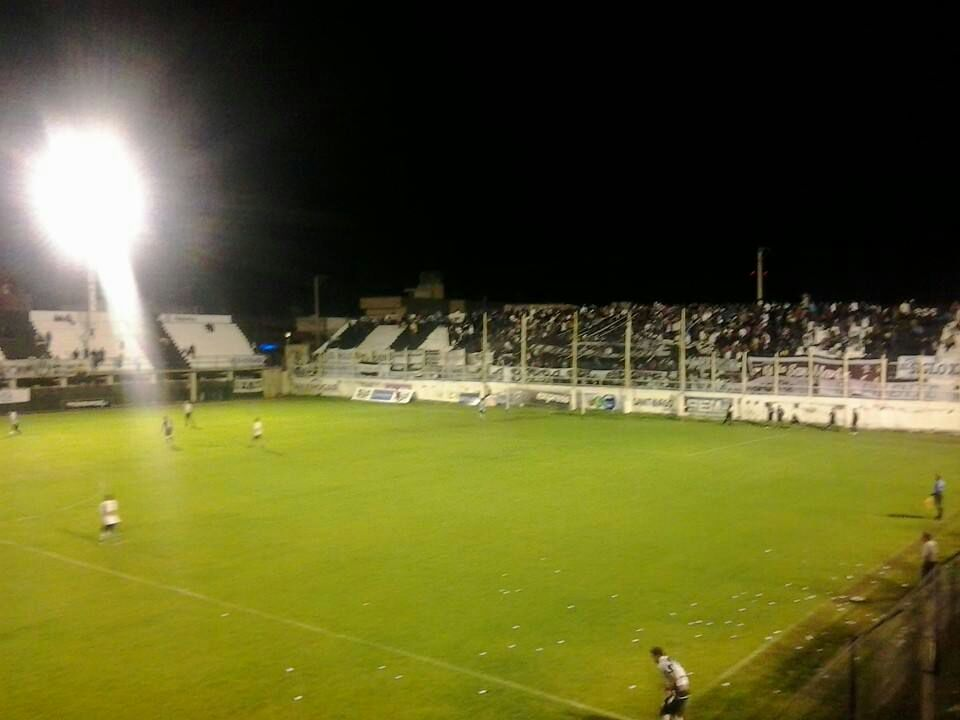
- The stadium in 2014
- Interactive map of Alfredo Terrera Stadium
- Former names: Estadio Víctor Antonio Aguirre
- Address: Granadero Saavedra y San Martín; Santiago del Estero; Argentina
- Coordinates: 27°47′38″S 64°15′51″W
- Owner: Central Córdoba (SdE)
- Capacity: 20,000
- Field size: 105 x 65

Construction
- Built: 1942
- Opened: October 21, 1946; 79 years ago

Tenant
- Central Córdoba (SdE)

Estadio Alfredo Terrera is a stadium located in the city of Santiago del Estero in the homonymous province of Argentina. The stadium was inaugurated on 21 October 1946, has a capacity of 20,000 spectators, and is the home ground of local C.A. Central Córdoba.

The stadium was refurbished after the team promoted to Primera División as the only representative of the province. The stadium's improvements were made to fulfil the requirements of AFA and Conmebol.

== History ==
The first field of Central Córdoba was a land granted by the Brader family. It was located in the "Barrio Villa Dina" close to the Córdoba Central Railway tracks.

In 1920, with Nicanor Salvatierra as major of Santiago del Estero, a land close to Club Santiago was donated. Nevertheless, the club could not use the field for economic reasons. That same year Central Córdoba established in Barrio Oeste, more precisely to a land on 12 de Octobre and Sarmiento streets.

It was not until 1929 when Central Córdoba could get an own land to build their stadium, after Nicanor Salvatierra requested the government of Santiago del Estero the release of a sports field on Pedro Gallo and San Luis (nowadays Granadero Saavedra) streets. The request was approved so the club inaugurated the stadium in 1946. Before the donation, the land was used by students of Colegio Nacional during their physical education classes.

Some stories say that Estadio Alfredo Terrera was erected on a land where a cemetery had previously existed. This belief is based on words from former executives of the club who stated that "a lot of bones were found when the playing surface was levelled". According to their testimonies, "more bones were found where the grandstands were built".

== See also ==
- List of football stadiums in Argentina
- Lists of stadiums
