= 2026 Recopa Sudamericana =

CONMEBOL Recopa Sudamericana 2026
Lanús	Flamengo
(Argentina)	(Brazil)
4	2
- on aggregate

First leg
Lanús	Flamengo
1	0
- Date: 19 February 2026
- Venue: Estadio Ciudad de Lanús, Lanús
- Referee: Alexis Herrera (Venezuela)

Second leg
Flamengo	Lanús
2	3
- Date: 26 February 2026
- Venue: Maracanã, Rio de Janeiro
- Referee: Gustavo Tejera (Uruguay)

The 2026 Recopa Sudamericana (officially the CONMEBOL Recopa 2026) was the 34th edition of the Recopa Sudamericana, the football competition organized by CONMEBOL between the winners of the previous season's two major South American club tournaments, the Copa Libertadores and the Copa Sudamericana.

The competition was contested in a two-legged home-and-away format between Brazilian team Flamengo (winners of the 2025 Copa Libertadores) and Argentine team Lanús (winners of the 2025 Copa Sudamericana). The first leg was hosted by Lanús at Estadio Ciudad de Lanús, in Lanús, Argentina on 19 February 2026, while Flamengo hosted the second leg at Maracanã in Rio de Janeiro, Brazil on 26 February 2026.

Lanús defeated Flamengo 4–2 on aggregate to win their first Recopa Sudamericana.

== Teams ==
This was the third Recopa Sudamericana participation for Flamengo, who previously won the competition in 2020 and lost in 2023, both against Ecuadorian club Independiente del Valle. On the other hand, Lanús played its second Recopa Sudamericana, having been defeated in 2014 by Brazilian side Atlético Mineiro.

Both sides previously faced each other in the group stage of the 2012 Copa Libertadores, in which they were drawn into Group 2 along with Emelec from Ecuador and Paraguayan side Olimpia. Although Flamengo won one match and drew the other one against Lanús, they were eliminated from the competition after placing third in the group, while the Argentine side advanced to the knockout rounds as group winner.

Team	Qualification	Previous appearances (bold indicates winners)
(Brazil) Flamengo	2025 Copa Libertadores winners	2 (**2020**, 2023)
(Argentina) Lanús	2025 Copa Sudamericana winners	1 (2014)

== Format ==
The Recopa Sudamericana was played on a home-and-away two-legged basis, with the Copa Libertadores winners hosting the second leg. If tied on aggregate, 30 minutes of extra time would be played. If still tied, a penalty shoot-out would be used to determine the winners.

== Matches ==
Saúl (Flamengo) missed both legs due to injury. Jorginho (Flamengo) missed the first leg due to injury, and Gonzalo Plata (Flamengo) missed it due to suspension.

=== First leg ===
19 February 2026
21:30 UTC−3

Lanús (Argentina)	1–0	(Brazil) Flamengo
Castillo 77'	Report

Estadio Ciudad de Lanús, Lanús
Referee: Alexis Herrera (Venezuela)

**Lanús**	**Flamengo**

GK	26	(Argentina) Nahuel Losada
RB	33	(Argentina) Tomás Guidara
CB	24	(Argentina) Carlos Izquierdoz (c)
CB	13	(Paraguay) José Canale
LB	6	(Argentina) Sasha Marcich	(yellow card) 52'
CM	17	(Argentina) Agustín Medina		(substituted off) 82'
CM	30	(Argentina) Agustín Cardozo
RW	11	(Argentina) Eduardo Salvio		(substituted off) 66'
AM	10	(Argentina) Marcelino Moreno		(substituted off) 88'
LW	23	(Argentina) Ramiro Carrera		(substituted off) 66'
CF	19	(Argentina) Rodrigo Castillo		(substituted off) 88'
Substitutes:
GK	1	(Argentina) Franco Petroli
DF	3	(Argentina) Nicolás Morgantini
DF	4	(Uruguay) Gonzalo Pérez
DF	35	(Paraguay) Ronaldo Dejesús
MF	5	(Argentina) Felipe Peña Biafore		(substituted on) 82'
MF	8	(Argentina) Franco Watson		(substituted on) 88'
MF	16	(Chile) Matías Sepúlveda		(substituted on) 66'
FW	9	(Argentina) Walter Bou		(substituted on) 88'
FW	20	(Argentina) Bruno Cabrera
FW	25	(Argentina) Dylan Aquino		(substituted on) 66'
FW	37	(Argentina) Thomás de Martis
FW	77	(Argentina) Lucas Besozzi
Manager:
(Argentina) Mauricio Pellegrino

GK	1	(Argentina) Agustín Rossi
RB	2	(Uruguay) Guillermo Varela
CB	3	(Brazil) Léo Ortiz
CB	4	(Brazil) Léo Pereira
LB	26	(Brazil) Alex Sandro
CM	5	(Chile) Erick Pulgar
CM	20	(Brazil) Lucas Paquetá
RW	15	(Colombia) Jorge Carrascal	(yellow card) 79'
AM	10	(Uruguay) Giorgian de Arrascaeta (c)		(substituted off) 58'
LW	11	(Brazil) Everton		(substituted off) 58'
CF	7	(Brazil) Luiz Araújo		(substituted off) 77'
Substitutes:
GK	42	(Brazil) Andrew
DF	6	(Brazil) Ayrton Lucas
DF	13	(Brazil) Danilo
DF	22	(Brazil) Emerson Royal
DF	44	(Brazil) Vitão
DF	51	(Brazil) Daniel Sales
MF	18	(Uruguay) Nicolás de la Cruz		(substituted on) 77'
MF	52	(Brazil) Evertton Araújo
FW	9	(Brazil) Pedro		(substituted on) 58'
FW	16	(Brazil) Samuel Lino		(substituted on) 58'
FW	27	(Brazil) Bruno Henrique
FW	81	(Brazil) Douglas Telles
Manager:
(Brazil) Filipe Luís

Assistant referees:
Jorge Urrego (Venezuela)
Lubin Torrealba (Venezuela)
Fourth official:
Yender Herrera (Venezuela)
Fifth official:
Erizon Nieto (Venezuela)
Video assistant referee:
Carlos Orbe (Ecuador)
Assistant video assistant referees:
Christian Lescano (Ecuador)
Franklin Congo (Ecuador)
Ángel Arteaga (Venezuela)

Match rules:

- 90 minutes.
- Twelve named substitutes, of which up to five may be used.

=== Second leg ===
26 February 2026
21:30 UTC−3

Flamengo (Brazil)	2–3 (a.e.t.)	(Argentina) Lanús
De Arrascaeta 37' (pen.); Jorginho 85' (pen.)	Report	Castillo 29'; Canale 118'; Aquino 120+2'

Maracanã, Rio de Janeiro
Attendance: 64,470
Referee: Gustavo Tejera (Uruguay)

**Flamengo**	**Lanús**

GK	1	(Argentina) Agustín Rossi
RB	2	(Uruguay) Guillermo Varela		(substituted off) 75'
CB	13	(Brazil) Danilo		(substituted off) 92'
CB	4	(Brazil) Léo Pereira
LB	6	(Brazil) Ayrton Lucas
CM	5	(Chile) Erick Pulgar	(yellow card) 88'
CM	52	(Brazil) Evertton Araújo		(substituted off) 64'
RW	15	(Colombia) Jorge Carrascal		(substituted off) 58'
AM	10	(Uruguay) Giorgian de Arrascaeta (c)
LW	16	(Brazil) Samuel Lino		(substituted off) 57'
CF	19	(Ecuador) Gonzalo Plata		(substituted off) 64'
Substitutes:
GK	42	(Brazil) Andrew
DF	3	(Brazil) Léo Ortiz		(substituted on) 92'
DF	22	(Brazil) Emerson Royal
DF	26	(Brazil) Alex Sandro
DF	44	(Brazil) Vitão
MF	18	(Uruguay) Nicolás de la Cruz
MF	20	(Brazil) Lucas Paquetá	(yellow card) 120+1'	(substituted on) 64'
MF	21	(Italy) Jorginho		(substituted on) 64'
FW	7	(Brazil) Luiz Araújo
FW	9	(Brazil) Pedro		(substituted on) 58'
FW	11	(Brazil) Everton		(substituted on) 57'
FW	27	(Brazil) Bruno Henrique		(substituted on) 75'
Manager:
(Brazil) Filipe Luís

GK	26	(Argentina) Nahuel Losada
RB	33	(Argentina) Tomás Guidara	(yellow card) 105'	(substituted off) 106'
CB	24	(Argentina) Carlos Izquierdoz (c)
CB	13	(Paraguay) José Canale
LB	6	(Argentina) Sasha Marcich
CM	17	(Argentina) Agustín Medina
CM	30	(Argentina) Agustín Cardozo		(substituted off) 96'
RW	11	(Argentina) Eduardo Salvio		(substituted off) 64'
AM	10	(Argentina) Marcelino Moreno		(substituted off) 69'
LW	23	(Argentina) Ramiro Carrera	(yellow card) 69'	(substituted off) 70'
CF	19	(Argentina) Rodrigo Castillo		(substituted off) 96'
Substitutes:
GK	1	(Argentina) Franco Petroli
DF	3	(Argentina) Nicolás Morgantini
DF	4	(Uruguay) Gonzalo Pérez		(substituted on) 106'
DF	35	(Paraguay) Ronaldo Dejesús
MF	5	(Argentina) Felipe Peña Biafore		(substituted on) 96'
MF	8	(Argentina) Franco Watson
MF	16	(Chile) Matías Sepúlveda		(substituted on) 64'
FW	9	(Argentina) Walter Bou		(substituted on) 96'
FW	20	(Argentina) Bruno Cabrera
FW	25	(Argentina) Dylan Aquino		(substituted on) 69'
FW	37	(Argentina) Thomás de Martis
FW	77	(Argentina) Lucas Besozzi		(substituted on) 70'
Manager:
(Argentina) Mauricio Pellegrino

Assistant referees:
Nicolás Tarán (Uruguay)
Carlos Barreiro (Uruguay)
Fourth official:
José Burgos (Uruguay)
Fifth official:
Andrés Nievas (Uruguay)
Video assistant referee:
Andrés Cunha (Uruguay)
Assistant video assistant referees:
Miguel Araos (Chile)
Richard Trinidad (Uruguay)
José Cabero (Chile)

Match rules:

- 90 minutes.
- 30 minutes of extra time if tied on aggregate (away goals rule not applied).
- Penalty shoot-out if still tied on aggregate after extra time.
- Twelve named substitutes.
- Maximum of five substitutions, with a sixth allowed in extra time.

== See also ==
- 2025 Copa Libertadores
- 2025 Copa Sudamericana
