= Puerto Vilelas =

Coordinates: 27°31′S 58°56′W

- Municipality and village
- Interactive map of Puerto Vilelas
- Country: Argentina
- Province: Chaco Province
- Time zone: UTC−3 (ART)

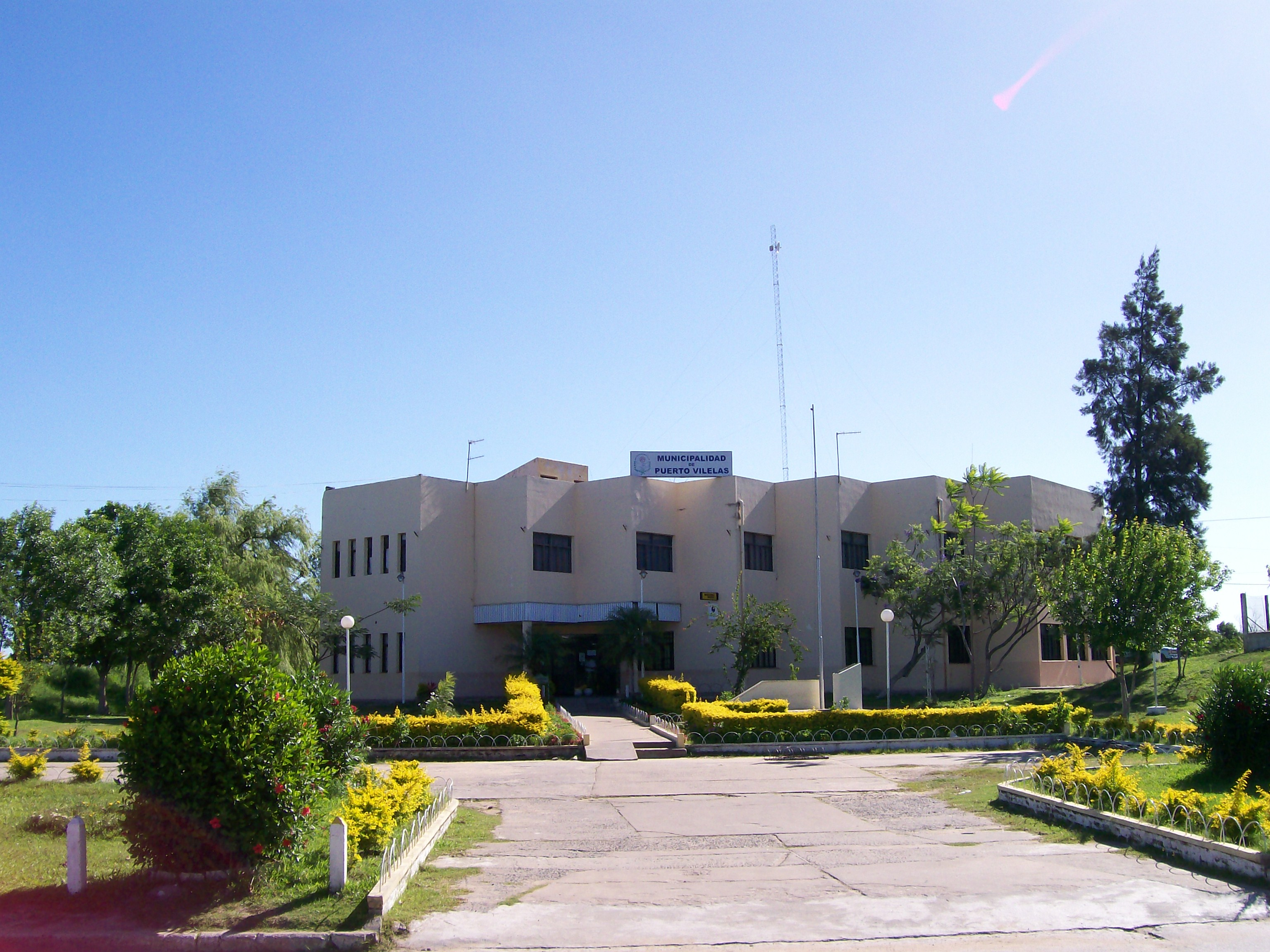
Puerto Vilelas

Puerto Vilelas is a village and municipality in Chaco Province, in northern Argentina.
