= Lucas Varaldo =

Argentine footballer (born 2002)

Personal information
- Full name: Lucas Ariel Varaldo
- Date of birth: 24 February 2002 (age 24)
- Place of birth: Lomas de Zamora, Argentina
- Height: 1.76 m (5 ft 9 in)
- Position: Forward

Team information
- Current team: Central Córdoba SdE
- Number: 9

Youth career
- Lanús

Senior career*
| Years | Team | Apps | (Gls) |
| 2020–2024 | Lanús | 18 | (1) |
| 2023 | → Almagro (loan) | 10 | (1) |
| 2024 | → Aldosivi (loan) | 4 | (0) |
| 2024– | Central Córdoba SdE | 41 | (4) |

International career
| 2019 | Argentina U17 | 1 | (0) |
- * Club domestic league appearances and goals as of 17:19, 12 November 2026 (UTC)

Lucas Ariel Varaldo (born 24 February 2002) is an Argentine professional footballer who plays as a forward for Central Córdoba SdE.

== Club career ==
Varaldo, having joined at the age of six, is a product of the Lanús youth system, notably scoring a hat-trick against Estudiantes in February 2020 as their reserves won the title. He made the breakthrough into Luis Zubeldía's first-team squad in the following December, initially appearing on the substitute's bench for a Copa de la Liga Profesional victory away to Aldosivi on 13 December. Varaldo's senior debut arrived on 20 December in the same competition versus Defensa y Justicia, after the forward replaced Gonzalo Torres with seventeen minutes left of an eventual 1–1 draw.

In June 2024, Varaldo joined Central Córdoba SdE, signing a contract until 2026.

== International career ==
In 2019, Varaldo was selected by Pablo Aimar for the 2019 FIFA U-17 World Cup in Brazil. He appeared just once, against Tajikistan, as Argentina exited at the round of sixteen.

== Career statistics ==
As of 20 December 2020.

Appearances and goals by club, season and competition
| Club | Season | League | | | Cup | | League Cup | | Continental | | Other | | Total | |
| Club | Season | Division | Apps | Goals | Apps | Goals | Apps | Goals | Apps | Goals | Apps | Goals | Apps | Goals |
|---|---|---|---|---|---|---|---|---|---|---|---|---|---|---|
| Lanús | 2020–21 (Note: Soccerway counts Copa de la Liga Profesional appearances as league appearances.) | Primera División | 1 | 0 | 0 | 0 | 0 | 0 | 0 | 0 | 0 | 0 | 1 | 0 |
| Career total | | | 1 | 0 | 0 | 0 | 0 | 0 | 0 | 0 | 0 | 0 | 1 | 0 |
