= Walter Bou =

Argentine footballer

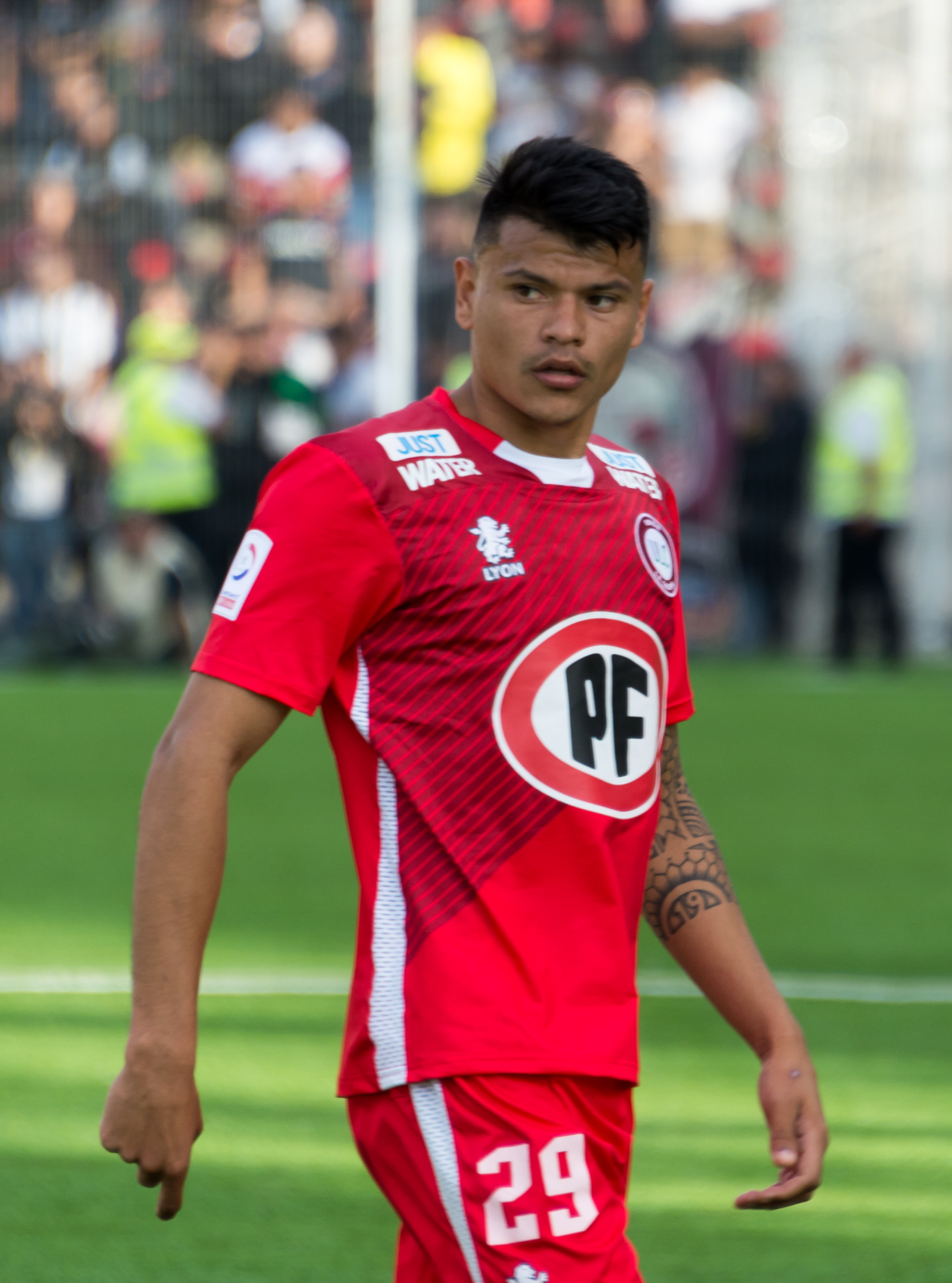
- Bou with Unión La Calera in 2019

Personal information
- Full name: Walter Ariel Bou
- Date of birth: 25 August 1993 (age 33)
- Place of birth: Concordia, Argentina
- Height: 1.74 m (5 ft 9 in)
- Position: Forward

Team information
- Current team: O'Higgins (on loan from Lanús)

Youth career
- –2014: Boca Juniors

Senior career*
Years	Team	Apps	(Gls)
2014–2016	Gimnasia LP	25	(7)
2016–2022	Boca Juniors	41	(9)
2018	→ Vitória (loan)	8	(0)
2019	→ Unión La Calera (loan)	13	(2)
2019–2020	→ Unión Santa Fe (loan)	20	(5)
2020–2021	→ Defensa y Justicia (loan)	36	(15)
2022	Defensa y Justicia	19	(2)
2022–2024	Vélez Sarsfield	41	(8)
2024–	Lanús	71	(21)
2026–	→ O'Higgins (loan)	0	(0)
- * Club domestic league appearances and goals as of 17:12, 6 June 2026 (UTC)

Walter Ariel Bou (born 25 August 1993) is an Argentine professional footballer who plays for Chilean club O'Higgins on loan from Lanús.

== Career ==
=== Gimnasia y Esgrima La Plata ===
Bou started his youth career at Boca Juniors, but was released on a free transfer before debuting with the first team. He was signed by Gimnasia, debuted for them in the Argentine Primera División on 23 August 2014, in a 2–1 defeat against Rosario Central. He scored his first goal on 14 February 2016, in a 3–2 victory against Patronato. On 18 February 2016, he scored his first brace in a 3–1 victory against Sarmiento.

=== Boca Juniors ===
On 3 June 2016, Bou joined Boca Juniors. On 16 October 2016, he scored his first goal against Sarmiento in a 2–0 victory, and his first double on 6 December against Racing, in a 4–2 victory.

==== Vitória ====
On 16 July 2018, Bou joined Brazilian Série A club Vitória, on a one-year loan. After his club got relegated, he rescinded his contract with the club.

==== Unión La Calera ====
On 30 January 2019, Bou joined Chilean Primera División club Unión La Calera, on a one-year loan with option to buy.

==== Unión Santa Fe ====
On 23 July 2019, Bou returned to Argentina, joining Unión de Santa Fe on a one-year loan.

=== Defensa y Justicia ===
On 11 September 2020, Bou extended his contract with Boca until December 2022, before joining Defensa y Justicia on 6 December, on a one-year loan. After a successful loan, he was expected to return to Boca, but on 22 January 2022, he permanently joined Defensa y Justicia, signing a four-year contract.

=== Vélez Sarsfield ===
On 25 June 2022, Bou joined Vélez Sarsfield and signed a contract until December 2025.

=== Lanús ===
On 19 January 2024, Bou joined Lanús and signed a contract until December 2026.

==== O'Higgins (loan) ====
On 13 August 2026, Bou joined Chilean club O'Higgins on a loan until the end of the season.

== Career statistics ==
As of 5 August 2024

Appearances and goals by club, season and competition
Club	Season	League			Cup (Note: Appearances in Copa Argentina and Copa Chile)		Continental (Note: Appearances in Copa Sudamericana and Copa Libertadores)		Other (Note: Appearances in Torneos de Verano and Copa de la Liga)		Total	
Club	Season	Division	Apps	Goals	Apps	Goals	Apps	Goals	Apps	Goals	Apps	Goals
Gimnasia La Plata	2014	Argentine Primera División	8	0	1	0	2	0	—		11	0
Gimnasia La Plata	2015	Argentine Primera División	2	0	0	0	—		—		2	0
Gimnasia La Plata	2016	Argentine Primera División	15	7	1	0	—		0	0	16	7
Gimnasia La Plata	Total		25	7	2	0	2	0	0	0	29	7
Boca Juniors	2016–17	Argentine Primera División	25	6	1	0	1	0	3	2	30	8
Boca Juniors	2017–18	Argentine Primera División	16	3	2	0	6	0	2	1	26	4
Boca Juniors	Total		41	9	3	0	7	0	5	3	56	12
Vitória (loan)	2018	Série A	8	0	0	0	—		—		8	0
Unión La Calera (loan)	2019	Chilean Primera División	13	2	4	3	6	2	—		23	7
Unión de Santa Fe (loan)	2019–20	Argentine Primera División	20	5	1	0	—		1	1	22	6
Defensa y Justicia (loan)	2021	Argentine Primera División	36	15	3	1	13	4	—		52	20
Defensa y Justicia	2022	Argentine Primera División	19	2	1	0	4	1	—		24	3
Defensa y Justicia	Total		55	17	4	1	17	5	—		76	23
Vélez Sarsfield	2022	Argentine Primera División	18	5	1	0	6	0	—		25	5
Vélez Sarsfield	2023	Argentine Primera División	23	3	1	0	—		0	0	24	3
Vélez Sarsfield	Total		41	8	2	0	6	0	0	0	49	8
Lanús	2024	Argentine Primera División	19	10	1	0	5	6	—		25	16
Lanús	2025	Argentine Primera División	0	0	0	0	0	0	—		0	0
Career total			222	58	17	4	43	13	6	4	285	79

== Personal life ==
Walter older brother Gustavo Bou is a former footballer.

== Honours ==
Lanús

- Copa Sudamericana: 2025
- Recopa Sudamericana: 2026
