= Yoshan Valois =

Colombian footballer (born 2004)

Personal information
- Full name: Yoshan Stiven Valois Murillo
- Date of birth: 4 October 2004 (age 22)
- Place of birth: Colombia
- Height: 1.87 m (6 ft 2 in)
- Position: Forward

Team information
- Current team: Lanús
- Number: 19

Youth career
- Inter Palmira

Senior career*
Years	Team	Apps	(Gls)
2024	Inter Palmira	24	(0)
2025–2026	Deportivo Pasto	19	(10)
2025	→ Zamora (loan)	7	(0)
2026–	Lanús	9	(1)
- * Club domestic league appearances and goals as of 17:18, 6 June 2026 (UTC)

Yoshan Stiven Valois Murillo (born 4 October 2004) is a Colombian professional footballer who plays as a forward for Lanús.

== Career ==
As a youth player, Valois joined the youth academy of Colombian side Inter Palmira and was promoted to the club's senior team in 2024, where he made twenty-four league appearances and scored zero goals. Ahead of the 2025 season, he signed for Colombian side Deportivo Pasto, where he made nineteen league appearances and scored ten goals. Colombian news website Futbolred wrote in 2025 that he was "a key player for the club in 2025" while playing for them.

The same year, he was sent on loan to Venezuelan side Zamora, where he made seven league appearances and scored zero goals.

On 25 January 2026, Valois signed for Russian side Akhmat. However, on 18 February 2026, his previous club Deportivo Pasto announced that the transfer is cancelled because of the problems with the transfer of the fee by Akhmat in compliance with the international and Colombian banking regulations. He was nevertheless registered as an Akhmat player by the Russian Premier League. On 25 February 2026, Deportivo Pasto again confirmed that Valois is staying at the club and will officially return to the squad on 1 March.

== Style of play ==
Valois plays as a forward. Right-footed, he is known for his vision, technical ability, and shooting ability.
