= Sasha Marcich =

Argentine footballer

Personal information
- Full name: Sasha Julián Marcich
- Date of birth: 29 May 1998 (age 28)
- Place of birth: Buenos Aires, Argentina
- Height: 1.75 m (5 ft 9 in)
- Position: Left-back

Team information
- Current team: Lanús
- Number: 6

Youth career
- Platense

Senior career*
Years	Team	Apps	(Gls)
2021–2025	Platense	74	(3)
2021	→ Talleres RdE (loan)	20	(0)
2022	→ San Telmo (loan)	17	(0)
2022	→ Estudiantes RC (loan)	19	(0)
2025–	Lanús	49	(2)
- * Club domestic league appearances and goals as of 17:09, 6 June 2026 (UTC)

Sasha Julián Marcich (born 29 May 1998) is an Argentine professional footballer who plays as a left-back for Lanús.

== Career ==
Marcich came through the youth setup at Platense, signing his first professional contract in May 2019. He made his first team debut on 28 February against River Plate in the Copa de la Liga Profesional. For the rest of the season, he went on loan to Primera B Metropolitana side Talleres RdE. During the 2022 season, he was loaned out to San Telmo and Estudiantes RC, both in the Primera Nacional. He returned to Platense in 2023 where he made his breakthrough into the first team, returning to the Primera División against Independiente on 5 February.

On 13 January 2025, he joined Lanús, signing a contract until the end of 2027. He made his debut on 2 February 2025 in a 2–0 win against Sarmiento. He featured throughout their winning Copa Sudamericana campaign, scoring a penalty in the shootout in the 2025 Copa Sudamericana final against Atlético Mineiro. He featured as one of 8 Lanús players in the team of the tournament.

== Career statistics ==
As of 18 January 2026

Appearances and goals by club, season and competition
Club	Season	League			Cup (Note: Includes Copa Argentina)		Continental		Other		Total	
Club	Season	Division	Goals	Apps	Apps	Goals	Apps	Goals	Apps	Goals	Apps	Goals
Platense	2021	AFA Liga Profesional de Fútbol	3	0	—		—		—		3	0
Platense	2023	AFA Liga Profesional de Fútbol	32	2	1	0	—		—		33	2
Platense	2024	AFA Liga Profesional de Fútbol	39	1	2	0	—		—		41	1
Platense	Total		74	3	3	0	0	0	0	0	77	3
Talleres RdE	2021	Primera B Metropolitana	20	0	—		—		—		20	0
San Telmo	2022	Primera Nacional	17	0	—		—		—		17	0
Estudiantes RC	2022	Primera Nacional	19	0	—		—		—		19	0
Lanús	2025	AFA Liga Profesional de Fútbol	33	1	3	1	13 (Note: Appearances in Copa Sudamericana)	0	0	0	49	2
Career total			163	4	6	1	13	0	0	0	182	5

== Honours ==
Lanús

- Copa Sudamericana: 2025
- Recopa Sudamericana: 2026
