= Lucas Besozzi =

Argentine footballer

Personal information
- Full name: Lucas Agustín Besozzi
- Date of birth: 22 January 2003 (age 23)
- Place of birth: Lanús, Argentina
- Height: 1.76 m (5 ft 9 in)
- Position: Left winger

Team information
- Current team: Lanús
- Number: 77

Youth career
- Lanús

Senior career*
Years	Team	Apps	(Gls)
2020–	Lanús	18	(0)
2022–2023	→ Central Córdoba SdE (loan)	40	(3)
2023–2024	→ Grêmio (loan)	18	(1)
2024	→ Newell's Old Boys (loan)	9	(0)
2025	→ Tigre (loan)	5	(1)
2025	→ Central Córdoba SdE (loan)	15	(2)
- * Club domestic league appearances and goals as of 17:24, 6 June 2026 (UTC)

Lucas Agustín Besozzi (born 22 January 2003) is an Argentine professional footballer who plays as a left winger for Argentine club Lanús. (Note: Lucas Besozzi at Soccerway) (Note: Lucas Besozzi at WorldFootball.net)

== Career ==
Besozzi came through the youth ranks at Lanús. He was promoted into the senior set-up at the age of seventeen in 2020, with manager Luis Zubeldía calling him up for pre-season; as he notably featured in a friendly defeat to Vélez Sarsfield in October, having signed a contract two months prior. Besozzi's competitive debut soon arrived on 6 December, with the forward replacing Franco Orozco with twenty-five minutes remaining of a Copa de la Liga Profesional loss away to Newell's Old Boys; he had been an unused substitute four times in the preceding month or so.

On 10 February 2022, Besozzi joined Central Córdoba SdE on a dry loan until the end of 2022.

== Career statistics ==
As of 7 December 2020.

Appearances and goals by club, season and competition
Club	Season	League			Cup		League Cup		Continental		Other		Total	
Club	Season	Division	Apps	Goals	Apps	Goals	Apps	Goals	Apps	Goals	Apps	Goals	Apps	Goals
Lanús	2020–21 (Note: Soccerway counts Copa de la Liga Profesional appearances as league appearances.)	Primera División	1	0	0	0	0	0	0	0	0	0	1	0
Career total			1	0	0	0	0	0	0	0	0	0	1	0

== Honours ==
Grêmio

- Campeonato Gaúcho: 2024

Lanús

- Recopa Sudamericana: 2026
