= Rafael Castillo, Buenos Aires =

City in Buenos Aires Province, Argentina

Rafael Castillo
- City
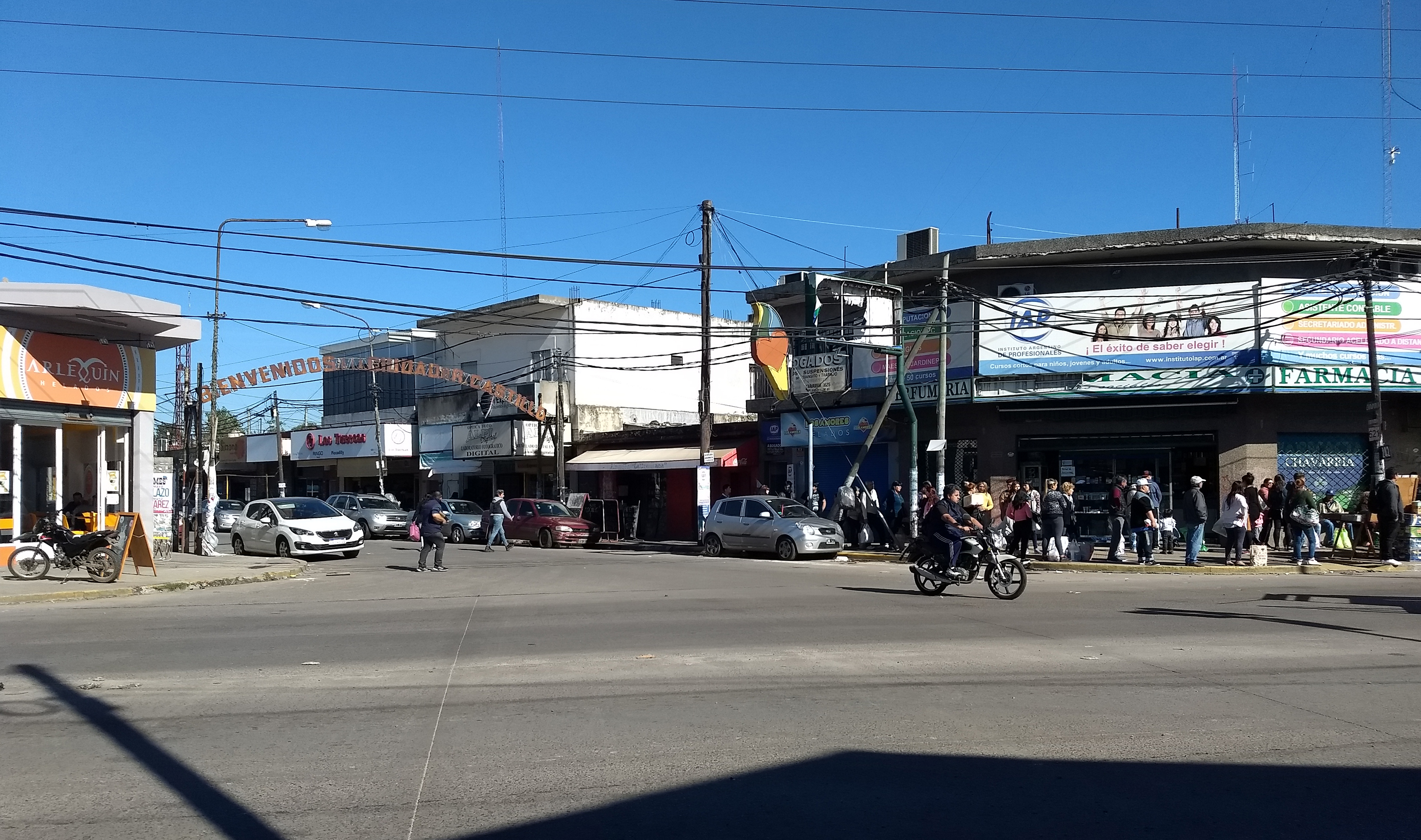
- Retail hub of Rafael Castillo
- Interactive map of Rafael Castillo
- Location in Greater Buenos Aires
- Coordinates: 34°43′S 58°37′W
- Country: Argentina
- Province: Buenos Aires
- Partido: La Matanza
- Declared a city: 1974

Area
  - Total: 14.25 km^{2} (5.50 sq mi)
- Elevation: 23 m (75 ft)

Population (2010 census [INDEC])
  - Total: 147,965
- CPA Base: B 1755
- Area code: +54 11

Rafael Castillo (Spanish: [rafaˈel kasˈtiʝo]) is a western suburb of Buenos Aires, located in La Matanza Partido, Buenos Aires Province, Argentina. It is part of the urban agglomeration of Greater Buenos Aires.

It is named after Rafael Castillo, lawyer and politician who served as the minister of the Interior of Argentina from 1904 to 1906 and owner of the lands where he planned the establishment of the town.

Rafael Castillo was declared a city by the Provincial Legislature on 18 October 1974.

According to the 2010 Census, the city had a total population of 147,965.

== Notable people ==
- Oscar Garré (born 1956), footballer, part of the national squad that won the 1986 FIFA World Cup, was raised in Rafael Castillo.
- Leonardo Pisculichi (born 1984 in Rafael Castillo), footballer.
