= Gonzalo Pérez (footballer) =

Uruguayan footballer (born 2001)

Personal information
- Full name: Gonzalo Germán Pérez Corbalán
- Date of birth: 4 January 2001 (age 25)
- Place of birth: Montevideo, Uruguay
- Height: 1.85 m (6 ft 1 in)
- Position: Defender

Team information
- Current team: Lanús
- Number: 4

Youth career
- Liverpool Montevideo

Senior career*
Years	Team	Apps	(Gls)
2020–2023	Liverpool Montevideo	105	(1)
2023–	Lanús	64	(0)
- * Club domestic league appearances and goals as of 17:05, 6 June 2026 (UTC)

Gonzalo Germán Pérez Corbalán (born 4 January 2001) is a Uruguayan professional footballer who plays as a defender for Lanús.

== Career ==
A youth academy graduate of Liverpool Montevideo, Pérez signed his first professional with the club ahead of 2020 season. He made his professional debut on 8 August 2020 in a 1–1 draw against Rentistas.

== Career statistics ==
As of 12 February 2023

Appearances and goals by club, season and competition
Club	Season	League			Cup		Continental		Other		Total	
Club	Season	Division	Apps	Goals	Apps	Goals	Apps	Goals	Apps	Goals	Apps	Goals
Liverpool Montevideo	2020	Uruguayan Primera División	24	0	—		0	0	0	0	24	0
Liverpool Montevideo	2021	Uruguayan Primera División	25	0	—		2 (Note: Appearances in Copa Libertadores.)	0	—		27	0
Liverpool Montevideo	2022	Uruguayan Primera División	33	1	1	0	0	0	2 (Note: One appearance each in Torneo Intermedio final and championship playoff.)	0	36	1
Liverpool Montevideo	2023	Uruguayan Primera División	2	0	0	0	0	0	1 (Note: Appearance in Supercopa Uruguaya.)	0	3	0
Career total			84	1	1	0	2	0	3	0	90	1

== Honours ==
Liverpool Montevideo

- Uruguayan Primera División: 2023
- Supercopa Uruguaya: 2023

Lanús

- Copa Sudamericana: 2025
- Recopa Sudamericana: 2026
