= Ramiro Carrera =

Argentine footballer

Personal information
- Full name: Ramiro Ángel Carrera
- Date of birth: 24 October 1993 (age 33)
- Place of birth: La Plata, Argentina
- Height: 1.82 m (5 ft 11 1/2 in)
- Position: Midfielder

Team information
- Current team: Lanús (on loan from Cruz Azul)
- Number: 23

Youth career
- Arsenal de Sarandí

Senior career*
Years	Team	Apps	(Gls)
2013–2017	Arsenal de Sarandí	89	(14)
2016–2017	→ Gimnasia La Plata (loan)	16	(0)
2018	Unión Española	22	(2)
2019–2022	Atlético Tucumán	96	(17)
2023	Cruz Azul	10	(0)
2023	→ Atlético Tucumán (loan)	10	(1)
2024–	Lanús	68	(5)
- * Club domestic league appearances and goals as of 17:19, 6 June 2026 (UTC)

Ramiro Ángel Carrera (born 24 October 1993) is an Argentine footballer who plays as a midfielder for Lanús.

== Honours ==
Lanús

- Copa Sudamericana: 2025
- Recopa Sudamericana: 2026
