= Felipe Peña =

Argentine footballer

Personal information
- Full name: Felipe Peña Biafore
- Date of birth: 5 April 2001 (age 25)
- Place of birth: Pehuajó, Argentina
- Height: 1.80 m (5 ft 11 in)
- Position: Midfielder

Team information
- Current team: Lanús
- Number: 5

Youth career
- 2012–2021: River Plate

Senior career*
Years	Team	Apps	(Gls)
2021–2024	River Plate	11	(0)
2023	→ Arsenal Sarandí (loan)	25	(0)
2023–2024	→ Lanús (loan)	30	(2)
2024–	Lanús	38	(1)
- * Club domestic league appearances and goals as of 17:08, 6 June 2026 (UTC)

Felipe Peña Biafore (born 5 April 2001) is an Argentine professional footballer who plays as a midfielder for Lanús.

== Career ==
Peña is a product of River Plate's youth academy, having joined in 2012. On 14 February 2020, he signed his first professional contract with his childhood club. He made his professional debut with River Plate in a 2–1 Copa Libertadores win over Independiente Santa Fe on 19 May 2021; the game was noteworthy as River Plate was hit by a COVID-19 outbreak, resulting in them having no substitute players, and their outfielder Enzo Pérez had to play as goalkeeper.

After a loan spell, Peña joined Lanús permanently in August 2024.

== Honours ==
- Copa Sudamericana: 2025
- Recopa Sudamericana: 2026
