= 2001 FIFA World Youth Championship squads =

FIFA championship roster

Below are the squads for the 2001 FIFA World Youth Championship in Argentina.

Players marked in bold went on to earn full international caps.

== Group A ==
=== Argentina ===
Head coach: (Argentina) José Pékerman

No.	Pos.	Player	Date of birth (age)	Caps	Club
1	GK	**Germán Lux**	7 June 1982 (aged 19)		(Argentina) River Plate
2	DF	**Nicolás Burdisso**	12 April 1981 (aged 20)		(Argentina) Boca Juniors
3	MF	Julio Arca	31 January 1981 (aged 20)		(England) Sunderland
4	DF	Mauro Cetto	14 April 1982 (aged 19)		(Argentina) Rosario Central
5	MF	**Nicolás Medina**	17 February 1982 (aged 19)		(Argentina) Argentinos Juniors
6	DF	**Fabricio Coloccini**	22 January 1982 (aged 19)		(Argentina) San Lorenzo
7	FW	**Javier Saviola**	11 December 1981 (aged 19)		(Argentina) River Plate
8	MF	**Oscar Ahumada**	31 August 1982 (aged 18)		(Argentina) River Plate
9	FW	Esteban Herrera	9 March 1981 (aged 20)		(Argentina) Boca Juniors
10	MF	**Leandro Romagnoli**	17 March 1981 (aged 20)		(Argentina) San Lorenzo
11	MF	**Maxi Rodríguez**	2 January 1981 (aged 20)		(Argentina) Newell's Old Boys
12	DF	Ariel Seltzer	3 January 1981 (aged 20)		(Argentina) Argentinos Juniors
13	DF	Diego Colotto	10 March 1981 (aged 20)		(Argentina) Estudiantes
14	MF	**Leonardo Ponzio**	29 January 1982 (aged 19)		(Argentina) Newell's Old Boys
15	MF	**Andrés D'Alessandro**	15 April 1981 (aged 20)		(Argentina) River Plate
16	FW	**Mauro Rosales**	24 February 1981 (aged 20)		(Argentina) Newell's Old Boys
17	MF	Alejandro Domínguez	10 June 1981 (aged 20)		(Argentina) Quilmes
18	GK	**Willy Caballero**	28 September 1981 (aged 19)		(Argentina) Boca Juniors
19	FW	Sebastián Bueno	24 October 1981 (aged 19)		(Argentina) Sarmiento de Junín

=== Egypt ===
Head coach: (Egypt) Shawky Gharieb

No.	Pos.	Player	Date of birth (age)	Caps	Club
1	GK	**Mohamed Sobhy**	30 August 1981 (aged 19)		(Egypt) Ismaily
2	DF	**Ahmed Samir**	3 October 1981 (aged 19)		(Egypt) Baladeyet El-Mahalla
3	MF	Abou El Magd	1 January 1981 (aged 20)		(Egypt) Al Ahly
4	DF	Hussein Amin	26 April 1981 (aged 20)		(Egypt) Al Ahly
5	DF	Mahmoud Mahmoud	30 June 1981 (aged 19)		(Egypt) Zamalek SC
6	DF	Mohamed El Atrawy	19 August 1981 (aged 19)		(Egypt) Al-Mehalla
7	MF	**Mohamed Shawky**	5 October 1981 (aged 19)		(Egypt) Al-Masry
8	MF	Wael Riad	2 August 1982 (aged 18)		(Egypt) Al Ahly
9	MF	**Reda Shehata**	24 January 1981 (aged 20)		(Egypt) Al Ahly
10	FW	**Mohsen Abo Gresha**	4 August 1981 (aged 19)		(Egypt) Ismaily
11	FW	**Mohamed El Yamani**	1 January 1982 (aged 19)		(Belgium) Standard Liège
12	MF	**Mohamed Abdel Wahed**	19 January 1981 (aged 20)		(Egypt) Al-Tersana
13	DF	**Amir Azmy**	14 February 1983 (aged 18)		(Egypt) Zamalek SC
14	MF	**Hossam Ghaly**	15 December 1981 (aged 19)		(Egypt) Al Ahly
15	DF	**Ahmed Abou Moslem**	25 July 1981 (aged 19)		(Egypt) Al Ahly
16	FW	**Gamal Hamza**	5 December 1981 (aged 19)		(Egypt) Zamalek SC
17	MF	Gamal Hawash	14 May 1981 (aged 20)		(Egypt) Dina Farms
18	GK	Wael Zenga	25 November 1981 (aged 19)		(Egypt) Zamalek SC
19	GK	**Sherif Ekramy**	1 July 1983 (aged 17)		(Egypt) Al Ahly

=== Finland ===
Head coach: (Finland) Kari Ukkonen

No.	Pos.	Player	Date of birth (age)	Caps	Club
1	GK	**Otto Fredrikson**	30 November 1981 (aged 19)		(Finland) Tervarit
2	DF	Harri Haapaniemi	1 April 1981 (aged 20)		(Finland) Atlantis
3	DF	Ossi Martikainen	25 November 1982 (aged 18)		(Finland) HJK Helsinki
4	DF	Tuomas Aho	27 May 1981 (aged 20)		(Finland) MyPa
5	DF	Marco Parnela	5 January 1981 (aged 20)		(Switzerland) Thun
6	MF	Mika Niskala	28 March 1981 (aged 20)		(Sweden) Norrköping
7	MF	**Hannu Haarala**	15 August 1981 (aged 19)		(Finland) HJK Helsinki
8	MF	**Antti Okkonen**	6 June 1982 (aged 19)		(Finland) MyPa
9	MF	**Mika Väyrynen**	28 December 1981 (aged 19)		(Finland) FC Jokerit
10	FW	**Mikael Forssell**	15 March 1981 (aged 20)		(England) Chelsea
11	FW	**Daniel Sjölund**	22 April 1983 (aged 18)		(England) Liverpool
12	MF	Jussi Peteri	4 April 1982 (aged 19)		(Finland) HJK Helsinki
13	DF	Juha Luoma	10 January 1981 (aged 20)		(Finland) Jazz
14	DF	**Jukka Sauso**	20 June 1982 (aged 18)		(Finland) Vaasan Palloseura
15	MF	Teemu Lampinen	23 January 1981 (aged 20)		(Finland) Lahti
16	MF	Kristian Kunnas	11 January 1981 (aged 20)		(Finland) HJK Helsinki
17	FW	Matti Santahuhta	13 August 1981 (aged 19)		(Finland) Jazz
18	GK	Tatu Niskanen	16 January 1981 (aged 20)		(Finland) KuPS

=== Jamaica ===
Head coach: (Jamaica) Wendell Downswell

No.	Pos.	Player	Date of birth (age)	Caps	Club
1	GK	Allien Whittaker	19 June 1983 (aged 17)		(Jamaica) Hazard
2	DF	Sheldon Battiste	27 July 1983 (aged 17)		(Jamaica) Hazard
3	DF	**Shavar Thomas**	29 January 1981 (aged 20)		(Jamaica) Hazard
4	MF	Fabian Blake	16 January 1982 (aged 19)		(Jamaica) Reno
5	DF	Shane Stevens	10 March 1982 (aged 19)		(Jamaica) Arnett Gardens
6	DF	Alex Thomas	12 January 1983 (aged 18)		(United States) Loomis Chaffee
7	MF	**Sean Fraser**	15 February 1983 (aged 18)		(Jamaica) Harbour View
8	MF	**Keith Kelly**	5 March 1983 (aged 18)		(France) Paris Saint-Germain
9	MF	**Omar Daley**	25 April 1981 (aged 20)		(Jamaica) Hazard
10	MF	**Fabian Dawkins**	7 February 1981 (aged 20)		(Jamaica) Village United
11	FW	Christopher Nicholas	16 January 1981 (aged 20)		(Jamaica) Tivoli Gardens
12	FW	Craig Gordon	12 February 1983 (aged 18)		(Jamaica) Reno
13	FW	Adam Wallace	22 September 1981 (aged 19)		free agent
14	DF	**Kevon Harris**	1 June 1981 (aged 20)		(Jamaica) Santos
15	DF	**Wolry Wolfe**	12 August 1981 (aged 19)		(Jamaica) Hazard
16	MF	**Khari Stephenson**	18 January 1981 (aged 20)		(United States) Williams College
17	MF	**Damion Williams**	23 April 1981 (aged 20)		(Jamaica) Waterhouse
18	GK	Allan Reid	22 January 1981 (aged 20)		(Jamaica) Boys Town

== Group B ==
=== Brazil ===
Head coach: (Brazil) Carlos César

No.	Pos.	Player	Date of birth (age)	Caps	Club
1	GK	Rubinho	4 August 1982 (aged 18)		(Brazil) Corinthians
2	DF	**Maicon**	26 July 1981 (aged 19)		(Brazil) Cruzeiro
3	DF	**Edu Dracena**	18 May 1981 (aged 20)		(Brazil) Guarani
4	DF	Marquinhos	21 October 1982 (aged 18)		(Brazil) Corinthians
5	MF	**Eduardo Costa**	23 September 1982 (aged 18)		(Brazil) Grêmio
6	DF	Anderson	10 January 1983 (aged 18)		(Brazil) Flamengo
7	FW	Pinga	27 April 1981 (aged 20)		(Italy) Torino
8	MF	**Fernando**	3 May 1981 (aged 20)		(Brazil) Juventude
9	FW	**Adriano**	17 February 1982 (aged 19)		(Brazil) Flamengo
10	MF	**Júlio Baptista**	1 October 1981 (aged 19)		(Brazil) São Paulo
11	FW	**Robert**	7 February 1981 (aged 20)		(Brazil) Botafogo
12	MF	**Léo Lima**	14 January 1982 (aged 19)		(Brazil) Vasco da Gama
13	DF	Ângelo	12 June 1981 (aged 20)		(Brazil) Corinthians
14	DF	**Luisão**	13 February 1981 (aged 20)		(Brazil) Cruzeiro
15	DF	Júlio Santos	12 December 1981 (aged 19)		(Brazil) São Paulo
16	FW	Thiago Oliveira	26 May 1981 (aged 20)		(Brazil) São Paulo
17	MF	**Kaká**	22 April 1982 (aged 19)		(Brazil) São Paulo
18	GK	Márcio	20 December 1981 (aged 19)		(Brazil) São Paulo

=== Canada ===
Head coach: (Canada) Paul James

No.	Pos.	Player	Date of birth (age)	Caps	Goals	Club
1	GK	Pieter Meuleman	4 February 1981 (aged 20)	5	0	(Canadian Soccer Association) Wilfrid Laurier University
2	DF	Bernard Ouassa	6 April 1982 (aged 19)	4	0	(United States Soccer Federation) St. John's University
3	MF	**Terry Dunfield**	20 February 1982 (aged 19)	2	0	(The Football Association) Manchester City
4	DF	Victor Oppong	9 April 1981 (aged 20)	13	0	(United States Soccer Federation) University of Mobile
5	MF	Miles O'Connor	20 April 1982 (aged 19)	9	0	(Canadian Soccer Association) Canada Soccer
6	DF	**Michael Klukowski**	27 May 1981 (aged 20)	5	0	(French Football Federation) Lille
7	MF	**Tam Nsaliwa**	28 January 1982 (aged 19)	7	0	(German Football Association) 1. FC Nürnberg
8	MF	**Maycoll Cañizalez**	28 December 1982 (aged 18)	13	0	(German Football Association) Werder Bremen
9	FW	Wyn Belotte	6 May 1984 (aged 17)	0	0	(French Football Federation) Nantes
10	MF	**Julian de Guzman**	25 March 1981 (aged 20)	7	5	(German Football Association) 1. FC Saarbrücken
11	FW	Gaspare Borsellino	5 June 1981 (aged 20)	9	1	(United States Soccer Federation) University of Mobile
12	FW	Justin Thompson	9 January 1981 (aged 20)	9	0	(United States Soccer Federation) Fairfield University
13	DF	**Chris Pozniak**	10 January 1981 (aged 20)	13	0	(Canadian Soccer Association) Toronto Lynx
14	MF	**Chris Williams**	1 June 1981 (aged 20)	10	0	(United States Soccer Federation) University of Mobile
15	MF	**Atiba Hutchinson**	8 February 1983 (aged 18)	5	0	(Canadian Soccer Association) Woodbridge College
16	FW	**Rob Friend**	23 January 1981 (aged 20)	6	0	(United States Soccer Federation) Western Michigan University
17	FW	**Iain Hume**	30 October 1983 (aged 17)	10	3	(The Football Association) Tranmere Rovers
18	GK	Wojtek Zarzycki	21 June 1982 (aged 18)	4	0	(United States Soccer Federation) Dartmouth College
19	FW	**Josh Simpson**	15 May 1983 (aged 18)	0	0	(United States Soccer Federation) Portland Pilots

=== Germany ===
Head coach: (Germany) Uli Stielike

No.	Pos.	Player	Date of birth (age)	Caps	Club
1	GK	Tom Starke	18 March 1981 (aged 20)		(Germany) Bayer Leverkusen
2	DF	Christoph Preuß	4 July 1981 (aged 19)		(Germany) Eintracht Frankfurt
3	DF	Christian Fickert	10 February 1981 (aged 20)		(Germany) Waldhof Mannheim
4	DF	Denis Lapaczinski	26 September 1981 (aged 19)		(Germany) Hertha BSC
5	DF	Michael Zepek	19 January 1981 (aged 20)		(Germany) Bayer Leverkusen
6	MF	Giuseppe Gemiti	3 May 1981 (aged 20)		(Germany) Eintracht Frankfurt
7	FW	Hüzeyfe Doğan	1 January 1981 (aged 20)		(Germany) Bayer Leverkusen
8	MF	**Hanno Balitsch**	2 January 1981 (aged 20)		(Germany) 1. FC Köln
9	FW	Benjamin Auer	11 January 1981 (aged 20)		(Germany) Borussia Mönchengladbach
10	MF	Selim Teber	7 March 1981 (aged 20)		(Germany) Waldhof Mannheim
11	FW	Thorsten Burkhardt	21 May 1981 (aged 20)		(Germany) Bayer Leverkusen
12	MF	Christian Mikolajczak	15 May 1981 (aged 20)		(Germany) Schalke 04
13	FW	**Jermaine Jones**	3 November 1981 (aged 19)		(Germany) Eintracht Frankfurt
14	FW	Christian Tiffert	18 February 1982 (aged 19)		(Germany) VfB Stuttgart
15	DF	Stephan Kling	22 March 1981 (aged 20)		(Germany) Bayern Munich
16	DF	**Andreas Hinkel**	26 March 1982 (aged 19)		(Germany) VfB Stuttgart
17	FW	Lars Jungnickel	31 August 1981 (aged 19)		(Germany) Energie Cottbus
18	GK	Jan Schlösser	27 September 1982 (aged 18)		(Germany) Bayern Munich

=== Iraq ===
Head coach: (Iraq) Adnan Hamad

No.	Pos.	Player	Date of birth (age)	Caps	Club
1	GK	**Ahmad Ali Jaber**	2 August 1982 (aged 18)		(Iraq) Al Zawraa
2	DF	**Jassim Ghulam**	11 March 1981 (aged 20)		(Iraq) Al-Jaish
3	DF	**Bassim Abbas**	1 July 1982 (aged 18)		(Iraq) Al-Talaba
4	DF	**Haidar Abdul-Amir**	2 November 1982 (aged 18)		(Iraq) Al Zawraa
5	DF	**Munaim Yousif**	2 October 1981 (aged 19)		(Iraq) Al-Shorta
6	MF	Sameeh Sabeeh Amir	20 July 1981 (aged 19)		(Iraq) Al-Quwa Al-Jawiya
7	FW	**Emad Mohammed**	24 July 1982 (aged 18)		(Iraq) Al Zawraa
8	MF	**Nashat Akram**	12 September 1984 (aged 16)		(Iraq) Al-Shorta
9	FW	**Ahmed Mnajed**	13 December 1981 (aged 19)		(Iraq) Al-Shorta
10	FW	**Ammar Ahmad**	2 July 1981 (aged 19)		(Iraq) Al Zawraa
11	MF	**Hawar Mulla Mohammed**	1 June 1981 (aged 20)		(Iraq) Al-Quwa Al-Jawiya
12	DF	**Haidar Abdul-Razzaq**	23 October 1982 (aged 18)		(Iraq) Al Zawraa
13	MF	**Bassim Abdul-Hassan**	1 July 1981 (aged 19)		(Iraq) Al-Talaba
14	DF	**Emad Aoda**	15 November 1981 (aged 19)		(Iraq) Al Minaa
15	MF	**Hassan Turki**	1 July 1981 (aged 19)		(Iraq) Al Zawraa
16	MF	**Mohannad Nassir**	4 April 1983 (aged 18)		(Iraq) Al Zawraa
17	DF	**Salah Al-Deen Siamand**	13 July 1981 (aged 19)		(Iraq) Arbil
18	GK	**Noor Sabri**	18 June 1984 (aged 16)		(Iraq) Al Zawraa
19	FW	**Arkan Najeeb**	2 July 1982 (aged 18)		(Iraq) Al Zawraa

== Group C ==
=== Chile ===
Head coach: (Chile) Héctor Pinto

No.	Pos.	Player	Date of birth (age)	Caps	Club
1	GK	**Johnny Herrera**	9 May 1981 (aged 20)		Universidad de Chile
2	DF	Sergio Fernández	14 June 1981 (aged 20)		(Chile) Colo-Colo
3	DF	Daniel Campos	17 July 1981 (aged 19)		(Chile) Universidad de Concepción
4	DF	**Hugo Droguett**	2 September 1982 (aged 18)		(Chile) Universidad Católica
5	DF	Luis Oyarzún	24 April 1982 (aged 19)		(Chile) Palestino
6	DF	Nelson Pinto	1 February 1981 (aged 20)		Universidad de Chile
7	MF	Gonzalo Villagra	17 September 1981 (aged 19)		(Chile) Universidad Católica
8	MF	**Sebastián Pardo**	1 January 1982 (aged 19)		Universidad de Chile
9	FW	Mario Cáceres	17 March 1981 (aged 20)		(Portugal) Sporting CP
10	MF	**Jaime Valdés**	11 January 1981 (aged 20)		(Italy) Bari
11	FW	Mario Salgado	3 June 1981 (aged 20)		(Chile) Huachipato
12	DF	Gino Reyes	23 February 1981 (aged 20)		(Chile) Colo-Colo
13	FW	**Joel Soto**	9 April 1982 (aged 19)		(Chile) Santiago Wanderers
14	DF	Adán Vergara	9 May 1981 (aged 20)		(Chile) Cobreloa
15	DF	Mario Berríos	20 August 1981 (aged 19)		(Chile) Palestino
16	MF	Roberto Ordenes	5 January 1981 (aged 20)		(Chile) Unión Española
17	MF	**Rodrigo Millar**	3 November 1981 (aged 19)		(Chile) Huachipato
18	GK	**Eduardo Lobos**	30 July 1981 (aged 19)		(Chile) Colo-Colo

=== China ===
Head coach: (China) Shen Xiangfu (沈祥福)

No.	Pos.	Player	Date of birth (age)	Caps	Club
1	GK	**An Qi** 安琦	21 June 1981 (aged 19)		(China) Dalian Shide
2	MF	Ma Yi	27 February 1982 (aged 19)		(China) Shenyang Sealion
3	DF	**Du Wei** 杜威	9 February 1982 (aged 19)		(China) Shanghai 02
4	MF	Zhou Lin	4 February 1981 (aged 20)		(China) Chongqing Lifan
5	DF	**Wang Sheng**	1 May 1981 (aged 20)		(China) Dalian Shide
6	MF	**Hu Zhaojun**	1 March 1981 (aged 20)		(China) Dalian Shide
7	DF	**Sun Ji** 孫吉	15 January 1982 (aged 19)		(China) Shanghai 02
8	FW	Gao Ming	19 February 1982 (aged 19)		(China) Qingdao Etsong Hainiu
9	FW	Sui Yong	27 January 1981 (aged 20)		(China) Qingdao Etsong Hainiu
10	MF	**Yan Song**	20 March 1981 (aged 20)		(China) Dalian Shide
11	DF	**Sun Xiang** 孫祥	15 January 1982 (aged 19)		(China) Shanghai 02
12	MF	**Lu Feng**	12 November 1981 (aged 19)		(China) Henan Jianye
13	MF	**Wang Xinxin**	27 April 1981 (aged 20)		(China) Liaoning F.C.
14	DF	**Xu Liang**	12 August 1981 (aged 19)		(China) Liaoning F.C.
15	DF	**Zhang Yaokun**	7 April 1981 (aged 20)		(China) Dalian Shide
16	FW	**Qu Bo** 曲波	15 July 1981 (aged 19)		(China) Qingdao Etsong Hainiu
17	FW	**Yu Tao**	15 October 1981 (aged 19)		(China) Shanghai 02
18	GK	**Yang Jun**	10 June 1981 (aged 20)		(China) Qingdao Etsong Hainiu

=== United States ===
Head coach: (United States) Wolfgang Suhnholz

No.	Pos.	Player	Date of birth (age)	Caps	Club
1	GK	D.J. Countess	9 January 1982 (aged 19)		(United States) UCLA
2	DF	Philip Salyer	30 October 1981 (aged 19)		(United States) University of Maryland
3	DF	**Oguchi Onyewu**	13 May 1982 (aged 19)		(United States) Clemson University
4	DF	Nelson Akwari	4 February 1982 (aged 19)		(United States) UCLA
5	DF	Alex Yi	27 February 1982 (aged 19)		(United States) UCLA
6	DF	Kelly Gray	7 April 1981 (aged 20)		(United States) University of Portland
7	MF	**DaMarcus Beasley**	24 May 1982 (aged 19)		(United States) Chicago Fire
8	FW	**Alecko Eskandarian**	9 July 1982 (aged 18)		(United States) University of Virginia
9	FW	**Brad Davis**	8 November 1981 (aged 19)		(United States) St. Louis University
10	FW	**Landon Donovan**	4 March 1982 (aged 19)		(United States) San Jose Earthquakes
11	MF	**Bobby Convey**	27 May 1983 (aged 18)		(United States) D.C. United
12	DF	Ricky Lewis	29 May 1982 (aged 19)		(United States) Clemson University
13	MF	**Kyle Martino**	19 February 1981 (aged 20)		(United States) University of Virginia
14	DF	Kenny Arena	6 February 1981 (aged 20)		(United States) University of Virginia
15	MF	**Brian Carroll**	20 July 1981 (aged 19)		(United States) Wake Forest University
16	FW	**Conor Casey**	25 July 1981 (aged 19)		(Germany) Borussia Dortmund
17	FW	**Edson Buddle**	21 May 1981 (aged 20)		(United States) Columbus Crew
18	GK	Doug Warren	18 March 1981 (aged 20)		(United States) Clemson University

=== Ukraine ===
Head coach: (Ukraine) Anatoliy Kroshchenko

No.	Pos.	Player	Date of birth (age)	Caps	Club
1	GK	Artem Kusliy	7 July 1981 (aged 19)		(Ukraine) Dnipro Dnipropetrovsk
2	DF	Roman Pasichnychenko	17 June 1981 (aged 20)		(Ukraine) Dnipro Dnipropetrovsk
3	DF	**Bohdan Shershun**	14 May 1981 (aged 20)		(Ukraine) Dnipro Dnipropetrovsk
4	DF	**Serhiy Symonenko**	12 June 1981 (aged 20)		(Russia) Torpedo Moscow
5	DF	Vitaliy Komarnytskyi	2 August 1981 (aged 19)		(Israel) Ironi Rishon leZion
6	MF	Denys Stoyan	24 August 1981 (aged 19)		(Ukraine) Borysfen Boryspil
7	MF	Volodymyr Bondarenko	6 July 1981 (aged 19)		(Ukraine) CSCA Kyiv
8	MF	Andriy Smalko	22 January 1981 (aged 20)		(Ukraine) Borysfen Boryspil
9	FW	**Oleksiy Byelik**	13 February 1981 (aged 20)		(Ukraine) Shakhtar Donetsk
10	FW	Ruslan Valeyev	31 October 1981 (aged 19)		(Netherlands) De Graafschap
11	FW	Andriy Herasymenko	8 January 1981 (aged 20)		(Ukraine) Dynamo Kyiv
12	FW	Taras Kabanov	23 January 1981 (aged 20)		(Ukraine) Karpaty Lviv
13	DF	Fedir Prokhorov	24 April 1981 (aged 20)		(Ukraine) Dnipro Dnipropetrovsk
14	DF	Serhiy Khistyev	30 June 1981 (aged 19)		(Ukraine) Stal Alchevsk
15	MF	**Serhiy Danylovskyi**	20 August 1981 (aged 19)		(Ukraine) Karpaty Lviv
16	MF	Mykola Nakonechnyi	10 September 1981 (aged 19)		(Ukraine) Borysfen Boryspil
17	MF	**Oleksiy Gai**	6 November 1982 (aged 18)		(Ukraine) Shakhtar Donetsk
18	GK	Vitaliy Rudenko	26 October 1981 (aged 19)		(Ukraine) Chornomorets Odesa

== Group D ==
=== Angola ===
Head coach: (Angola) Oliveira Gonçalves

No.	Pos.	Player	Date of birth (age)	Caps	Club
1	GK	**Lamá**	1 February 1981 (aged 20)		(Angola) Petro de Luanda
2	DF	Manuel	16 December 1982 (aged 18)		(Angola) Cabinda
3	MF	Nelsinho	10 December 1981 (aged 19)		(Angola) Interclube
4	DF	**Kikas**	14 March 1981 (aged 20)		(Angola) Interclube
5	DF	Lutucuta	17 May 1982 (aged 19)		(Angola) Bravos do Maquis
6	DF	Dedas	13 February 1982 (aged 19)		(Angola) Primeiro de Agosto
7	MF	**Chinho**	4 February 1982 (aged 19)		(Angola) Petro de Luanda
8	FW	Riquinho	10 August 1981 (aged 19)		(Angola) Petro de Luanda
9	FW	**Rasca**	10 July 1982 (aged 18)		(Portugal) Académica de Coimbra
10	FW	**Mantorras**	18 March 1982 (aged 19)		(Portugal) Alverca
11	FW	**Gilberto**	21 September 1982 (aged 18)		(Angola) Petro de Luanda
12	MF	Castigo	24 February 1983 (aged 18)		(Portugal) Boavista
13	DF	Vemba	6 December 1982 (aged 18)		(Angola) Primeiro de Agosto
14	FW	**António Mendonça**	9 October 1982 (aged 18)		(Portugal) Varzim
15	FW	**Loló**	13 December 1981 (aged 19)		(Angola) Primeiro de Agosto
16	MF	Mateus	10 March 1981 (aged 20)		(Portugal) Sporting CP
17	FW	**Fofaná**	5 May 1982 (aged 19)		(Angola) Benfica de Luanda
18	GK	Capoco	3 April 1982 (aged 19)		(Angola) Petro do Huambo

=== Australia ===
Head coach: (Australia) Ange Postecoglou

No.	Pos.	Player	Date of birth (age)	Caps	Club
1	GK	Michael Turnbull	24 March 1981 (aged 20)		(Australia) Marconi Stallions
2	DF	Mark Byrnes	8 February 1982 (aged 19)		(Australia) Parramatta Power
3	DF	**Adrian Madaschi**	11 July 1982 (aged 18)		(Italy) Atalanta
4	DF	**Ljubo Milicevic**	13 February 1981 (aged 20)		(Australia) Perth Glory
5	DF	**Patrick Kisnorbo**	24 March 1981 (aged 20)		(Australia) South Melbourne
6	MF	Wayne Srhoj	23 March 1982 (aged 19)		(Australia) Brisbane Strikers
7	MF	**Ahmad Elrich**	30 May 1981 (aged 20)		(Australia) Parramatta Power
8	FW	Greg Owens	27 January 1981 (aged 20)		(Australia) Sydney Olympic
9	FW	**Joshua Kennedy**	20 August 1982 (aged 18)		(Germany) VfL Wolfsburg
10	FW	**Nick Carle**	23 November 1981 (aged 19)		(Australia) Sydney Olympic
11	FW	**Scott McDonald**	21 August 1983 (aged 17)		(England) Southampton
12	MF	Lucas Pantelis	12 March 1982 (aged 19)		(Australia) Adelaide City Force
13	DF	Gareth Edds	3 February 1981 (aged 20)		(England) Nottingham Forest
14	MF	Louis Brain	9 May 1982 (aged 19)		(Australia) Adelaide City Force
15	MF	**Luke Wilkshire**	2 October 1981 (aged 19)		(England) Middlesbrough
16	MF	Daniel Vasilevski	4 September 1981 (aged 19)		(Australia) Melbourne Knights
17	FW	Kevork Gulesserian	21 September 1981 (aged 19)		(Australia) Marconi Stallions
18	GK	Jess Vanstrattan	19 July 1982 (aged 18)		(Italy) Hellas Verona
20	DF	**Jonathan McKain**	21 September 1982 (aged 18)		(Australia) Brisbane Strikers

=== Czech Republic ===
Head coach: (Czech Republic) Dušan Fitzel

No.	Pos.	Player	Date of birth (age)	Caps	Club
1	GK	Patrik Kolář	30 October 1981 (aged 19)		(Czech Republic) Sparta Prague
2	DF	**Tomáš Hübschman**	4 September 1981 (aged 19)		(Czech Republic) Sparta Prague
3	DF	Patrik Křap	13 March 1981 (aged 20)		(Czech Republic) Brno
4	FW	Tomáš Pešír	30 May 1981 (aged 20)		(Czech Republic) Slavia Prague
5	MF	Petr Silný	7 April 1981 (aged 20)		(Czech Republic) Slovan Liberec
6	DF	Martin Leština	25 April 1981 (aged 20)		(Czech Republic) Dynamo Budějovice
7	DF	Vlastimil Vidlička	2 July 1981 (aged 19)		(Czech Republic) Slovan Liberec
8	MF	**Radek Šírl**	20 March 1981 (aged 20)		(Czech Republic) Bohemians Prague
9	MF	Michal Macek	19 January 1981 (aged 20)		(Czech Republic) Marila Příbram
10	FW	Jaroslav Šedivec	16 February 1981 (aged 20)		(Czech Republic) Viktoria Plzeň
11	DF	Tomáš Glos	19 June 1981 (aged 19)		(Czech Republic) Sigma Olomouc
12	MF	**David Lafata**	18 September 1981 (aged 19)		(Czech Republic) Dynamo Budějovice
13	MF	Martin Živný	20 March 1981 (aged 20)		(Czech Republic) Brno
14	MF	**Jan Polák**	14 March 1981 (aged 20)		(Czech Republic) Brno
15	FW	Petr Musil	23 September 1981 (aged 19)		(Czech Republic) Brno
16	FW	**Tomáš Jun**	17 January 1983 (aged 18)		(Czech Republic) Sparta Prague
17	DF	Pavel Besta	2 September 1982 (aged 18)		(Czech Republic) Baník Ostrava
18	GK	**Petr Čech**	20 May 1982 (aged 19)		(Czech Republic) Sparta Prague

=== Japan ===
Head coach: (Japan) Akihiro Nishimura

No.	Pos.	Player	Date of birth (age)	Caps	Club
1	GK	Yōsuke Fujigaya	13 February 1981 (aged 20)		(Japan) Consadole Sapporo
2	DF	Shohei Ikeda	27 April 1981 (aged 20)		(Japan) Shimizu S-Pulse
3	DF	Sota Nakazawa	26 October 1982 (aged 18)		(Japan) Kashiwa Reysol
4	DF	~~**Teruyuki Moniwa**~~	8 September 1981 (aged 19)		(Japan) Shonan Bellmare
5	DF	Kenji Haneda	1 December 1981 (aged 19)		(Japan) Kashima Antlers
6	DF	**Yūichi Komano**	25 July 1981 (aged 19)		(Japan) Sanfrecce Hiroshima
7	MF	**Takeshi Aoki**	28 September 1982 (aged 18)		(Japan) Kashima Antlers
8	MF	Kazuyuki Morisaki	9 May 1981 (aged 20)		(Japan) Sanfrecce Hiroshima
9	FW	Yutaka Tahara	27 April 1982 (aged 19)		(Japan) Yokohama F. Marinos
10	MF	**Naohiro Ishikawa**	12 May 1981 (aged 20)		(Japan) Yokohama F. Marinos
11	FW	**Hisato Satō**	12 March 1982 (aged 19)		(Japan) JEF United Ichihara
12	MF	Shunta Nagai	12 July 1982 (aged 18)		(Japan) Kashiwa Reysol
13	MF	**Koji Yamase**	22 September 1981 (aged 19)		(Japan) Consadole Sapporo
14	FW	**Ryoichi Maeda**	9 October 1981 (aged 19)		(Japan) Júbilo Iwata
15	FW	Kazuki Hiramoto	18 August 1981 (aged 19)		(Japan) Tokyo Verdy 1969
16	MF	Kōji Morisaki	9 May 1981 (aged 20)		(Japan) Sanfrecce Hiroshima
17	FW	Kazunori Iio	23 February 1982 (aged 19)		(Japan) Tokyo Verdy 1969
18	GK	Takaya Kurokawa	7 April 1981 (aged 20)		(Japan) Shimizu S-Pulse
19	DF	Daisuke Nasu	10 October 1981 (aged 19)		(Japan) Yokohama F. Marinos

== Group E ==
=== Costa Rica ===
Head coach: (Costa Rica) Carlos Watson

No.	Pos.	Player	Date of birth (age)	Caps	Club
1	GK	Neighel Drummond	2 February 1982 (aged 19)		(Costa Rica) Alajuelense
2	DF	**Michael Rodríguez**	30 December 1981 (aged 19)		(Costa Rica) Alajuelense
3	DF	Pablo Salazar	21 November 1982 (aged 18)		(Costa Rica) Alajuelense
4	MF	**Cristian Montero**	24 June 1982 (aged 18)		(Costa Rica) Alajuelense
5	DF	**Roy Myrie**	21 August 1982 (aged 18)		(Costa Rica) Alajuelense
6	DF	Johel Fajardo	25 January 1981 (aged 20)		(Costa Rica) Guanacaste
7	FW	**Erick Scott**	29 May 1981 (aged 20)		(Costa Rica) Alajuelense
8	MF	**José Luis López**	31 March 1981 (aged 20)		(Costa Rica) Heredia
9	FW	Derman Moss	9 April 1983 (aged 18)		(Costa Rica) Limonense
10	FW	**Warren Granados**	6 December 1981 (aged 19)		(Costa Rica) Ramonense
11	FW	**Winston Parks**	12 October 1981 (aged 19)		(Costa Rica) Limonense
12	DF	Harold Apu	30 January 1981 (aged 20)		(Costa Rica) Liberia
13	MF	Jonathan Orozco	12 March 1981 (aged 20)		(Costa Rica) Saprissa
14	MF	**Daniel Vallejos**	27 May 1981 (aged 20)		(Costa Rica) Heredia
15	DF	Alonso Alfaro	16 March 1981 (aged 20)		(Costa Rica) Heredia
16	MF	**Carlos Hernández**	9 April 1982 (aged 19)		(Costa Rica) Alajuelense
17	DF	Michael Robinson	31 July 1981 (aged 19)		(Costa Rica) Alajuelense
18	GK	Daniel Rodríguez	3 April 1982 (aged 19)		(Costa Rica) Heredia
20	MF	Randy Araya	4 May 1981 (aged 20)		(Costa Rica) Cartagines

=== Ecuador ===
Head coach: (Ecuador) Fabián Burbano

No.	Pos.	Player	Date of birth (age)	Caps	Club
1	GK	Omar Estrada	29 March 1982 (aged 19)		(Ecuador) LDU Quito
2	DF	William Cuero	1 June 1981 (aged 20)		(Ecuador) Barcelona
3	DF	**Jorge Guagua**	28 September 1981 (aged 19)		(Ecuador) El Nacional
4	DF	Pool Gavilánez	3 August 1981 (aged 19)		(Ecuador) Santa Rita
5	MF	Cristhian Quiñónez	12 September 1981 (aged 19)		(Ecuador) Barcelona
6	DF	Jorge Vargas	30 January 1981 (aged 20)		(Ecuador) LDU Quito
7	MF	Pedro Esterilla	28 October 1984 (aged 16)		(Ecuador) ESPOLI
8	MF	Líder Mejía	26 January 1981 (aged 20)		(Ecuador) LDU Quito
9	FW	Estuardo Quiñónez	14 April 1981 (aged 20)		(Ecuador) Universidad Católica
10	MF	Javier Intriago	9 January 1981 (aged 20)		(Ecuador) Santa Rita
11	FW	**Franklin Salas**	30 August 1981 (aged 19)		(Ecuador) LDU Quito
12	FW	Walter Iza	2 August 1981 (aged 19)		(Ecuador) Aucas
13	DF	Edwin Pineda	28 August 1982 (aged 18)		(Ecuador) LDU Quito
14	MF	**Segundo Castillo**	15 May 1982 (aged 19)		(Ecuador) ESPOLI
15	FW	**Roberto Miña**	7 November 1984 (aged 16)		(Ecuador) Salesiano
16	DF	**Franklin Corozo**	15 February 1981 (aged 20)		(Ecuador) Emelec
17	FW	**Félix Borja**	2 April 1983 (aged 18)		(Ecuador) El Nacional
18	GK	**Daniel Viteri**	12 December 1981 (aged 19)		(Ecuador) Emelec

=== Ethiopia ===
Head coach: (France) Diego Garzitto

No.	Pos.	Player	Date of birth (age)	Caps	Club
1	GK	Adugna Deyes	13 July 1983 (aged 17)		(Ethiopia) EEPCO
2	MF	Belay Fekadu	10 September 1983 (aged 17)		(Ethiopia) Saint-George SA
3	DF	Molla Ermias	30 May 1983 (aged 18)		(Ethiopia) BSPP
4	DF	Bekele Zewdu	27 May 1982 (aged 19)		(Ethiopia) Awassa City
5	DF	Gebremichael Yonas	7 August 1982 (aged 18)		(Ethiopia) EEPCO
6	DF	Tesfaye Kefyalew	7 August 1983 (aged 17)		(Ethiopia) Saint-George SA
7	MF	**Teshome Getu**	7 February 1983 (aged 18)		(Ethiopia) Banks SC
8	MF	**Girma Ashenafi**	28 July 1982 (aged 18)		(Ethiopia) Ethiopian Coffee
9	FW	**Yordanos Abay**	28 March 1984 (aged 17)		(Ethiopia) EEPCO
10	FW	Mengistu Getahun	19 September 1983 (aged 17)		(Ethiopia) Insurance Addis
11	FW	Seman Hussen	18 July 1983 (aged 17)		(Ethiopia) Ethiopian Coffee
12	MF	Abubakar Ismael	9 April 1983 (aged 18)		(Ethiopia) Saint-George SA
13	MF	Muleta Berihanu	28 October 1982 (aged 18)		(Ethiopia) Tsehay Gebat
14	MF	Admassu Hailu	10 August 1985 (aged 15)		(Ethiopia) EEPCO
15	DF	Elihu Bekele	24 October 1982 (aged 18)		(Ethiopia) Nyala
16	MF	**Dawit Mebratu**	13 June 1984 (aged 17)		(Ethiopia) Airlines
17	DF	**Solomon Andargachew**	28 October 1981 (aged 19)		(Ethiopia) Ethiopian Coffee
18	GK	Getachew Solomon	15 January 1984 (aged 17)		(Ethiopia) Insurance Addis

=== Netherlands ===
Head coach: (Netherlands) Louis van Gaal

No.	Pos.	Player	Date of birth (age)	Caps	Club
1	GK	**Maarten Stekelenburg**	22 September 1982 (aged 18)		(Netherlands) Ajax
2	DF	Jürgen Colin	20 January 1981 (aged 20)		(Netherlands) PSV
3	MF	René van Dieren	12 March 1981 (aged 20)		(Netherlands) Feyenoord
4	DF	**John Heitinga**	15 November 1983 (aged 17)		(Netherlands) Ajax
5	DF	Jeffrey Leiwakabessy	23 February 1981 (aged 20)		(Netherlands) NEC
6	MF	**David Mendes da Silva**	4 August 1982 (aged 18)		(Netherlands) Sparta Rotterdam
7	FW	Riga Mustapha	10 October 1981 (aged 19)		(Netherlands) Vitesse
8	FW	**Rafael van der Vaart**	11 February 1983 (aged 18)		(Netherlands) Ajax
9	FW	**Klaas-Jan Huntelaar**	12 August 1983 (aged 17)		(Netherlands) PSV
10	MF	Youssouf Hersi	20 August 1982 (aged 18)		(Netherlands) Ajax
11	FW	**Arjen Robben**	23 January 1984 (aged 17)		(Netherlands) Groningen
12	DF	Civard Sprockel	10 May 1983 (aged 18)		(Netherlands) Feyenoord
13	MF	Saïd Boutahar	12 August 1982 (aged 18)		(Netherlands) Feyenoord
14	MF	**Theo Janssen**	27 July 1981 (aged 19)		(Netherlands) Vitesse
15	FW	Thijs Houwing	22 April 1981 (aged 20)		(Netherlands) Twente
16	MF	Gregoor van Dijk	16 November 1981 (aged 19)		(Netherlands) Groningen
17	MF	Santi Kolk	2 October 1981 (aged 19)		(Netherlands) Heerenveen
18	GK	Gino Coutinho	5 August 1982 (aged 18)		(Netherlands) PSV
19	DF	**Glenn Loovens**	22 September 1983 (aged 17)		(Netherlands) Feyenoord
20	DF	Alje Schut	18 February 1981 (aged 20)		(Netherlands) Utrecht

== Group F ==
=== France ===
Head coach: (France) Raymond Domenech

No.	Pos.	Player	Date of birth (age)	Caps	Club
1	GK	Nicolas Penneteau	28 February 1981 (aged 20)		(France) Bastia
2	DF	Matthieu Delpierre	26 April 1981 (aged 20)		(France) Lille
3	DF	Grégory Vignal	19 July 1981 (aged 19)		(England) Liverpool
4	DF	**Gaël Givet**	9 October 1981 (aged 19)		(France) Monaco
5	DF	**Philippe Mexès**	30 March 1982 (aged 19)		(France) Auxerre
6	MF	Pascal Berenguer	20 May 1981 (aged 20)		(France) Bastia
7	MF	Benoît Cheyrou	3 May 1981 (aged 20)		(France) Lille
8	MF	Nicolas Fabiano	8 February 1981 (aged 20)		(Wales) Swansea City
9	MF	**Alou Diarra**	15 July 1981 (aged 19)		(Germany) Bayern Munich
10	FW	Mathieu Maton	19 January 1981 (aged 20)		(France) Lille
11	FW	Hassan Ahamada	13 April 1981 (aged 20)		(France) Nantes
12	FW	**Djibril Cissé**	12 August 1981 (aged 19)		(France) Auxerre
13	MF	Gaël Danic	19 November 1981 (aged 19)		(France) Rennes
14	DF	Jonathan Joseph-Augustin	13 May 1981 (aged 20)		(France) Guingamp
15	DF	**Bernard Mendy**	20 August 1981 (aged 19)		(France) Paris Saint-Germain
16	MF	Sébastien Roudet	16 June 1981 (aged 20)		(France) Châteauroux
17	FW	Hervé Bugnet	24 August 1981 (aged 19)		(France) Bordeaux
18	GK	Nicolas Puydebois	28 February 1981 (aged 20)		(France) Lyon
19	DF	Jean-Félix Dorothée	2 October 1981 (aged 19)		(France) Rennes

=== Ghana ===
Head coach: (Ghana) Emmanuel Afranie

No.	Pos.	Player	Date of birth (age)	Caps	Club
1	GK	Maxwell Banahene	7 September 1982 (aged 18)		(Ghana) Sekondi Hasaacas
2	MF	**Sulley Muntari**	27 August 1984 (aged 16)		(Ghana) Liberty Professionals
3	DF	Abbas Inusah	7 August 1982 (aged 18)		(Ghana) Real Sportive
4	MF	**Michael Essien**	3 December 1982 (aged 18)		(France) Bastia
5	DF	Patrick Villars	21 May 1984 (aged 17)		(Ghana) Ebusua Dwarfs
6	DF	**Emmanuel Pappoe**	3 March 1981 (aged 20)		(Ghana) Liberty Professionals
7	FW	Samuel Thompson	17 January 1982 (aged 19)		(Ghana) Top Allies
8	MF	**Ibrahim Abdul Razak**	18 April 1983 (aged 18)		(Italy) Empoli
9	FW	**Razak Pimpong**	30 December 1982 (aged 18)		(Denmark) Midtjylland
10	MF	**Derek Boateng**	2 May 1983 (aged 18)		(Greece) Panathinaikos
11	FW	Frank Osei	2 December 1982 (aged 18)		(Ghana) King Faisal
12	DF	Yussuf Issah	17 May 1982 (aged 19)		(Ghana) Sekondi Hasaacas
13	MF	**Anthony Obodai**	6 August 1982 (aged 18)		(Netherlands) Ajax
14	DF	**John Mensah**	26 November 1982 (aged 18)		(Switzerland) Bellinzona
15	DF	**John Paintsil**	15 June 1981 (aged 20)		(Ghana) Berekum Arsenal
16	MF	Kwaku Duah	28 February 1983 (aged 18)		(Ghana) Asante Kotoko
17	FW	James Owusu-Ansah	2 December 1981 (aged 19)		(Mexico) Cruz Azul
18	GK	**George Owu**	7 June 1982 (aged 19)		(Ghana) Sekondi Hasaacas

=== Iran ===
Head coach: (Iran) Mehdi Monajati

No.	Pos.	Player	Date of birth (age)	Caps	Club
1	GK	Ershad Yousefi	19 September 1981 (aged 19)		(Iran) Aboomoslem
2	DF	Amir Falahi	1 January 1983 (aged 18)		(Iran) Paykan Tehran
3	DF	Mahmoudreza Ashouri	6 March 1982 (aged 19)		(Iran) Esteghlal Rasht
4	DF	**Saeid Lotfi**	25 February 1981 (aged 20)		(Iran) Paykan Tehran
5	DF	Mostafa Salehinejad	21 March 1981 (aged 20)		(Iran) Zob Ahan
6	DF	Alireza Monajati	22 June 1981 (aged 19)		(Iran) Shahin
7	FW	Alireza Daghaghleh	20 January 1981 (aged 20)		(Iran) Foolad
8	FW	Bahram Esmaeili	17 March 1981 (aged 20)		(Iran) Fajr Sepasi
9	MF	**Iman Mobali**	3 November 1982 (aged 18)		(Iran) Foolad
10	FW	Mansour Jamalyan	3 May 1981 (aged 20)		(Iran) Paykan Tehran
11	FW	Reza Hadadi	3 March 1983 (aged 18)		(Iran) Teraktor Sazi
12	MF	Mohammad Ostovari	7 October 1986 (aged 14)		(Iran) Fajr Sepasi
13	DF	Samad Zare	16 September 1981 (aged 19)		(Iran) Zob Ahan
14	MF	Morteza Kashi	4 May 1981 (aged 20)		(Iran) Paykan Tehran
15	MF	**Mehrzad Madanchi**	9 January 1985 (aged 16)		(Iran) Homa Shiraz
16	MF	Mostafa Haghipour	21 May 1982 (aged 19)		(Iran) Pas
17	MF	**Javad Kazemian**	23 April 1981 (aged 20)		(Iran) Saipa
18	GK	Abbas Ghasemi	23 October 1982 (aged 18)		(Iran) Saipa

=== Paraguay ===
Head coach: (Paraguay) Cristóbal Maldonado

No.	Pos.	Player	Date of birth (age)	Caps	Club
1	GK	**Diego Barreto**	16 July 1981 (aged 19)		(Paraguay) Cerro Porteño
2	DF	**David Villalba**	13 April 1982 (aged 19)		(Paraguay) Olimpia
3	DF	**José Devaca**	18 September 1982 (aged 18)		(Italy) Udinese
4	DF	**Emilio Martínez**	10 April 1981 (aged 20)		(Paraguay) Cerro Porteño
5	DF	**Pedro Benítez**	23 March 1981 (aged 20)		(Paraguay) Sportivo Luqueño
6	MF	**Walter Fretes**	18 May 1982 (aged 19)		(Paraguay) Cerro Porteño
7	FW	**Alejandro da Silva**	18 May 1983 (aged 18)		(Italy) Udinese
8	MF	**Jorge Brítez**	8 February 1981 (aged 20)		(Portugal) Braga
9	FW	**Julio González**	26 August 1981 (aged 19)		(Paraguay) Guaraní
10	FW	Tomás Guzmán	7 March 1982 (aged 19)		(Italy) Juventus
11	FW	**Santiago Salcedo**	6 September 1981 (aged 19)		(Paraguay) Cerro Porteño
12	DF	**Celso Esquivel**	20 March 1981 (aged 20)		(Argentina) San Lorenzo de Almagro
13	DF	Gabriel Estigarribia	20 February 1981 (aged 20)		(Paraguay) Atlético Colegiales
14	MF	Felipe Giménez	26 May 1981 (aged 20)		(Paraguay) Olimpia
15	MF	**Osvaldo Díaz**	22 December 1981 (aged 19)		(Paraguay) Guaraní
16	FW	**Fredy Bareiro**	27 March 1982 (aged 19)		(Paraguay) 12 de Octubre
17	FW	**Cristian Fatecha**	15 March 1982 (aged 19)		(Paraguay) Sportivo Luqueño
18	GK	Eduardo Cáceres	12 August 1981 (aged 19)		(Paraguay) Sportivo Luqueño
19	MF	Diego Del Puerto	4 August 1981 (aged 19)		(Paraguay) San Lorenzo
20	FW	Pedro Sosa	6 April 1981 (aged 20)		(Paraguay) Sol de América
