= 1981 in France =

- Decades: 1960s; 1970s; 1980s; 1990s; 2000s
- See also: History of France; Timeline of French history; List of years in France

Events from the year 1981 in France.

== Incumbents ==
- President: Valéry Giscard d'Estaing (until 21 May), François Mitterrand (starting 21 May)
- Prime Minister: Raymond Barre (until 21 May), Pierre Mauroy (starting 21 May)

== Events ==
- 24 April – French presidential election: A first-round runoff results between Valéry Giscard d'Estaing and François Mitterrand.
- 10 May – Presidential Election won by François Mitterrand.
- 21 May – François Mitterrand becomes the first socialist President of the French Fifth Republic.
- 14 June – Legislative Election held.
- 21 June – Legislative Election held.
- September – Launch of the Renault 9, a small-four door family saloon with front-wheel drive which falls into the Renault range between the R14 and R18 model ranges. It will share a floorpan with a new hatchback model to replace the R14 from early 1983.
- 18 September – France abolishes capital punishment, four years after its final execution.
- 27 September – TGV high speed rail service between Paris and Lyon begins.
- December – The Renault 9 is voted European Car of the Year.
- 1 December – Inex-Adria Aviopromet Flight 1308 McDonnell Douglas MD-81 crashes into mountains in Corsica, killing 173 passengers and 7 crew.

== Births ==
=== January to March ===
- 4 January – Jean-Baptiste Paternotte, soccer player.
- 5 January – Sébastien Duthier, soccer player.
- 8 January – Mathieu Jost, ice dancer.
- 14 January – Myriam Baverel, taekwondo practitioner and Olympic medallist.
- 17 January – Thierry Ascione, tennis player.
- 17 January – Christophe Riblon, cyclist.
- 19 January – Maxime Laisney, politician.
- 19 January – Mathieu Maton, soccer player.
- 21 January – Florent Lacasse, athlete.
- 26 January – Edwin Ouon, soccer player.
- 1 February – David Martot, soccer player.
- 8 February – Bertrand Grospellier, pro gamer and poker player.
- 15 February – Nicolas Rostoucher, swimmer.
- 20 February – Nicolas Penneteau, soccer player.
- 22 February – Élodie Yung, actress
- 26 February – Jean-Pascal Mignot, soccer player.
- 28 February
  - Nicolas Puydebois, soccer player.
  - Florent Serra, tennis player
- 8 March – Laurent Pichon, soccer player.
- 16 March – Julien Mazet, cyclist.
- 18 March – Maxime Grésèque, rugby league player.
- 20 March – Sylvain Monsoreau, soccer player.
- 21 March – Sébastien Chavanel, cyclist.

=== April to June ===
- 6 April – Sébastien Grégori, soccer player.
- 13 April – Hassan Ahamada, soccer player.
- 16 April – Olivier Sorin, soccer player.
- 23 April – Vincent Bernardet, soccer player.
- 26 April – Matthieu Delpierre, soccer player.
- 2 May – Sébastien Maillard, athlete.
- 3 May – Benoît Cheyrou, soccer player.
- 7 May – Vincent Clerc, international rugby union player.
- 9 May – Ludwig Briand, actor.
- 9 May – Florine De Leymarie, Alpine skier.
- 13 May – Jonathan Joseph-Augustin, soccer player.
- 15 May – Patrice Evra, international soccer player.
- 22 May
  - Yorane Julians, basketball player.
  - Laurent Mangel, cyclist.
- 25 May – Thibault Giresse, soccer player.
- 2 June – Nicolas Plestan, soccer player.
- 7 June – David Attoub, rugby union player.
- 13 June – Guy Demel, soccer player.
- 16 June – Sébastien Roudet, soccer player.
- 30 June – Geoffroy Lequatre, cyclist.

=== July to September ===
- 15 July – Alou Diarra, soccer player.
- 19 July – Grégory Vignal, soccer player.
- 20 July – Jérôme Blanchard, pair skater.
- 28 July – Mathieu Béda, soccer player.
- 28 July – Vincent Restencourt, figure skater.
- 30 July – Sébastien Vaugeois, soccer player.
- 31 July – Sophie Duarte, athlete.
- 4 August – Frédérick Bousquet, swimmer.
- 6 August – Lucie Décosse, judoka.
- 12 August – Djibril Cissé, soccer player.
- 14 August – Adamo Coulibaly, soccer player.
- 20 August – Bernard Mendy, soccer player.
- 24 August – Hervé Bugnet, soccer player.
- 30 August – Grégory Béranger, soccer player.
- 3 September – Gautier Capuçon, cellist.
- 4 September – Gilles Rondy, swimmer.
- 16 September – Aurélien Boche, soccer player.
- 28 September – Loïc Loval, soccer player.
- 29 September – Julien Cardy, soccer player.

=== October to December ===
- 2 October – Jean-Félix Dorothée, soccer player.
- 4 October – Lionel Mathis, soccer player.
- 9 October – Gaël Givet, soccer player.
- 12 October – Guillaume Boussès, rugby union player.
- 30 October – Yohan Hautcoeur, soccer player.
- 30 October – Nicolas Laharrague, rugby union player.
- 1 November – Laurent Fressinet, chess Grandmaster.
- 1 November – Léo Margarit, musician.
- 17 November – Julien Brugnaut, rugby union player.
- 4 December – Thomas Pinault, soccer player.
- 19 December – Moussa Dabo, soccer player.
- 20 December – Julien Benneteau, tennis player.
- 25 December – La Fouine, rapper.
- 30 December – Cédric Carrasso, soccer player.

== Deaths ==
=== January to June ===
- 12 January – Marcel Gobillot, cyclist and Olympic medallist (born 1900).
- 13 February – René Taupin, translator, critic and academic (born 1905).
- 20 February – Nicolas de Gunzburg, magazine editor (born 1904).
- 27 February – Pierre Deley, pioneering pilot (born 1893).
- 15 March – René Clair, filmmaker (born 1898).
- 21 March – Roger Blaizot, General (born 1891).
- 16 April – Count Renaud de la Frégeolière, author and first president of the Fédération Internationale de Bobsleigh et de Tobogganing (born 1886).
- 25 April – Paul Bontemps, athlete and Olympic medallist (born 1902).
- 30 April – François Bordes, scientist, geologist, and archaeologist (born 1919).
- 31 May – Michel Rougerie, motorcycle racer (born 1950).
- 13 June – Joseph de Goislard de Monsabert, General (born 1887).

=== July to December ===
- 11 July – Jean-Jérôme Adam, Roman Catholic Archbishop of Libreville (born 1904).
- 9 September – Jacques Lacan, psychoanalyst, psychiatrist, and doctor (born 1901).
- 13 October – Philippe Étancelin, motor racing driver (born 1896).
- 16 October – Édouard Depreux, journalist, essayist and politician (born 1898).
- 29 October – Georges Brassens, singer and songwriter (born 1921).
- 3 November – Jean Eustache, filmmaker (born 1938).
- 10 November – Abel Gance, film director, producer, writer, actor and editor (born 1889).
- 25 November – Romain Bellenger, cyclist (born 1894).
- 5 December – Maurice d'Hartoy, soldier, politician and writer (born 1892).
- 30 December – Job de Roincé, journalist and writer (born 1896).

=== Full date unknown ===
- Colette de Jouvenel, daughter of writer Colette (born 1913).
