= 2001 FIFA World Youth Championship =

Copa Mundial Juvenil de la FIFA Argentina 2001

Tournament details
- Host country: Argentina
- Dates: 17 June – 8 July
- Teams: 24 (from 6 confederations)
- Venues: 6 (in 6 host cities)

Final positions
- Champions: Argentina (4th title)
- Runners-up: Ghana
- Third place: Egypt
- Fourth place: Paraguay

Tournament statistics
- Matches played: 52
- Goals scored: 149 (2.87 per match)
- Attendance: 506,320 (9,737 per match)
- Top scorer: (Argentina) Javier Saviola (11 goals)
- Best player: (Argentina) Javier Saviola
- Fair play award: Argentina

The 2001 FIFA World Youth Championship took place in Argentina between 17 June and 8 July 2001. The 2001 championship was the 13th contested. The tournament took part in six cities, Buenos Aires, Córdoba, Mendoza, Rosario, Salta, and Mar del Plata. The Golden Boot was won by Javier Saviola of Argentina who scored 11 goals.

== Qualification ==
The following 24 teams qualified for the 2001 FIFA World Youth Championship. Argentina qualified automatically as host.

Confederation	Qualifying Tournament	Qualifier(s)
AFC (Asia)	2000 AFC Youth Championship	China; Iran; Iraq; Japan
CAF (Africa)	2001 African Youth Championship	Angola^{1} Egypt; Ethiopia^{1} Ghana
CONCACAF (North, Central America & Caribbean)	2001 CONCACAF U-20 Tournament	Canada; Costa Rica; Jamaica^{1} United States
CONMEBOL (South America)	Host nation	Argentina
CONMEBOL (South America)	2001 South American Youth Championship	Brazil; Chile; Ecuador^{1} Paraguay
OFC (Oceania)	2001 OFC U-20 Championship	Australia
UEFA (Europe)	2000 UEFA European Under-18 Football Championship	Czech Republic^{2} Finland^{1} France; Germany; Netherlands; Ukraine^{1}

1.Teams that made their debut.
2.Czech Republic made their debut as independent nation. They were chosen as the descendant of the now-defunct Czechoslovakia, which qualified in 1983 and 1989 tournaments.

== Venues ==
Buenos Aires	2001 FIFA World Youth Championship is located in Argentina	Córdoba
José Amalfitani Stadium	2001 FIFA World Youth Championship is located in Argentina	Estadio Olímpico Chateau Carreras
Capacity: 49,540	2001 FIFA World Youth Championship is located in Argentina	Capacity: 57,000
Mendoza	2001 FIFA World Youth Championship is located in Argentina	Rosario
Estadio Malvinas Argentinas	2001 FIFA World Youth Championship is located in Argentina	Estadio Newell's Old Boys
Capacity: 40,268	2001 FIFA World Youth Championship is located in Argentina	Capacity: 42,000
Salta	2001 FIFA World Youth Championship is located in Argentina	Mar del Plata
Estadio Padre Ernesto Martearena	2001 FIFA World Youth Championship is located in Argentina	Estadio José María Minella
Capacity: 20,408	2001 FIFA World Youth Championship is located in Argentina	Capacity: 35,354

== Match officials ==
Confederation	Referee
AFC	Mark Shield (Australia)
AFC	Sun Baojie (China)
AFC	Toru Kamikawa (Japan)
AFC	Naser Al Hamdan (Saudi Arabia)
AFC	Shamsul Maidin (Singapore)
CAF	Coffi Codjia (Benin)
CAF	Hailemelak Tessema (Ethiopia)
CAF	Abdullhakim Shelmani (Libya)
CAF	Hichem Guirat (Tunisia)
CONCACAF
CONCACAF	José Pineda (Honduras)
CONCACAF	Jagdeesh Bhimull (Trinidad and Tobago)
CONCACAF	Kevin Stott (United States)
CONMEBOL	Claudio Martín (Argentina)
CONMEBOL	Wilson de Souza (Brazil)
CONMEBOL	Guido Aros (Chile)
CONMEBOL	Carlos Amarilla (Paraguay)
UEFA	Alain Hamer (Luxembourg)
UEFA	Terje Hauge (Norway)
UEFA	Sorin Corpodean (Romania)
UEFA	Mike McCurry (Scotland)
UEFA	Manuel Mejuto González (Spain)
UEFA	Orhan Erdemir (Turkey)

== Mascot ==
The Official Mascot of the 2001 FIFA World Youth Championship is a Rhea named Ñandy, he was created by an Argentine Illustrator Conrado Giusti https://tuchogiusti.wordpress.com/ilustracion/

== Sponsorship ==
=== FIFA partners ===
- Adidas
- Fujifilm
- JVC
- Avaya
- Coca-Cola
- Budweiser
- McDonald's
- Toshiba
- Hyundai
- MasterCard

=== National supporters ===
- FIFA.com
- FIFA Fair Play

=== Argentinian local partners ===
- Movicom
- Televisión Cable Color

== Group stage ==
All times in Argentina Standard Time: (UTC−03:00)

=== Group A ===
Pos	Team	Pld	W	D	L	GF	GA	GD	Pts	Group stage result
1	Argentina (H)	3	3	0	0	14	2	+12	9	Advance to knockout stage
2	Egypt	3	1	1	1	3	8	−5	4	Advance to knockout stage
3	Finland	3	1	0	2	2	4	−2	3	
4	Jamaica	3	0	1	2	1	6	−5	1	

(H) Hosts
17 June 2001
14:00

Argentina	2–0	Finland
Rodríguez 38'; D'Alessandro 67'	(Report)

José Amalfitani Stadium, Buenos Aires
Attendance: 24,000
Referee: Sun Baojie (China)

17 June 2001
16:45

Egypt	0–0	Jamaica
	(Report)

José Amalfitani Stadium, Buenos Aires
Attendance: 2,000
Referee: Guido Aros (Chile)

20 June 2001
14:00

Jamaica	0–1	Finland
	(Report)	Väyrynen 87'

José Amalfitani Stadium, Buenos Aires
Attendance: 4,000
Referee: Shamsul Maidin (Singapore)

20 June 2001
16:45

Egypt	1–7	Argentina
El Yamani 5'	(Report)	Saviola 7', 15', 44' (pen.); Coloccini 20'; Romagnoli 55'; Rodríguez 64'; Amin 67' (o.g.)

José Amalfitani Stadium, Buenos Aires
Attendance: 25,000
Referee: Alain Hamer (Luxembourg)

23 June 2001
14:00

Argentina	5–1	Jamaica
Coloccini 3'; Saviola 7', 86' (pen.); Herrera 14', 38'	(Report)	Dawkins 78'

José Amalfitani Stadium, Buenos Aires
Attendance: 27,000
Referee: Naser Al Hamdan (Saudi Arabia)

23 June 2001
16:45

Finland	1–2	Egypt
Sjölund 74'	(Report)	Hamza 10'; Riad 62'

José Amalfitani Stadium, Buenos Aires
Attendance: 3,000
Referee: Wilson de Souza (Brazil)

=== Group B ===
Pos	Team	Pld	W	D	L	GF	GA	GD	Pts	Group stage result
1	Brazil	3	3	0	0	10	1	+9	9	Advance to knockout stage
2	Germany	3	2	0	1	7	3	+4	6	Advance to knockout stage
3	Iraq	3	1	0	2	5	9	−4	3	
4	Canada	3	0	0	3	0	9	−9	0	

17 June 2001
14:00

Brazil	2–0	Germany
Robert 9', 22'	(Report)

Estadio Olímpico Chateau Carreras, Córdoba
Attendance: 5,100
Referee: Kevin Stott (United States)

17 June 2001
16:45

Iraq	3–0	Canada
Emad 21'; Siamand 33'; Hantoush 43'	(Report)

Estadio Olímpico Chateau Carreras, Córdoba
Attendance: 5,100
Referee: Coffi Codjia (Benin)

20 June 2001
14:00

Canada	0–4	Germany
	(Report)	Auer 18', 67', 70'; Preuss 83'

Estadio Olímpico Chateau Carreras, Córdoba
Attendance: 1,000
Referee: Hailemelak Tessema (Ethiopia)

20 June 2001
16:45

Iraq	1–6	Brazil
Emad 82'	(Report)	Fernando 8' (pen.); Pinga 13'; Robert 27', 72'; Adriano 29', 45'

Estadio Olímpico Chateau Carreras, Córdoba
Attendance: 1,000
Referee: Sorin Corpodean (Romania)

23 June 2001
14:00

Brazil	2–0	Canada
Adriano 21'; Robert 65'	(Report)

Estadio Olímpico Chateau Carreras, Córdoba
Attendance: 1,500
Referee: Jagdeesh Bhimull (Trinidad and Tobago)

23 June 2001
16:45

Germany	3–1	Iraq
Preuss 40'; Munaim 60' (o.g.); Auer 65'	(Report)	Lapaczinski 37' (o.g.)

Estadio Olímpico Chateau Carreras, Córdoba
Attendance: 2,000
Referee: Hichem Guirat (Tunisia)

=== Group C ===
Pos	Team	Pld	W	D	L	GF	GA	GD	Pts	Group stage result
1	Ukraine	3	1	2	0	5	3	+2	5	Advance to knockout stage
2	United States	3	1	1	1	5	3	+2	4	Advance to knockout stage
3	China	3	1	1	1	1	1	0	4	Advance to knockout stage
4	Chile	3	1	0	2	4	8	−4	3	

17 June 2001
14:00

United States	0–1	China
	(Report)	Qu Bo 50'

Estadio Malvinas Argentinas, Mendoza
Attendance: 7,500
Referee: Hichem Guirat (Tunisia)

17 June 2001
16:45

Chile	2–4	Ukraine
Millar 38'; Pardo 90+2'	(Report)	Byelik 14', 50'; Oyarzún 36' (o.g.); Valeyev 78'

Estadio Malvinas Argentinas, Mendoza
Attendance: 7,500
Referee: Naser Al Hamdan (Saudi Arabia)

20 June 2001
14:00

Ukraine	0–0	China
	(Report)

Estadio Malvinas Argentinas, Mendoza
Attendance: 3,500
Referee: Jagdeesh Bhimull (Trinidad and Tobago)

20 June 2001
16:45

Chile	1–4	United States
Valdés 28'	(Report)	Beasley 6', 40'; Davis 69'; Buddle 75'

Estadio Malvinas Argentinas, Mendoza
Attendance: 5,500
Referee: Claudio Martín (Argentina)

23 June 2001
14:00

United States	1–1	Ukraine
Arena 39'	(Report)	Stoyan 89'

Estadio Malvinas Argentinas, Mendoza
Attendance: 7,000
Referee: Carlos Amarilla (Paraguay)

23 June 2001
16:45

China	0–1	Chile
	(Report)	Berrios 87'

Estadio Malvinas Argentinas, Mendoza
Attendance: 8,000
Referee: Coffi Codjia (Benin)

=== Group D ===
Pos	Team	Pld	W	D	L	GF	GA	GD	Pts	Group stage result
1	Angola	3	1	2	0	3	2	+1	5	Advance to knockout stage
2	Czech Republic	3	1	1	1	3	3	0	4	Advance to knockout stage
3	Australia	3	1	1	1	3	4	−1	4	Advance to knockout stage
4	Japan	3	1	0	2	4	4	0	3	

18 June 2001
14:00

Angola	0–0	Czech Republic
	(Report)

Estadio Newell's Old Boys, Rosario
Attendance: 1,500
Referee: José Pineda (Honduras)

18 June 2001
16:45

Japan	0–2	Australia
	(Report)	Haneda 59' (o.g.); Owens 69'

Estadio Newell's Old Boys, Rosario
Attendance: 5,000
Referee: Orhan Erdemir (Turkey)

21 June 2001
14:00

Australia	0–3	Czech Republic
	(Report)	Musil 27'; Jun 30'; Macek 47'

Estadio Newell's Old Boys, Rosario
Attendance: 1,200
Referee: Carlos Amarilla (Paraguay)

21 June 2001
16:45

Japan	1–2	Angola
Yamase 61'	(Report)	Mendonça 9'; Rasca 81'

Estadio Newell's Old Boys, Rosario
Attendance: 2,000
Referee: Manuel Mejuto González (Spain)

24 June 2001
14:00

Angola	1–1	Australia
Mantorras 12'	(Report)	Owens 82' (pen.)

Estadio Newell's Old Boys, Rosario
Attendance: 3,500
Referee: Alain Hamer (Luxembourg)

24 June 2001
16:45

Czech Republic	0–3	Japan
	(Report)	Morisaki 74'; Yamase 80'; Tahara 87'

Estadio Newell's Old Boys, Rosario
Attendance: 8,500
Referee: Kevin Stott (United States)

=== Group E ===
Pos	Team	Pld	W	D	L	GF	GA	GD	Pts	Group stage result
1	Costa Rica	3	3	0	0	7	2	+5	9	Advance to knockout stage
2	Ecuador	3	1	1	1	3	3	0	4	Advance to knockout stage
3	Netherlands	3	1	1	1	5	6	−1	4	Advance to knockout stage
4	Ethiopia	3	0	0	3	4	8	−4	0	

18 June 2001
14:00

Ecuador	2–1	Ethiopia
Miña 25'; Guagua 63'	(Report)	Andargachew 4'

Estadio Padre Ernesto Martearena, Salta
Attendance: 14,000
Referee: Mark Shield (Australia)

18 June 2001
16:45

Netherlands	1–3	Costa Rica
Hersi 63'	(Report)	Montero 38'; Parks 48', 54'

Estadio Padre Ernesto Martearena, Salta
Attendance: 14,000
Referee: Abdullhakim Shelmani (Libya)

21 June 2001
14:00

Costa Rica	3–1	Ethiopia
Parks 8', 49'; Scott 61'	(Report)	Yordanos 90+2'

Estadio Padre Ernesto Martearena, Salta
Attendance: 10,000
Referee: Mike McCurry (Scotland)

21 June 2001
16:45

Ecuador	1–1	Netherlands
Vargas 85'	(Report)	Colin 21'

Estadio Padre Ernesto Martearena, Salta
Attendance: 10,000
Referee: Toru Kamikawa (Japan)

24 June 2001
14:00

Ecuador	0–1	Costa Rica
	(Report)	Hernández 85'

Estadio Padre Ernesto Martearena, Salta
Attendance: 15,000
Referee: Terje Hauge (Norway)

24 June 2001
16:45

Ethiopia	2–3	Netherlands
Zewdu 52' (pen.); Andargachew 90+2'	(Report)	Kolk 22'; Hersi 41'; Huntelaar 78'

Estadio Padre Ernesto Martearena, Salta
Attendance: 17,000
Referee: Abdullhakim Shelmani (Libya)

=== Group F ===
Pos	Team	Pld	W	D	L	GF	GA	GD	Pts	Group stage result
1	Ghana	3	2	1	0	3	1	+2	7	Advance to knockout stage
2	France	3	1	2	0	7	2	+5	5	Advance to knockout stage
3	Paraguay	3	1	1	1	5	4	+1	4	Advance to knockout stage
4	Iran	3	0	0	3	0	8	−8	0	

18 June 2001
14:00

Ghana	2–1	Paraguay
Essien 58'; Boateng 63'	(Report)	Guzmán 69'

Estadio José María Minella, Mar del Plata
Attendance: 2,000
Referee: Terje Hauge (Norway)

18 June 2001
16:45

France	5–0	Iran
Bugnet 59'; Mexès 62'; Cissé 66', 87', 90'	(Report)

Estadio José María Minella, Mar del Plata
Attendance: 4,500
Referee: Wilson de Souza (Brazil)

21 June 2001
14:00

France	2–2	Paraguay
Bugnet 10'; Cissé 48'	(Report)	Fretes 53'; Devaca 72'

Estadio José María Minella, Mar del Plata
Attendance: 4,575
Referee: Mark Shield (Australia)

21 June 2001
16:45

Iran	0–1	Ghana
	(Report)	Boateng 44'

Estadio José María Minella, Mar del Plata
Attendance: 3,950
Referee: Alain Hamer (Luxembourg)

24 June 2001
14:00

Ghana	0–0	France
	(Report)

Estadio José María Minella, Mar del Plata
Attendance: 13,000
Referee: Claudio Martín (Argentina)

24 June 2001
16:45

Paraguay	2–0	Iran
González 72'; Giménez 89'	(Report)

Estadio José María Minella, Mar del Plata
Attendance: 6,000
Referee: Manuel Mejuto González (Spain)

=== Ranking of third-placed teams ===
Pos	Grp	Team	Pld	W	D	L	GF	GA	GD	Pts	Result
1	F	Paraguay	3	1	1	1	5	4	+1	4	Advance to knockout stage
2	C	China	3	1	1	1	1	1	0	4	Advance to knockout stage
3	E	Netherlands	3	1	1	1	5	6	−1	4	Advance to knockout stage
4	D	Australia	3	1	1	1	3	4	−1	4	Advance to knockout stage
5	A	Finland	3	1	0	2	2	4	−2	3	
6	B	Iraq	3	1	0	2	5	9	−4	3	

== Knockout stage ==
=== Bracket ===
Round of 16
27 June – Buenos Aires
Argentina	2
China	1
27 June – Córdoba
France	3
Germany	2
28 June – Salta
Costa Rica	1
Czech Republic	2
28 June – Mendoza
Ukraine	1
Paraguay	2
28 June – Rosario
Angola	0
Netherlands	2
27 June – Buenos Aires
United States	0
Egypt	2
28 June – Mar del Plata
Ghana	1
Ecuador	0
27 June – Córdoba
Brazil	4
Australia	0

Quarter-finals
1 July – Buenos Aires
Argentina	3
France	1
1 July – Mendoza
Czech Republic	0
Paraguay	1
1 July – Rosario
Netherlands	1
Egypt	2
1 July – Córdoba
Ghana (a.e.t.)	2
Brazil	1

Semi-finals
4 July – Buenos Aires
Argentina	5
Paraguay	0
4 July – Córdoba
Egypt	0
Ghana	2

Final
8 July – Buenos Aires
Argentina	3
Ghana	0
Third place
8 July – Buenos Aires
Paraguay	0
Egypt	1

=== Round of 16 ===
27 June 2001
14:00

United States	0–2	Egypt
	(Report)	Riad 76' (pen.); El Yamani 88'

José Amalfitani Stadium, Buenos Aires
Attendance: 10,000
Referee: Sorin Corpodean (Romania)

27 June 2001
14:00

France	3–2	Germany
Cissé 34' (pen.), 90+3'; Mendy 41'	(Report)	Auer 19'; Burkhardt 78'

Estadio Olímpico Chateau Carreras, Córdoba
Attendance: 3,500
Referee: Guido Aros (Chile)

27 June 2001
17:00

Argentina	2–1	China
Rodríguez 4'; Domínguez 79'	(Report)	Qu Bo 55'

José Amalfitani Stadium, Buenos Aires
Attendance: 32,000
Referee: Mike McCurry (Scotland)

27 June 2001
17:00

Brazil	4–0	Australia
Adriano 27', 66'; Kaká 53'; Eduardo Costa 74'	(Report)

Estadio Olímpico Chateau Carreras, Córdoba
Attendance: 7,895
Referee: Toru Kamikawa (Japan)

28 June 2001
14:00

Ukraine	1–2	Paraguay
Bielyk 90'	(Report)	Benítez 19'; González 43'

Estadio Malvinas Argentinas, Mendoza
Attendance: 9,000
Referee: José Pineda (Honduras)

28 June 2001
14:00

Costa Rica	1–2	Czech Republic
Scott 24'	(Report)	Musil 21'; Jun 71'

Estadio Padre Ernesto Martearena, Salta
Attendance: 13,000
Referee: Hailemelak Tessema (Ethiopia)

28 June 2001
16:45

Angola	0–2	Netherlands
	(Report)	Mustapha 52'; Huntelaar 86'

Estadio Newell's Old Boys, Rosario
Attendance: 5,000
Referee: Shamsul Maidin (Singapore)

28 June 2001
16:45

Ghana	1–0	Ecuador
Mensah 37'	(Report)

Estadio José María Minella, Mar del Plata
Attendance: 11,000
Referee: Orhan Edemir (Turkey)

=== Quarter-finals ===
1 July 2001
14:00

Argentina	3–1	France
Saviola 5', 45+1' (pen.), 83'	(Report)	Mexès 44'

José Amalfitani Stadium, Buenos Aires
Attendance: 32,000
Referee: Terje Hauge (Norway)

1 July 2001
14:00

Czech Republic	0–1	Paraguay
	(Report)	Salcedo 31'

Estadio Malvinas Argentinas, Mendoza
Attendance: 6,000
Referee: Coffi Codjia (Benin)

1 July 2001
16:45

Ghana	2–1 (a.e.t.)	Brazil
Abdul Razak 80'; Mensah 93'	(Report)	Adriano 44'

Estadio Olímpico Chateau Carreras, Córdoba
Attendance: 11,000
Referee: Manuel Mejuto González (Spain)

1 July 2001
16:45

Netherlands	1–2	Egypt
Van der Vaart 33'	(Report)	Amin 47'; El Yamani 65'

Estadio Newell's Old Boys, Rosario
Attendance: 6,500
Referee: Claudio Martín (Argentina)

=== Semi-finals ===
4 July 2001
14:00

Egypt	0–2	Ghana
	(Report)	Inusah 83'; El Atrawy 88' (o.g.)

Estadio Olímpico Chateau Carreras, Córdoba
Attendance: 10,000
Referee: Mark Shield (Australia)

4 July 2001
16:45

Argentina	5–0	Paraguay
Saviola 18', 24'; Romagnoli 41'; D'Alessandro 52'; Herrera 70'	(Report)

José Amalfitani Stadium, Buenos Aires
Attendance: 32,000
Referee: Wilson de Souza (Brazil)

=== Third place play-off ===
8 July 2001
13:00

Paraguay	0–1	Egypt
	(Report)	El Yamani 64'

José Amalfitani Stadium, Buenos Aires
Attendance: 10,000
Referee: Toru Kamikawa (Japan)

=== Final ===
8 July 2001
15:45

Argentina	3–0	Ghana
Colotto 6'; Saviola 14'; Rodríguez 73'	Report

José Amalfitani Stadium, Buenos Aires
Attendance: 32,000
Referee: Manuel Mejuto González (Spain)

Team details

Argentina
Ghana

GK	18	Germán Lux
CB	4	Mauro Cetto
CB	2	Nicolás Burdisso
CB	13	Diego Colotto		Substituted off
DM	14	Leonardo Ponzio	Booked
DM	5	Nicolás Medina		Substituted off
CM	3	Julio Arca (c)
AM	10	Leandro Romagnoli
AM	15	Andrés D'Alessandro		Substituted off
CF	7	Javier Saviola
CF	11	Maxi Rodríguez
Substitutes:
DF	12	Ariel Seltzer		Substituted on
FW	16	Mauro Rosales		Substituted on
FW	9	Esteban Herrera		Substituted on
Manager:
José Pekerman

GK	1	Maxwell Banahene
RB	15	John Paintsil
CB	14	John Mensah	Booked
CB	5	Patrick Villars
LB	10	Derek Boateng
DM	4	Michael Essien
RM	16	Kwaku Duah		Substituted off
LM	2	Sulley Muntari	Booked
AM	8	Ibrahim Abdul Razak
CF	9	Razak Pimpong		Substituted off
CF	6	Emmanuel Pappoe (c)
Substitutes:
FW	7	Samuel Thompson		Substituted on
FW	11	Frank Osei		Substituted on
Manager:
Emmanuel Afranie

== Result ==
FIFA World Youth Championship 2001 winners

Argentina
Fourth title

== Goalscorers ==
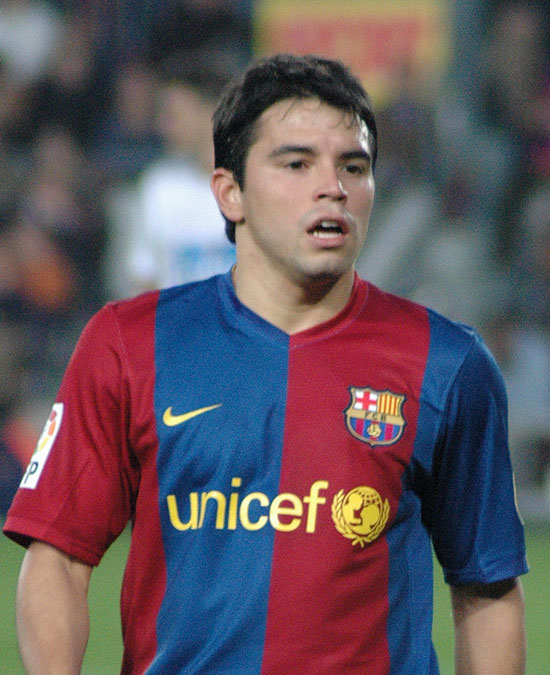
Javier Saviola, top scorer

11 goals

- (Argentina) Javier Saviola

6 goals

- (Brazil) Adriano
- (France) Djibril Cissé

5 goals

- (Brazil) Robert
- (Germany) Benjamin Auer

4 goals

- (Argentina) Maxi Rodríguez
- (Costa Rica) Winston Parks
- (Egypt) Mohamed El Yamani

3 goals

- (Argentina) Esteban Herrera
- (Ukraine) Oleksiy Byelik

2 goals

- (Argentina) Fabricio Coloccini
- (Argentina) Andrés D'Alessandro
- (Argentina) Leandro Romagnoli
- (Australia) Greg Owens
- (China) Qu Bo
- (Costa Rica) Erick Scott
- (Czech Republic) Tomáš Jun
- (Czech Republic) Petr Musil
- (Egypt) Wael Riad
- (Ethiopia) Solomon Andargachew
- (France) Hervé Bugnet
- (France) Philippe Mexès
- (Germany) Christoph Preuß
- (Ghana) Derek Boateng
- (Ghana) John Mensah
- (Iraq) Emad Mohammed
- (Japan) Koji Yamase
- (Netherlands) Youssouf Hersi
- (Netherlands) Klaas-Jan Huntelaar
- (Paraguay) Julio González
- (United States) DaMarcus Beasley

1 goal

- (Angola) Mantorras
- (Angola) Mendonça
- (Angola) Rasca
- (Argentina) Diego Colotto
- (Argentina) Alejandro Domínguez
- (Brazil) Eduardo Costa
- (Brazil) Fernando
- (Brazil) Kaká
- (Brazil) Pinga
- (Chile) Mario Berrios
- (Chile) Rodrigo Millar
- (Chile) Sebastián Pardo
- (Chile) Jaime Valdés
- (Costa Rica) Carlos Hernández
- (Costa Rica) Christian Montero
- (Czech Republic) Michal Macek
- (Ecuador) Jorge Guagua
- (Ecuador) Roberto Miña
- (Ecuador) Jorge Vargas
- (Egypt) Hussein Amin
- (Egypt) Gamal Hamza
- (Ethiopia) Abay Yordanos
- (Ethiopia) Bekele Zewdu
- (Finland) Daniel Sjölund
- (Finland) Mika Väyrynen
- (France) Bernard Mendy
- (Germany) Thorsten Burkhardt
- (Ghana) Ibrahim Abdul Razak
- (Ghana) Michael Essien
- (Ghana) Abbas Inusah
- (Iraq) Ammar Hanoosh
- (Iraq) Salah Al-Deen Siamand
- (Jamaica) Fabian Dawkins
- (Japan) Koji Morisaki
- (Japan) Yutaka Tahara
- (Netherlands) Jurgen Colin
- (Netherlands) Santi Kolk
- (Netherlands) Rahamat Mustapha
- (Netherlands) Rafael van der Vaart
- (Paraguay) Pedro Benítez
- (Paraguay) José Devaca
- (Paraguay) Walter Fretes
- (Paraguay) Felipe Giménez
- (Paraguay) Tomás Guzmán
- (Paraguay) Santiago Salcedo
- (Ukraine) Denis Stoyan
- (Ukraine) Ruslan Valeyev
- (United States) Kenny Arena
- (United States) Edson Buddle
- (United States) Brad Davis

== Awards ==
Golden Shoe	Golden Ball	FIFA Fair Play Award
(Argentina) Javier Saviola	(Argentina) Javier Saviola	Argentina

== Final ranking ==
Pos	Team	Pld	W	D	L	GF	GA	GD	Pts	Final result
1	Argentina (H)	7	7	0	0	27	4	+23	21	Champions
2	Ghana	7	5	1	1	8	5	+3	16	Runners-up
3	Egypt	7	4	1	2	8	11	−3	13	Third place
4	Paraguay	7	3	1	3	8	11	−3	10	Fourth place
5	Brazil	5	4	0	1	15	3	+12	12	Eliminated in Quarter-finals
6	France	5	2	2	1	11	7	+4	8	Eliminated in Quarter-finals
7	Netherlands	5	2	1	2	8	8	0	7	Eliminated in Quarter-finals
8	Czech Republic	5	2	1	2	5	5	0	7	Eliminated in Quarter-finals
9	Costa Rica	4	3	0	1	8	4	+4	9	Eliminated in Round of 16
10	Germany	4	2	0	2	9	6	+3	6	Eliminated in Round of 16
11	Ukraine	4	1	2	1	6	5	+1	5	Eliminated in Round of 16
12	Angola	4	1	2	1	3	4	−1	5	Eliminated in Round of 16
13	United States	4	1	1	2	5	5	0	4	Eliminated in Round of 16
14	Ecuador	4	1	1	2	3	4	−1	4	Eliminated in Round of 16
15	China	4	1	1	2	2	3	−1	4	Eliminated in Round of 16
16	Australia	4	1	1	2	3	8	−5	4	Eliminated in Round of 16
17	Japan	3	1	0	2	4	4	0	3	Eliminated in Group stage
18	Finland	3	1	0	2	2	4	−2	3	Eliminated in Group stage
19	Iraq	3	1	0	2	5	9	−4	3	Eliminated in Group stage
20	Chile	3	1	0	2	4	8	−4	3	Eliminated in Group stage
21	Jamaica	3	0	1	2	1	6	−5	1	Eliminated in Group stage
22	Ethiopia	3	0	0	3	4	8	−4	0	Eliminated in Group stage
23	Iran	3	0	0	3	0	8	−8	0	Eliminated in Group stage
24	Canada	3	0	0	3	0	9	−9	0	Eliminated in Group stage

Source: rsssf.com
(H) Hosts
