= Ruslan Valeyev =

Ukrainian footballer

Personal information
- Full name: Ruslan Salavatovych Valeyev
- Date of birth: 31 October 1981 (age 44)
- Place of birth: Odesa, Ukrainian SSR, Soviet Union
- Height: 1.75 m (5 ft 9 in)
- Position: Midfielder

Team information
- Current team: FC Büderich (assistant manager)

Youth career
- Chornomorets

Senior career*
Years	Team	Apps	(Gls)
1998–2000	Borussia Mönchengladbach	0	(0)
2000–2005	De Graafschap	129	(16)
2005–2007	FC Emmen	52	(4)
2007–2009	Chornomorets Odesa	0	(0)
2010	FC Shinnik Yaroslavl	9	(0)

International career
1999–2001	Ukraine U18	20	(3)
2001–2002	Ukraine U21	6	(1)

Managerial career
- 2017–: FC Büderich (assistant)
Medal record
Men's football
Representing Ukraine
UEFA European Under-18 Championship
Runner-up	2000 Germany
- * Club domestic league appearances and goals

Ruslan Valeyev (Ukrainian: Руслан Салаватович Валєєв; born 31 October 1981) is a Ukrainian former professional footballer who played as a midfielder.

== Club career ==
Valeyev was born in Odesa, Ukrainian SSR, Soviet Union. He got his first football training at the youth team of Chornomorets. However, in 1998 he moved to Germany to continue his training with the Bundesliga club Borussia Mönchengladbach, where he trained alongside his friend Andriy Voronin.

From there, in 2000, Valeyev moved to play in the Eredivisie, for De Graafschap. He spent five years with the team, amassing 129 caps and scoring 16 goals. In the 2002–03 season he suffered an injury sidelining him for a part of the season, in which time De Graafschap were relegated to the Eerste Divisie. He stayed with the team for the next season, helping the team return to the Eredivisie. The following season was not as good for Ruslan, as he only managed one goal in 18 appearances. The club was again relegated to the Eerste Divisie.

Valeyev had offers from a few clubs in the Eredivisie but chose to sign a one-year contract with FC Emmen who were playing in the Eerste Divisie. After a good first season he signed another one-year contract. Valeyev played for Emmen in 54 games and managed to score 4 goals. In July 2007, Valeyev returned to play for his home club Chornomorets, where his younger brother Rinar Valeyev is also a player.

== International career ==
Valeyev was capped 20 times for the Ukraine U20 national team, scoring 3 goals, as well as playing 6 times and scoring one international goal for the Ukraine U21. He was a member of the U19 team that finished second at the UEFA European Under-19 Football Championship in 2000. He also participated in the 2001 FIFA World Youth Championship tournament in Argentina, reaching the Round of 16.

== See also ==
- 2001 FIFA World Youth Championship squads § Ukraine
