= Mykola Nakonechnyi =

Ukrainian footballer

Personal information
- Full name: Mykola Leonidovich Nakonechnyi
- Date of birth: 10 September 1981 (age 45)
- Place of birth: Ukrainian SSR, Soviet Union
- Height: 1.75 m (5 ft 9 in)
- Position: Midfielder

Senior career*
Years	Team	Apps	(Gls)
1997–2003	Borysfen Boryspil	106	(8)
2000	→ Rihonda Bila Tserkva (loan)	1	(0)
2001–2003	→ Borysfen-2 Boryspil	2	(0)
2002	→ Arsenal Kyiv (loan)	12	(1)
2003–2004	Arsenal Kyiv	23	(1)
2003	→ CSKA Kyiv	1	(0)
2005	Obolon Kyiv	12	(0)
2005	→ Obolon-2 Kyiv	4	(0)
2007	Arsenal-Kyivshchyna Bila Tserkva	7	(1)
2009	Zenit Boyarka	4	(2)
2009	Yednist' Plysky	11	(2)
2010–2012	Gagra	25	(1)
2012	Volyn Lutsk	0	(0)
2014	Retro Vatutine	10	(1)
2014–2015	Yednist' Plysky	27	(4)

International career
1999–2000	Ukraine U19	3	(0)
2000–2001	Ukraine U21	9	(4)
- * Club domestic league appearances and goals

Mykola Nakonechnyi (born 10 September 1981) is a retired Ukrainian football player.

== Honors ==
- Pirveli Liga: 2010–2011
- Georgian Cup: 2010–2011

== See also ==
- 2001 FIFA World Youth Championship squads#Ukraine
