= Girma Ashenafi =

Ethiopian footballer

Personal information
- Full name: Girma Ashenafi
- Date of birth: 28 July 1982 (age 44)
- Place of birth: Dire Dawa, Ethiopia
- Position: Midfielder

Senior career*
Years	Team	Apps	(Gls)
2000–2005	Ethiopian Coffee	?	(?)
2005	Al-Hilal Hudayda	?	(?)
2005–2006	EEPCO		
2006–2007	Ethiopian Coffee		
2007–2008	Al-Sha'ab Hadramaut		
2008–2016	Dire Dawa City		

International career
2002–2010	Ethiopia	11	(2)
- * Club domestic league appearances and goals as of 1 June 2018

Girma Ashenafi (Amharic: ግርማ አሸናፊ; born 28 July 1982) is a former Ethiopian footballer. He was born in Dire Dawa.

Ashenafi played for Ethiopia at the 2001 FIFA World Youth Championship in Argentina.
