= Cristian Montero =

Costa Rican footballer (born 1982)

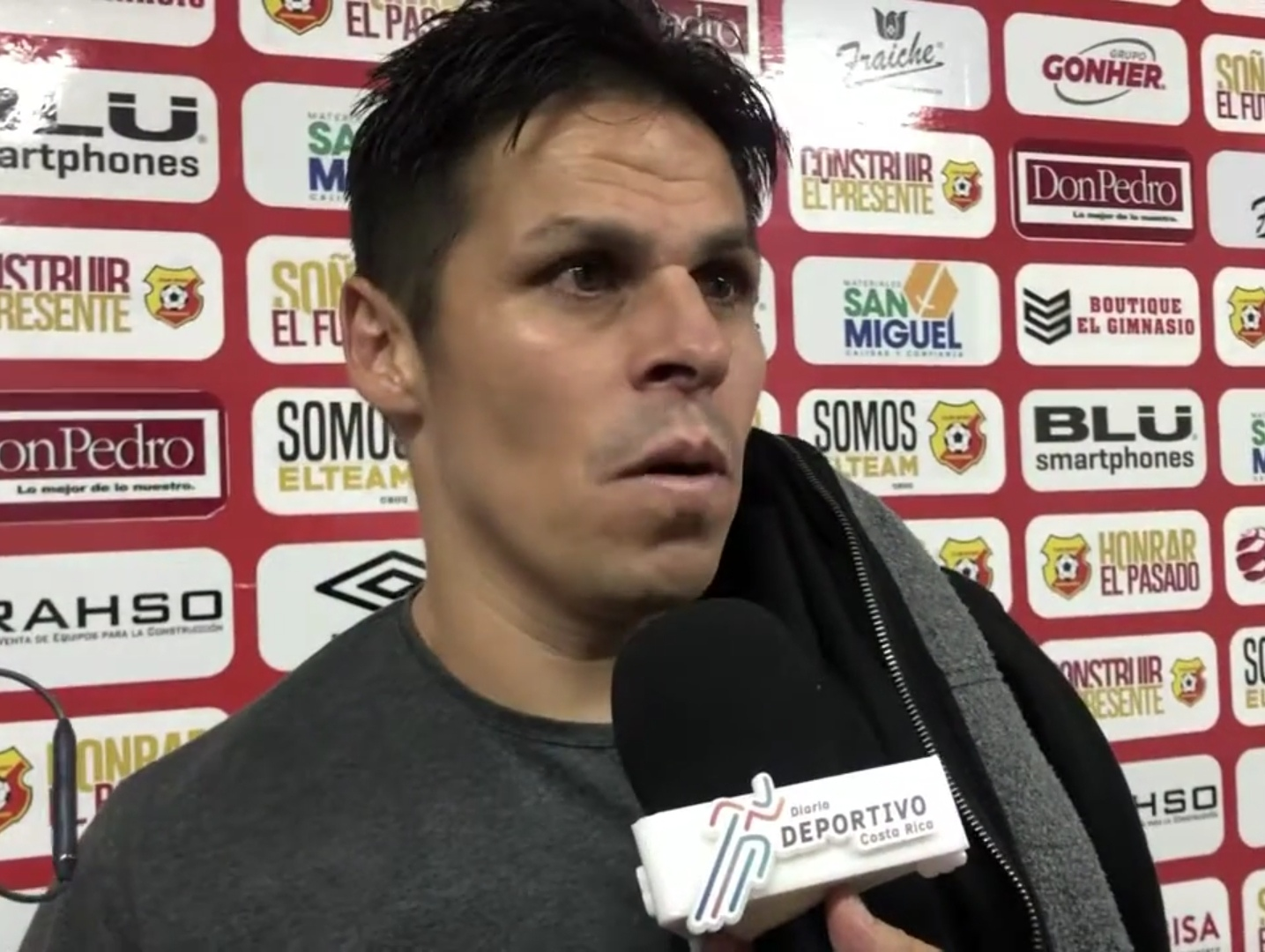

Personal information
- Full name: Cristian Montero Fallas
- Date of birth: 24 June 1982 (age 44)
- Place of birth: Alajuela, Costa Rica
- Height: 1.76 m (5 ft 9 in)
- Position: Centre back

Team information
- Current team: FC Desamparados

Senior career*
Years	Team	Apps	(Gls)
2001–2009	Alajuelense	194	(5)
2009–2015	Herediano	204	(8)
2015–2016	Uruguay	34	(0)
2016–2017	San Carlos	29	(0)
2017–2018	Juventud Escazuceña		
2018	Curridabat FC		
2019	La U Universitarios	27	(1)
2020–	FC Desamparados		

International career
2005–2009	Costa Rica	6	(0)
- * Club domestic league appearances and goals as of 22 September 2014

Cristian Montero Fallas (born 24 June 1982) is a Costa Rican professional football player who currently plays for Herediano in the Costa Rican Primera División.

== Club career ==
Montero started his career at Alajuelense in 2001 before moving to Herediano in 2009.

On 3 December 2019 Fútbol Consultants Desamparados confirmed, that 37-year old Montero would join the club for the 2020 season.

== International career ==
Montero He also participated in the 2001 FIFA World Youth Championship in Argentina.

He made his senior debut for Costa Rica in a February 2005 FIFA World Cup qualification match against Mexico and earned a total of 6 caps, scoring no goals. He represented his country in 6 FIFA World Cup qualification matches.

His final international was an October 2009 World Cup qualification match against the United States.
