= Denys Stoyan =

Ukrainian footballer (born 1981)

Personal information
- Full name: Denys Stoyan
- Date of birth: 24 August 1981 (age 45)
- Place of birth: Hrebinky, Ukrainian SSR, Soviet Union
- Height: 1.80 m (5 ft 11 in)
- Position: Defender

Youth career
- Borysfen Boryspil

Senior career*
Years	Team	Apps	(Gls)
1997–2003	Borysfen Boryspil	145	(3)
2000	→ Rihonda Bila Tserkva (loan)	2	(0)
2002	→ Borysfen-2 Boryspil	2	(0)
2004	Chornomorets Odesa	37	(0)
2004	→ Chornomorets-2 Odesa	2	(0)
2004–2007	Vorskla Poltava	81	(1)
2007–2008	Tavriya Simferopol	12	(0)
2008	Desna Chernihiv	10	(0)
2009	Mykolaiv	5	(0)
2009	Kaisar	7	(0)
2010	Bukovyna Chernivtsi	5	(0)
2010–2012	Zirka Kirovohrad	51	(0)
2012	Poltava	2	(0)
2014–2015	Yednist Plysky		
Medal record
Men's football
Representing Ukraine
UEFA European Under-18 Championship
Runner-up	2000 Germany
- * Club domestic league appearances and goals

Denys Stoyan (born 24 August 1981) is a retired Ukrainian football defender.

Stoyan was on a scorelist at the 2001 FIFA World Youth Championship for Ukraine.

== See also ==
- 2001 FIFA World Youth Championship squads#Ukraine
