= Mario Berríos (Chilean footballer) =

Chilean footballer (born 1981)

Personal information
- Full name: Mario Esteban Berríos Jara
- Date of birth: 20 August 1981 (age 45)
- Place of birth: Santiago, Chile
- Height: 1.81 m (5 ft 11 in)
- Position: Defender

Senior career*
Years	Team	Apps	(Gls)
2001–2005	Palestino	79	(3)
2006	OFK Beograd	0	(0)
2007	Coquimbo Unido	9	(0)
2007–2008	Perak FA		
2009–2010	Santiago Morning	16	(1)
2010–2017	Unión La Calera	133	(9)
Total		237	(13)

International career
2001	Chile U20	7	(1)
- * Club domestic league appearances and goals

Mario Esteban Berríos Jara (born 20 August 1981) is a Chilean former footballer who played as a defender.

== Club career ==
Born in Santiago, Berríos started out at Palestino and played for the club for several seasons, before moving to Europe. He was signed by Serbia and Montenegro Cup runners-up OFK Beograd in May 2006. Despite featuring in pre-season friendlies, and even scoring goals, Berríos failed to make his official debut for the Serbian club in any competition, including the newly established Serbian SuperLiga and Serbian Cup, as well as the UEFA Cup. He returned to Chile to play for Coquimbo Unido ahead of the 2007 season.

In November 2007, Berríos moved to Asia and signed with Malaysia Super League club Perak. He would also play for Chilean clubs Santiago Morning and Unión La Calera, before retiring in 2017.

== International career ==
At international level, Berríos represented Chile at the 2001 South American U-20 Championship, making six appearances in the tournament. The team finished in fourth place and qualified for the 2001 FIFA World Youth Championship, where Berríos appeared in one game and scored a goal to give his team a 1–0 victory over China. However, Chile was eliminated from the group stage.
