= Kenny Arena =

American former soccer defender

Personal information
- Full name: Kenneth Scott Arena
- Date of birth: February 6, 1981 (age 45)
- Place of birth: Charlottesville, Virginia, United States
- Height: 6 ft 2 in (1.88 m)
- Position: Defender

Team information
- Current team: FC Cincinnati (assistant)

College career
Years	Team	Apps	(Gls)
1999–2002	Virginia Cavaliers		

Senior career*
Years	Team	Apps	(Gls)
2003–2004	MetroStars	20	(1)
2005	D.C. United	0	(0)

International career
2000–2001	United States U20	24	(1)

Managerial career
- 2006: Virginia Cavaliers (assistant)
- 2007: George Mason Patriots (assistant)
- 2008–2011: UCLA Bruins (assistant)
- 2012–2013: FIU Panthers
- 2014–2016: LA Galaxy (assistant)
- 2017: United States (assistant)
- 2018–2021: Los Angeles FC (assistant)
- 2022–: FC Cincinnati (assistant)
- * Club domestic league appearances and goals

Kenneth Scott Arena (born February 6, 1981) is an American former soccer defender who is currently an assistant coach for FC Cincinnati. Arena is the son of former New England Revolution and United States coach Bruce Arena.

== Player ==
Arena attended the University of Virginia, playing on the men's soccer team from 1999 to 2002. Arena played for the United States U-20 men's national soccer team at the 2001 FIFA World Youth Championship. On January 17, 2003, the MetroStars selected Arena in the fourth round (32nd overall) in the 2003 MLS SuperDraft. He spent two seasons with the MetroStars before being traded to D.C. United in exchange for a third round selection in the 2005 Supplemental Draft. He played one season with United and was released on December 31, 2005.

== Coach ==
Arena served as a volunteer assistant coach with the University of Virginia for the 2006 season and helped lead the Cavaliers to the NCAA Division I Men's Soccer semifinals. On April 2, 2007, Kenny was hired as an assistant coach at George Mason University where he was responsible for player development, recruiting and scheduling. On February 6, 2008, Arena was hired as an assistant coach by UCLA.

On March 2, 2012, Arena was hired by Florida International to be the head coach of the men's soccer team. He joined his father on the staff of the LA Galaxy for the 2014 season.

== Honors ==
=== Assistant Coach ===
FC Cincinnati

- MLS Supporters' Shield: 2023
