= Ibrahim Abdul Razak =

Ghanaian footballer (born 1983)

Personal information
- Date of birth: 18 April 1983 (age 43)
- Place of birth: Accra, Ghana
- Height: 1.80 m (5 ft 11 in)
- Position: Attacking midfielder

Youth career
- 1998–1999: Mighty Jets

Senior career*
Years	Team	Apps	(Gls)
1999	Liberty Professionals		
1999–2000	AaB	0	(0)
2000–2001	SSD Castelfiorentino	9	(1)
2001–2004	Empoli	3	(0)
2002–2003	→ Saint-Étienne (loan)	25	(2)
2004–2007	Maccabi Netanya	50	(10)
2007	→ Hapoel Ra'anana (loan)	1	(0)
2007–2009	Liberty Professionals		
2009	El-Ittihad	5	(0)
2010–2011	Hapoel Acre	30	(3)
2011	Hapoel Be'er Sheva	11	(0)
2011–2012	Vissai Ninh Bình	23	(0)
2014	FC Imereti Khoni		
2015–2016	Al-Najma		

International career
1999	Ghana U-17	6	(0)
1999–2001	Ghana U-20	7	(1)
2001–2006	Ghana	24	(0)
- * Club domestic league appearances and goals

Ibrahim Abdul Razak or Anglicised: Abdul Razak Ibrahim (born 18 April 1983) is a Ghanaian former professional footballer who played as an attacking midfielder.

== Club career ==
Razak was born in Accra, Ghana. He began playing at the Mighty Jets youth system in 1998. In 2000, he moved to Danish club Aalborg Chang, and in 2001 moved to Italian club Empoli, where he played for one year. The year after he moved to French club Saint-Étienne, where he played for two years on loan before moving back to Empoli.

Razak moved to Maccabi Netanya at the end of 2004 there he spent two successful seasons with 12 goals and 16 assists but after a serious knee injury he went six months without playing and was loaned to Hapoel Ra'anana before he was released by Maccabi Netanya.

After his stint in Israel he got back to Ghana in 2007 to Liberty Professionals and in 2009 he moved to El-Ittihad on a one-and-a-half-year deal for $150,000. In 2010, he went back to Israel signing with Hapoel Acre until the end of the season. In January 2011 he moved to Hapoel Be'er Sheva on a 4.5-year contract.

In the winter of 2011, Razak signed with Vietnamese V-League side Vissai Ninh Bình.

In 2014, he played for FC Imereti Khoni from the Georgian third tier. In July 2015 he signed a one-year contract with Al-Najma from the Bahraini 2nd Division.

== International career ==
Razak also played for the Ghana national team, sent to the 2004 Summer Olympics in Athens.

== Honours ==
Ghana U17

- U17 World Cup: third place 1999

AaB

- Danish Cup: runner-up 1999–2000

Ghana U20

- Youth World Cup: runner-up 2001

Maccabi Netanya

- Toto Cup (Leumit): 2004–05
- Liga Leumit: runner-up 2004–05
