= Márcio (footballer, born December 1981) =

Brazilian footballer

Personal information
- Full name: Márcio Augusto dos Santos Aguiar
- Date of birth: 20 December 1981 (age 44)
- Place of birth: São Paulo, Brazil
- Height: 1.92 m (6 ft 4 in)
- Position: Goalkeeper

Team information
- Current team: São Paulo (goalkeeping coach)

Senior career*
Years	Team	Apps	(Gls)
1999–2004	São Paulo	0	(0)
2004	Paulista	0	(0)
2004–2006	Grêmio	2	(0)
2006–2007	Paysandu	0	(0)
2007–2008	Ituano	0	(0)
2008–2011	Grêmio Barueri	49	(0)
2011–2012	Atlético Paranaense	6	(0)
2012–2013	Botafogo-SP	6	(0)
2013–2014	Grêmio Barueri	3	(0)
2014	XV de Piracicaba	7	(0)
2014–2015	Beira-Mar	15	(0)
2015	Uberlândia	1	(0)
2015	Red Bull Brasil	0	(0)
2016–?	Portuguesa da Ilha		

International career
2001	Brazil U20	1	(0)
- * Club domestic league appearances and goals

Marcio Augusto Aguiar dos Santos (born 20 December 1981), better known as Márcio or Testão, is a Brazilian former professional footballer who played as a goalkeeper.

== Career ==
Marcio began his career at São Paulo in 1999. In 2004, he was loaned to São Paulo. To excel in this club, he was hired, also on loan at Gremio. Despite being relegated to Serie B, continued at the club until the following summer, when it was released. In 2006, it agreed with Paysandu.

The following year he played in Ituano.

And since 2008 the Guild is Prudente (by March 2010, the club was called Barueri).

He moved from Grêmio Prudente to Brazilian Série A side Atlético Paranaense on 14 May 2011.

== Career statistics ==
(Correct as of October 16, 2010)

Club	Season	State League		Brazilian Série A		Copa do Brasil		Copa Libertadores		Copa Sudamericana		Total	
Club	Season	Apps	Goals	Apps	Goals	Apps	Goals	Apps	Goals	Apps	Goals	Apps	Goals
Grêmio Prudente	2009	2	0	4	0	-	-	-	-	-	-	6	0
Grêmio Prudente	2010	20	0	8	0	-	-	-	-	-	-	28	0
Atlético Paranaense	2011			6	0	-	-	-	-	-	-	6	0
Total		22	0	18	0	-	-	-	-	-	-	40	0
