= Florine De Leymarie =

French alpine skier (born 1981)

Florine de Leymarie (born 9 May 1981 in Moûtiers) is a French Alpine skier. She is 1.76 m (5.77 ft) tall and weighs 64 kg (141.10 lb). She participated in the 2006 Olympic Winter Games in Turin. She was named Rookie of the year 2005 alongside David Poisson by the French Ski federation.

== Results ==
=== World Cup ===
- Best overall World Cup position: 53rd in 2005
- Best position in slalom: 18th in 2005
- Best position in a stage of the World Cup: 4th.
