= Patrick Villars =

Ghanaian football player (born 1984)

Personal information
- Full name: Patrick Villars
- Date of birth: 21 May 1984 (age 42)
- Place of birth: Ghana
- Height: 1.80 m (5 ft 11 in)
- Position: Defender

Senior career*
Years	Team	Apps	(Gls)
1999–2001	Ebusua Dwarfs		
2001–2003	Trabzonspor	5	(0)
2003	Bucheon SK	11	(0)
2004–2006	Maccabi Petah Tikva		
2006	→ Beringen-Heusden-Zolder (loan)		
2007	Qingdao Hailifeng		
2009–2012	Küçük Kaymaklı Türk S.K.		
- * Club domestic league appearances and goals

Patrick Villars (born 21 May 1984) is a Ghanaian football player.

== Career ==
Villars has played for the Ebusua Dwarfs, for Turkish club Trabzonspor, in South Korea for Bucheon SK, for Israeli club Maccabi Petah Tikva FC, in Belgium for Beringen-Heusden-Zolder, for Chinese club Qingdao Hailifeng, and in Northern Cyprus for Küçük Kaymaklı Türk S.K.

== International ==
He was part of the Ghanaian 2004 Olympic football team, who exited in the first round, having finished in third place in group B and was member of the Black Satellites team at 2001 FIFA World Youth Championship in Argentina.

== Honors and awards ==
- FIFA World Youth Championship runner-up: 2001
- National cup- 40
- African Youth Championship]runner-up:2001
