= Ariel Seltzer =

Argentine footballer

Personal information
- Full name: Ariel Gerardo Seltzer
- Date of birth: 3 January 1981 (age 45)
- Place of birth: Ituzaingó, Argentina
- Height: 1.66 m (5 ft 5 in)
- Position: Defender

Youth career
- Argentinos Juniors

Senior career*
Years	Team	Apps	(Gls)
2000–2008	Argentinos Juniors	126	(1)
2008–2010	Independiente Rivadavia	31	(0)
2011–2013	Juventud Unida Universitario	?	(?)
2013	Unión Mar del Plata	53	(1)

International career
2001	Argentina U20	5	(0)
- * Club domestic league appearances and goals as of 20 May 2015

Ariel Gerardo "Alka" Seltzer (born 3 January 1981) is a former Argentine football defender. He won the 2001 FIFA World Youth Championship on home soil with Argentina.

In 2006, Beitar Jerusalem claimed Seltzer's grandfather was Jewish and requested Argentinos Juniors for a transfer so he could get Israeli citizenship through the Law of Return. However, he was later found ineligible for emigration and Beitar rescinded their offer.
