= Mathieu Maton =

French footballer (born 1981)

Personal information
- Full name: Mathieu Maton
- Date of birth: 19 January 1981 (age 45)
- Place of birth: Marcq-en-Barœul, France
- Height: 1.80 m (5 ft 11 in)
- Position: Striker

Youth career
- 1989–2004: Lille

Senior career*
Years	Team	Apps	(Gls)
1999–2004	Lille	0	(0)
2001–2002	→ Châteauroux (loan))	3	(0)
2003	→ Cannes	3	(1)
2004–2005	La Louvière	16	(3)
2005–2006	ES Wasquehal		
2006–2007	Union Saint-Gilloise		
2007–2008	Saint-Denis		
2008–2013	US Marquette-Lez-Lille		

International career
1999–2001	France U-21	6	(1)
- * Club domestic league appearances and goals

Mathieu Maton (born 19 January 1981) is a retired French footballer who played as a striker.

== Career ==
He was part of France squad at 2001 FIFA World Youth Championship.
