= Yohan Hautcœur =

French footballer (born 1981)

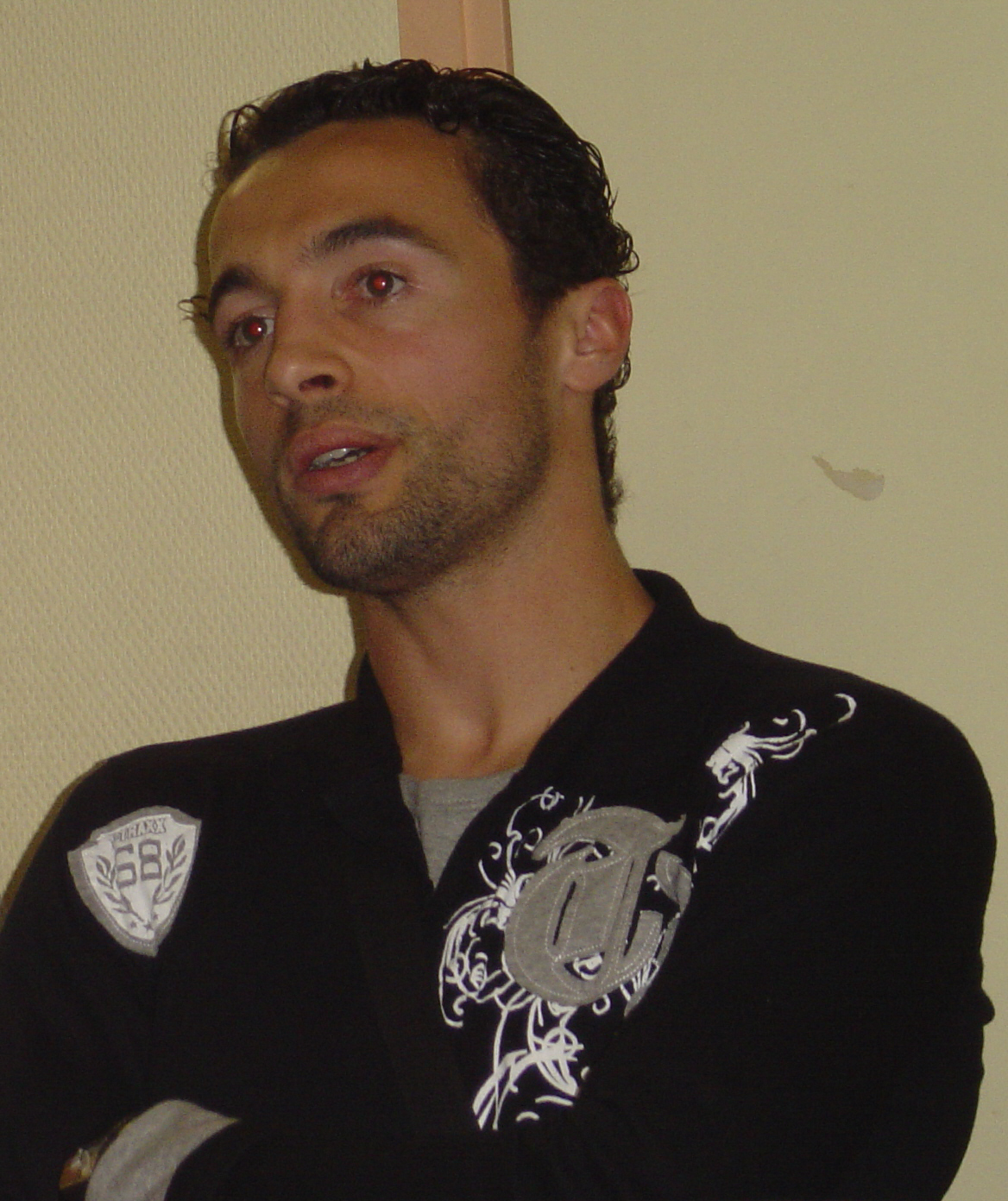
- Hautcœur in the 2006–07 season

Personal information
- Date of birth: 30 October 1981 (age 45)
- Place of birth: Nantes, France
- Height: 1.77 m (5 ft 10 in)
- Position: Midfielder

Youth career
- La Roche Vendée
- Le Mans

Senior career*
Years	Team	Apps	(Gls)
1998–2006	Le Mans	151	(7)
2006–2010	Saint-Étienne	49	(1)
2007–2008	→ Lorient (loan)	33	(0)
2011	Le Mans	5	(0)
2011–2013	Châteauroux	54	(0)
2013–2015	Amiens	43	(3)
- * Club domestic league appearances and goals

Yohan Hautcœur (born 30 October 1981) is a French former professional footballer who played as a midfielder.

Having played for Le Mans, Lorient and Saint-Étienne in Ligue 1, (Note: Yohan Hautcœur – French league stats at LFP – also available in French (archived)) he has also represented Châteauroux and Amiens.
