= Esteban Herrera =

Argentine footballer

Personal information
- Full name: Estebán José Maria Herrera
- Date of birth: March 9, 1981 (age 45)
- Place of birth: Villa Constitucion, Argentina
- Height: 1.78 m (5 ft 10 in)
- Position: Forward

Youth career
- Boca Juniors

Senior career*
| Years | Team | Apps | (Gls) |
| 1998–2002 | Boca Juniors | 8 | (1) |
| 2001–2002 | → Talleres (loan) | 11 | (0) |
| 2002–2003 | Messina Peloro | 7 | (0) |
| 2003–2004 | Lucchese | 4 | (0) |
| 2004–2005 | Chacarita Juniors | 38 | (7) |
| 2005–2007 | Iraklis | 59 | (10) |
| 2007–2008 | Veria | 23 | (2) |
| 2008–2009 | OFI | 9 | (0) |
| 2009 | Coronel Bolognesi | 9 | (4) |
| 2010 | Sportivo Italiano | 12 | (4) |
| 2011 | Ñublense | 8 | (1) |
| 2011–2012 | Camioneros | | |
| 2012–2013 | Mitra Kukar | 37 | (15) |
| 2014 | Camioneros | 7 | (2) |
| 2015 | Deportivo Laferrere | 2 | (0) |
| Total | | 234 | (46) |

International career
| 2001 | Argentina U20 | 7 | (3) |
- * Club domestic league appearances and goals

Estebán José Maria Herrera is an Argentine former footballer who played as a forward.

== Career ==
Herrera started his career at Boca Juniors in the Primera Division Argentina. It was with Boca that he won his first and second major titles as a player. He was part of the squad that won the Clausura 1999 title and in 2001 he helped Boca to win the Copa Libertadores title.

In 2001 Herrera was part of the Argentina Under-20 team that won the 2001 FIFA World Youth Championship.

At the end of the 2001 season Herrera left Boca for Talleres de Córdoba but after only one season with the club he moved to Italy to play for Messina Peloro.

Between 2005 and 2007, Herrera played as a forward for Iraklis F.C., a first-division club based in Thessaloniki, Greece.

In 2011, Herrera had a brief stint with Ñublense in the Chilean Primera División.

== Honours ==
=== Club honors ===
Boca Juniors

- Argentine Primera División (1): Clausura 1999
- Copa Libertadores (1): 2001

=== Country honors ===
Argentina U-20

- FIFA World Youth Championship (1): 2001
