= Wael Riad =

Egyptian footballer (born 1982)

Personal information
- Full name: Wael Riad
- Date of birth: 2 August 1982 (age 44)
- Place of birth: Giza, Egypt
- Height: 1.69 m (5 ft 7 in)
- Position: Attacking midfielder

Youth career
- El-Ahly

Senior career*
| Years | Team | Apps | (Gls) |
| 2001–2009 | El-Ahly | ? | (?) |
| 2007 | → Grazer AK (loan) | 5 | (0) |
| 2007–2008 | → Haras El Hodood (loan) | 3 | (1) |
| 2008–2009 | Itesalat | ?? | (5) |
| 2009 | El Gouna | 0 | (0) |
- * Club domestic league appearances and goals as of 14 December 2008 ‡ National team caps and goals as of 1 July 2006

Wael Riad (Arabic: وائل رياض) (born 2 August 1982) is a former Egyptian footballer. He player in the attacking midfielder position.

== Club career ==
=== Loan to Grazer AK ===
Riad transferred to Grazer AK on loan in January 2007. He participated in two friendly matches in February, scoring a goal in each game. Cheetos played 5 matches with Grazer AK's first team between February and April 2007, starting once and scoring no goals.

== International career ==
=== National Youth team ===
Wael Riad was a regular player in Egypt's Youth team who were bronze medalists at the 2001 FIFA World Youth Championship in Argentina. He scored against Finland in the group stage and again in the win against the United States in the last 16.
