= Mohamed El Yamani =

Egyptian footballer (born 1982)

Mohamed El Yamani bis
Personal information
- Full name: Mohamed El Yamani
- Date of birth: 10 January 1982 (age 44)
- Place of birth: Ismaïlia, Egypt
- Height: 1.89 m (6 ft 2 1/2 in)
- Position: Striker

Youth career
- Ismaily

Senior career*
Years	Team	Apps	(Gls)
1998–2004	Standard Liège	?	(?)
2003–2004	→ K.V Mechelen (loan)	?	(?)
2004–2005	Zamalek SC	?	(?)
2005–2006	Ismaily	??	(?)
2006–2009	Ittehad Alexandria	?	(?)
2009–2010	El Shams	?	(?)
2010–2011	Floriana FC	?	(?)

International career^{‡}
? (?)	Egypt	2	(1)
	Egypt U20	54	(17)
- * Club domestic league appearances and goals as of December 14, 2008 ‡ National team caps and goals as of 1 July 2006

Mohamed El Yamani (Arabic: محمد اليماني) (born January 1, 1982) is an Egyptian footballer. He plays as a striker.

== Club career ==
=== Standard Liège ===
At Standard Liège, El Yamani impressed, and his club thought they would cash in on him when he excelled at the 2001 FIFA World Youth Championship in Argentina. He was very close from Italian giants Juventus, but a dramatic car accident in Cairo set back this move. In July 2001, when El Yamani was on his way to the airport, he lost control of his car after bursting a tyre. In addition to this offer from Juventus, another one from Bayern Munich did not materialize.

In August 2002, El Yamani was listed for loan, and although Alemannia Aachen announced that it had acquired his services, he remained at Standard Liège. Eventually, KV Mechelen signed El Yamani on loan at the start of 2003.

=== Loan to KV Mechelen ===
Despite poor performances from his team, El Yamani, who wore number nine, was impressive.

Upon returning to Standard Liège at the start of 2003–2004 season, he had a superb pre-season, and featured heavily for his club in the following months.

=== Return to Egypt ===
In May 2004, El Yamani decided to return to Egypt, signing for giants Zamalek SC.

=== Back to Europe ===
In January 2011 he was close to signing for Finnish club Kuopion Palloseura but instead decided to join Maltese club Floriana FC. He could help the Maltese team finish 2nd in the league and gain silverware for the first time in 17 years as the team was crowned Maltese Cup winners qualifying to UEFA Europa League.

=== International career ===
El Yamani has played two matches for Egypt's first team, scoring one goal.

== International goals ==
Egypt's score first.

#	Date	Location	Opponent	Score	Result	Competition
1.	25 November 2002	Abuja, Nigeria	Nigeria	1–0	1–1	Friendly

=== National Youth team ===
El Yamani was a regular player in Egypt's Youth team who got the bronze medal in the 2001 FIFA World Youth Championship, as Yamani scored 4 goals against Argentina, U.S.A, Netherlands and, Paraguay. His goal against Paraguay was the most valuable among the four as it earned the bronze medal for Egypt.

== Honours ==
=== National team ===
- Bronze Medalist at FIFA World Youth Championship 2001
- Silver Boot at FIFA World Youth Championship 2001

=== Standard ===
- Gold Medalist at Belgian Cup

=== Floriana FC ===
- Gold Medalist at Maltese Cup 2010–2011
- Silver Medalist at Maltese Premier League
