= Sébastien Duthier =

French footballer (born 1981)

Personal information
- Full name: Sébastien Duthier
- Date of birth: January 5, 1981 (age 45)
- Place of birth: Limoges, France
- Height: 1.90 m (6 ft 3 in)
- Position: Defender

Senior career*
Years	Team	Apps	(Gls)
2005–2006	Clermont-Ferrand		
2006–2007	Cannes		
2007–2011	Cournon		
2011–	Chamalières		
- * Club domestic league appearances and goals as of January 6, 2007

Sébastien Duthier (born January 1981) was a Professional Football player. He played with Cannes in 2006 but he had no caps cause of disagreements with AS Cannes's coach.
