= Luis Oyarzún (footballer) =

Chilean footballer (born 1982)

Personal information
- Full name: Luis Esteban Oyarzún Rebolledo
- Date of birth: 24 April 1982 (age 44)
- Place of birth: San Miguel, Santiago, Chile
- Height: 1.81 m (5 ft 11 in)
- Position: Defender

Youth career
- Palestino

Senior career*
Years	Team	Apps	(Gls)
2001–2003	Palestino	85	(12)
2003–2006	Santiago Wanderers	5	(0)
2007	O'Higgins	20	(0)
2007	Coquimbo Unido	7	(0)
2008	Deportes Melipilla	14	(3)
2009–2011	Palestino	69	(2)
2012	Rangers	9	(1)
2012	Rangers B	1	(0)
2013	Palestino	0	(0)

International career
2001	Chile U20	2	(0)
2003–2004	Chile U23		
- * Club domestic league appearances and goals

Luis Esteban Oyarzún Rebolledo (born 24 April 1982) is a Chilean former professional footballer who played as a defender for several teams in the Chilean Primera División. He both started and finished his professional career with Palestino.

== International career ==
Oyarzún represented Chile at under-20 level in the 2001 FIFA World Youth Championship.

At under-23 level, he represented Chile since 2003 and took part in the 2004 Pre-Olympic Tournament.
