= Vincent Bernardet =

French football (born 1981)

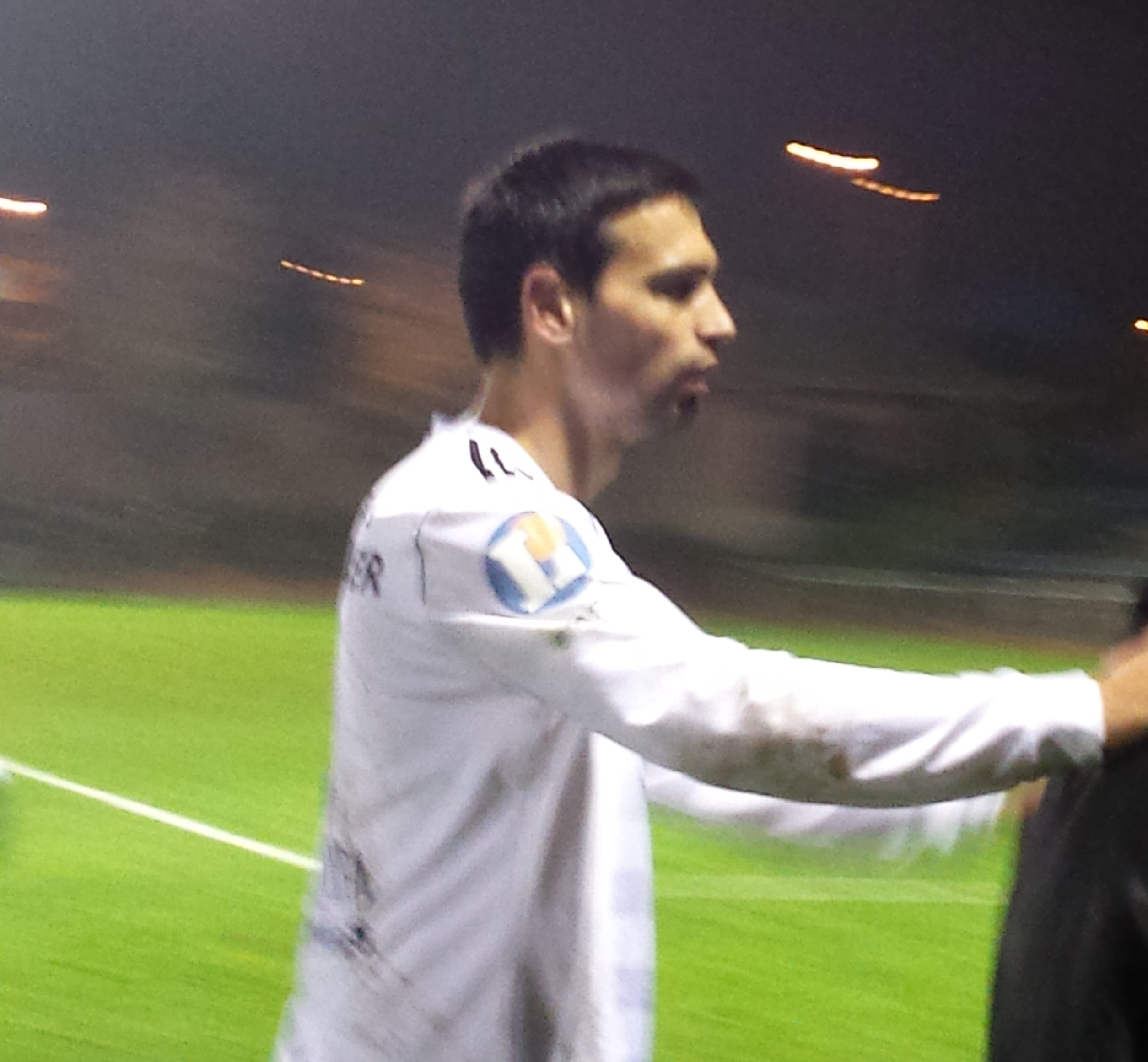
- Bernardet with Romorantin in 2014

Personal information
- Date of birth: 23 April 1981 (age 45)
- Place of birth: Châteauroux, France
- Height: 1.81 m (5 ft 11 in)
- Position: Left-back

Senior career*
| Years | Team | Apps | (Gls) |
| 2001–2002 | Châteauroux | 1 | (0) |
| 2002–2005 | Laval | 84 | (3) |
| 2005–2006 | Brest | 15 | (0) |
| 2006–2008 | Gueugnon | 40 | (1) |
| 2008–2009 | Bellinzona | 13 | (0) |
| 2009–2010 | Bourges | | |
| 2010–2011 | Beauvais | 33 | (2) |
| 2011–2013 | Colmar | 61 | (2) |
| 2012–2013 | Colmar II | 9 | (1) |
| 2013–2014 | Biesheim | 25 | (9) |
| 2014–2018 | Romorantin | 110 | (1) |
| 2020–2022 | FC Déolois | 14 | (2) |
| Total | | 385 | (21) |
- * Club domestic league appearances and goals

Vincent Bernardet (born 23 April 1981) is a French former professional footballer who played as a left-back.

== Career ==
Bernardet has made 140 appearances in Ligue 2 and played in the 2008–09 UEFA Cup first round with Swiss side AC Bellinzona.

Bernardet retired at the end of the 2021–22 season.
