= Patrik Kolář =

Czech footballer (born 1981)

Personal information
- Date of birth: 30 October 1981 (age 45)
- Place of birth: Czechoslovakia
- Height: 1.85 m (6 ft 1 in)
- Position: Goalkeeper

Senior career*
Years	Team	Apps	(Gls)
2002–2003	České Budějovice	8	(0)
2003–2007	Teplice	8	(0)

International career
2002–2003	Czech Republic U21	4	(0)
- * Club domestic league appearances and goals

Patrik Kolář (born 30 October 1981) is a retired Czech football goalkeeper. He played in the Czech First League for České Budějovice and Teplice, playing a total of four seasons in the top flight. He also played in the 2003–04 UEFA Cup, keeping goal for Teplice in both matches in the second round against Feyenoord, over the course of which he conceded only one goal and Teplice went through to the next round 3–1 on aggregate.

Kolář played international football at under-21 level for Czech Republic U21.
