= Sébastien Grégori =

French footballer (born 1981)

Personal information
- Date of birth: 6 April 1981 (age 45)
- Place of birth: Marseille, France
- Height: 1.77 m (5 ft 10 in)
- Position: Midfielder

Team information
- Current team: AS Cannes
- Number: 7

Youth career
- Olympique de Marseille

Senior career*
| Years | Team | Apps | (Gls) |
| 1998–2003 | Olympique de Marseille | 0 | (0) |
| 2003–2007 | US Créteil-Lusitanos | 116 | (0) |
| 2008 | FC Gueugnon | 15 | (0) |
| 2008–2010 | AC Ajaccio | 36 | (1) |
| 2010– | AS Cannes | 1 | (0) |
- * Club domestic league appearances and goals as of 08:28, 12 August 2010 (UTC)

Sébastien Grégori (born 6 April 1981) is a French football midfielder who currently plays for AS Cannes.
