= Walter Fretes =

Paraguayan footballer (born 1982)

Personal information
- Full name: Walter Milciades Fretes
- Date of birth: 18 May 1982 (age 44)
- Place of birth: Paraguay
- Height: 1.79 m (5 ft 10 in)
- Position: Midfielder

Team information
- Current team: Universitario de Deportes

Youth career
- Cerro Porteño

Senior career*
Years	Team	Apps	(Gls)
2000–2006	Cerro Porteño	141	(15)
2006–2007	Jaguares	13	(0)
2007–2008	Cerro Porteño	15	(6)
2008	Newell's Old Boys	1	(0)
2009	Cerro Porteño	2	(0)
2009–2010	Sportivo Luqueño	6	(1)
2010–2011	U. San Martín de Porres	26	(4)
2012	Universitario de Deportes	0	(0)
2012–2014	Deportivo Capiatá	0	(0)

International career^{‡}
2006	Paraguay	1	(0)
- * Club domestic league appearances and goals as of 20 December 2008 ‡ National team caps and goals as of 8 September 2008

Walter Milciades Fretes (born 18 May 1982) is a Paraguayan football player that usually plays as a right midfielder for Universitario de Deportes.

During his career he played for teams like Cerro Porteño, Chiapas of Mexico and Newell's Old Boys of Argentina.
