= Emmanuel Kwasi Afranie =

Ghanaian football coach (1943–2016)

Personal information
- Date of birth: 24 December 1943
- Date of death: 9 November 2016 (aged 72)
- Place of death: Suhum, Ghana

Managerial career
- Years: Team
- 1984: Ghana
- 1997: Hearts of Oak
- 1998–1999: Ghana (women)
- 2002–2003: Ghana
- 2005–2006: Asante Kotoko

Emmanuel Kwasi Afranie (24 December 1943 – 9 November 2016) was a Ghanaian football coach who managed Hearts of Oak, Asante Kotoko and the national team.
