= Petr Musil =

Czech footballer

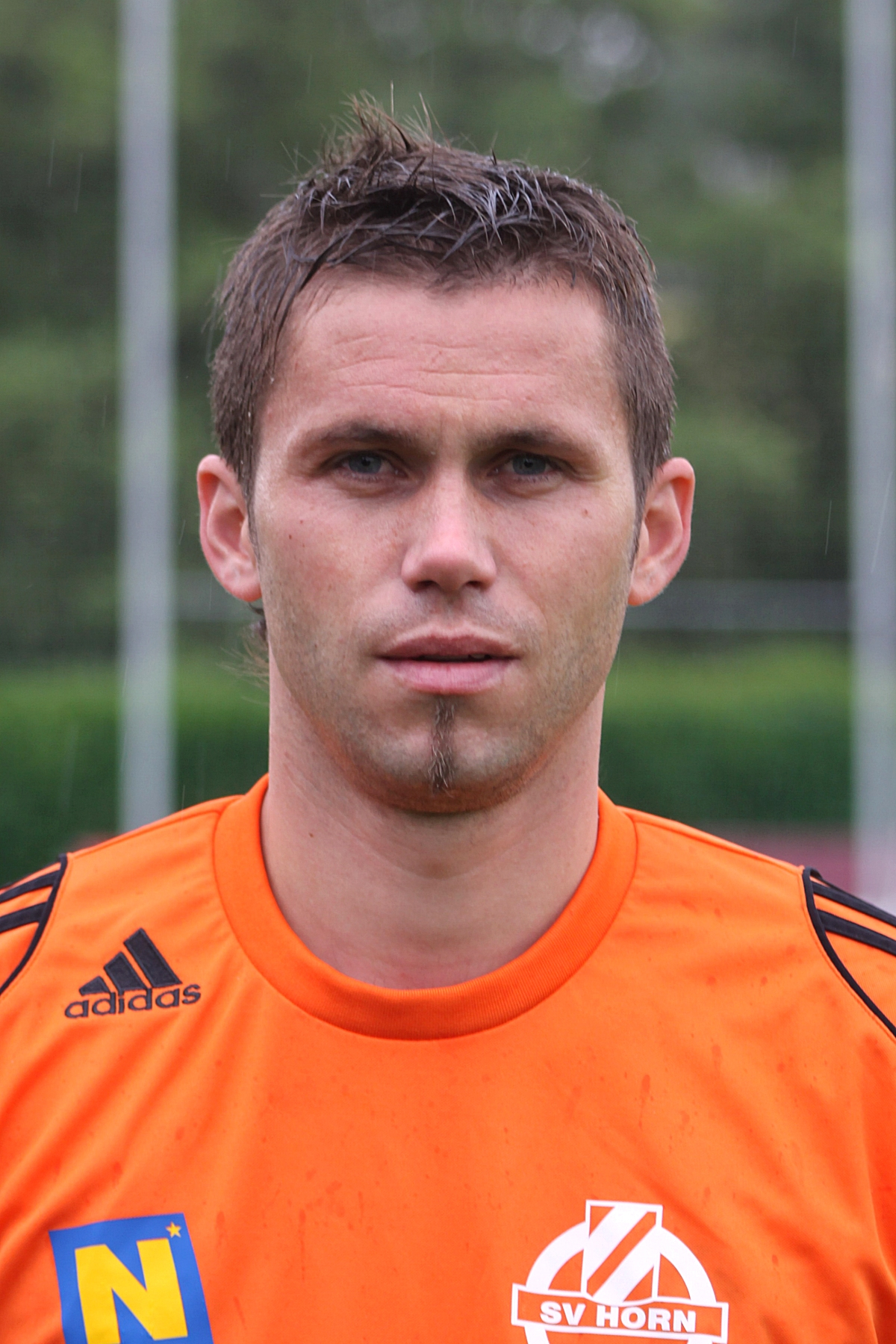

Personal information
- Date of birth: 23 September 1981 (age 45)
- Place of birth: Czechoslovakia
- Height: 1.74 m (5 ft 9 in)
- Position: Midfielder

Senior career*
Years	Team	Apps	(Gls)
2000–2008	1.FC Brno	109	(4)
2006	→ FK Jablonec (loan)	6	(0)
2006	→ FK Inter Bratislava (loan)	19	(4)
2008–2009	FC Zlín	31	(0)

International career
2001–2002	Czech Republic U20	10	(2)
2002–2003	Czech Republic U21	14	(0)
- * Club domestic league appearances and goals

Petr Musil (born 23 September 1981) is a Czech football midfielder. He made over 100 appearances in the Gambrinus liga. He also played international football at under-21 level for Czech Republic U21.
