= Jorge Vargas (footballer, born 1981) =

Ecuadorian footballer

Personal information
- Full name: Jorge Alberto Vargas Oyola
- Date of birth: January 30, 1981 (age 45)
- Place of birth: Santa Rosa, El Oro
- Position: Defender

Team information
- Current team: Canteras del Jubones

Senior career*
Years	Team	Apps	(Gls)
2000–2002	LDU Quito	14	(0)
2002	LDU Loja	12	(2)
2003	Aucas	20	(1)
2004	Audaz Octubrino	23	(1)
2005	LDU Loja	29	(0)
2006	Aucas	8	(0)
2006	Delfín	7	(1)
2007	Deportivo Azogues	1	(0)
2007–2008	Santa Rosa FC	20	(6)
2008	Grecia	15	(2)
2009	Atlético Audaz	16	(1)
2010	Municipal Cañar	36	(7)
2011	LDU Portoviejo	24	(6)
2012	Santa Rosa FC	2	(2)
2012	Deportivo Azogues	32	(4)
2013	C.D. Olmedo	13	(0)
2014	Orense SC	8	(2)
2015	Audaz Octubrino	7	(1)
2017–	Canteras del Jubones	4	(1)

International career
2001	Ecuador U-20	3	(1)
- * Club domestic league appearances and goals as of July 9, 2017

Jorge Alberto Vargas Oyola (born 30 January 1981 in Santa Rosa, El Oro) is an Ecuadorian football player. He currently plays for Deportivo Azogues.
