= Salah Al-Deen Siamand =

Iraqi footballer

Personal information
- Full name: Salah Al-Deen Siamand Tahir
- Date of birth: 13 July 1981 (age 45)
- Place of birth: Iraq
- Positions: Defender; full back

Senior career*
Years	Team	Apps	(Gls)
2000–2003	Erbil		
2003–2004	Al-Zawraa		
2004–2010	Erbil		

International career
2001–2002	Iraq		
- * Club domestic league appearances and goals

Salah Al-Deen Siamand Tahir (Arabic: صلاح الدين سيامند طاهر) (born 13 July 1981) is a former Iraqi football player of Kurdish ethnicity, who last played for Erbil.

Salah Al-Deen played in both central defence and in a deep midfield position.

He played for the Iraq B team in Indonesia in 2000, before winning the 2000 AFC Youth Championship in Tehran, Iran, three months later. In the early games of that tournament, Saimand was never a regular, making only one substitute appearance before he was introduced at half-time against Korea; Iraq eliminated Korea and advanced to the semi-final. The Iraqi team manager kept the same formation for the semi-final match against Iran, giving Siamand his first start; he missed a penalty in the shoot-out win.

After the final win over Japan in the final, he was given an unexpected call up to the Iraqi national team by Milan Živadinović, making his debut on January 31, 2000, in a 0–0 draw with Lebanon in Beirut.
