= Thorsten Burkhardt =

German footballer

Personal information
- Date of birth: 21 May 1981 (age 45)
- Place of birth: Bonn, West Germany
- Height: 1.86 m (6 ft 1 in)
- Position: Midfielder

Youth career
- 1989–1996: TuRa Hennef
- 1996–1997: Siegburger SV
- 1997–1999: FV Bad Honnef

Senior career*
Years	Team	Apps	(Gls)
1999–2002	Bayer 04 Leverkusen II	65	(16)
2001–2002	Bayer 04 Leverkusen	0	(0)
2002–2005	SpVgg Greuther Fürth	76	(6)
2005–2007	SV Wacker Burghausen	63	(10)
2007–2009	SpVgg Greuther Fürth	51	(5)
2009–2011	Alemannia Aachen	25	(1)
2011–2013	SV Wehen Wiesbaden	9	(1)
2013–2014	SV Wacker Burghausen	48	(3)

International career
2003–2004	Germany U-21	4	(0)
- * Club domestic league appearances and goals

Thorsten Burkhardt (born 21 May 1981 in Bonn) is a German footballer.
