= Robert (footballer, born 1981) =

Brazilian footballer

Personal information
- Full name: Robert de Pinho de Souza
- Date of birth: 27 February 1981 (age 45)
- Place of birth: Salvador, Brazil
- Height: 1.86 m (6 ft 1 in)
- Position: Striker

Senior career*
Years	Team	Apps	(Gls)
1999–2000	Coritiba	34	(11)
2000–2001	Botafogo-SP	7	(7)
2001–2002	Servette	19	(8)
2002	São Caetano	12	(3)
2003	→ Spartak Moscow (loan)	12	(3)
2003	→ Kawasaki Frontale (loan)	16	(6)
2004–2005	Atlas	44	(33)
2005–2006	PSV	15	(7)
2006–2007	→ Betis (loan)	48	(16)
2007	Betis	33	(5)
2007	Al-Ittihad Jeddah	19	(9)
2008–2010	Monterrey	16	(12)
2008	→ Tecos (loan)	19	(5)
2009	→ América (loan)	17	(4)
2009–2010	→ Palmeiras (loan)	35	(19)
2010	→ Cruzeiro (loan)	14	(3)
2011	→ Bahia (loan)	12	(4)
2011	→ Puebla (loan)	3	(4)
2012	Jeju United	13	(3)
2012	Ceará	16	(5)
2013	Necaxa	12	(11)
2013	Boa Esporte	3	(2)
2013–2014	Fortaleza	22	(10)
2015	Sampaio Corrêa	8	(1)
2015	Vitória	11	(2)
2016	Paraná	10	(3)
2016	Gżira United	6	(1)
2017	Oeste	26	(6)
2018	Audax	13	(2)
2018	Santa Cruz	6	(6)
2018	Portuguesa	6	(1)

International career
2001–2002	Brazil U20	12	(?)
2003	Brazil U23	4	(2)
- * Club domestic league appearances and goals

Robert de Pinho de Souza (born 27 February 1981), simply known as Robert, is a Brazilian former footballer who played for as a striker.

== Club career ==
=== Early career ===
Born in Salvador, Robert began his professional career with Botafogo de Ribeirão Preto of Brazil, where he played in 2001. He made a move to São Caetano in 2002. On 14 March 2003, Robert signed for Spartak Moscow on loan until the end of the 2003 season. After less than a season with Spartak, however, he returned to the Americas, signing with Club Atlas. He did well in his first season with Atlas, scoring 16 goals in 21 games during the 2004 Clausura. He repeated his performance in the 2004 Apertura, leading them to the semifinals of the liguilla, where they were eliminated by UNAM Pumas.

=== PSV Eindhoven ===
Robert moved from Atlas to PSV Eindhoven for £2 million, in January 2005. He made 32 league appearances, scoring 7 goals. During the UEFA Champions League quarter-final match against Olympique Lyonnais, he delivered his decisive spot-kick which sent his team into a semi-final showdown with eventual losing finalist AC Milan. Although he hardly had the time to impress in the Champions League games, he played an excellent match against the Italian giants in the return leg at Philips Stadion, with PSV winning 3–1 and being ousted on away goals, and he himself came close to scoring when he cracked a long range shot which just missed the Milan left post.

=== Real Betis ===
Robert was loaned by PSV to Real Betis for 1 1/2 years for €1 million fee, arriving during the 2006 January transfer window. His signing was pivotal in the efforts of Betis to avoid relegation, scoring 7 La Liga goals, including two against Villarreal in a 2–1 win at El Madrigal and a winning penalty against bitter rivals Sevilla FC in a 2–1 win at the Manuel Ruiz de Lopera. Robert also scored one UEFA Cup goal against AZ Alkmaar. Due to the injury of fellow Brazilian and teammate Ricardo Oliveira, Robert's importance to Betis gradually grew, as he finished the club's top goalscorer for the season. His second season, however, was poorer (still managed 9 league goals in 29 appearances) and he eventually left Real Betis in July 2007, despite Betis excised the option to buy Robert from PSV for €3.25 million on 4 April (effective on 1 July). Moreover, Robert refused to sign a contract, making the transfer collapsed. He joined Al-Ittihad as a free agent. The Court of Arbitration for Sport ruled that despite the collapse of the transfer, Betis still had to pay €1,562,500 as compensation to PSV.

=== CF Monterrey ===
On 22 August 2007, Robert signed for Saudi Arabian team Al-Ittihad. On 4 December 2007 Mexican media announced the transfer of Robert to the Mexican football club CF Monterrey, where he was paired up in attack with Chilean goalscorer Humberto "Chupete" Suazo.

=== Tecos UAG ===
In Tecos, he had mild success and ended the tournament with 5 goals. Tecos were eliminated in the quarterfinals and Robert de Pinho was sent to Club America.

=== Palmeiras ===
In July 2009, Robert joined Palmeiras and in the Série A he scored 5 goals in 12 matches coming as a substitute in all of them. In 2009, he played a good role as a substitute in the league becoming an important player in the squad. In 2010 Robert remained with Palmeiras and became the key striker in the team. On 21 February 2010, he scored two headed goals against Paulista rival São Paulo and Palmeiras won the match by 2–0; it was a great appearance for Robert after he had been criticised in the beginning of the Campeonato Paulista, where he scored already 5 goals. On 14 March 2010, Robert completed perfect hat-trick against Santos and Palmeiras won the match by 4–3; this game was marked by the different type of commemoration after goals. By the end of this game, Robert came to be known as "Blade do Palestra" due to his resemblance to actor Wesley Snipes, who played the character Blade in a trilogy of films.

=== Cruzeiro ===
On 3 June 2010, Cruzeiro Belo Horizonte signed the striker of Palmeiras property, but he arrived on a six-month-loan from CF Monterrey.

=== Puebla ===
It was announced on 8 June 2011 that de Pinho was signed to Puebla. This was made public during the "2011 Super Summer Draft" held in Cancun.

=== Jeju United ===
On 16 January 2011, Robert joined South Korean K-League side Jeju United.
