= Hervé Bugnet =

French footballer (born 1981)

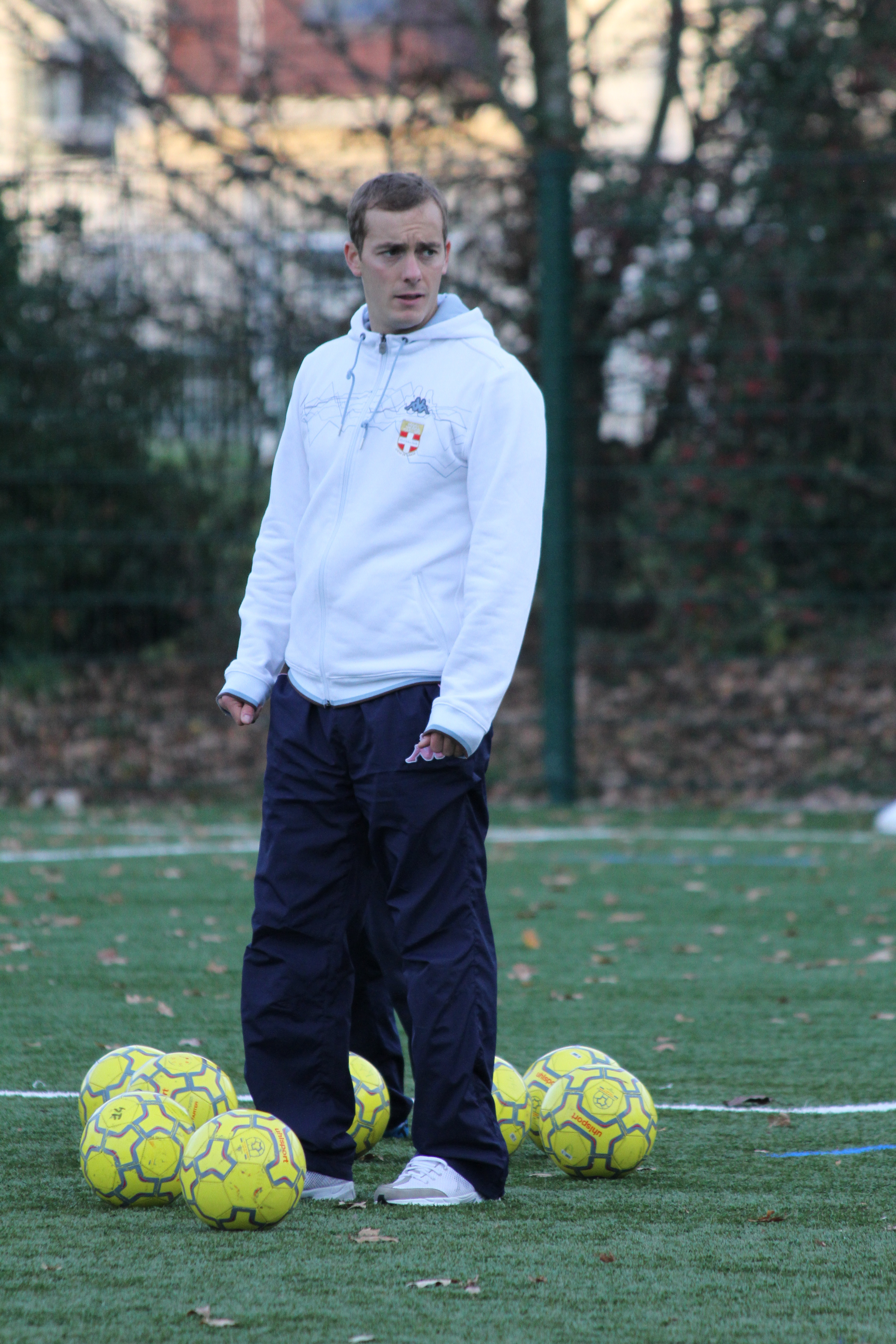

Personal information
- Full name: Hervé Bugnet
- Date of birth: 24 August 1981 (age 45)
- Place of birth: Sainte-Foy-la-Grande, France
- Height: 1.83 m (6 ft 0 in)
- Position: Striker

Youth career
- 1992–2000: Bordeaux

Senior career*
| Years | Team | Apps | (Gls) |
| 2000–2004 | Bordeaux | 15 | (0) |
| 2001–2002 | → Martigues (loan) | 30 | (9) |
| 2002–2003 | → Châteauroux (loan) | 33 | (10) |
| 2003–2004 | → Le Havre (loan) | 33 | (13) |
| 2005–2006 | Montpellier | 49 | (12) |
| 2006–2007 | Dijon | 27 | (3) |
| 2007 | Lucena | 0 | (0) |
| 2007–2008 | Niort | 11 | (1) |
| 2008–2013 | Évian | 37 | (4) |
| 2011 | → Cannes (loan) | 3 | (0) |
| 2013–2015 | Stade Bordelais | 26 | (5) |
| Total | | 264 | (55) |

International career
| 2002–2003 | France U21 | 4 | (0) |
- * Club domestic league appearances and goals

Hervé Bugnet (born 24 August 1981) is a retired right-footed French footballer who played as a striker for Stade Bordelais. He was born in Sainte-Foy-la-Grande, starting his football career with Bordeaux in the year 2000.
