= 1979 in France =

- Decades: 1950s; 1960s; 1970s; 1980s; 1990s
- See also: History of France; Timeline of French history; List of years in France

Events from the year 1979 in France.

== Incumbents ==
- President: Valéry Giscard d'Estaing
- Prime Minister: Raymond Barre

== Events ==
- 1 January – Peugeot completes its takeover of Chrysler Europe, which includes the Simca factories in France and the former Rootes Group factories in Britain. The deal was agreed eight months ago. It is unclear whether the Chrysler brand on British market models will be replaced by Simca branding, or whether a new or different brand within the combine will replace it.
- 8 January – French tanker Betelgeuse explodes at the Gulf Oil terminal at Bantry in Ireland; 50 are killed.
- February – Peugeot becomes the first carmaker to offer a turbo-diesel engine, fitting the engine to their range-topping 604 saloon. The Simca Horizon is European Car of the Year for 1979.
- 18 March – Cantonales elections held.
- 25 March – Cantonales elections held.
- 6 – 8 April – Metz Congress of the French Socialist Party.
- May – Launch of the Peugeot 505, a large rear-wheel drive family saloon which will eventually replace the 504.
- 9 July – A car bomb destroys a Renault owned by "Nazi hunters" Serge and Beate Klarsfeld at their home in France. A note purportedly from ODESSA claims responsibility.
- 1 August – End of the Simca marque after 45 years; from now on, all former Simca and Chrysler cars will be sold as Talbots, following the takeover of Chrysler Europe by Peugeot last year.
- 20 September – French paratroopers help David Dacko to overthrow Bokassa in the Central African Republic.
- 16 October – A tsunami in Nice kills 23 people.
- 2 November – French police shoot dead gangster Jacques Mesrine in Paris.

== Sport ==
- 14 January – the first running of the Paris–Dakar Rally is won by Alain Génestier, Joseph Terbiaut, and Cyril Neveu
- 27 June – Tour de France begins.
- 22 July – Tour de France ends, won by Bernard Hinault.
- 6 – 9 December – World Judo Championships held in Paris.

== Births ==
=== January to March ===
- 4 January – Tristan Gommendy, racing driver
- 7 January – Christophe Guénot, wrestler and Olympic medallist.
- 12 January – Laurent Gagnier, footballer.
- 13 January – Julien Baudet, footballer.
- 17 January – Grégory Carmona, footballer.
- 20 January – Jérôme Thomas, boxer.
- 21 January – Élodie Navarre, actress.
- 22 January – Stéphane Noro, footballer.
- 1 February – Anne-Sophie Mondière, judoka.
- 2 February – Virginie Lagoutte, golfer.
- 7 February – Nicolas Dieuze, footballer.
- 8 February – Lionel Cappone, footballer.
- 14 February:
  - Cédric Fauré, footballer.
  - Audrey Dana, actress.
- 16 February – Stéphane Dalmat, footballer.
- 28 February – Sébastien Bourdais, motor racing driver.
- 2 March – Damien Gregorini, footballer.
- 6 March – Arnaud Maire, footballer.
- 10 March – Laurent Quievreux, footballer.
- 14 March:
  - Nicolas Anelka, international footballer.
  - Emmanuel Duchemin, footballer.
- 15 March – Anthony Deroin, footballer.
- 20 March:
  - Christophe Lemaire, jockey.
  - Sébastien Mazure, footballer.
  - Patrice Quarteron, kickboxer and martial artist.
- 21 March – Cyril Chapuis, footballer.
- 22 March – Benoît Lecouls, rugby union player.
- 24 March – Philippe Gardent, rugby league player.
- 25 March – Pierre Planus, footballer.
- 31 March – Matthieu Bochu, footballer.

=== April to June ===
- 2 April:
  - Salim Kéchiouche, actor.
  - Frédéric Lecanu, judoka.
- 4 April – Ludovic Roux, Nordic combined skier.
- 9 April – Olivier Sorlin, soccer player.
- 14 April:
  - Guillaume Beuzelin, soccer player.
  - Noé Pamarot, soccer player.
- 21 April – Édouard Fillias, classical-liberal activist.
- 23 April:
  - François Gonon, orienteering competitor.
  - Nicolas Portal, cyclist.
- 4 May – Marie Poissonnier, pole vaulter.
- 9 May – Éric Cubilier, soccer player.
- 13 May – Sid Ahmed Rezala, French serial killer
- 14 May – Mickaël Landreau, soccer player.
- 19 May – Nicolas Figère, hammer thrower.
- 21 May – Gaspard Augé, musician.
- 4 June – Anthony Charteau, cyclist.
- 5 June – François Sagat, model and pornographic actor.
- 9 June – Émilie Loit, tennis player.
- 12 June – Damien Traille, rugby union player.
- 16 June – Emmanuel Moire, singer.
- 25 June – Sébastien Joly, cyclist.
- 26 June – Christophe Humbert, judoka.
- 27 June – Benoît Poher, singer.
- 30 June – Sylvain Chavanel, cyclist.

=== July to September ===
- 1 July – Sylvain Calzati, cyclist.
- 3 July – Ludivine Sagnier, actress.
- 4 July – Anthony Basso, soccer player.
- 5 July – Amélie Mauresmo, tennis player.
- 6 July:
  - Fabrice Abriel, soccer player.
  - Cédric Kanté, soccer player.
- 11 July – Eric Abidal, soccer player.
- 16 July – Rudy Bourguignon, decathlete.
- 18 July – Mélina Robert-Michon, discus thrower.
- 19 July – Yves Desmarets, soccer player.
- 20 July – Anaïs Baydemir, weather presenter.
- 24 July – Anne-Gaëlle Sidot, tennis player.
- 27 July:
  - Sidney Govou, international soccer player.
  - Julien Poueys, soccer player.
- 8 August – Benjamin Boyet, rugby union player.
- 10 August – Rémy Martin, rugby union player.
- 11 August – Nicolas Seube, soccer player.
- 14 August:
  - Jérémie Bréchet, soccer player.
  - Séverine Brémond, tennis player.
  - Renaud Guigue, rugby league player.
- 17 August – Julien Escudé, soccer player.
- 9 September – Freddy Bichot, cyclist.
- 10 September – Sébastien Grimaldi, soccer player.
- 19 September – Noémie Lenoir, model and actress.
- 20 September – Aurélie Trouvé, politician
- 24 September – Yvan Bourgis, soccer player.
- 25 September – Jean-René Lisnard, tennis player.
- 26 September – Jean-Baptiste Poux, rugby union player.

=== October to December ===
- 14 October:
  - Olivier Bernard, soccer player.
  - Auriol Guillaume, soccer player.
- 18 October – Fabrice Levrat, soccer player.
- 27 October – Jean-Luc Delpech, cyclist.
- 1 November – Christophe Edaleine, cyclist.
- 8 November – Corinne Maîtrejean, foil fencer.
- 10 November – Anthony Réveillère, soccer player.
- 13 November – Manuela Montebrun, hammer thrower.
- 14 November – Cédric Hervé, cyclist.
- 15 November – François Masson, soccer player.
- 19 November – Boumedienne Allam, rugby union player.
- 24 December:
  - Hervé Duclos-Lassalle, cyclist.
  - Virginie Arnold, archer.
- 25 December – Laurent Bonnart, soccer player.

=== Full date unknown ===
- Éric Bourdon, painter and writer.
- Christophe Dumaux, classical countertenor.
- Élise Fouin, designer.

== Deaths ==
=== January to March ===
- 16 January – André Couder, optician and astronomer (born 1897).
- 18 January – Maurice Challe, General (born 1905).
- 26 January – Paul Amiot, actor (born 1886).
- 12 February – Jean Renoir, film director (born 1894).
- 9 March – Jean-Marie Villot, Cardinal (born 1905).
- 16 March – Jean Monnet, architect of European Unity (born 1888).
- 19 March – Pierre Schneiter, politician (born 1905).

=== April to June ===
- 1 April – Bruno Coquatrix, songwriter and music impresario (born 1910).
- 4 April – Joseph Alcazar, international soccer player (born 1911).
- 7 April – Marcel Jouhandeau, writer (born 1888).
- 12 May – Pierre Brunet, rowing coxswain and Olympic medallist (born 1908).
- 28 June – Philippe Cousteau, oceanographer (born 1940).

=== July to September ===
- 3 July – Louis Durey, composer (born 1888).
- 5 July – Émile Dewoitine, aviation engineer and industrialist (born 1892).
- 15 July – Georges Jean Marie Darrieus, aeronautical engineer (born 1888).
- 27 August – Paul Coste-Floret, politician (born 1911).
- 2 September – Jacques Février, pianist (born 1900).
- 10 September – Charles Fauvel, aircraft designer (born 1904).
- 20 September – Pierre Goldman, left-wing intellectual, convicted of several robberies and assassinated (born 1944).
- 27 September – Pascal Pia, writer, journalist, illustrator and scholar (born 1903).

=== October to December ===
- 3 October – André Godinat, cyclist (born 1903).
- 10 October – Paul Paray, conductor, organist and composer (born 1886).
- 17 October – Pierre Bernac, baritone (born 1899).
- 22 October – Nadia Boulanger, composer and conductor (born 1887).
- 27 October – Germaine Lubin, soprano (born 1890).
- 29 October – Robert Boulin, politician (born 1920).
- 2 November – Jacques Mesrine, gangster (born 1936).
- 7 November – Christine Renard, writer (born 1929).
- 8 November – Yvonne de Gaulle, wife of Charles de Gaulle (born 1900).
- 26 November – Marcel L'Herbier, writer, producer and director of films (b. c1890).
- 4 December – Maurice Dorléac, actor (born 1901).

=== Full date unknown ===
- Jean Charlot, painter and illustrator (born 1898).
- Maryse Choisy, philosophical writer (born 1903).
- Lise Deharme, writer (born 1898).
- François Fontan, politician (born 1929).
- Émile Gagnan, engineer and inventor (born 1900).
- Albert Gilles, copper craftsman (born 1895).
- Gaston Heuet, athlete and Olympic medallist (born 1892).

== See also ==
- List of French films of 1979
