= List of Maltese football transfers summer 2011 =

This is a list of Maltese football transfers for the 2011–12 summer transfer window by club. Only transfers of clubs in the Maltese Premier League and Maltese First Division are included.

The summer transfer window opened on 1 July 2011, although a few transfers may take place prior to that date. The window closed at midnight on 31 August 2011. Players without a club may join one at any time, either during or in between transfer windows.

== Maltese Premier League ==
=== Balzan Youths ===
In: Note: Flags indicate national team as defined under FIFA eligibility rules; some limited exceptions apply. Players may hold more than one non-FIFA nationality.

No.	Pos.	Nation	Player
—	DF	MLT	Bjorn Bondin (on loan from Valletta)
—	DF	MLT	Renie Forace (on loan from Valletta)
—	DF	MLT	Jonathan Francica (on loan from Valletta)
—	MF	MLT	Dylan Grima (on loan from Valletta)
—	DF	MLT	Yessous Camilleri (on loan from Valletta)

Out: Note: Flags indicate national team as defined under FIFA eligibility rules; some limited exceptions apply. Players may hold more than one non-FIFA nationality.

No.	Pos.	Nation	Player

=== Birkirkara ===
In: Note: Flags indicate national team as defined under FIFA eligibility rules; some limited exceptions apply. Players may hold more than one non-FIFA nationality.

No.	Pos.	Nation	Player
1	GK	ESP	Jorge Mora (from Unknown)
5	DF	LVA	Mārcis Savinovs (from (Latvia) FK Jelgava)
15	MF	AUS	Leighton Grech (from Hibernians)
4	MF	MLT	Gareth Sciberras (from Marsaxlokk)

Out: Note: Flags indicate national team as defined under FIFA eligibility rules; some limited exceptions apply. Players may hold more than one non-FIFA nationality.

No.	Pos.	Nation	Player
22	GK	SCO	Michael Fraser (released)
3	DF	MLT	Andrei Agius (released)
15	DF	SRB	Nikola Vukanac (released)
13	FW	NGA	Ibrahim Babatunde (released)
9	FW	MLT	Michael Galea (retired)
29	FW	LTU	Rodolfo Kumbrevicius (released)

=== Floriana ===
In: Note: Flags indicate national team as defined under FIFA eligibility rules; some limited exceptions apply. Players may hold more than one non-FIFA nationality.

No.	Pos.	Nation	Player
—	MF	MLT	Christian Cassar (from Marsaxlokk)
—	FW	ARG	Julio Alcorsé (from Marsaxlokk)

Out: Note: Flags indicate national team as defined under FIFA eligibility rules; some limited exceptions apply. Players may hold more than one non-FIFA nationality.

No.	Pos.	Nation	Player
2	DF	MLT	Brian Said (released)
11	FW	MLT	Daniel Nwoke (released)
—	GK	ENG	Matthew Towns (released)

=== Ħamrun Spartans ===
In: Note: Flags indicate national team as defined under FIFA eligibility rules; some limited exceptions apply. Players may hold more than one non-FIFA nationality.

No.	Pos.	Nation	Player
—	MF	MLT	Kevin Sammut (on loan from Valletta)

Out: Note: Flags indicate national team as defined under FIFA eligibility rules; some limited exceptions apply. Players may hold more than one non-FIFA nationality.

No.	Pos.	Nation	Player
19	FW	BRA	Marcelo Pereira (to Vittoriosa Stars)

=== Hibernians ===
In: Note: Flags indicate national team as defined under FIFA eligibility rules; some limited exceptions apply. Players may hold more than one non-FIFA nationality.

No.	Pos.	Nation	Player

Out: Note: Flags indicate national team as defined under FIFA eligibility rules; some limited exceptions apply. Players may hold more than one non-FIFA nationality.

No.	Pos.	Nation	Player
—	DF	MLT	Yan Cauchi (to Rabat Ajax)
22	DF	ENG	Matthew Clarke (other)
—	MF	AUS	Leighton Grech (to Birkirkara)
18	MF	NED	Abdelilah Taki (released)
13	FW	SCO	Brian Fairbairn (released)
—	FW	SCO	Paul McManus (to (Scotland) Brechin City)

=== Marsaxlokk ===
In: Note: Flags indicate national team as defined under FIFA eligibility rules; some limited exceptions apply. Players may hold more than one non-FIFA nationality.

No.	Pos.	Nation	Player
—	MF	BRA	Carlos Campagnoli (from Vittoriosa Stars)

Out: Note: Flags indicate national team as defined under FIFA eligibility rules; some limited exceptions apply. Players may hold more than one non-FIFA nationality.

No.	Pos.	Nation	Player
21	GK	MLT	Glenn Zammit (on loan to Mosta)
17	DF	BUL	Rumen Galabov (to Sliema Wanderers)
27	DF	MLT	Shawn Tellus (to Vittoriosa Stars)
—	MF	MLT	Christian Cassar (to Floriana)
4	MF	MLT	Gareth Sciberras (to Birkirkara)
10	FW	ARG	Julio Alcorsé (to Floriana)
11	FW	NGA	Alfred Effiong (to Valletta)

=== Mosta ===
In: Note: Flags indicate national team as defined under FIFA eligibility rules; some limited exceptions apply. Players may hold more than one non-FIFA nationality.

No.	Pos.	Nation	Player
—	GK	MLT	Glenn Zammit (on loan from Marsaxlokk)
—	DF	MLT	Luca Martinelli (on loan from Sliema Wanderers)
—	MF	POR	Rudy Goncalves Alhinho (from Melita)
—	FW	MLT	Ian Zammit (on loan from Valletta)
—	MF	MLT	Kurt Magro (on loan from Valletta)

Out: Note: Flags indicate national team as defined under FIFA eligibility rules; some limited exceptions apply. Players may hold more than one non-FIFA nationality.

No.	Pos.	Nation	Player

=== Mqabba ===
In: Note: Flags indicate national team as defined under FIFA eligibility rules; some limited exceptions apply. Players may hold more than one non-FIFA nationality.

No.	Pos.	Nation	Player
—	DF	MLT	Ryan Sammut (from Dingli Swallows)

Out: Note: Flags indicate national team as defined under FIFA eligibility rules; some limited exceptions apply. Players may hold more than one non-FIFA nationality.

No.	Pos.	Nation	Player

=== Qormi ===
In: Note: Flags indicate national team as defined under FIFA eligibility rules; some limited exceptions apply. Players may hold more than one non-FIFA nationality.

No.	Pos.	Nation	Player
11	FW	NGA	Daniel Nwoke (from Free Agent)
—	MF	BRA	Giuseppe Vela Junior (from Anagennisi Karditsa F.C.)
—	FW	BRA	Jorge Pereira Da Silva (from Unknown)
—	MF	MLT	Dino Cachia (from Vittoriosa Stars F.C.)
—	FW	MLT	Charlon Sammut ( Dingli Swallows F.C.)
—	GK	MLT	Steve Sultana (Nadur Youngsters)
13	DF	MLT	Jeffrey Chetcuti (from Vittoriosa Stars F.C.)
17	DF	MLT	Kenneth Scicluna (from Valletta F.C.)

Out: Note: Flags indicate national team as defined under FIFA eligibility rules; some limited exceptions apply. Players may hold more than one non-FIFA nationality.

No.	Pos.	Nation	Player
—	MF	MLT	Keith Fenech (retired)

=== Sliema Wanderers ===
In: Note: Flags indicate national team as defined under FIFA eligibility rules; some limited exceptions apply. Players may hold more than one non-FIFA nationality.

No.	Pos.	Nation	Player
—	DF	BUL	Rumen Galabov (from Marsaxlokk)
—	MF	MLT	Ryan Grech (from Vittoriosa Stars)
—	FW	BRA	Jorge Santos Silva (from Vittoriosa Stars)
—	FW	BUL	Danail Mitev (from (Israel) Bnei Sakhnin)
—	DF	MLT	Steve Bezzina (on loan from Valletta)
—	MF	MLT	Cleavon Frendo (on loan from Valletta)

Out: Note: Flags indicate national team as defined under FIFA eligibility rules; some limited exceptions apply. Players may hold more than one non-FIFA nationality.

No.	Pos.	Nation	Player
—	DF	MLT	Luca Martinelli (on loan to Mosta)
7	MF	MLT	Noel Turner (retired)

=== Tarxien Rainbows ===
In: Note: Flags indicate national team as defined under FIFA eligibility rules; some limited exceptions apply. Players may hold more than one non-FIFA nationality.

No.	Pos.	Nation	Player
—	GK	MLT	Nicky Vella (from Valletta)
—	GK	MLT	David Cassar (from Hibernians F.C.)
—	DF	MLT	Carl Sammut (from Vittoriosa Stars)
—	FW	MLT	Adrian Carabott (on loan from Valletta)
—	FW	MLT	Karl Pulo (from Birkirkara F.C.)
—	FW	BRA	Rodrigo Andreis Galvão (from Free Agent)

Out: Note: Flags indicate national team as defined under FIFA eligibility rules; some limited exceptions apply. Players may hold more than one non-FIFA nationality.

No.	Pos.	Nation	Player
—	FW	BRA	Cristiano dos Santos Rodrigues (to White City FC.)

=== Valletta ===
In: Note: Flags indicate national team as defined under FIFA eligibility rules; some limited exceptions apply. Players may hold more than one non-FIFA nationality.

No.	Pos.	Nation	Player
—	MF	BFA	Ousseni Zongo (from (Portugal) Arouca)
—	FW	NGA	Alfred Effiong (from Marsaxlokk)
—	FW	MLT	Michael Mifsud (from Free Agent)
—	FW	BRA	William (from Free Agent)
—	GK	ENG	Matthew Towns (from Free Agent)

Out: Note: Flags indicate national team as defined under FIFA eligibility rules; some limited exceptions apply. Players may hold more than one non-FIFA nationality.

No.	Pos.	Nation	Player
28	GK	MLT	Nicky Vella (to Tarxien Rainbows)
—	DF	MLT	Yessous Camilleri (on loan to Balzan Youths)
14	MF	NGA	Omonigho Temile (released)
11	FW	BRA	Anderson Antunes (released)
30	FW	CMR	Njongo Priso (to (Cyprus) AEK Larnaca)
23	MF	MLT	Kevin Sammut (on loan to Ħamrun Spartans)
9	FW	MLT	Ian Zammit (on loan to Mosta)
26	MF	MLT	Cleavon Frendo (on loan to Sliema Wanderers)
16	MF	MLT	Kurt Magro (on loan to Mosta)
—	DF	MLT	Bjorn Bondin (on loan to Balzan Youths)
—	DF	MLT	Renie Forace (on loan to Balzan Youths)
—	MF	MLT	Dylan Grima (on loan to Balzan Youths)
—	DF	MLT	Jonathan Francica (on loan to Balzan Youths)
—	FW	MLT	Clifford Gauci (on loan to Rabat Ajax)
—	DF	MLT	Steve Bezzina (on loan to Sliema Wanderers)
—	MF	MLT	Adrian Carabott (on loan to Tarxien Rainbows)
—	MF	MLT	Mark Barbara (to Vittoriosa Stars)
—	DF	MLT	Kenneth Scicluna (to Qormi)

== Maltese First Division ==
=== Birzebbuga St.Peters ===
In: Note: Flags indicate national team as defined under FIFA eligibility rules; some limited exceptions apply. Players may hold more than one non-FIFA nationality.

No.	Pos.	Nation	Player

Out: Note: Flags indicate national team as defined under FIFA eligibility rules; some limited exceptions apply. Players may hold more than one non-FIFA nationality.

No.	Pos.	Nation	Player

=== Dingli Swallows ===
In: Note: Flags indicate national team as defined under FIFA eligibility rules; some limited exceptions apply. Players may hold more than one non-FIFA nationality.

No.	Pos.	Nation	Player

Out: Note: Flags indicate national team as defined under FIFA eligibility rules; some limited exceptions apply. Players may hold more than one non-FIFA nationality.

No.	Pos.	Nation	Player
—	DF	MLT	Ryan Sammut (from Mqabba)

=== Lija Athletic ===
In: Note: Flags indicate national team as defined under FIFA eligibility rules; some limited exceptions apply. Players may hold more than one non-FIFA nationality.

No.	Pos.	Nation	Player

Out: Note: Flags indicate national team as defined under FIFA eligibility rules; some limited exceptions apply. Players may hold more than one non-FIFA nationality.

No.	Pos.	Nation	Player

=== Melita ===
In: Note: Flags indicate national team as defined under FIFA eligibility rules; some limited exceptions apply. Players may hold more than one non-FIFA nationality.

No.	Pos.	Nation	Player

Out: Note: Flags indicate national team as defined under FIFA eligibility rules; some limited exceptions apply. Players may hold more than one non-FIFA nationality.

No.	Pos.	Nation	Player
—	MF	POR	Rudy Goncalves Alhinho (to Mosta)

=== Naxxar Lions ===
In: Note: Flags indicate national team as defined under FIFA eligibility rules; some limited exceptions apply. Players may hold more than one non-FIFA nationality.

No.	Pos.	Nation	Player

Out: Note: Flags indicate national team as defined under FIFA eligibility rules; some limited exceptions apply. Players may hold more than one non-FIFA nationality.

No.	Pos.	Nation	Player

=== Pietà Hotspurs ===
In: Note: Flags indicate national team as defined under FIFA eligibility rules; some limited exceptions apply. Players may hold more than one non-FIFA nationality.

No.	Pos.	Nation	Player

Out: Note: Flags indicate national team as defined under FIFA eligibility rules; some limited exceptions apply. Players may hold more than one non-FIFA nationality.

No.	Pos.	Nation	Player

=== Rabat Ajax ===
In: Note: Flags indicate national team as defined under FIFA eligibility rules; some limited exceptions apply. Players may hold more than one non-FIFA nationality.

No.	Pos.	Nation	Player
—	FW	MLT	Clifford Gauci (on loan from Valletta)
—	DF	MLT	Yan Cauchi (from Hibernians)

Out: Note: Flags indicate national team as defined under FIFA eligibility rules; some limited exceptions apply. Players may hold more than one non-FIFA nationality.

No.	Pos.	Nation	Player

=== St. Andrews ===
In: Note: Flags indicate national team as defined under FIFA eligibility rules; some limited exceptions apply. Players may hold more than one non-FIFA nationality.

No.	Pos.	Nation	Player

Out: Note: Flags indicate national team as defined under FIFA eligibility rules; some limited exceptions apply. Players may hold more than one non-FIFA nationality.

No.	Pos.	Nation	Player

=== St. George's ===
In: Note: Flags indicate national team as defined under FIFA eligibility rules; some limited exceptions apply. Players may hold more than one non-FIFA nationality.

No.	Pos.	Nation	Player

Out: Note: Flags indicate national team as defined under FIFA eligibility rules; some limited exceptions apply. Players may hold more than one non-FIFA nationality.

No.	Pos.	Nation	Player

=== St. Patrick ===
In: Note: Flags indicate national team as defined under FIFA eligibility rules; some limited exceptions apply. Players may hold more than one non-FIFA nationality.

No.	Pos.	Nation	Player

Out: Note: Flags indicate national team as defined under FIFA eligibility rules; some limited exceptions apply. Players may hold more than one non-FIFA nationality.

No.	Pos.	Nation	Player

=== Vittoriosa Stars ===
In: Note: Flags indicate national team as defined under FIFA eligibility rules; some limited exceptions apply. Players may hold more than one non-FIFA nationality.

No.	Pos.	Nation	Player
—	DF	MLT	Shawn Tellus (from Marsaxlokk)
—	FW	BRA	Marcelo Pereira (from Ħamrun Spartans)
—	MF	MLT	Mark Barbara (from Valletta)

Out: Note: Flags indicate national team as defined under FIFA eligibility rules; some limited exceptions apply. Players may hold more than one non-FIFA nationality.

No.	Pos.	Nation	Player
80	MF	BRA	Carlos Campagnoli (to Vittoriosa Stars)
22	MF	MLT	Ryan Grech (to Sliema Wanderers)
14	FW	BRA	Jorge Santos Silva (to Sliema Wanderers)

=== Zejtun Corinthians ===
In: Note: Flags indicate national team as defined under FIFA eligibility rules; some limited exceptions apply. Players may hold more than one non-FIFA nationality.

No.	Pos.	Nation	Player

Out: Note: Flags indicate national team as defined under FIFA eligibility rules; some limited exceptions apply. Players may hold more than one non-FIFA nationality.

No.	Pos.	Nation	Player

== Manager Transfers ==
Name	Moving from	Moving to	Source
(Malta) Winston Muscat	Vittoriosa Stars	released	
(Malta) Paul Zammit	Birkirkara	released	
(Serbia) Branko Nisevic	Birkirkara (Assistant Manager)	released	
(Malta) Patrick Curmi	Marsaxlokk	Birkirkara	
(Malta) Joe Brincat	San Gwann	Vittoriosa Stars	
(Malta) Peter Pullicino	Marsaxlokk (Assistant Manager)	Birkirkara (Assistant Manager)	
(Malta) Joey Falzon	St. George's	Zejtun Corinthians	
(Malta) Steve D'Amato	Ħamrun Spartans	Qormi F.C. (Technical Advisor)	
(Malta) Winston Muscat	Unattached	Marsaxlokk	
(Malta) Gerard Ellul	Vittoriosa Stars	Valletta F.C. (Team Manager)	
(Malta) Jesmond Zammit	Valletta F.C. (Team Manager)	Ħamrun Spartans	

== See also ==
- (Netherlands) List of Dutch football transfers summer 2011
- (England) List of English football transfers summer 2011
- (France) List of French football transfers summer 2011
- (Germany) List of German football transfers summer 2011
- (Italy) List of Italian football transfers summer 2011
- (Portugal) List of Portuguese football transfers summer 2011
- (Spain) List of Spanish football transfers summer 2011
- (Sweden) List of Swedish football transfers summer 2011
