= Ruffier =

Ruffier can be both a middle name and a surname. Notable people with the surname include:

- Jean Ruffier des Aimés (1902–1976), French rower
- James Ruffier (born 1974), French racing driver
- Romain Ruffier (born 1989), French football goalkeeper
- Stéphane Ruffier (born 1986), French football goalkeeper

== See also ==
- Arboretum Robert Ruffier-Lanche, arboretum on the Université Grenoble Alpes campus
- Ruffy (disambiguation)
