= Galabov =

Galabov (Bulgarian: Гълъбов, from гълъб meaning pigeon or dove) is a Bulgarian masculine surname, its feminine counterpart being Galabova (Bulgarian: Гълъбова), and may refer to:

- Plamen Galabov (born 1995), Bulgarian footballer
- Rumen Galabov (born 1978), former Bulgarian footballer
