= Planus =

Planus is a surname of French origin. People with that name include:

- Marc Planus (born 1982), French footballer
- Pierre Planus (born 1979), French footballer

Planus may also refer to:

== Other uses ==
- Doctor Planus et utilis, a scholastic accolade awarded to the Franciscan teacher Nicholas of Lyra (c.1270–1349)
- Cantus planus, Latin for plainsong (or, plainchant), a body of chants used in the liturgies of the Western Church
- Lichen planus, a disease of the skin and/or mucous membranes that resembles lichen
- Pes planus, a medical term for flat feet (or, fallen arches), a postural deformity in which the arches of the foot collapse
