= List of French football transfers summer 2011 =

This is a list of French football transfers for the 2011 summer transfer window. The summer transfer window opened on 9 June 2011 and closed at midnight on 31 August 2011. Only moves involving Ligue 1 and Ligue 2 clubs are listed. Players without a club may join one at any time, either during or in between transfer windows.

== Transfers ==
Date	Name	Moving from	Moving to	Fee
27 April 2011	(France) Thomas Guerbert	Luzenac	Dijon	Free
5 May 2011	(France) Akim Orinel	Fréjus Saint-Raphaël	Châteauroux	Free
18 May 2011	(France) Mickaël Caradec	Bayonne	Châteauroux	Free
19 May 2011	(Algeria) Florian Makhedjouf	Paris Saint-Germain	Sedan	Free
21 May 2011	(France) Antoine Jouan	Montpellier	Clermont	Free
21 May 2011	(Brazil) Guilherme Moreira	(Hungary) Budapest Honvéd	Clermont	Undisclosed
23 May 2011	(France) Claudio Beauvue	Troyes	Châteauroux	Loan
23 May 2011	(France) Régis Gurtner	Strasbourg	Boulogne	Free
23 May 2011	(France) Diadié Diarra	Mantes	Valenciennes	Undisclosed
23 May 2011	(France) Oumar N'Diaye	Toulouse Croix-Daurade	Metz	Free
24 May 2011	(France) Christopher Jouffreau	Changé	Dijon	Undisclosed
24 May 2011	(Senegal) Ousmane N'Diaye	Lyon	Arles-Avignon	Free
24 May 2011	(France) Josuè Balamandji	Villemomble	Reims	Free
25 May 2011	(Brazil) Thiago Xavier	Châteauroux	Troyes	Undisclosed
26 May 2011	(France) Jérôme Rothen	Unattached	Bastia	Free
26 May 2011	(France) Ali Mathlouthi	Strasbourg	Lens	Undisclosed
26 May 2011	(France) Cédric Avinel	Cannes	Clermont	Free
28 May 2011	(France) Omar Kossoko	Amiens	Auxerre	Free
28 May 2011	(France) Loïc Puyo	Auxerre	Amiens	Free
29 May 2011	(France) Mathieu Duhamel	Troyes	Metz	Undisclosed
29 May 2011	(Senegal) Oumar Pouye	Evian	Angers	Free
30 May 2011	(France) Benjamin Boulenger	Aulnoye-Aymeries	Boulogne	Free
30 May 2011	(France) Hervé Bazile	Guingamp	Amiens	Free
30 May 2011	(Republic of the Congo) Bruce Abdoulaye	Clermont	Metz	Free
30 May 2011	(France) Kévin Rimane	Paris Saint-Germain	Boulogne	Free
31 May 2011	(France) Baptiste Reynet	Martigues	Dijon	Free
1 June 2011	(France) Pierre Bouby	Evian	Metz	Free
1 June 2011	(France) Pierre-Baptiste Baherlé	Lille	Boulogne	Free
1 June 2011	(France) Grégory Thil	Boulogne	Dijon	Free
2 June 2011	(France) Benoît Pedretti	Auxerre	Lille	Undisclosed
2 June 2011	(France) Kévin Aubeneau	Niort	Laval	Free
2 June 2011	(France) Téji Savanier	Montpellier	Arles-Avignon	Free
2 June 2011	(France) Hugo Rodriguez	Montpellier	Arles-Avignon	Free
2 June 2011	(Comoros) Mohamed M'Changama	Nîmes	Amiens	Free
3 June 2011	(France) Camel Meriem	Arles-Avignon	Nice	Free
3 June 2011	(France) Florent Chaigneau	Le Poiré-sur-Vie	Lorient	Free
3 June 2011	(France) Hamady Tamboura	Evian	Angers	Free
3 June 2011	(France) Antoine Ponroy	Evian	Laval	Free
4 June 2011	(France) Jordan Galtier	Fréjus Saint-Raphaël	Arles-Avignon	Free
6 June 2011	(France) Romain Armand	Montpellier	Clermont	Free
6 June 2011	(France) Youri Coutin	Brest	Nantes	Free
6 June 2011	(France) Ibrahim Sacko	Brest	Valenciennes	Free
7 June 2011	(France) Ludovic Baal	Le Mans	Lens	Free
7 June 2011	(Portugal) Pedrinho	(Portugal) Académica de Coimbra	Lorient	Free
8 June 2011	(France) Yohan Betsch	Strasbourg	Metz	Free
9 June 2011	(France) Morgan Amalfitano	Lorient	Marseille	Free
9 June 2011	(Israel) Eden Ben Basat	(Israel) Hapoel Haifa	Brest	Free
9 June 2011	(France) Matthieu Saunier	Bordeaux	Troyes	Undisclosed
9 June 2011	(France) Lionel Cappone	Lorient	Brest	Free
9 June 2011	(France) Julien Féret	Nancy	Rennes	Undisclosed
9 June 2011	(Colombia) Jhon Culma	(Israel) Maccabi Haifa	Brest	Free
9 June 2011	(Cameroon) Henri Bedimo	Lens	Montpellier	Undisclosed
10 June 2011	(Gabon) Frédéric Bulot	AS Monaco	Caen	Free
10 June 2011	(France) Samuel Souprayen	Rennes	Dijon	Undisclosed
10 June 2011	(France) Ulrich Ramé	Bordeaux	Sedan	Free
11 June 2011	(France) Nicolas Douchez	Rennes	Paris Saint-Germain	Free
11 June 2011	(North Macedonia) Vlade Lazarevski	(Kazakhstan) Astana	Amiens	Free
12 June 2011	(Nigeria) Vincent Enyeama	(Israel) Hapoel Tel Aviv	Lille	Undisclosed
12 June 2011	(France) Kevin Gameiro	Lorient	Paris Saint-Germain	€11m
13 June 2011	(France) Ronny Rodelin	Nantes	Lille	Undisclosed
13 June 2011	(France) Tristan Do	Strasbourg	Lorient	Free
13 June 2011	(Algeria) Mehdi Mostefa	Nîmes	Ajaccio	Undisclosed
14 June 2011	(France) Nicolas Fauvergue	Lille	Sedan	Undisclosed
14 June 2011	(France) Benoît Costil	Sedan	Rennes	Free
15 June 2011	(Tunisia) Saber Khelifa	(Tunisia) Espérance	Evian	Undisclosed
15 June 2011	(France) Kenny Lala	Paris	Valenciennes	Undisclosed
15 June 2011	(France) Marco Rosenfelder	Strasbourg	Lens	Free
16 June 2011	(France) Rudy Haddad	Châteauroux	Auxerre	Undisclosed
16 June 2011	(France) Fabrice Ehret	(Germany) 1. FC Köln	Evian	Free
16 June 2011	(France) Romain Ruffier	Unattached	Amiens	Free
16 June 2011	(France) Lhadji Badiane	Rennes	Laval	Free
16 June 2011	(France) Vincent Le Baron	Vannes	Laval	Free
16 June 2011	(Mali) Éric Chelle	Lens	Istres	Free
16 June 2011	(Tunisia) Aymen Abdennour	(Tunisia) Étoile du Sahel	Toulouse	€450k
17 June 2011	(France) Brice Jovial	Le Havre	Dijon	Undisclosed
17 June 2011	(France) Alexandre Cuvillier	Boulogne	Nancy	Undisclosed
19 June 2011	(France) Jérémy Morel	Lorient	Marseille	€2.5m
20 June 2011	(France) Nicolas Pallois	Valenciennes	Laval	Loan
20 June 2011	(France) Zakaria Diallo	(Belgium) Sporting Charleroi	Dijon	Free
20 June 2011	(France) Mathieu Coutadeur	AS Monaco	Lorient	Undisclosed
20 June 2011	(France) Mamadou Camara	Niort	Guingamp	Free
21 June 2011	(France) Sébastien Roudet	Lens	Sochaux	Undisclosed
21 June 2011	(France) Vincent Bessat	Boulogne	Nantes	Free
22 June 2011	(Serbia) Pavle Ninkov	(Serbia) Red Star Belgrade	Toulouse	Undisclosed
22 June 2011	(Ivory Coast) Mamadou Doumbia	Istres	Le Mans	Free
22 June 2011	(France) Julien Toudic	Caen	Lens	Undisclosed
22 June 2011	(Norway) Thorstein Helstad	Le Mans	AS Monaco	Undisclosed
23 June 2011	(France) James Fanchone	Lorient	Le Havre	Free
23 June 2011	(France) Lossémy Karaboué	Sedan	Nancy	Undisclosed
23 June 2011	(Montenegro) Marko Baša	(Russia) Lokomotiv Moscow	Lille	Undisclosed
24 June 2011	(France) Nicolas Maurice-Belay	Sochaux	Bordeaux	Free
24 June 2011	(France) Christophe Kerbrat	Plabennec	Guingamp	Free
24 June 2011	(France) Ludovic Butelle	Lille	Arles-Avignon	Free
24 June 2011	(France) Marcel Essombé	Pacy Vallée-d'Eure	Châteauroux	Free
24 June 2011	(France) Aurélien Capoue	Nantes	Boulogne	Free
24 June 2011	(France) Florent Sinama Pongolle	(Portugal) Sporting	Saint-Étienne	Loan
25 June 2011	(France) Thomas Gamiette	Reims	Tours	Free
27 June 2011	(France) Paul Lasne	Bordeaux	Ajaccio	Free
27 June 2011	(France) Pierre Ducasse	Bordeaux	Lens	Free
27 June 2011	(France) Grégory Paisley	Nice	Guingamp	Free
27 June 2011	(Ghana) Mohammed Rabiu	(Italy) Udinese	Evian	Undisclosed
28 June 2011	(France) Dimitri Payet	Saint-Étienne	Lille	€9m
28 June 2011	(France) Bira Dembélé	Rennes	Sedan	Free
28 June 2011	(France) Maurice Dalé	(Romania) Unirea Urziceni	Nantes	Free
28 June 2011	(France) Julien Quercia	Auxerre	Lorient	Free
28 June 2011	(France) Franck Julienne	Rennes	Le Havre	Loan
29 June 2011	(Turkey) Umut Bulut	(Turkey) Trabzonspor	Toulouse	€4m
29 June 2011	(France) Virgile Reset	Vannes	Boulogne	Free
29 June 2011	(Guinea-Bissau) Kevin Gomis	(Portugal) Naval	Nice	Free
29 June 2011	(France) Steven Mouyokolo	(England) Wolverhampton Wanderers	Sochaux	Loan
29 June 2011	(Cameroon) Nicolas N'Koulou	AS Monaco	Marseille	€3.5m
29 June 2011	(Czech Republic) David Rozehnal	(Germany) Hamburger SV	Lille	€500k
29 June 2011	(Ivory Coast) Abdoulaye Méïté	(England) West Brom	Dijon	Free
30 June 2011	(Togo) Senah Mango	Marseille	AS Monaco	Loan
30 June 2011	(France) Sébastien Corchia	Le Mans	Sochaux	Undisclosed
30 June 2011	(France) Rémy Riou	Auxerre	Toulouse	Free
30 June 2011	(France) Thomas Régnier	Mulhouse	Lille	Free
1 July 2011	(France) Fatih Atik	Boulogne	Guingamp	Free
1 July 2011	(Tunisia) Issam Jemâa	Lens	Auxerre	Undisclosed
1 July 2011	(France) Benjamin Gavanon	Nancy	Amiens	Free
1 July 2011	(France) Yohan Hautcoeur	Le Mans	Châteauroux	Free
4 July 2011	(France) Alou Diarra	Bordeaux	Marseille	Undisclosed
4 July 2011	(Israel) Ben Sahar	(Spain) Espanyol	Auxerre	Loan
4 July 2011	(France) Romain Ciaravino	Istres	Laval	Free
4 July 2011	(Tunisia) Khaled Melliti	(Tunisia) Club Africain	Istres	Free
4 July 2011	(Cameroon) Landry N'Guemo	Nancy	Bordeaux	Free
4 July 2011	(France) Younousse Sankharé	Paris Saint-Germain	Dijon	€1m
5 July 2011	(France) Sidney Govou	(Greece) Panathinaikos	Evian	Free
5 July 2011	(France) Jerry Vandam	Lille	Caen	Loan
5 July 2011	(France) Jérôme Leroy	Rennes	Evian	Free
5 July 2011	(France) Gennaro Bracigliano	Nancy	Marseille	Free
5 July 2011	(France) Samuel Bouhours	Le Mans	Ajaccio	Free
5 July 2011	(France) Jérémie Aliadière	Unattached	Lorient	Free
5 July 2011	(France) Jean-François Rivière	Ajaccio	Clermont	Free
6 July 2011	(Algeria) Brahim Bedbouda	(Algeria) MC Alger	Le Mans	Free
6 July 2011	(Morocco) Yacine Qasmi	Paris Saint-Germain	Rennes	Free
7 July 2011	(Brazil) Paulão	(Portugal) Braga	Saint-Étienne	Free
7 July 2011	(Mali) Cheick Fantamady Diarra	(Mali) Stade Malien	Rennes	Undisclosed
7 July 2011	(Algeria) Sid Ali Yahia-Chérif	(Algeria) JS Kabylie	Istres	Free
7 July 2011	(Burkina Faso) Jonathan Pitroipa	(Germany) Hamburger SV	Rennes	Undisclosed
8 July 2011	(Ghana) Jonathan Mensah	(Italy) Udinese	Evian	Free
8 July 2011	(Morocco) Khalid Sekkat	(Morocco) Wydad Casablanca	Reims	Free
9 July 2011	(Mexico) Guillermo Ochoa	(Mexico) Club América	Ajaccio	Free
9 July 2011	(France) Salif Sané	Bordeaux	Nancy	Loan
11 July 2011	(Argentina) Fabián Monzón	(Argentina) Boca Juniors	Nice	Undisclosed
11 July 2011	(Senegal) Leyti N'Diaye	Marseille	Ajaccio	Loan
11 July 2011	(Argentina) Lucas Mareque	(Argentina) Independiente	Lorient	Free
11 July 2011	(France) Stéphane Ruffier	AS Monaco	Saint-Étienne	€3m
12 July 2011	(France) Emmanuel Rivière	Saint-Étienne	Toulouse	€6m
12 July 2011	(Ghana) Haminu Draman	(Russia) Lokomotiv Moscow	Arles-Avignon	Free
12 July 2011	(France) Didier Digard	(England) Middlesbrough	Nice	Undisclosed
13 July 2011	(France) Pierre-Alain Frau	Lille	Caen	Free
13 July 2011	(Gabon) Pierre-Emerick Aubameyang	(Italy) Milan	Saint-Étienne	Loan
14 July 2011	(Senegal) Massamba Sambou	(Greece) Atromitos	Troyes	Free
14 July 2011	(France) Grégory Dutil	Fréjus Saint-Raphaël	Nîmes	Free
14 July 2011	(France) Mamadou Diallo	Le Havre	Sedan	Free
14 July 2011	(Algeria) Michaël Fabre	Clermont	Lens	Loan
16 July 2011	(France) Stéphane Dumont	Lille	AS Monaco	Free
16 July 2011	(Senegal) Papa Demba Camara	(Senegal) Étoile Lusitana	Sochaux	Undisclosed
18 July 2011	(France) Laurent Bonnart	AS Monaco	Lille	Free
18 July 2011	(Cameroon) Guy N'dy Assembé	Nantes	Nancy	Free
18 July 2011	(France) Luigi Pieroni	(Belgium) Standard Liège	Arles-Avignon	Free
19 July 2011	(France) Jessy Moulin	Saint-Étienne	Clermont	Loan
19 July 2011	(France) Johann Carrasso	Rennes	AS Monaco	Loan
19 July 2011	(France) Chris Mavinga	(England) Liverpool	Rennes	€2m
19 July 2011	(France) Sylvain Wiltord	Unattached	Nantes	Free
19 July 2011	(France) Fabrice Pancrate	(Greece) AEL	Nantes	Free
20 July 2011	(Ivory Coast) Freddy Drogba	Le Mans	Dijon	Free
20 July 2011	(France) Eric Marester	Troyes	AS Monaco	Free
21 July 2011	(France) Rudy Riou	(Belgium) Sporting Charleroi	Nantes	Free
21 July 2011	(Cameroon) Edgar Salli	(Cameroon) Sport de Garoua	AS Monaco	Undisclosed
22 July 2011	(Denmark) Daniel Wass	(Portugal) Benfica	Evian	Loan
22 July 2011	(France) Damien Tibéri	Sedan	Ajaccio	Free
22 July 2011	(France) Tripy Makonda	Paris Saint-Germain	Brest	€500k
22 July 2011	(Tunisia) Khaled Souissi	(Tunisia) Club Africain	Arles-Avignon	Free
22 July 2011	(Democratic Republic of the Congo) Distel Zola	AS Monaco	Nancy	Free
23 July 2011	(France) Léo Schwechlen	AS Monaco	Tours	Free
24 July 2011	(Mali) Mustapha Yatabaré	Boulogne	Guingamp	Free
25 July 2011	(France) Blaise Matuidi	Saint-Étienne	Paris Saint-Germain	€7.5m
25 July 2011	(Guinea-Bissau) Bocundji Ca	Nancy	Reims	Undisclosed
25 July 2011	(France) Jérémy Menez	(Italy) Roma	Paris Saint-Germain	€8m
25 July 2011	(France) Romain Inez	Caen	Châteauroux	Free
25 July 2011	(Serbia) Milan Biševac	Valenciennes	Paris Saint-Germain	Undisclosed
25 July 2011	(France) Jérémy Clément	Paris Saint-Germain	Saint-Étienne	Undisclosed
26 July 2011	(France) Fayçal Fajr	Fréjus Saint-Raphaël	Caen	Free
27 July 2011	(France) Olivier Veigneau	(Germany) MSV Duisburg	Nantes	Free
27 July 2011	(France) Hugo Cianci	Grenoble	Boulogne	Free
28 July 2011	(France) Ismaël Gace	Nice	Boulogne	Free
28 July 2011	(Mali) Mohamed Sissoko	(Italy) Juventus	Paris Saint-Germain	Undisclosed
28 July 2011	(Italy) Salvatore Sirigu	(Italy) Palermo	Paris Saint-Germain	Undisclosed
28 July 2011	(Brazil) Ilan Araújo	(Brazil) Internacional	Ajaccio	Free
28 July 2011	(Japan) Daisuke Matsui	Grenoble	Dijon	Free
1 August 2011	(Senegal) Jackson Mendy	Grenoble	Ajaccio	Free
1 August 2011	(Mali) Mahamane Traoré	Nice	Metz	Loan
1 August 2011	(Senegal) Ibrahima Ba	(Tunisia) Stade Tunisien	Istres	Free
1 August 2011	(France) Thibault Moulin	Caen	Châteauroux	Loan
2 August 2011	(France) Jean-Pascal Mignot	Auxerre	Saint-Étienne	€1.5m
2 August 2011	(Brazil) Vitorino Hilton	Marseille	Montpellier	Free
3 August 2011	(France) Julien Outrebon	Strasbourg	Troyes	Free
3 August 2011	(France) Cyriaque Louvion	Le Mans	Le Havre	Free
3 August 2011	(France) Steed Malbranque	(England) Sunderland	Saint-Étienne	Free
4 August 2011	(Cameroon) Charley Fomen	Marseille	Clermont	Free
4 August 2011	(France) Fabrice Abriel	Marseille	Nice	Free
4 August 2011	(Venezuela) Gabriel Cichero	(Venezuela) Caracas	Lens	Free
6 August 2011	(Argentina) Javier Pastore	(Italy) Palermo	Paris Saint-Germain	€42m
9 August 2011	(France) Ludovic Giuly	Paris Saint-Germain	AS Monaco	Free
9 August 2011	(France) Toifilou Maoulida	Lens	Bastia	Free
9 August 2011	(Algeria) Kamel Ghilas	(England) Hull City	Reims	Loan
9 August 2011	(France) Kévin Diaz	AS Monaco	Metz	Loan
10 August 2011	(France) Fabien Lemoine	Rennes	Saint-Étienne	Undisclosed
11 August 2011	(French Polynesia) Marama Vahirua	Nancy	AS Monaco	Loan
12 August 2011	(France) Joan Hartock	Lyon	Brest	Free
12 August 2011	(Burkina Faso) Bakary Koné	Guingamp	Lyon	€2m
15 August 2011	(Cameroon) Benjamin Moukandjo	AS Monaco	Nancy	Undisclosed
26 August 2011	(Ivory Coast) Franck Dja Djedje	Arles-Avignon	Nice	Free
27 August 2011	(Uruguay) Diego Lugano	(Turkey) Fenerbahçe	Paris Saint-Germain	€3m
29 August 2011	(Venezuela) Yonathan del Valle	(Venezuela) Deportivo Táchira	Auxerre	Loan
29 August 2011	(Democratic Republic of the Congo) Cédric Mongongu	AS Monaco	Evian	Free
29 August 2011	(France) Enzo Reale	Lyon	Boulogne	Loan
29 August 2011	(Haiti) Jean-Eudes Maurice	Paris Saint-Germain	Lens	Loan
29 August 2011	(Togo) Floyd Ayité	Bordeaux	Angers	Loan
30 August 2011	(France) Lionel Carole	(Portugal) Benfica	Sedan	Loan
30 August 2011	(Ivory Coast) Modibo Diarra	(United Arab Emirates) Al-Wahda	Le Mans	Undisclosed
30 August 2011	(Central African Republic) Hilaire Momi	(Cameroon) Coton Sport	Le Mans	Undisclosed
30 August 2011	(France) Raphaël Caceres	Dijon	Troyes	Loan
30 August 2011	(France) Damien Marcq	Caen	Dijon	Loan
30 August 2011	(France) Mouhamadou Dabo	(Spain) Sevilla	Lyon	€800k
30 August 2011	(Poland) Ireneusz Jelen	Auxerre	Lille	Free
30 August 2011	(Ivory Coast) Max Gradel	(England) Leeds United	Saint-Étienne	Undisclosed
30 August 2011	(Romania) Bănel Nicoliţă	(Romania) Steaua București	Saint-Étienne	Undisclosed
30 August 2011	(Morocco) Youssouf Hadji	Nancy	Rennes	Undisclosed
30 August 2011	(France) Thomas Mangani	AS Monaco	Nancy	Loan
30 August 2011	(Romania) Daniel Niculae	AS Monaco	Nancy	Loan
31 August 2011	(Denmark) Christian Poulsen	(England) Liverpool	Evian	Loan
31 August 2011	(France) Abdoul Camara	Rennes	Sochaux	Undisclosed
31 August 2011	(France) Laurent Agouazi	Boulogne	Istres	Free
31 August 2011	(Switzerland) Innocent Emeghara	(Switzerland) Grasshopper Zürich	Lorient	Undisclosed
31 August 2011	(France) Yohann Thuram-Ulien	AS Monaco	Troyes	Undisclosed
31 August 2011	(France) Harry Novillo	Lyon	Le Havre	Loan
31 August 2011	(England) Joe Cole	(England) Liverpool	Lille	Loan
31 August 2011	(France) Gilles Sunu	(England) Arsenal	Lorient	Undisclosed
31 August 2011	(Costa Rica) Joel Campbell	(England) Arsenal	Lorient	Loan
31 August 2011	(Nigeria) Rabiu Afolabi	(Austria) Red Bull Salzburg	AS Monaco	Undisclosed
31 August 2011	(Mali) Sambou Yatabaré	Caen	AS Monaco	Undisclosed
31 August 2011	(France) Granddi Ngoyi	Paris Saint-Germain	Nantes	Loan
31 August 2011	(France) Gueïda Fofana	Le Havre	Lyon	€1.8m
31 August 2011	(France) Lynel Kitambala	Lorient	Saint-Étienne	Undisclosed
1 September 2011	(France) Frédéric Duplus	Sochaux	Guingamp	Loan

- ^1 Player who signs with a club before the transfer window opened in June 2011 officially joined his new club on 1 July 2011, while a player who joins after the open of the transfer window will join his new club following his signature of the contract.
