= Ruffy =

Ruffy may refer to:

== Culture ==
- Ruffy and the Riverside, a 2025 video game

== Places ==
- Ruffy, Victoria, a town in Victoria, Australia
- Ruffy Brook, a stream in Minnesota

== Given name or ring name ==
- Ruffy Biazon (born 1969), Filipino politician, Mayor of Muntinlupa
- Ruffy Silverstein (American wrestler) (1914–1980) American professional and amateur wrestler
- Ruffy Silverstein (Canadian wrestler) (born 1972), Canadian professional wrestler

== Surname ==
- Eugène Ruffy (1854–1919), Swiss politician
- Maurício Ruffy (born 1996), Brazilian mixed martial artist
- Victor Ruffy (1823–1869), Swiss politician

== See also ==
- Jacques Ruffié (1921–2004), French haematologist, geneticist, and anthropologist
- Ruffie or ruffies, street names for the drug Flunitrazepam
- Rufy, a character in the Japanese anime metaseries Gall Force
