= List of English football transfers summer 2011 =

This is a list of English football transfers for the 2011 summer transfer window. Only moves featuring at least one Premier League or Championship club are listed.

The summer transfer window began once clubs had concluded their final domestic fixture of the 2010–11 season (only for teams in the same association), but many transfers only officially went through on 1 July because the majority of player contracts finished on 30 June. The window remained open until 23:00 BST on 31 August 2011. Transfers between English and foreign clubs could only be made from 9 June 2011 onward.

== Transfers ==
All players and clubs without a flag are English.

Date	Name	Moving from	Moving to	Fee
2 February 2011	Danzelle St. Louis-Hamilton	Stoke City	Darlington	Non-contract
7 February 2011	Ben Gordon	Chelsea	Scunthorpe United	Loan
8 February 2011	Gary Borrowdale	Queens Park Rangers	Carlisle United	Loan
9 February 2011	(United States) Eric Lichaj	Aston Villa	Leeds United	Loan
9 February 2011	(Scotland) Iain Turner	Everton	Preston North End	Loan
10 February 2011	Waide Fairhurst	Doncaster Rovers	Hereford United	Loan
10 February 2011	Antonio German	Queens Park Rangers	Yeovil Town	Loan
10 February 2011	(Scotland) Stephen Hughes	Norwich City	Milton Keynes Dons	Loan
10 February 2011	(Finland) Shefki Kuqi	Unattached	Newcastle United	Free
10 February 2011	Sam Winnall	Wolverhampton Wanderers	Burton Albion	Loan
11 February 2011	(Spain) Daniel Ayala	Liverpool	Derby County	Loan
11 February 2011	(Netherlands) Jeffrey Bruma	Chelsea	Leicester City	Loan
11 February 2011	(Republic of Ireland) Conor Clifford	Chelsea	Notts County	Loan
11 February 2011	(Scotland) Kevin McDonald	Burnley	Notts County	Loan
14 February 2011	Kieran Djilali	Crystal Palace	Chesterfield	Loan
14 February 2011	Mason Springthorpe	Shrewsbury Town	Everton	£125k
15 February 2011	Jack Hobbs	Leicester City	Hull City	Loan
15 February 2011	(Norway) Bjørn Helge Riise	Fulham	Sheffield United	Loan
15 February 2011	(Wales) Sam Vokes	Wolverhampton Wanderers	Sheffield United	Loan
16 February 2011	(South Africa) Kagisho Dikgacoi	Fulham	Crystal Palace	Loan
16 February 2011	(Republic of Ireland) Paul McShane	Hull City	Barnsley	Loan
16 February 2011	(Northern Ireland) Jamie Ward	Sheffield United	Derby County	Loan
17 February 2011	(Wales) David Cotterill	(Wales) Swansea City	Portsmouth	Loan
17 February 2011	(Jamaica) Jason Euell	Blackpool	Doncaster Rovers	Loan
17 February 2011	Julian Kelly	Reading	Lincoln City	Loan
17 February 2011	Sam Mantom	West Bromwich Albion	Oldham Athletic	Loan
18 February 2011	Andrew Davies	Stoke City	Middlesbrough	Loan
18 February 2011	(Republic of Ireland) Conrad Logan	Leicester City	Bristol Rovers	Loan
18 February 2011	(Scotland) Robbie Neilson	Leicester City	Brentford	Loan
18 February 2011	James Shea	Arsenal	Southampton	Loan
19 February 2011	(Belgium) Franck Moussa	Leicester City	Doncaster Rovers	Loan
21 February 2011	(Wales) Rob Edwards	Blackpool	Norwich City	Loan
21 February 2011	Adam Reed	Sunderland	Brentford	Loan
22 February 2011	Theo Robinson	Millwall	Derby County	Loan
23 February 2011	Calum Flanagan	Aston Villa	Kettering Town	Loan
23 February 2011	(Republic of Ireland) Rob Kiernan	Watford	Wycombe Wanderers	Loan
24 February 2011	(United States) Mike Grella	Leeds United	Swindon Town	Loan
24 February 2011	(Sweden) Johan Hammar	Unattached	Everton	Free
25 February 2011	Michael Boulding	Unattached	Derby County	Free
25 February 2011	Frank Fielding	Blackburn Rovers	Derby County	Loan
25 February 2011	Martin Rowlands	Queens Park Rangers	Millwall	Loan
25 February 2011^{1}	(Wales) Adam Matthews	(Wales) Cardiff City	(Scotland) Celtic	Free
26 February 2011	Marlon Harewood	Blackpool	Barnsley	Loan
28 February 2011	David Amoo	Liverpool	Hull City	Loan
2 March 2011	(Republic of Ireland) Mark Byrne	Nottingham Forest	Barnet	Loan
2 March 2011	Matthew Parsons	Crystal Palace	Barnet	Loan
3 March 2011	(Wales) Jason Brown	Blackburn Rovers	(Wales) Cardiff City	Loan
3 March 2011	Jordan Spence	West Ham United	Bristol City	Loan
4 March 2011	Ben Pringle	Derby County	Torquay United	Loan
4 March 2011	(Northern Ireland) Ivan Sproule	Bristol City	Notts County	Loan
5 March 2011	(Finland) Lauri Dalla Valle	Fulham	AFC Bournemouth	Loan
7 March 2011	(Scotland) Barry Bannan	Aston Villa	Leeds United	Loan
7 March 2011	Jamie Reckord	Wolverhampton Wanderers	Northampton Town	Loan
7 March 2011	Andros Townsend	Tottenham Hotspur	Millwall	Loan
8 March 2011	(Netherlands) Kemy Agustien	(Wales) Swansea City	Crystal Palace	Loan
8 March 2011	(Scotland) Kris Boyd	Middlesbrough	Nottingham Forest	Loan
8 March 2011	Nathan Delfouneso	Aston Villa	Burnley	Loan
8 March 2011	Neil Etheridge	Fulham	Charlton Athletic	Loan
8 March 2011	(Jamaica) Ricardo Gardner	Bolton Wanderers	Preston North End	Loan
8 March 2011	Paul Smith	Nottingham Forest	Middlesbrough	Loan
8 March 2011	Nialle Rodney	Nottingham Forest	Burton Albion	Loan
10 March 2011	Calvin Andrew	Crystal Palace	Swindon Town	Loan
10 March 2011	(Republic of Ireland) Ronan Murray	Ipswich Town	Torquay United	Loan
11 March 2011	Kieron Dyer	West Ham United	Ipswich Town	Loan
11 March 2011	Dean Parrett	Tottenham Hotspur	Charlton Athletic	Loan
12 March 2011	Frank Nouble	West Ham United	Charlton Athletic	Loan
14 March 2011	Richard Eckersley	Burnley	Bury	Loan
14 March 2011	(Germany) Jeffrey Schlupp	Leicester City	Brentford	Loan
15 March 2011	(France) Alassane N'Diaye	Crystal Palace	Swindon Town	Loan
15 March 2011	Danny Ward	Bolton Wanderers	Huddersfield Town	Loan
16 March 2011	Danny Batth	Wolverhampton Wanderers	Sheffield Wednesday	Loan
17 March 2011	(Nigeria) Hope Akpan	Everton	Hull City	Loan
17 March 2011	Zac Aley	Blackburn Rovers	Morecambe	Loan
17 March 2011	(Italy) Fabio Borini	Chelsea	(Wales) Swansea City	Loan
17 March 2011	Ryan Burge	Doncaster Rovers	Oxford United	Loan
17 March 2011	Rob Jones	Scunthorpe United	Sheffield Wednesday	Loan
17 March 2011	(Germany) Jens Lehmann	Unattached	Arsenal	Free
17 March 2011	(Wales) Shaun MacDonald	(Wales) Swansea City	Yeovil Town	Loan
17 March 2011	Jonathan Obika	Tottenham Hotspur	Yeovil Town	Loan
17 March 2011	(New Zealand) Tommy Smith	Ipswich Town	Colchester United	Loan
17 March 2011	John Sullivan	Millwall	Charlton Athletic	Loan
17 March 2011	Byron Webster	Doncaster Rovers	Northampton Town	Loan
18 March 2011	(France) Jean-Yves Mvoto	Sunderland	Oldham Athletic	Loan
21 March 2011	(Senegal) Diomansy Kamara	Fulham	Leicester City	Loan
22 March 2011	Niall Canavan	Scunthorpe United	Shrewsbury Town	Loan
22 March 2011	Cameron Lancaster	Tottenham Hotspur	Dagenham & Redbridge	Loan
22 March 2011^{1}	Myles Anderson	(Scotland) Aberdeen	Blackburn Rovers	Free
23 March 2011	(Scotland) Marc Laird	Millwall	Walsall	Loan
23 March 2011	Sean Morrison	Reading	Huddersfield Town	Loan
24 March 2011	(Northern Ireland) Trevor Carson	Sunderland	Brentford	Loan
24 March 2011	Adam Clayton	Leeds United	Milton Keynes Dons	Loan
24 March 2011	Jordan Cook	Sunderland	Walsall	Loan
24 March 2011	(Republic of Ireland) Shane Duffy	Everton	Burnley	Loan
24 March 2011	(Australia) Brad Jones	Liverpool	Derby County	Loan
24 March 2011	(South Africa) Bongani Khumalo	Tottenham Hotspur	Preston North End	Loan
24 March 2011	(Bermuda) Reggie Lambe	Ipswich Town	Bristol Rovers	Loan
24 March 2011	Olly Lee	West Ham United	Dagenham & Redbridge	Loan
24 March 2011	Jake Livermore	Tottenham Hotspur	Leeds United	Loan
24 March 2011	Jason Lowe	Blackburn Rovers	Oldham Athletic	Loan
24 March 2011	Tom Kilbey	Portsmouth	Lincoln City	Loan
24 March 2011	Gavin Mahon	Queens Park Rangers	Crystal Palace	Loan
24 March 2011	(Republic of Ireland) Donal McDermott	Manchester City	AFC Bournemouth	Loan
24 March 2011	Lee Nicholls	Wigan Athletic	Sheffield Wednesday	Loan
24 March 2011	(Honduras) Ramón Núñez	Leeds United	Scunthorpe United	Loan
24 March 2011	(Republic of Ireland) Joey O'Brien	Bolton Wanderers	Sheffield Wednesday	Loan
24 March 2011	(Spain) Daniel Pacheco	Liverpool	Norwich City	Loan
24 March 2011	Elliot Parish	Aston Villa	Lincoln City	Loan
24 March 2011	Tom Parkes	Leicester City	Burton Albion	Loan
24 March 2011	(Hungary) Tamás Priskin	Ipswich Town	(Wales) Swansea City	Loan
24 March 2011	(Trinidad and Tobago) Jlloyd Samuel	Bolton Wanderers	(Wales) Cardiff City	Loan
24 March 2011	(Wales) Sam Vokes	Wolverhampton Wanderers	Norwich City	Loan
24 March 2011	Marcus Williams	Reading	Scunthorpe United	Loan
25 March 2011	Elliott Cox	Queens Park Rangers	Histon	Loan
25 March 2011	Wes Foderingham	Crystal Palace	Histon	Loan
25 March 2011	Jack Holland	Crystal Palace	Eastbourne Borough	Loan
25 March 2011	Cauley Woodrow	Luton Town	Fulham	Loan
30 March 2011	Pat O'Connor	Millwall	Lewes	Loan
15 April 2011^{1}	Dan Burn	Darlington	Fulham	Undisclosed
15 April 2011	Richard Eckersley	Burnley	(Canada) Major League Soccer (Toronto FC)	Loan
15 April 2011^{1}	Nathan Luscombe	Sunderland	Hartlepool United	Undisclosed
9 May 2011^{1}	Ryan Allsop	West Bromwich Albion	Millwall	Undisclosed
9 May 2011	Frank Fielding	Blackburn Rovers	Derby County	Undisclosed
9 May 2011^{1}	Theo Robinson	Millwall	Derby County	Undisclosed
9 May 2011	(Northern Ireland) Jamie Ward	Sheffield United	Derby County	Undisclosed
10 May 2011	(Northern Ireland) Joe Dudgeon	Manchester United	Hull City	Undisclosed
12 May 2011	Alex Billington	Unattached	Preston North End	Free
12 May 2011	(Northern Ireland) Corry Evans	Manchester United	Hull City	Undisclosed
12 May 2011	Curtis Main	Unattached	Middlesbrough	Free
13 May 2011	(Peru) Nolberto Solano	Hull City	Hartlepool United	Free
13 May 2011	James Poole	Manchester City	Hartlepool United	Undisclosed
17 May 2011	Luke Dobie	Everton	Middlesbrough	Free
17 May 2011	Josh Egan	Cheltenham Town	Blackpool	Free
17 May 2011	Byron Webster	Doncaster Rovers	Northampton Town	Free
18 May 2011^{1}	(Northern Ireland) Ivan Sproule	Bristol City	(Scotland) Hibernian	Free
19 May 2011	Tom Eastman	Ipswich Town	Colchester United	Free
19 May 2011	(Republic of Ireland) Alex O'Hanlon	(Republic of Ireland) St. Kevin's	Liverpool	Undisclosed
23 May 2011	(Northern Ireland) Gareth McAuley	Ipswich Town	West Bromwich Albion	Free
23 May 2011	Marlon Pack	Portsmouth	Cheltenham Town	Free
23 May 2011	(Spain) Denis Suárez	(Spain) Celta Vigo	Manchester City	£850k
24 May 2011	Rob Jones	Scunthorpe United	Sheffield Wednesday	Free
24 May 2011	Glenn Murray	Brighton & Hove Albion	Crystal Palace	Free
24 May 2011	(Republic of Ireland) Willo Flood	Middlesbrough	(Scotland) Dundee United	Free
26 May 2011	Liam Henderson	Watford	York City	Free
26 May 2011^{1}	(Antigua and Barbuda) Mikele Leigertwood	Queens Park Rangers	Reading	Undisclosed
26 May 2011	(Spain) Héctor Bellerín	(Spain) Barcelona	Arsenal	Free
26 May 2011	(Spain) Jon Toral	(Spain) Barcelona	Arsenal	Free
26 May 2011^{1}	(Norway) Tom Skogsrud	Manchester City	(Scotland) Rangers	Free
26 May 2011^{1}	(Norway) Kim Skogsrud	Manchester City	(Scotland) Rangers	Free
27 May 2011	John Akinde	Bristol City	Crawley Town	Free
27 May 2011	Ishmel Demontagnac	Blackpool	Notts County	Free
27 May 2011	James Vaughan	Everton	Norwich City	Undisclosed
30 May 2011	(Sweden) Johan Elmander	Bolton Wanderers	(Turkey) Galatasaray	Free
31 May 2011	Michael Mancienne	Chelsea	(Germany) Hamburger SV	£1.75m
31 May 2011	John Sullivan	Millwall	Charlton Athletic	Free
1 June 2011	(Republic of Ireland) Scott Davies	Reading	Crawley Town	Free
1 June 2011	(Scotland) Steven Thompson	Burnley	(Scotland) St Mirren	Free
3 June 2011	Billy Jones	Preston North End	West Bromwich Albion	Free
3 June 2011	Ben Pringle	Derby County	Rotherham United	Free
3 June 2011	(Italy) Jacopo Sala	Chelsea	(Germany) Hamburger SV	Undisclosed
3 June 2011^{1}	(United States) Brad Friedel	Aston Villa	Tottenham Hotspur	Free
6 June 2011	(Democratic Republic of the Congo) Yannick Bolasie	Plymouth Argyle	Bristol City	Undisclosed
6 June 2011	Will Buckley	Watford	Brighton & Hove Albion	£1m
6 June 2011	(Wales) Steve Morison	Millwall	Norwich City	Undisclosed
6 June 2011	(Turkey) Gökhan Töre	Chelsea	(Germany) Hamburger SV	Undisclosed
7 June 2011	Danny Graham	Watford	(Wales) Swansea City	£3.5m
7 June 2011^{1}	David Perkins	Colchester United	Barnsley	Free
8 June 2011^{1}	(Scotland) Chris Burke	(Wales) Cardiff City	Birmingham City	Free
8 June 2011	(Finland) Carl Jenkinson	Charlton Athletic	Arsenal	Undisclosed
9 June 2011	(Scotland) Craig Bryson	(Scotland) Kilmarnock	Derby County	Undisclosed
9 June 2011	(Egypt) Ahmed Elmohamady	(Egypt) ENPPI	Sunderland	Undisclosed
9 June 2011	Neil Harris	Millwall	Southend United	Free
9 June 2011	Jordan Henderson	Sunderland	Liverpool	Undisclosed
10 June 2011	Michael Chopra	(Wales) Cardiff City	Ipswich Town	£1.5m
10 June 2011	(France) Yohan Cabaye	(France) Lille	Newcastle United	Undisclosed
10 June 2011	(Jamaica) Marlon King	Coventry City	Birmingham City	Free
12 June 2011	Nathan Tyson	Unattached	Derby County	Free
13 June 2011	(Iceland) Ívar Ingimarsson	Unattached	Ipswich Town	Free
13 June 2011	Scott Donnelly	(Wales) Swansea City	Wycombe	Loan
13 June 2011	Phil Jones	Blackburn Rovers	Manchester United	Undisclosed
14 June 2011	(Nigeria) Hope Akpan	Everton	Crawley Town	Free
14 June 2011	Elliott Bennett	Brighton & Hove Albion	Norwich City	Undisclosed
14 June 2011	(Senegal) Abdoulaye Faye	Unattached	West Ham United	Free
14 June 2011	Craig King	Leicester City	AFC Telford United	Free
15 June 2011	David Norris	Ipswich Town	Portsmouth	Free
15 June 2011	(Scotland) Garry O'Connor	Barnsley	(Scotland) Hibernian	Free
16 June 2011	(Portugal) Bébé	Manchester United	(Turkey) Beşiktaş	Loan
16 June 2011	(Senegal) Morgaro Gomis	(Scotland) Dundee United	Birmingham City	Free
16 June 2011	Kevin Nolan	Newcastle United	West Ham United	Undisclosed
17 June 2011	(Senegal) Demba Ba	West Ham United	Newcastle United	Free
17 June 2011	Lee Brown	Queens Park Rangers	Bristol Rovers	Free
17 June 2011	(Republic of Ireland) Mark Byrne	Nottingham Forest	Barnet	Free
17 June 2011	(Belgium) Ritchie De Laet	Manchester United	Norwich City	Loan
18 June 2011^{1}	(France) Sylvain Marveaux	(France) Rennes	Newcastle United	Free
20 June 2011	Ryan Taylor	Rotherham United	Bristol City	Tribunal
20 June 2011	(Czech Republic) Jan Šebek	Chelsea	(Czech Republic) Baumit Jablonec	Free
21 June 2011	(Scotland) Tom Aldred	Watford	(Scotland) Inverness Caledonian Thistle	Loan
21 June 2011	(Portugal) Manuel Da Costa	West Ham United	(Russia) Lokomotiv Moscow	Undisclosed
21 June 2011	Matt Done	Rochdale	Barnsley	Undisclosed
21 June 2011	Nathan Ellington	Watford	Ipswich Town	Free
21 June 2011	(Scotland) Craig Forsyth	(Scotland) Dundee	Watford	Undisclosed
21 June 2011	Ashley Grimes	Millwall	Rochdale	Free
21 June 2011	Jamie O'Hara	Tottenham Hotspur	Wolverhampton Wanderers	£5m
21 June 2011	(France) Therry Racon	Charlton Athletic	Millwall	Free
21 June 2011	Jason Shackell	Barnsley	Derby County	Undisclosed
22 June 2011	Kieran Agard	Everton	Yeovil Town	Free
22 June 2011	(Netherlands) Dorus de Vries	(Wales) Swansea City	Wolverhampton Wanderers	Free
22 June 2011^{1}	(Sweden) Sebastian Larsson	Birmingham City	Sunderland	Free
22 June 2011	Lee Peltier	Huddersfield Town	Leicester City	Undisclosed
22 June 2011^{1}	(Republic of Ireland) Keiren Westwood	Coventry City	Sunderland	Free
23 June 2011	(Scotland) Craig Conway	(Scotland) Dundee United	(Wales) Cardiff City	Free
23 June 2011	Ben Tozer	Newcastle United	Northampton Town	Free
23 June 2011	Ashley Young	Aston Villa	Manchester United	Undisclosed
23 June 2011	Paul Rachubka	Blackpool	Leeds United	Free
24 June 2011	Paul Jones	Exeter City	Peterborough United	Free
24 June 2011	(Scotland) Jimmy McNulty	Brighton & Hove Albion	Barnsley	Undisclosed
24 June 2011	Andrew Tutte	Manchester City	Rochdale	Free
24 June 2011	Jason Pearce	AFC Bournemouth	Portsmouth	Undisclosed
24 June 2011	Mark Randall	Arsenal	Chesterfield	Free
24 June 2011	Shaleum Logan	Manchester City	Brentford	Free
24 June 2011	(Australia) Neil Kilkenny	Leeds United	Bristol City	Free
24 June 2011	Scott Wiseman	Rochdale	Barnsley	Free
24 June 2011	Miles Addison	Derby County	Barnsley	Loan
24 June 2011	(Czech Republic) Radoslav Kováč	West Ham United	(Switzerland) Basel	Undisclosed
25 June 2011	Scott Kay	Manchester City	Macclesfield Town	Free
27 June 2011^{1}	Neil Danns	Unattached	Leicester City	Free
27 June 2011	(Denmark) Kasper Schmeichel	Leeds United	Leicester City	Undisclosed
27 June 2011	Mat Sadler	Watford	Walsall	Free
28 June 2011	Darryl Flahavan	Portsmouth	AFC Bournemouth	Free
28 June 2011	Daniel Leadbitter	Newcastle United	Torquay United	Free
28 June 2011	Tommy Spurr	Sheffield Wednesday	Doncaster Rovers	Undisclosed
28 June 2011	(Ghana) Mohammed Abu	Manchester City	(Norway) Strømsgodset	Loan
28 June 2011	Joe Oastler	Queens Park Rangers	Torquay United	Free
29 June 2011^{1}	(Spain) David de Gea	(Spain) Atlético Madrid	Manchester United	Undisclosed
29 June 2011	(Sweden) Bojan Djordjic	(Hungary) Videoton	Blackpool	Free
29 June 2011	Darius Henderson	Sheffield United	Millwall	Undisclosed
29 June 2011	(Scotland) Chris Maguire	(Scotland) Aberdeen	Derby County	Undisclosed
29 June 2011	Connor Wickham	Ipswich Town	Sunderland	£8.1m
29 June 2011	(Republic of Ireland) Adam Rooney	(Scotland) Inverness Caledonian Thistle	Birmingham City	Free
29 June 2011	(France) Steven Mouyokolo	Wolverhampton Wanderers	(France) Sochaux Montbéliard	Loan
29 June 2011	Michael Kay	Sunderland	Tranmere Rovers	Free
29 June 2011	(Northern Ireland) Robbie Weir	Sunderland	Tranmere Rovers	Free
29 June 2011	Danny Coid	Blackpool	Accrington Stanley	Free
29 June 2011	(Wales) Arron Davies	Peterborough United	Northampton Town	Free
29 June 2011	(Colombia) David González	Manchester City	(Scotland) Aberdeen	Loan
30 June 2011	(Nigeria) Dele Adebola	Nottingham Forest	Hull City	Free
30 June 2011	(Netherlands) Jeffrey Bruma	Chelsea	(Germany) Hamburger SV	Loan
30 June 2011	Chris Dunn	Northampton Town	Coventry City	Undisclosed
30 June 2011	Craig Gardner	Birmingham City	Sunderland	£6m
30 June 2011	Jack Hobbs	Leicester City	Hull City	£850k
30 June 2011	(Republic of Ireland) Joe Murphy	Scunthorpe United	Coventry City	Free
30 June 2011	(France) Jean-Yves Mvoto	Sunderland	Oldham Athletic	Free
30 June 2011	Isaac Osbourne	Covnetry City	(Scotland) Aberdeen	Free
30 June 2011	(South Korea) Ji Dong-won	(South Korea) Chunnam Dragons	Sunderland	Undisclosed
30 June 2011	(France) Alassane N'Diaye	Crystal Palace	Southend United	Loan
30 June 2011	Luke O'Neill	Leicester City	Mansfield Town	Free
1 July 2011	(Algeria) Mehdi Abeid	(France) Lens	Newcastle United	Free
1 July 2011	Kyle Bennett	Bury	Doncaster Rovers	Undisclosed
1 July 2011	James Baxendale	Leeds United	Doncaster Rovers	Free
1 July 2011	(Netherlands) Roland Bergkamp	(Netherlands) Excelsior	Brighton & Hove Albion	Undisclosed
1 July 2011	(Wales) Troy Brown	Ipswich Town	Rotherham United	Free
1 July 2011	Scott Carson	West Bromwich Albion	(Turkey) Bursaspor	Undisclosed
1 July 2011	Steven Caulker	Tottenham Hotspur	(Wales) Swansea City	Loan
1 July 2011	(Scotland) Don Cowie	Watford	(Wales) Cardiff City	Free
1 July 2011	Aaron Cresswell	Tranmere Rovers	Ipswich Town	Undisclosed
1 July 2011	(Wales) Rob Edwards	Blackpool	Barnsley	Free
1 July 2011	Andy Frampton	Millwall	Gillingham	Undisclosed
1 July 2011	Oscar Gobern	Southampton	Huddersfield Town	Free
1 July 2011	Kingsley James	Sheffield United	Port Vale	Free
1 July 2011	Bradley Johnson	Leeds United	Norwich City	Free
1 July 2011	Adam Legzdins	Burton Albion	Derby County	Undisclosed
1 July 2011	(Republic of Ireland) Donal McDermott	Manchester City	Huddersfield Town	Free
1 July 2011	Paul McKenna	Nottingham Forest	Hull City	Free
1 July 2011	(Northern Ireland) Patrick McLaughlin	Newcastle United	York City	Free
1 July 2011	Danny Philliskirk	Chelsea	Sheffield United	Free
1 July 2011	Darren Pratley	(Wales) Swansea City	Bolton Wanderers	Free
1 July 2011	(Republic of Ireland) Andy Reid	Blackpool	Nottingham Forest	Free
1 July 2011	Phil Roe	Sheffield United	Port Vale	Free
1 July 2011	Ryan Tunnicliffe	Manchester United	Peterborough United	Loan
1 July 2011	(Spain) Borja Valero	West Bromwich Albion	(Spain) Villarreal	Undisclosed
1 July 2011	Chris Whelpdale	Peterborough United	Gillingham	Undisclosed
2 July 2011	Roarie Deacon	Arsenal	Sunderland	Free
3 July 2011	(Turkey) Nadir Çiftçi	Portsmouth	(Turkey) Kayserispor	Free
4 July 2011	(Oman) Ali Al-Habsi	Bolton Wanderers	Wigan Athletic	£4m
4 July 2011	(France) Gaël Clichy	Arsenal	Manchester City	£7m
4 July 2011	Eric Dier	(Portugal) Sporting CP	Everton	Loan
4 July 2011	(South Africa) Kagisho Dikgacoi	Fulham	Crystal Palace	Undisclosed
4 July 2011	(Scotland) Craig Mackail-Smith	Peterborough United	Brighton & Hove Albion	Undisclosed
4 July 2011	David Mirfin	Scunthorpe United	Watford	Free
4 July 2011	(Republic of Ireland) Sean St Ledger	Preston North End	Leicester City	Undisclosed
4 July 2011	Andrew Taylor	Middlesbrough	(Wales) Cardiff City	Free
4 July 2011	Josh Meekings	Ipswich Town	(Scotland) Inverness Caledonian Thistle	Free
5 July 2011	Nicky Ajose	Manchester United	Peterborough United	Undisclosed
5 July 2011	Julian Bennett	Nottingham Forest	Sheffield Wednesday	Free
5 July 2011	(Republic of Ireland) Stephen Henderson	Bristol City	Portsmouth	Free
5 July 2011	Charlie Lee	Peterborough United	Gillingham	Undisclosed
5 July 2011	David Nugent	Unattached	Leicester City	Free
6 July 2011	Adam Barrett	Crystal Palace	AFC Bournemouth	Undisclosed
6 July 2011	Stephen Darby	Liverpool	Rochdale	Loan
6 July 2011	(Wales) Robert Earnshaw	Nottingham Forest	(Wales) Cardiff City	Free
6 July 2011	(Republic of Ireland) Anthony Pilkington	Huddersfield Town	Norwich City	Undisclosed
6 July 2011	(Paraguay) Cristian Riveros	Sunderland	(Turkey) Kayserispor	Loan
6 July 2011	(Montenegro) Stefan Savić	(Serbia) Partizan	Manchester City	Undisclosed
6 July 2011	Luke Varney	Derby County	Portsmouth	£750k
7 July 2011	(Scotland) Charlie Adam	Blackpool	Liverpool	Undisclosed
7 July 2011	Craig Alcock	Yeovil Town	Peterborough United	Undisclosed
7 July 2011	Wes Brown	Manchester United	Sunderland	Undisclosed
7 July 2011	(Scotland) Steven Caldwell	Wigan Athletic	Birmingham City	Free
7 July 2011	Jack Cork	Chelsea	Southampton	£750k
7 July 2011	Matthew Mills	Reading	Leicester City	£5m
7 July 2011	Jordan Stewart	Unattached	Millwall	Free
7 July 2011	(Republic of Ireland) John O'Shea	Manchester United	Sunderland	Undisclosed
8 July 2011	(Scotland) Kris Boyd	Middlesbrough	(Turkey) Eskişehirspor	Undisclosed
8 July 2011	(Scotland) Liam Cooper	Hull City	Huddersfield Town	Loan
8 July 2011	(Iceland) Aron Gunnarsson	Coventry City	(Wales) Cardiff City	Free
8 July 2011	(Portugal) José Moreira	(Portugal) Benfica	(Wales) Swansea City	Undisclosed
8 July 2011	(Hungary) Csaba Somogyi	(Hungary) Rákospalotai	Fulham	Free
8 July 2011	(Wales) David Vaughan	Unattached	Sunderland	Free
9 July 2011	Matt Hill	Unattached	Blackpool	Free
10 July 2011	Lee Bowyer	Unattached	Ipswich Town	Free
10 July 2011	(Republic of Ireland) Joe Mason	Plymouth Argyle	(Wales) Cardiff City	£250k
10 July 2011	Kevin Phillips	Unattached	Blackpool	Free
10 July 2011	(Netherlands) Gianni Zuiverloon	West Bromwich Albion	(Spain) Real Mallorca	Undisclosed
10 July 2011	(Brazil) Wellington Silva	Arsenal	(Spain) Levante	Loan
11 July 2011	(Republic of Ireland) Cian Bolger	Leicester City	Bristol Rovers	Loan
11 July 2011	Michael Brown	Unattached	Leeds United	Free
11 July 2011	(Spain) Cristian Ceballos	Unattached	Tottenham Hotspur	Free
11 July 2011	(Ivory Coast) Gervinho	(France) Lille	Arsenal	Undisclosed
11 July 2011	Greg Halford	Wolverhampton Wanderers	Portsmouth	Undisclosed
11 July 2011	(Australia) Mile Jedinak	Unattached	Crystal Palace	Free
11 July 2011	Marc Laird	Millwall	Leyton Orient	Undisclosed
11 July 2011	Richard Naylor	Unattached	Doncaster Rovers	Free
11 July 2011	Sam Walker	Chelsea	Northampton Town	Loan
11 July 2011	Jonathan Woodgate	Unattached	Stoke City	Free
11 July 2011	Danny Ward	Bolton Wanderers	Huddersfield Town	Undisclosed
12 July 2011	(France) Didier Digard	Middlesbrough	(France) Nice	Undisclosed
12 July 2011	(Republic of Ireland) Conrad Logan	Leicester City	Rotherham United	Loan
12 July 2011	John Nolan	Everton	Stockport County	Free
13 July 2011	Jay Bothroyd	Unattached	Queens Park Rangers	Free
13 July 2011	Kieron Dyer	Unattached	Queens Park Rangers	Free
13 July 2011	Paul Konchesky	Liverpool	Leicester City	Undisclosed
13 July 2011	(Norway) John Arne Riise	(Italy) Roma	Fulham	Undisclosed
13 July 2011	Roger Johnson	Birmingham City	Wolverhampton Wanderers	Undisclosed
13 July 2011	(Republic of Ireland) Mark Yeates	Sheffield United	Watford	Undisclosed
14 July 2011	(Ghana) Prince Bauben	Unattached	Watford	Free
14 July 2011	Chris Brown	Unattached	Doncaster Rovers	Free
14 July 2011	Andrew Burns	Bolton Wanderers	Bradford City	Free
14 July 2011	Rene Howe	Peterborough United	Torquay United	Free
14 July 2011	Ben Mee	Manchester City	Burnley	Loan
14 July 2011	(Scotland) Ryan Flynn	(Scotland) Falkirk	Sheffield United	Undisclosed
14 July 2011	Clarke Carlisle	Burnley	Preston North End	Loan
15 July 2011	(France) Romain Vincelot	Dagenham & Redbridge	Brighton & Hove Albion	Undisclosed
15 July 2011	Liam Noble	Sunderland	Carlisle United	Loan
15 July 2011	(Brazil) Doni	(Italy) Roma	Liverpool	Free
15 July 2011	Stewart Downing	Aston Villa	Liverpool	Undisclosed
16 July 2011	(Democratic Republic of the Congo) Kazenga LuaLua	Newcastle United	Brighton & Hove Albion	Loan
18 July 2011	(Germany) Jérôme Boateng	Manchester City	(Germany) Bayern Munich	Undisclosed
18 July 2011	(Argentina) Gerardo Bruna	Liverpool	Blackpool	Undisclosed
18 July 2011	Jonathan Greening	Fulham	Nottingham Forest	£600k
18 July 2011	(France) Malaury Martin	Unattached	Middlesbrough	Free
18 July 2011	Scott Malone	Wolverhampton Wanderers	AFC Bournemouth	Loan
18 July 2011	(Spain) Antonio Amaya	Wigan Athletic	(Spain) Real Betis	Undisclosed
18 July 2011	(Republic of Ireland) Shay Given	Manchester City	Aston Villa	Undisclosed
18 July 2011	(Ivory Coast) Souleymane Coulibaly	(Italy) Siena	Tottenham Hotspur	Undisclosed
19 July 2011	(Republic of Ireland) Robbie Brady	Manchester United	Hull City	Loan
19 July 2011	(Hungary) Péter Gulácsi	Liverpool	Hull City	Loan
19 July 2011	(Scotland) Chris Iwelumo	Burnley	Watford	Undisclosed
19 July 2011	(Norway) Jonathan Parr	(Norway) Aalesund	Crystal Palace	Undisclosed
19 July 2011	Luke Daley	Norwich City	Plymouth Argyle	Undisclosed
19 July 2011	Waide Fairhurst	Doncaster Rovers	Macclesfield Town	Undisclosed
19 July 2011	(France) Chris Mavinga	Liverpool	(France) Rennes	Undisclosed
19 July 2011	(Belgium) Paul-Jose M'Poku	Tottenham Hotspur	(Belgium) Standard Liège	Undisclosed
20 July 2011	(Netherlands) George Boateng	Unattached	Nottingham Forest	Free
20 July 2011	(Czech Republic) Marcel Gecov	(Czech Republic) Slovan Liberec	Fulham	Undisclosed
20 July 2011	Mark Cullen	Hull City	Bury	Loan
20 July 2011	(Brazil) Denílson	Arsenal	(Brazil) São Paulo	Loan
20 July 2011	(Brazil) Jô	Manchester City	(Brazil) Internacional	Undisclosed
21 July 2011	(Ghana) John Paintsil	Unattached	Leicester City	Free
21 July 2011	Kyle Naughton	Tottenham Hotspur	Norwich City	Loan
21 July 2011	(Scotland) Barry Ferguson	Birmingham City	Blackpool	Free
21 July 2011	(Scotland) Robert Harris	Unattached	Blackpool	Free
21 July 2011	(Slovakia) Filip Kiss	(Slovakia) Slovan Bratislava	(Wales) Cardiff City	Loan
22 July 2011	Paul Bignot	(Wales) Newport County	Blackpool	Undisclosed
22 July 2011	(Belgium) Steve De Ridder	(Netherlands) De Graafschap	Southampton	Undisclosed
23 July 2011	(Brazil) Adriano Basso	Unattached	Hull City	Free
23 July 2011	Matthew Taylor	Bolton Wanderers	West Ham United	Undisclosed
25 July 2011	(Wales) Danny Gabbidon	West Ham United	Queens Park Rangers	Free
25 July 2011	(Switzerland) Pajtim Kasami	(Italy) Palermo	Fulham	Undisclosed
25 July 2011	(South Africa) Bongani Khumalo	Tottenham Hotspur	Reading	Loan
25 July 2011	Andrew Lonergan	Preston North End	Leeds United	Undisclosed
26 July 2011	(France) Rudy Gestede	Unattached	(Wales) Cardiff City	Free
26 July 2011	(Spain) Ángel Martínez	(Spain) Girona	Blackpool	Free
26 July 2011	(Scotland) Kenny Miller	(Turkey) Bursaspor	(Wales) Cardiff City	£870k
26 July 2011	David Stockdale	Fulham	Ipswich Town	Loan
26 July 2011	Kieran Trippier	Manchester City	Burnley	Loan
26 July 2011	Jay Emmanuel-Thomas	Arsenal	Ipswich Town	Undisclosed
26 July 2011	James Shea	Arsenal	Dagenham & Redbridge	Loan
26 July 2011	Sam Johnstone	Manchester United	Oldham Athletic	Loan
26 July 2011	(Belgium) Thibaut Courtois	(Belgium) Racing Genk	Chelsea	Undisclosed
27 July 2011	Nigel Reo-Coker	Unattached	Bolton Wanderers	Free
27 July 2011	(Scotland) Craig Sutherland	(United States) North Carolina State Wolfpack	Blackpool	Free
28 July 2011	(Argentina) Sergio Agüero	(Spain) Atlético Madrid	Manchester City	Undisclosed
28 July 2011	Danny Batth	Wolverhampton Wanderers	Sheffield Wednesday	Loan
28 July 2011	Nathan Byrne	Tottenham Hotspur	AFC Bournemouth	Loan
28 July 2011	(Denmark) Martin Hansen	Liverpool	Bradford City	Loan
28 July 2011	Michael Johnson	Manchester City	Leicester City	Loan
28 July 2011	Matthew Lund	Stoke City	Oldham Athletic	Loan
28 July 2011	Tom Parkes	Leicester City	Burton Albion	Loan
28 July 2011	Ryan Mason	Tottenham Hotspur	Doncaster	Loan
28 July 2011	Kern Miller	Barnsley	Accrington Stanley	Loan
29 July 2011	Ross Atkins	Derby County	Burton Albion	Loan
29 July 2011	Carl Dickinson	Stoke City	Watford	Undisclosed
29 July 2011	Chris Eagles	Burnley	Bolton Wanderers	Undisclosed
29 July 2011	Ben Foster	Birmingham City	West Bromwich Albion	Loan
29 July 2011	Tyrone Mears	Burnley	Bolton Wanderers	Undisclosed
29 July 2011	(Wales) Boaz Myhill	West Bromwich Albion	Birmingham City	Loan
29 July 2011	(France) Charles N'Zogbia	Wigan Athletic	Aston Villa	Undisclosed
29 July 2011	(Republic of Ireland) Sam Sheridan	Bolton Wanderers	Stockport County	Free
29 July 2011	Jed Steer	Norwich City	Yeovil Town	Loan
29 July 2011	(Wales) Jake Taylor	Reading	Aldershot Town	Loan
29 July 2011	(Scotland) Iain Turner	Everton	Preston North End	Free
30 July 2011	(Republic of Ireland) Joey O'Brien	Unattached	West Ham United	Free
30 July 2011	(Northern Ireland) Dean Shiels	Doncaster Rovers	Kilmarnock	Loan
31 July 2011	(Norway) Abdisalam Ibrahim	Manchester City	(Netherlands) N.E.C.	Loan
1 August 2011	(Colombia) Angelo Balanta	Queens Park Rangers	MK Dons	Loan
1 August 2011	Ben Hamer	Reading	Charlton Athletic	Undisclosed
2 August 2011	Nicholas Bignall	Reading	Exeter City	Loan
2 August 2011	(Argentina) Mauro Boselli	Wigan Athletic	(Argentina) Estudiantes	Loan
2 August 2011	Ben Gibson	Middlesbrough	Plymouth Argyle	Loan
2 August 2011	(Hungary) Zoltan Gera	Unattached	West Bromwich Albion	Free
2 August 2011	David Jones	Unattached	Wigan Athletic	Free
2 August 2011	Jake Kean	Blackburn Rovers	Rochdale	Loan
2 August 2011	(Republic of Ireland) Kevin Kilbane	Hull City	Derby County	Loan
2 August 2011	(United States) Jonathan Spector	Unattached	Birmingham City	Free
2 August 2011	(Republic of Ireland) Keith Treacy	Preston North End	Burnley	Undisclosed
3 August 2011	(Scotland) David Goodwillie	(Scotland) Dundee United	Blackburn Rovers	£2.8m
3 August 2011	(Nigeria) Carl Ikeme	Wolverhampton Wanderers	Middlesbrough	Loan
3 August 2011	Leroy Lita	Middlesbrough	(Wales) Swansea City	£1.75m
3 August 2011	Jon Stewart	Unattached	Burnley	Free
3 August 2011	(France) Steed Malbranque	Sunderland	(France) Saint-Étienne	Undisclosed
3 August 2011	(Portugal) Ricardo Vaz Tê	Unattached	Barnsley	Free
4 August 2011	Giles Barnes	Unattached	Doncaster Rovers	Free
4 August 2011	(Algeria) Rachid Bouhenna	Unattached	Doncaster Rovers	Free
4 August 2011	Dudley Campbell	Blackpool	Queens Park Rangers	Undisclosed
4 August 2011	Andrew Davies	Stoke City	Crystal Palace	Loan
4 August 2011	(Switzerland) Gelson Fernandes	(France) Saint-Étienne	Leicester City	Loan
4 August 2011	Thomas Ince	Liverpool	Blackpool	Undisclosed
4 August 2011	Tom James	Unattached	Watford	Free
4 August 2011	(Spain) Miguel Llera	Unattached	Blackpool	Free
4 August 2011	(Northern Ireland) Ryan McGivern	Manchester City	Crystal Palace	Loan
4 August 2011	Jonathan Obika	Tottenham Hotspur	Yeovil Town	Loan
4 August 2011	(Republic of Ireland) Darren O'Dea	(Scotland) Celtic	Leeds United	Loan
4 August 2011	Oscar Radford	Unattached	Doncaster Rovers	Free
4 August 2011	(Spain) Oriol Romeu	(Spain) Barcelona	Chelsea	£4.35m
4 August 2011	Wayne Routledge	Newcastle United	(Wales) Swansea City	Undisclosed
5 August 2011	(Serbia) Milan Jovanović	Liverpool	(Belgium) Anderlecht	Undisclosed
5 August 2011	Olly Lee	West Ham United	Dagenham & Redbridge	Loan
5 August 2011	(Republic of Ireland) Kevin Long	Burnley	Accrington Stanley	Loan
5 August 2011	Nathaniel Mendez-Laing	Wolverhampton Wanderers	Sheffield United	Loan
5 August 2011	(Colombia) Cristian Montaño	West Ham United	Notts County	Loan
5 August 2011	Liam Moore	Leicester City	Bradford City	Loan
5 August 2011	(Romania) Costel Pantilimon	(Romania) Poli Timișoara	Manchester City	Undisclosed
5 August 2011	Peter Ramage	Queens Park Rangers	Crystal Palace	Loan
5 August 2011	Michael Richardson	Newcastle United	Leyton Orient	Loan
5 August 2011	(Bulgaria) Aleksandar Tunchev	Leicester City	Crystal Palace	Loan
5 August 2011	(New Zealand) Chris Wood	West Bromwich Albion	Birmingham City	Loan
6 August 2011	Michael Ball	Unattached	Leicester City	Free
6 August 2011	(Norway) John Carew	Unattached	West Ham United	Free
6 August 2011	Christian Dailly	Unattached	Portsmouth	Free
6 August 2011	(Hungary) Márton Fülöp	Ipswich Town	West Bromwich Albion	Free
6 August 2011	(Russia) Yuri Zhirkov	Chelsea	(Russia) Anzhi Makhachkala	Undisclosed
8 August 2011	(Sweden) Oscar Jansson	Tottenham Hotspur	Bradford City	Loan
8 August 2011	(France) Dany N'Guessan	Leicester City	Millwall	Loan
8 August 2011	Alex Oxlade-Chamberlain	Southampton	Arsenal	Undisclosed
8 August 2011	(Italy) Mirko Ranieri	Tottenham Hotspur	(Italy) Esperia	Loan
9 August 2011	(Spain) Míchel	Birmingham City	(Spain) Getafe	Undisclosed
9 August 2011	(Republic of Ireland) Shane Long	Reading	West Bromwich Albion	Undisclosed
9 August 2011	(Republic of Ireland) James McClean	(Republic of Ireland) Derry City	Sunderland	£350k
9 August 2011	(France) Gabriel Obertan	Manchester United	Newcastle United	Undisclosed
9 August 2011	(Serbia) Radosav Petrović	(Serbia) Partizan	Blackburn Rovers	Undisclosed
9 August 2011	Josh Thompson	(Scotland) Celtic	Peterborough United	Loan
9 August 2011	Matthew Upson	Unattached	Stoke City	Free
10 August 2011	Matt Derbyshire	(Greece) Olympiacos	Nottingham Forest	Undisclosed
10 August 2011	(Northern Ireland) George McCartney	Sunderland	West Ham United	Loan
10 August 2011	(Republic of Ireland) Brian Murphy	Unattached	Queens Park Rangers	Free
10 August 2011	Chris Riggott	Unattached	Derby County	Free
10 August 2011	(Netherlands) Michel Vorm	(Netherlands) Utrecht	(Wales) Swansea City	£1.5m
11 August 2011	Phil Airey	Newcastle United	(Scotland) Hibernian	Loan
11 August 2011	(Northern Ireland) Michael Bryan	Watford	Bradford City	Loan
11 August 2011	(Wales) Ryan Doble	Southampton	AFC Bournemouth	Loan
11 August 2011	(Scotland) Danny Fox	Burnley	Southampton	Undisclosed
11 August 2011	(Croatia) Nikola Kalinić	Blackburn Rovers	(Ukraine) Dnipro	Undisclosed
11 August 2011	(Brazil) Bruno Perone	Unattached	Queens Park Rangers	Free
11 August 2011	(Turkey) Tuncay Şanlı	(Germany) VfL Wolfsburg	Bolton Wanderers	Loan
11 August 2011	James Tavernier	Newcastle United	Carlisle United	Loan
11 August 2011	(Spain) Xisco	Newcastle United	(Spain) Deportivo La Coruña	Loan
12 August 2011	(Republic of Ireland) Keith Andrews	Blackburn Rovers	Ipswich Town	Loan
12 August 2011	(Argentina) Julio Arca	Unattached	Middlesbrough	Free
12 August 2011	Will Atkinson	Hull City	Plymouth Argyle	Loan
12 August 2011	(France) Nouha Dicko	Unattached	Wigan Athletic	Free
12 August 2011	(Spain) José Enrique	Newcastle United	Liverpool	Undisclosed
12 August 2011	(Brazil) Bruno Ribeiro	(Brazil) Grêmio Prudente	Blackburn Rovers	Free
13 August 2011	(Zimbabwe) Benjani	Unattached	Portsmouth	Free
13 August 2011	(Scotland) Steven Smith	Norwich City	Preston North End	Free
15 August 2011	Michail Antonio	Reading	Colchester United	Loan
15 August 2011	(Spain) Cesc Fàbregas	Arsenal	(Spain) Barcelona	£30m
15 August 2011	Wes Fletcher	Burnley	Accrington Stanley	Loan
15 August 2011	Danny Ings	AFC Bournemouth	Burnley	Undisclosed
15 August 2011	(Republic of Ireland) Robbie Keane	Tottenham Hotspur	(United States) L.A. Galaxy	Undisclosed
15 August 2011	(Republic of Ireland) Andy Keogh	Wolverhampton Wanderers	Leeds United	Loan
15 August 2011	Ishmael Miller	West Bromwich Albion	Nottingham Forest	£1.2m
15 August 2011	Kudus Oyenuga	Tottenham Hotspur	Bury	Loan
16 August 2011	(Spain) Daniel Ayala	Liverpool	Norwich City	Undisclosed
16 August 2011	(Brazil) Pedro Botelho	Arsenal	(Spain) Rayo Vallecano	Loan
16 August 2011	Reece Brown	Manchester United	Doncaster Rovers	Loan
16 August 2011	(Ivory Coast) Emmanuel Eboué	Arsenal	(Turkey) Galatasaray	£3.1m
16 August 2011	Adam Smith	Tottenham Hotspur	MK Dons	Loan
16 August 2011	(Mexico) Carlos Vela	Arsenal	(Spain) Real Sociedad	Loan
17 August 2011	Ben Gordon	Chelsea	Peterborough United	Loan
17 August 2011	Ben Marshall	Stoke City	Sheffield Wednesday	Loan
17 August 2011	(Mexico) Carlos Salcido	Fulham	(Mexico) Tigres	Loan
18 August 2011	(Belgium) Faris Haroun	Unattached	Middlesbrough	Free
18 August 2011	Zavon Hines	West Ham United	Burnley	Tribunal
18 August 2011	(Norway) Erik Huseklepp	(Italy) Bari	Portsmouth	£1.5m
18 August 2011	(Belgium) Romelu Lukaku	(Belgium) Anderlecht	Chelsea	Undisclosed
19 August 2011	(Costa Rica) Joel Campbell	(Costa Rica) Saprissa	Arsenal	Undisclosed
19 August 2011	Leon Clarke	Queens Park Rangers	Swindon Town	Free
19 August 2011	(Wales) Michael Doughty	Queens Park Rangers	Crawley Town	Loan
19 August 2011	Anthony Gardner	Unattached	Crystal Palace	Free
19 August 2011	(Slovakia) Milan Lalkovič	Chelsea	Doncaster Rovers	Loan
22 August 2011	Ryan Harley	(Wales) Swansea City	Brighton & Hove Albion	Undisclosed
22 August 2011	(Greece) Sotirios Kyrgiakos	Liverpool	(Germany) VfL Wolfsburg	Undisclosed
22 August 2011	Joseph Mills	Southampton	Reading	Undisclosed
23 August 2011	Danny Drinkwater	Manchester United	Barnsley	Loan
23 August 2011	Cameron Park	Middlesbrough	Barnsley	Loan
23 August 2011	(Scotland) Lee Miller	Middlesbrough	Carlisle United	Free
23 August 2011	(Senegal) Guirane N'Daw	(France) Saint-Étienne	Birmingham City	Loan
23 August 2011	(Montenegro) Simon Vukčević	(Portugal) Sporting CP	Blackburn Rovers	Undisclosed
24 August 2011	(Finland) Lauri Dalla Valle	Fulham	(Scotland) Dundee United	Loan
24 August 2011	(Latvia) Kaspars Gorkšs	Queens Park Rangers	Reading	Undisclosed
24 August 2011	(Spain) Juan Mata	(Spain) Valencia	Chelsea	£23.5m
24 August 2011	(France) Samir Nasri	Arsenal	Manchester City	£25m
25 August 2011	(Togo) Emmanuel Adebayor	Manchester City	Tottenham Hotspur	Loan
25 August 2011	Jimmy Bullard	Unattached	Ipswich Town	Free
25 August 2011	Ashley Eastham	Blackpool	Bury	Loan
25 August 2011	(Spain) Iago Falqué	(Italy) Juventus	Tottenham Hotspur	Loan
25 August 2011	Jonathan Grounds	Middlesbrough	Chesterfield	Loan
25 August 2011	(Republic of Ireland) Daryl Murphy	(Scotland) Celtic	Ipswich Town	Loan
25 August 2011	(Northern Ireland) Adam Thompson	Watford	Brentford	Loan
26 August 2011	Sam Baldock	Milton Keynes Dons	West Ham United	Undisclosed
26 August 2011	Thomas Barkhuizen	Blackpool	Hereford United	Loan
26 August 2011	Joey Barton	Newcastle United	Queens Park Rangers	Free
26 August 2011	Lee Johnson	Bristol City	Chesterfield	Loan
26 August 2011	(Wales) Shaun MacDonald	(Wales) Swansea City	AFC Bournemouth	£80k
26 August 2011	(Senegal) Ibrahima Sonko	Unattached	Ipswich Town	Free
26 August 2011	(Austria) Andreas Weimann	Aston Villa	Watford	Loan
27 August 2011	(Mexico) Ulises Dávila	(Mexico) Guadalajara	Chelsea	Undisclosed
27 August 2011	Jonathan Hogg	Aston Villa	Watford	Undisclosed
27 August 2011	(Argentina) Emiliano Insúa	Liverpool	(Portugal) Sporting CP	Undisclosed
27 August 2011	Adam Le Fondre	Rotherham United	Reading	Undisclosed
27 August 2011	Luke Young	Aston Villa	Queens Park Rangers	Undisclosed
28 August 2011	Brett Williams	Reading	Rotherham United	Loan
29 August 2011	Leon Cort	Burnley	Charlton Athletic	Loan
29 August 2011	(Cameroon) Jean Makoun	Aston Villa	(Greece) Olympiacos	Loan
29 August 2011	(Paraguay) Brian Montenegro	(Uruguay) Deportivo Maldonado	West Ham United	Loan
29 August 2011	(Paraguay) Roque Santa Cruz	Manchester City	(Spain) Real Betis	Loan
30 August 2011	(Uruguay) Sebastián Coates	(Uruguay) Nacional	Liverpool	Undisclosed
30 August 2011	(Spain) Albert Crusat	(Spain) Almería	Wigan Athletic	Undisclosed
30 August 2011	(Senegal) Papa Bouba Diop	Unattached	West Ham United	Free
30 August 2011	Rob Elliot	Charlton Athletic	Newcastle United	Undisclosed
30 August 2011	(Republic of Ireland) Daniel Kearns	(Republic of Ireland) Dundalk	Peterborough United	Undisclosed
30 August 2011	Keanu Marsh-Brown	Fulham	(Scotland) Dundee United	Loan
30 August 2011	(Italy) Davide Santon	(Italy) Internazionale	Newcastle United	Undisclosed
30 August 2011	(Senegal) Armand Traoré	Arsenal	Queens Park Rangers	Undisclosed
30 August 2011	(Germany) Gerhard Tremmel	Unattached	(Wales) Swansea City	Free
30 August 2011	Josh Walker	Watford	Stevenage	Loan
30 August 2011	(South Korea) Park Chu-young	(France) AS Monaco	Arsenal	Undisclosed
31 August 2011	(Saudi Arabia) Ahmed Abdulla	West Ham United	Swindon Town	Loan
31 August 2011	Tom Adeyemi	Norwich City	Oldham Athletic	Loan
31 August 2011	(Spain) Mikel Arteta	Everton	Arsenal	£10m
31 August 2011	David Ball	Peterborough United	Rochdale	Loan
31 August 2011	Jermaine Beckford	Everton	Leicester City	£3m
31 August 2011	(Wales) Craig Bellamy	Manchester City	Liverpool	Undisclosed
31 August 2011	Ahmed Benali	Manchester City	Rochdale	Loan
31 August 2011	(Israel) Yossi Benayoun	Chelsea	Arsenal	Loan
31 August 2011	(Denmark) Nicklas Bendtner	Arsenal	Sunderland	Loan
31 August 2011	David Bentley	Tottenham Hotspur	West Ham United	Loan
31 August 2011	(Argentina) Federico Bessone	Leeds United	(Wales) Swansea City	Free
31 August 2011	(United States) Villyan Bijev	(Germany) Fortuna Düsseldorf	Liverpool	Undisclosed
31 August 2011	(United States) Villyan Bijev	Liverpool	(Germany) Fortuna Düsseldorf	Loan
31 August 2011	(Malta) Daniel Bogdanović	Sheffield United	Blackpool	Undisclosed
31 August 2011	Jordan Brown	West Ham United	Aldershot Town	Loan
31 August 2011	(Republic of Ireland) Shane Byrne	Leicester City	Bury	Loan
31 August 2011	(Costa Rica) Joel Campbell	Arsenal	(France) Lorient	Loan
31 August 2011	Joe Cole	Liverpool	(France) Lille	Loan
31 August 2011	Peter Crouch	Tottenham Hotspur	Stoke City	£10m
31 August 2011	Scott Dann	Birmingham City	Blackburn Rovers	Undisclosed
31 August 2011	(Mexico) Ulises Dávila	Chelsea	(Netherlands) Vitesse Arnhem	Loan
31 August 2011	David Davis	Wolverhampton Wanderers	(Scotland) Inverness Caledonian Thistle	Loan
31 August 2011	Jack Deaman	Unattached	Birmingham City	Free
31 August 2011	(Ivory Coast) Guy Demel	(Germany) Hamburger SV	West Ham United	Undisclosed
31 August 2011	(Republic of Ireland) Jamie Devitt	Hull City	Bradford City	Loan
31 August 2011	(Netherlands) Royston Drenthe	(Spain) Real Madrid	Everton	Loan
31 August 2011	(Republic of Ireland) Shane Duffy	Everton	Scunthorpe United	Loan
31 August 2011	Wade Elliott	Burnley	Birmingham City	Undisclosed
31 August 2011	Liam Feeney	AFC Bournemouth	Millwall	Undisclosed
31 August 2011	Anton Ferdinand	Sunderland	Queens Park Rangers	Undisclosed
31 August 2011	Jonathan Franks	Middlesbrough	Oxford United	Loan
31 August 2011	Joe Garner	Nottingham Forest	Watford	Undisclosed
31 August 2011	(Ivory Coast) Max Gradel	Leeds United	(France) Saint-Étienne	Undisclosed
31 August 2011	Jamie Griffiths	Ipswich Town	Plymouth Argyle	Loan
31 August 2011	(Czech Republic) Zdeněk Grygera	Unattached	Fulham	Free
31 August 2011	(Sweden) John Guidetti	Manchester City	(Netherlands) Feyenoord	Loan
31 August 2011	Owen Hargreaves	Unattached	Manchester City	Free
31 August 2011	(Spain) Vicente Rodríguez	Unattached	Brighton & Hove Albion	Free
31 August 2011	(Netherlands) Jos Hooiveld	(Scotland) Celtic	Southampton	Loan
31 August 2011	James Hurst	West Bromwich Albion	Blackpool	Loan
31 August 2011	(Scotland) Alan Hutton	Tottenham Hotspur	Aston Villa	Undisclosed
31 August 2011	(Spain) Pablo Ibáñez	West Bromwich Albion	Birmingham City	Undisclosed
31 August 2011	Jermaine Jenas	Tottenham Hotspur	Aston Villa	Loan
31 August 2011	Cameron Jerome	Birmingham City	Stoke City	Undisclosed
31 August 2011	(France) Gaël Kakuta	Chelsea	Bolton Wanderers	Loan
31 August 2011	Henri Lansbury	Arsenal	West Ham United	Loan
31 August 2011	(Scotland) Shaun Maloney	(Scotland) Celtic	Wigan Athletic	£1m
31 August 2011	Cody McDonald	Norwich City	Coventry City	Undisclosed
31 August 2011	(Northern Ireland) Ryan McGivern	Manchester City	Bristol City	Loan
31 August 2011	Anthony McNamee	Norwich City	Milton Keynes Dons	Free
31 August 2011	(Portugal) Raul Meireles	Liverpool	Chelsea	Undisclosed
31 August 2011	(Germany) Per Mertesacker	(Germany) Werder Bremen	Arsenal	Undisclosed
31 August 2011	(France) David Ngog	Liverpool	Bolton Wanderers	Undisclosed
31 August 2011	(France) Dany N'Guessan	Leicester City	Millwall	Undisclosed
31 August 2011	(Honduras) Wilson Palacios	Tottenham Hotspur	Stoke City	Undisclosed
31 August 2011	Scott Parker	West Ham United	Tottenham Hotspur	£5m
31 August 2011	(Denmark) Christian Poulsen	Liverpool	(France) Evian	Undisclosed
31 August 2011	(Costa Rica) Bryan Ruiz	(Netherlands) FC Twente	Fulham	£10.6m
31 August 2011	(Portugal) Orlando Sá	Unattached	Fulham	Free
31 August 2011	(Brazil) André Santos	(Turkey) Fenerbahçe	Arsenal	£6.2m
31 August 2011	Jay Simpson	Hull City	Millwall	Loan
31 August 2011	Emile Sinclair	Macclesfeild Town	Peterborough United	Undisclosed
31 August 2011	(France) Darnel Situ	(France) Lens	(Wales) Swansea City	£250k
31 August 2011	Junior Stanislas	West Ham United	Burnley	Undisclosed
31 August 2011	(Argentina) Denis Stracqualursi	(Argentina) Tigre	Everton	Loan
31 August 2011	(France) Gilles Sunu	Arsenal	(France) Lorient	Undisclosed
31 August 2011	Callum Tapping	Tottenham Hotspur	(Scotland) Heart of Midlothian	Undisclosed
31 August 2011	Ben Turner	Coventry City	(Wales) Cardiff City	Undisclosed
31 August 2011	(Netherlands) Patrick van Aanholt	Chelsea	Wigan Athletic	Loan
31 August 2011	Martyn Waghorn	Leicester City	Hull City	Loan
31 August 2011	Shaun Wright-Phillips	Manchester City	Queens Park Rangers	Undisclosed
31 August 2011	(Nigeria) Yakubu	Everton	Blackburn Rovers	Undisclosed

== See also ==
- List of Dutch football transfers summer 2011
- List of French football transfers summer 2011
- List of German football transfers summer 2011
- List of Italian football transfers summer 2011
- List of Spanish football transfers summer 2011

== Notes and references ==
General

- "Transfers – February 2011". BBC Sport. 28 February 2011.
- "Transfers – March 2011". BBC Sport. 20 March 2011.
- "Transfers – April 2011". BBC Sport. 15 April 2011.
- "Transfers – May 2011". BBC Sport. 31 May 2011.
- "Transfers – June 2011". BBC Sport. 30 June 2011.
- "Transfers – July 2011". BBC Sport. 30 July 2011.
- "Transfers – August 2011". BBC Sport. 30 August 2011.

Specific
