= Yvan Bourgis =

French football defender (born 1979)

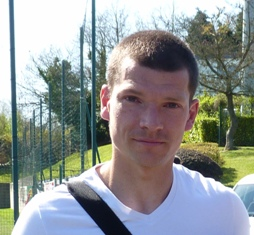

Personal information
- Date of birth: 24 September 1979 (age 47)
- Place of birth: Monistrol-sur-Loire, France
- Height: 1.69 m (5 ft 7 in)
- Position: Defender

Senior career*
Years	Team	Apps	(Gls)
1997–2001	AS Montferrandaise	?	(?)
2001–2003	Clermont Foot	39	(0)
2003–2011	Stade Brest 29	175	(0)
- * Club domestic league appearances and goals as of 14:36, 20 June 2009 (UTC)

Yvan Bourgis (born 24 September 1979) is a French football defender. He played for Stade Brest 29 over the eight seasons.
