= François Masson =

French footballer (born 1979)

Personal information
- Full name: François Masson
- Date of birth: 15 November 1979 (age 46)
- Place of birth: Rennes, France
- Height: 1.75 m (5 ft 9 in)
- Position: Midfielder

Senior career*
Years	Team	Apps	(Gls)
1996–1998	Angers SCO	0	(0)
1998–2000	Pontivy GS	43	(13)
2000–2002	AS Cannes	34	(3)
2002–2007	Dijon FCO	171	(27)
2007–2009	Brest	54	(4)
2009–2010	SC Amiens	28	(1)
2010–2011	AS Cannes	15	(1)
2013	FC La Chapelle-des-Marais	8	(5)
- * Club domestic league appearances and goals

François Masson (born 15 November 1979) is a retired French footballer who played as a midfielder.

== Career ==
A native of Rennes, Masson began playing youth football with Stade Rennais F.C. and Angers SCO. He made his senior football debut with Pontivy GS, scoring 13 goals in 32 matches. Then, he signed his first professional contract with AS Cannes. After the club was relegated from Ligue 2, he joined Dijon FCO in 2002.

Masson immediately established himself in Dijon's first team, helping the club reach the semi-finals of the 2003–04 Coupe de France and achieve promotion to Ligue 2 during the 2003–04 season. After five seasons with Dijon, when manager Rudi Garcia (who had brought him to the club) left, Masson left for Stade Brestois 29.
