= Ruffy Brook =

Stream in Minnesota, US

Coordinates: 47°47′39″N 95°22′54″W

Ruffy Brook is a stream in Clearwater County, Minnesota, in the United States.

Ruffy Brook was named after Charles A. Ruffee, an Indian agent.

== See also ==
- List of rivers of Minnesota
