= Romain Ciaravino =

French professional footballer (born 1984)

Personal information
- Date of birth: 24 January 1984 (age 42)
- Place of birth: Sausset-les-Pins, France
- Height: 1.78 m (5 ft 10 in)
- Positions: Attacking midfielder; striker

Senior career*
Years	Team	Apps	(Gls)
2006–2007	Gap FC		
2007–2011	Istres	47	(7)
2011–2013	Laval	3	(0)
2013–2014	Amiens	9	(1)
- * Club domestic league appearances and goals as of 23:33, 20 December 2017 (UTC)

Romain Ciaravino (born 24 January 1984) is a French professional footballer.

His father Michel played in Ligue 1 for FC Girondins de Bordeaux and AS Nancy.
