= Auriol Guillaume =

French footballer (born 1979)

Personal information
- Full name: Auriol Guillaume
- Date of birth: 14 October 1979 (age 47)
- Place of birth: Saint-Denis, France
- Height: 1.81 m (5 ft 11 in)
- Position: Defender

Youth career
- 1996–1998: Angers SCO
- 1998–1999: EA Guingamp

Senior career*
Years	Team	Apps	(Gls)
1999–2005	EA Guingamp	79	(2)
2005–2009	Troyes AC	52	(0)
2010–2011	AS Beauvais	12	(3)
2011–2012	Cannes	5	(1)
2019–2020	FCMT	1	(0)

International career
- Guadeloupe
- * Club domestic league appearances and goals

Auriol Guillaume (born 14 October 1979) is a retired French professional footballer who played as a defender.

== Career ==
In the summer of 2019, the two clubs Football Club de l'Agglomération Troyennes (FCAT) and Aube Sud Vanne Pays d'Othe (ASVPO) was dissolved, and Football club de la métropole troyenne (FCMT) was born. Guillaume joined the club ahead of the 2019–20 season at the age of 40.
