= Élise Fouin =

French designer

Élise Fouin (born 1979) is a French designer. She was educated in Paris at Ecole Boulle.

Her designs range from spectacular interior designs to individual items such as lamps, chairs, etc. Fouin has been profiled in the French design magazine Intramuroa.

== Biography ==
Élise Foin was born in 1979 in Franche-Comté, in a village near Vesoul. She grew up on the farm of a former monastery, her family (parents, grandparents, siblings) being farmers. She obtained a high school diploma in visual arts and then studied at the École Boulle, where she trained in goldsmithing, earning a diploma in arts and crafts, and then in object design, earning a higher diploma in applied arts in furniture design.

After completing her studies, she worked for two years in Andrée Putman studio, where she was recruited by the director at the time, Elliott Barnes. She spent another two years at Galeries Lafayette before founding her own studio in 2008. Since 2019, she has been renting a studio from the City of Paris, Villa du Lavoir in the 10th arrondissement.

Élise Foin has two children, Eliott (whose name refers to the director who recruited her after she graduated) and Castille (in homage to the designer Achille Castiglioni).
