= Matthieu Bochu =

French professional football player (born 1979)

Personal information
- Date of birth: March 31, 1979 (age 47)
- Place of birth: Arras, France
- Height: 1.76 m (5 ft 9 1/2 in)
- Positions: Attacking midfielder; striker

Team information
- Current team: FC Martigues

Senior career*
Years	Team	Apps	(Gls)
2000–2001	Sedan	0	(0)
2001–2002	Santarcangelo	19	(5)
2002–2003	Gubbio	18	(4)
2003–2004	Florentia Viola/Fiorentina	7	(0)
2004	Ravenna (loan)	14	(3)
2004–2005	Pro Vasto (loan)	27	(1)
2005–2006	Fiorentina	0	(0)
2006	Istres	13	(1)
2006–2007	Brest	29	(1)
2007–2008	Istres		
2008–2009	Racing de Ferrol		
2009–2010	CS Louhans-Cuiseaux	31	(5)
2010–	FC Martigues	30	(2)
- * Club domestic league appearances and goals as of 2011-11-18

Matthieu Bochu (born March 31, 1979, in Arras) is a French professional football player. He is a forward. Currently, he plays in the Championnat National for FC Martigues.

He also played for several years in a number of Italian minor league teams, including Fiorentina (then called Florentia Viola) in their Serie C2 campaign after the original club disbanded in 2002. He claims that the peak of his career was playing for Fiorentina against Juventus in the 2003 Italian Cup quarterfinal.

On 8 January 2010 he arrived in Sofia, Bulgaria, where he was trialed for local champions Levski Sofia. He finally decided to join the FC Martigues team who plays in Championnat de France amateur. The team is at the top of the league and fight to be promoted to Championnat National so they can become a Professional team again.
