= Sid Ahmed Rezala =

French serial killer

- Born: 13 May 1979; El Biar, Algeria
- Died: 28 June 2000 (aged 21); Lisbon, Portugal
- Cause of death: Suicide
- Other name: "The Killer of the Trains"
- Height: 5 ft 10 in (178 cm)
- Spouse: Nadia (m. 1997)
- Children: 1 daughter (b. 1998)

Details
- Victims: 3
- Span of crimes: 13 October – 14 December 1999
- Country: France
- Date apprehended: 11 January 2000

Sid Ahmed Rezala (13 May 1979 – 28 June 2000) was an Algerian-born French serial killer, dubbed "The Killer of the Trains". He was suspected of killing at least three women in 1999. Arrested in Portugal in early 2000, he confessed the murders to a reporter from the Figaro Magazine. Several weeks later, he killed himself before he could be extradited to France. He died of asphyxiation after he intentionally set fire to the mattress in his cell while his prison guards were watching football on TV.

== Biography ==
Born in Algeria, Sid Ahmed Rezala moved with his parents, brothers and sister to the southern French port of Marseille in 1994. Within weeks of registering at a Marseille high school, he began playing truant and mixing with petty criminals and drug dealers around the Marseille St Charles Train Station, and riding on trains. In early 1995, three months before his 16th birthday, Rezala was arrested for the rape of a 14-year-old boy. On 7 December 1995, he was sentenced in juvenile court to four years imprisonment. He was released in late 1996 after 18 months in prison.

In 1998, he was sent to a young offenders institution at Luynes, near Aix-en-Provence, for pulling a knife on a French railway employee. On 29 June 1999, he was released from jail.

French police launched a massive manhunt for Sid Ahmed Rezala in December 1999 after the murder of British student Isabel Peake, who was thrown from a train, and the subsequent killing of Corinne Caillaux, a 36-year-old French mother. Having fled to the Portuguese capital via Spain, Rezala made a phone call to a girlfriend from a public call box, unaware that investigators in France had tapped her phone. On 11 January 2000, Rezala's hiding place was discovered by Portuguese police, who arrested him in Barreiro, south of Lisbon. He had been staying in Almada with friends of a Spanish acquaintance and was planning to leave within 24 hours for Spain's Canary Islands.

On 28 June 2000, Rezala, who had confessed to killing three women, killed himself by setting fire to a mattress in his cell in the psychiatric wing of the Caxias Prison Hospital near Lisbon, where he was being held awaiting extradition to France to face trial.

== Victims ==
Rezala is suspected of murdering at least these three women:

=== Isabel Peake ===
Isabel Peake, a 20-year-old English student at Limoges University, was pushed from a train travelling to Paris in October 1999. She was on her way home to Barlaston, Staffordshire for a visit. On 13 October 1999, she boarded the train in Limoges. Her body was found the next day by a local farmer, who discovered her partially-clothed and dismembered corpse, and her baggage was found strewn along the line. Police concluded she was pushed from the train before dawn as it travelled at about 125 km/h (78 mph) through the disused station at Chabenet, central France, possibly after a sexual assault.

=== Émilie Bazin ===
Émilie Bazin, a 20-year-old student who was reportedly an acquaintance of Rezala's, was found strangled in a house in Amiens, northern France. On 17 December 1999, her decomposed body was discovered by police two months after her death, buried beneath a heap of coal in a cellar in Amiens. Traces of Rezala's DNA were found on her body.

=== Corinne Caillaux ===
On 14 December 1999, Corinne Caillaux, 36, was stabbed in the lavatory of a Calais to Ventimiglia overnight train. Guards found her slumped in a pool of blood in a train toilet. She had been stabbed at least 13 times and died later from her injuries. Caillaux was the mother of two children; her 5-year-old son lay sleeping on a couchette during the attack. Inspectors found a blood-soaked baseball hat near her body. Rezala was wearing a similar cap when he was found travelling without a ticket about two hours earlier, on the journey from Calais to Ventimiglia on the Italian frontier. DNA tests were conducted on hairs found in the hat. Police had a record of Rezala's DNA taken after earlier crimes.

== See also ==
- List of French serial killers
