= Laurent Quievreux =

French football referee and former player (born 1979)

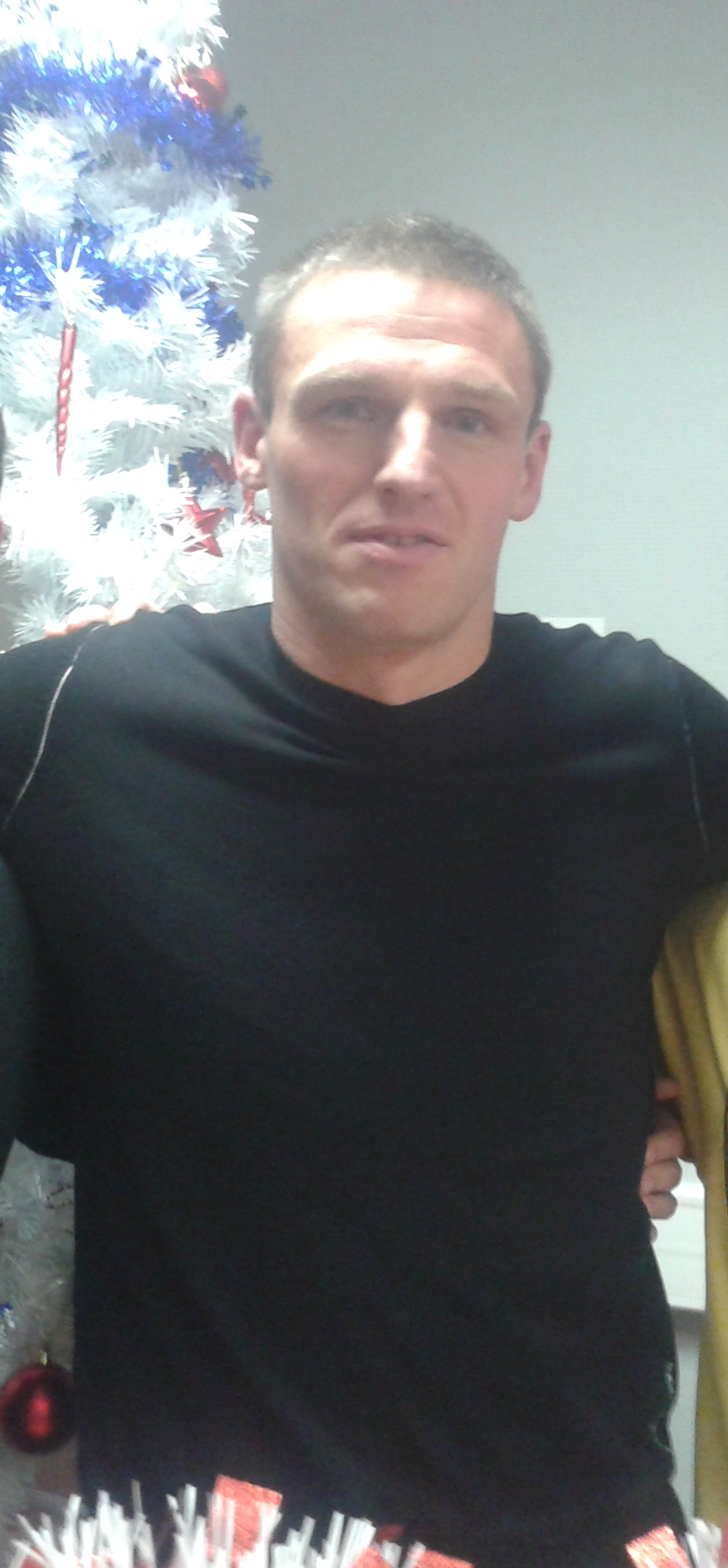
- Quievreux in 2013

Personal information
- Full name: Laurent Daniel Marcel Quievreux
- Date of birth: 10 March 1979 (age 47)
- Place of birth: Cambrai, France
- Height: 1.83 m (6 ft 0 in)
- Position: Goalkeeper

Senior career*
Years	Team	Apps	(Gls)
1999–2000	Paris SG	0	(0)
2000–2003	FC Istres	101	(0)
2003–2006	UD Leiria		
2006–2008	Clermont Foot	3	(0)
2008–2010	AC Ajaccio	11	(0)
- * Club domestic league appearances and goals

Laurent Quiévreux (born 10 March 1979) is a French football referee and former player. He played as goalkeeper for clubs in France's Ligue 1 and Ligue 2 and in Portugal before ending his playing career in 2010. He passed examinations to become a referee in 2011. (Note: Laurent Quievreux – French league stats at LFP – also available in French (archived))
