= Ruffy and the Riverside =

2025 video game

- Developer: Zockrates Laboratories UG
- Publisher: Phiphen Games
- Platforms: Microsoft Windows; Nintendo Switch; PlayStation 5; Xbox One; Xbox Series X/S
- Release: 26 June 2025
- Genres: Action-adventure, platformer
- Mode: Single-player

Ruffy and the Riverside is a 2025 action-adventure platformer developed by German studio Zockrates Laboratories UG and published by Phiphen Games. It was released for Microsoft Windows, Nintendo Switch, PlayStation 5, Xbox One, and Xbox Series X/S on 26 June 2025.

== Gameplay ==
Ruffy and the Riverside is an open world action-adventure game where the player controls Ruffy, who has platforming abilities. Ruffy has a special ability to swap materials, which allows him to copy and paste the textures and physical properties of the game's environment. This can help Ruffy in many ways, such as copying ice and pasting it on the river to freeze it, which then can be crossed over by Ruffy.

== Development and release ==
Ruffy and the Riverside was announced in February 2021, with targeting platforms being Nintendo Switch and Microsoft Windows. The developer later revealed the PlayStation 4, Xbox One, and Xbox Series X/S as additionally available systems. It was released on 26 June 2025.

The Switch version had performances issues at launch. The October 2025 update improved the frame rate on both systems, hitting 60 frames per second on Switch 2. It also improved the combat and camera systems.

== Reception ==
Reception

Aggregate scores
Aggregator	Score
Metacritic	NS: 71/100; PC: 79/100; PS5: 74/100; XSX: 68/100
OpenCritic	67% recommend

Review scores
Publication	Score
Destructoid	7/10
Nintendo Life	8/10
Nintendo World Report	7.5/10
Push Square	5/10

According to review aggregator website Metacritic, Ruffy and the Riverside received "generally favorable" reviews for the Microsoft Windows version, and "mixed or average" reviews for the Nintendo Switch, PlayStation 5, and Xbox Series X/S versions. 67% of critics recommended the game according to review aggregator OpenCritic.
