= Damien Gregorini =

French footballer (born 1979)

Damien Grégorini
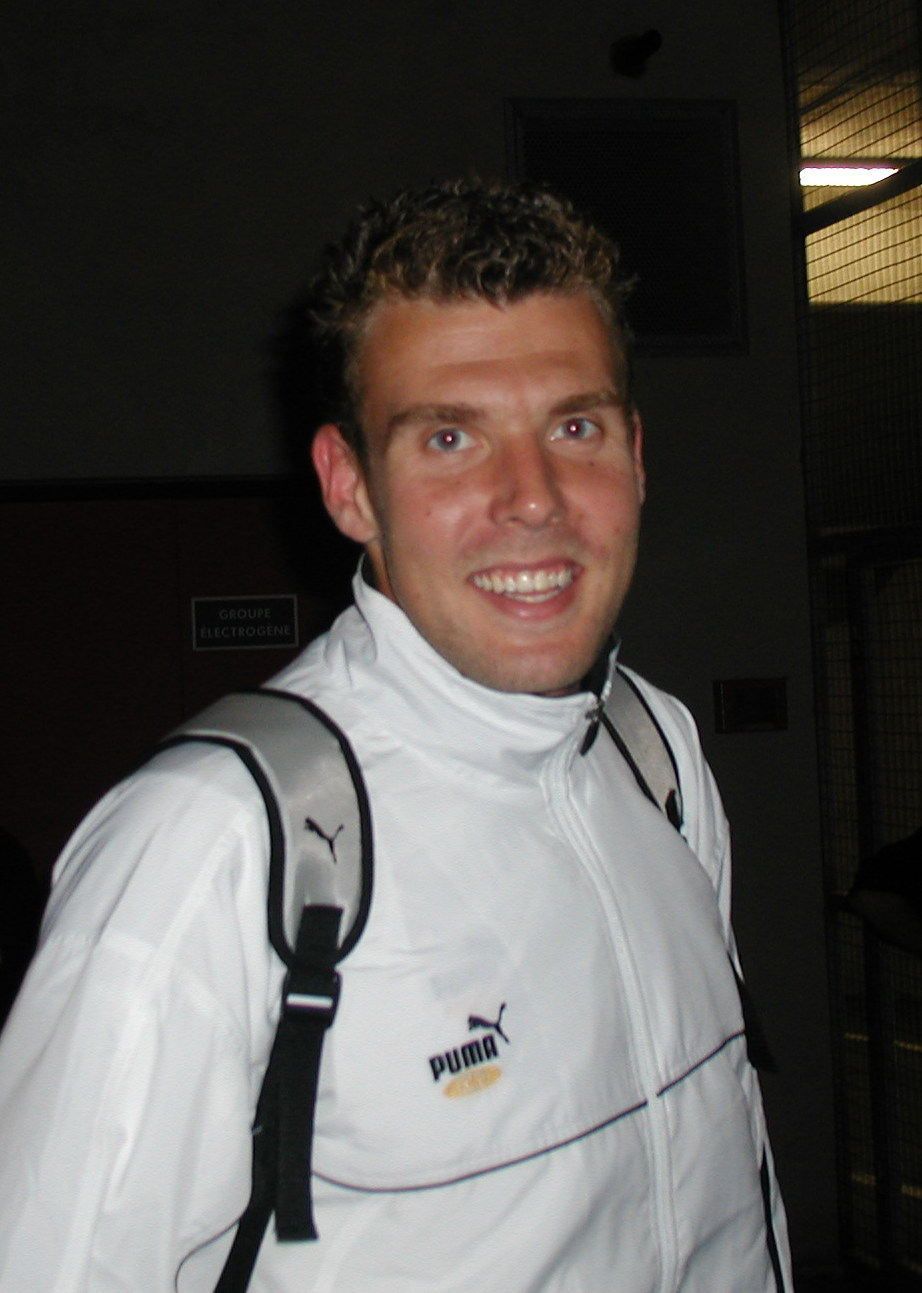
- Grégorini with Nice in 2002

Personal information
- Full name: Damien Grégorini
- Date of birth: 2 March 1979 (age 47)
- Place of birth: Nice, France
- Height: 1.94 m (6 ft 4 in)
- Position: Goalkeeper

Youth career
- Nice

Senior career*
Years	Team	Apps	(Gls)
1998–2000	Nice	44	(0)
2000–2002	Marseille	10	(0)
2002–2006	Nice	147	(0)
2006–2014	Nancy	101	(0)
Total		302	(0)
Medal record
Men's football
Representing France
UEFA European Under-21 Championship
Runner-up	2002 Switzerland
- * Club domestic league appearances and goals

Damien Grégorini (born 2 March 1979) is a French former professional footballer who played as a goalkeeper.

== Career statistics ==
=== Club ===
Appearances and goals by club, season and competition
Club	Season	League			National cup		League cup		Europe		Total	
Club	Season	Division	Apps	Goals	Apps	Goals	Apps	Goals	Apps	Goals	Apps	Goals
Nice	1997–98	Division 2	0	0	1	0	—		—		1	0
Nice	1998–99	Division 2	16	0	2	0	1	0	—		19	0
Nice	1999–2000	Division 2	28	0	1	0	2	0	—		31	0
Nice	Total		44	0	4	0	3	0	—		51	0
Marseille	2000–01	Division 1	9	0	1	0	0	0	—		10	0
Marseille	2001–02	Division 1	1	0	1	0	0	0	—		2	0
Marseille	Total		10	0	2	0	0	0	—		12	0
Nice	2002–03	Ligue 1	38	0	0	0	1	0	—		39	0
Nice	2003–04	Ligue 1	38	0	2	0	2	0	4	0	46	0
Nice	2004–05	Ligue 1	38	0	3	0	0	0	2	0	43	0
Nice	2005–06	Ligue 1	33	0	0	0	0	0	—		33	0
Nice	2006–07	Ligue 1	0	0	2	0	1	0	—		3	0
Nice	Total		147	0	7	0	4	0	6	0	164	0
Nancy	2006–07	Ligue 1	16	0	2	0	1	0	2	0	21	0
Nancy	2007–08	Ligue 1	0	0	2	0	3	0	—		5	0
Nancy	2008–09	Ligue 1	11	0	1	0	2	0	0	0	14	0
Nancy	2009–10	Ligue 1	6	0	2	0	1	0	—		9	0
Nancy	2010–11	Ligue 1	31	0	3	0	1	0	—		35	0
Nancy	2011–12	Ligue 1	7	0	1	0	1	0	—		9	0
Nancy	2012–13	Ligue 1	23	0	1	0	1	0	—		25	0
Nancy	2013–14	Ligue 2	7	0	0	0	0	0	—		7	0
Nancy	Total		101	0	12	0	10	0	2	0	125	0
Career total			302	0	25	0	17	0	8	0	352	0
