= 1979 French cantonal elections =

Cantonale elections to renew canton general councillors were held in France on 18 and 25 March 1979. The left gained 9 presidencies but lost 2.

== Electoral system ==
The cantonales elections use the same system as the regional or legislative elections. There is a 10% threshold (10% of registered voters) needed to proceed to the second round.

== National results ==
Runoff results missing

Party/Alliance	% (first round)	Seats
PS	26.9%	539
PCF	22.5%	236
UDF	21.1%	347
RPR	12.3%	172
Miscellaneous Right	10.7%	350
Miscellaneous Left	3.2%	54
MRG	1.9%	78
Far-Left	0.9%	0
Ecologists	0.5%	0
