= Lionel Cappone =

French footballer (born 1979)

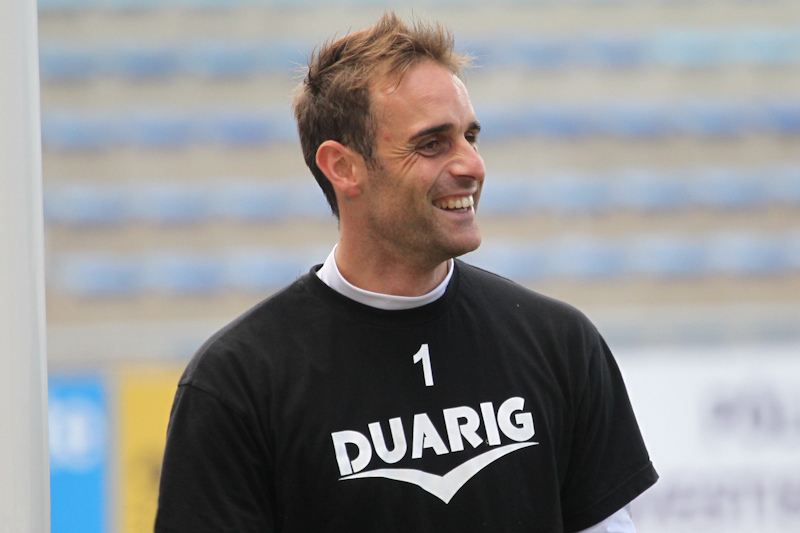

Personal information
- Full name: Lionel Cappone
- Date of birth: February 8, 1979 (age 47)
- Place of birth: Marignane, Bouches-du-Rhône, France
- Height: 1.83 m (6 ft 0 in)
- Position: Goalkeeper

Senior career*
Years	Team	Apps	(Gls)
1995–1999	Marseille	0	(0)
1999–2000	Bourg Péronnas	31	(0)
2000–2004	Besançon RC	129	(0)
2004–2005	Dijon	3	(0)
2005–2006	Angers	31	(0)
2006–2011	Lorient	30	(0)
2011–2013	Brest	2	(0)
2013–2017	Laval	108	(0)
Total		334	(0)
- * Club domestic league appearances and goals

Lionel Cappone (born February 8, 1979) is a French former professional football player who played as a goalkeeper.

Born in Marignane, a suburb of Marseille, he began his career at his local club, Olympique de Marseille. However, after several seasons without playing a single match, he joined Besançon RC, where he played every match in the 2002–03 Ligue 2 season.

Moving to another Ligue 2 club, Dijon FCO, he played just three matches in the 2003–04 season before moving to Angers SCO.

He moved to Ligue 1 club FC Lorient ahead of the 2006–07 season, where he was handed the number 1 shirt.

Cappone's debut for Lorient came on Saturday, October 28, 2006, when he was brought on 12 minutes into Lorient's match against Valenciennes FC to replace the injured Fabien Audard. However, it lasted all of 12 minutes; after taking down an opposing striker, he was sent off and had to be replaced by midfielder Ulrich Le Pen, who make a few very good saves in Lorient's 1–0 shutout victory.

In July 2011 signed a two-year contract with Stade Brestois.

== Career statistics ==
Appearances and goals by club, season and competition
Club	Season	League			National cup		League cup		Total	
Club	Season	Division	Apps	Goals	Apps	Goals	Apps	Goals	Apps	Goals
Bourg Péronnas	1999–2000	CFA	31	0	—		—		31	0
Besançon RC	2000–01	Championnat National	23	0	—		—		23	0
Besançon RC	2001–02	Championnat National	34	0	—		—		34	0
Besançon RC	2002–03	Championnat National	34	0	1	0	—		35	0
Besançon RC	2003–04	Ligue 2	38	0	2	0	1	0	41	0
Besançon RC	Total		129	0	3	0	1	0	133	0
Dijon	2004–05	Ligue 2	3	0	0	0	2	0	5	0
Angers	2005–06	Championnat National	31	0	0	0	1	0	32	0
Lorient	2006–07	Ligue 1	5	0	0	0	0	0	5	0
Lorient	2007–08	Ligue 1	0	0	1	0	1	0	2	0
Lorient	2008–09	Ligue 1	11	0	2	0	0	0	13	0
Lorient	2009–10	Ligue 1	3	0	0	0	1	0	4	0
Lorient	2010–11	Ligue 1	11	0	0	0	0	0	11	0
Lorient	Total		30	0	3	0	2	0	35	0
Brest	2011–12	Ligue 1	1	0	0	0	1	0	2	0
Brest	2012–13	Ligue 1	1	0	0	0	0	0	1	0
Brest	Total		2	0	0	0	1	0	3	0
Laval	2013–14	Ligue 2	15	0	0	0	0	0	15	0
Laval	2014–15	Ligue 2	34	0	3	0	3	0	40	0
Laval	2015–16	Ligue 2	36	0	2	0	4	0	42	0
Laval	2016–17	Ligue 2	23	0	2	0	0	0	25	0
Laval	Total		108	0	7	0	7	0	122	0
Career total			334	0	13	0	14	0	361	0
