= List of Italian football transfers summer 2011 =

For Italian football transfers summer 2011 see the following articles:

- List of Italian football transfers summer 2011 (co-ownership)
- List of Italian football transfers summer 2011 (June)
- List of Italian football transfers summer 2011 (July)
- List of Italian football transfers summer 2011 (August)
