= Romain Ruffier =

French footballer (born 1989)

Personal information
- Full name: Romain Ruffier
- Date of birth: 4 October 1989 (age 37)
- Place of birth: Nîmes, France
- Height: 1.88 m (6 ft 2 in)
- Position: Goalkeeper

Team information
- Current team: RFCU Luxembourg
- Number: 16

Youth career
- Béziers
- 2005–2009: Metz

Senior career*
| Years | Team | Apps | (Gls) |
| 2009–2010 | Metz | 2 | (0) |
| 2011–2013 | Amiens | 10 | (0) |
| 2013–2016 | Wiltz | 78 | (0) |
| 2016–2023 | RFCU Luxembourg | 182 | (0) |
| 2023–2024 | Differdange | 28 | (0) |
| 2024– | RFCU Luxembourg | 56 | (0) |
- * Club domestic league appearances and goals as of 13 June 2026

Romain Ruffier (born 4 October 1989) is a French professional footballer who plays as a goalkeeper for RFCU Luxembourg in the Luxembourg National Division. Racing FC was formed in 2005 from the merger of the capital's three big football clubs, namely Alliance 01, Spora and Union.

On 28 June 2023, Ruffier moved to Differdange, after spending 7 years at RFCU Luxembourg.
