= Pierre Planus =

French footballer (born 1979)

Personal information
- Full name: Pierre Planus
- Date of birth: March 25, 1979 (age 47)
- Place of birth: Bordeaux, France
- Position: Midfielder

Senior career*
Years	Team	Apps	(Gls)
1997–2000	Bordeaux B	67	(12)
2000–2002	Créteil-Lusitanos	33	(3)
2002–2003	Trélissac	31	(2)
2003–2006	Sannois	85	(12)
2006–2007	Angers	36	(3)
2007–2008	Paris FC	33	(3)
2008–2009	Créteil-Lusitanos	14	(0)
- * Club domestic league appearances and goals

Pierre Planus (born March 25, 1979) is a French midfielder.
