= Rumen Galabov =

Bulgarian footballer

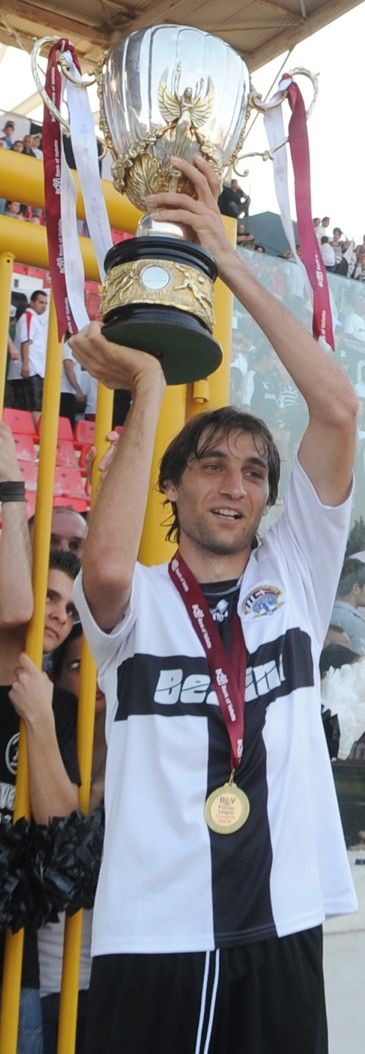

Personal information
- Full name: Rumen Angelov Galabov
- Date of birth: 29 July 1978 (age 48)
- Place of birth: Sofia, Bulgaria
- Height: 6 ft 2 in (1.88 m)
- Positions: Defender; midfielder

Youth career
- Septemvri Sofia

Senior career*
Years	Team	Apps	(Gls)
1999–2001	Beroe Stara Zagora	39	(3)
2002–2003	Valletta	11	(7)
2003–2005	Minyor Pernik	35	(10)
2005–2006	Vidima-Rakovski	8	(0)
2006	Minyor Pernik	11	(0)
2006–2008	Pietà Hotspurs	31	(2)
2008–2010	Hibernians	41	(6)
2010–2011	Marsaxlokk	39	(4)
2011–2012	Sliema Wanderers	21	(1)
2012–2013	Strumska slava		
- * Club domestic league appearances and goals

Rumen Angelov Galabov (Bulgarian: Румен Ангелов Гълъбов; born 29 July 1978 in Sofia) is a former Bulgarian professional footballer. He played as a defender and occasionally as a midfielder.

== Playing career ==
=== Beroe ===
During 1999/2001, Rumen Galabov played for Bulgarian A Professional Football Group side PFC Beroe Stara Zagora. He played 39 times for the club and scored three goals.

== Honours ==
=== Hibernians ===
- Maltese Premier League: 2008–09

=== Marsaxlokk ===
- Maltese First Division: 2009–10
