= 2000 UEFA European Under-18 Championship squads =

Player listings in youth football competition

== Group A ==
=== Croatia ===
Head coach:

No.	Pos.	Player	Date of birth (age)	Caps	Club	
1	GK	Marko Sarlija	31 January 1982 (aged 18)			(Croatian Football Federation) NK Dinamo Zagreb
12	GK	Hrvoje Slavica	27 April 1981 (aged 19)			(Croatian Football Federation) NK Sibenik
2	DF	Dino Drpic	10 February 1981 (aged 19)			(Croatian Football Federation) NK Dinamo Zagreb
4	DF	Vladimir Maljkovic	14 August 1982 (aged 17)			(German Football Association) Eintracht Frankfurt
3	DF	Alen Maras	27 February 1982 (aged 18)			(Croatian Football Federation) NK Varteks Varazdin
5	DF	Daniel Vuskovic	5 January 1981 (aged 19)			(Croatian Football Federation) NK Hajduk Split
16	MF	Kresimir Brkic	3 March 1981 (aged 19)			(Croatian Football Federation) NK Osijek
13	MF	Nikica Bule	17 October 1981 (aged 18)			(Croatian Football Federation) NK Dinamo Zagreb
14	MF	Marijan Buljat	12 September 1981 (aged 18)			(Croatian Football Federation) NK Zadarkomerc Zadar
15	MF	Mario Carevic	29 March 1982 (aged 18)			(Croatian Football Federation) NK Hajduk Split
6	MF	Igor Koretic	22 January 1981 (aged 19)			(Croatian Football Federation) NK Dinamo Zagreb
7	MF	Goran Rubil	9 March 1981 (aged 19)			(French Football Federation) FC Nantes Atlantique
8	MF	Nikola Safaric	11 March 1981 (aged 19)			(Croatian Football Federation) NK Varteks Varazdin
9	FW	Domagoj Abramovic	1 April 1981 (aged 19)			(Croatian Football Federation) NK Dinamo Zagreb
10	FW	Marko Babic	28 January 1981 (aged 19)			(German Football Association) Bayer 04 Leverkusen
17	FW	Sandro Klic	5 October 1981 (aged 18)			(Croatian Football Federation) NK Rijeka
11	FW	Darijo Srna	11 May 1981 (aged 19)			(Croatian Football Federation) NK Hajduk Split
18	FW	Dario Zahora	21 March 1982 (aged 18)			(Croatian Football Federation) NK Dinamo Zagreb

=== Germany ===
Head coach: Uli Stielike

No.	Pos.	Player	Date of birth (age)	Caps	Club	
12	GK	Timo Ochs	17 October 1981 (aged 18)	1	0	(German Football Association) Hannover 96
1	GK	Tom Starke	18 March 1981 (aged 19)	3	0	(German Football Association) Bayer 04 Leverkusen
3	DF	Christian Fickert	10 February 1981 (aged 19)	2	0	(German Football Association) SV Waldhof Mannheim
6	DF	Giueseppe Gemiti	3 May 1981 (aged 19)	4	1	(German Football Association) Eintracht Frankfurt
15	DF	Stephan Kling	22 March 1981 (aged 19)	3	0	(German Football Association) FC Bayern München
2	DF	Christoph Preuß	4 July 1981 (aged 19)	2	0	(German Football Association) Eintracht Frankfurt
13	DF	Benjamin Siegert	7 July 1981 (aged 19)	2	0	(German Football Association) VfL Wolfsburg
5	DF	Michael Zepek	19 January 1981 (aged 19)	4	0	(German Football Association) Karlsruher SC
8	MF	Hanno Balitsch	2 January 1981 (aged 19)	3	1	(German Football Association) SV Waldhof Mannheim
11	MF	Thorsten Burkhardt	21 May 1981 (aged 19)	3	0	(German Football Association) Bayer 04 Leverkusen
16	MF	Gino Laubinger	28 July 1981 (aged 18)	2	0	(German Football Association) Hertha BSC
7	MF	Benjamin Lauth	4 August 1981 (aged 18)	4	1	(German Football Association) TSV 1860 München
18	MF	Christian Mikolajzcak	15 May 1981 (aged 19)	4	0	(German Football Association) FC Schalke 04
4	MF	Marco Stark	9 July 1981 (aged 19)	2	0	(German Football Association) 1. FC Kaiserslautern
10	MF	Selim Teber	7 March 1981 (aged 19)	4	0	(German Football Association) SV Waldhof Mannheim
9	FW	Benjamin Auer	11 January 1981 (aged 19)	4	3	(German Football Association) Karlsruher SC
17	FW	Lars Jungnickel	4 August 1981 (aged 18)	4	2	(German Football Association) Dynamo Dresden
14	FW	Christian Tiffert	18 February 1982 (aged 18)	4	0	(German Football Association) VfB Stuttgart

=== Netherlands ===
Head coach:

No.	Pos.	Player	Date of birth (age)	Caps	Club
16	GK	Kees Kostwinder	5 May 1982 (aged 18)		(Netherlands) SC Heerenveen
1	GK	Cor Varkevisser	14 May 1982 (aged 18)		(Netherlands) Feyenoord
3	DF	Marcel Akerboom	28 October 1981 (aged 18)		(Netherlands) Fortuna Sittard
12	DF	Ruud Knol	13 March 1981 (aged 19)		(Netherlands) Vitesse
13	DF	Davio Mendes	8 April 1982 (aged 18)		(Netherlands) Sparta
2	DF	Steve Olfers	25 February 1982 (aged 18)		(Netherlands) Feyenoord
4	DF	Alje Schut	18 February 1981 (aged 19)		(Netherlands) FC Utrecht
14	DF	Sergio de Windt	9 August 1982 (aged 17)		(Italy) Juventus
8	MF	Said Boutahar	12 August 1982 (aged 17)		(Netherlands) Feyenoord
6	MF	René van Dieren	12 March 1981 (aged 19)		(Netherlands) Feyenoord
5	MF	Nick Hoekstra	12 August 1981 (aged 18)		(Netherlands) FC Twente
10	MF	Rafael van der Vaart	11 February 1982 (aged 18)		(Netherlands) Ajax
15	MF	Joos van Barneveld	18 January 1982 (aged 18)		(Netherlands) Fortuna Sittard
11	FW	Youssouf Hersi	20 August 1982 (aged 17)		(Netherlands) Ajax
9	FW	Thijs Houwing	22 April 1981 (aged 19)		(Netherlands) FC Twente
18	FW	Marnix Kolder	31 January 1981 (aged 19)		(Netherlands) BV Veendam
17	FW	Rahamat Mustapha	10 October 1981 (aged 18)		(Netherlands) RBC
7	FW	Jeffrey de Visscher	5 May 1981 (aged 19)		(Netherlands) FC Twente

=== Ukraine ===
Head coach: (Ukraine) Anatoliy Kroshchenko

No.	Pos.	Player	Date of birth (age)	Caps	Club
1	GK	Vitaliy Rudenko	26 January 1981 (aged 19)		(Ukraine) Chornomorets Odesa
2	DF	Roman Pasichnychenko (c)	17 June 1981 (aged 19)		(Ukraine) Dnipro-2 Dnipropetrovsk
3	DF	Bohdan Shershun	14 May 1981 (aged 19)		(Ukraine) Dnipro-2 Dnipropetrovsk
4	DF	Fedir Prokhorov	24 April 1981 (aged 19)		(Ukraine) Obolon-2 Kyiv
5	DF	Anton Monakhov	31 January 1982 (aged 18)		(Ukraine) Kryvbas-2 Kryvyi Rih
6	DF	Pavlo Kutas	3 September 1982 (aged 17)		(Ukraine) Dynamo-2 Kyiv
7	DF	Andriy Berezovchuk	16 April 1981 (aged 19)		(Ukraine) MFC Mykolaiv
8	DF	Denys Stoyan	24 August 1981 (aged 18)		(Ukraine) Borysfen Boryspil
9	MF	Vitaliy Komarnytskyi	2 August 1981 (aged 18)		(Israel) Maccabi Ironi
10	MF	Vitaliy Lysytskyi	16 April 1982 (aged 18)		(Ukraine) Dynamo-2 Kyiv
11	MF	Volodymyr Bondarenko	6 July 1981 (aged 19)		(Ukraine) CSKA-2 Kyiv
12	GK	Artem Kusliy	7 July 1981 (aged 19)		(Ukraine) Dnipro-2 Dnipropetrovsk
13	MF	Ihor Bendovskyi	6 October 1981 (aged 18)		(Germany) Borussia Dortmund II
14	MF	Dmytro Kondratovych	24 June 1981 (aged 19)		(Ukraine) Dnipro-2 Dnipropetrovsk
15	MF	Ruslan Valeyev	31 October 1981 (aged 18)		(Germany) Borussia Mönchengladbach
16	FW	Andriy Herasymenko	8 January 1981 (aged 19)		(Ukraine) Dynamo-2 Kyiv
17	FW	Oleksiy Byelik	15 February 1981 (aged 19)		(Ukraine) Shakhtar Donetsk
18	FW	Andriy Matveyev	6 May 1981 (aged 19)		(Ukraine) Dnipro-2 Dnipropetrovsk

== Group B ==
=== Czech Republic ===
Head coach:

No.	Pos.	Player	Date of birth (age)	Caps	Club	
1	GK	David Bičík	6 April 1981 (aged 19)			(Football Association of the Czech Republic) Sparta Prague
16	GK	Petr Čech	20 May 1982 (aged 18)			(Football Association of the Czech Republic) Chmel Blšany
12	DF	Pavel Besta	2 September 1982 (aged 17)			(Football Association of the Czech Republic) Baník Ostrava
15	DF	Jakub Bureš	26 April 1981 (aged 19)			(Football Association of the Czech Republic) Chmel Blšany
2	DF	Tomáš Hübschman	9 April 1981 (aged 19)			(Football Association of the Czech Republic) Jablonec
3	DF	Patrik Křap	13 March 1981 (aged 19)			(Football Association of the Czech Republic) Stavo Artikel Brno
8	DF	Jaroslav Šedivec	16 December 1981 (aged 18)			(Football Association of the Czech Republic) Viktoria Plzeň
13	DF	Rostislav Švec	20 October 1981 (aged 18)			(Football Association of the Czech Republic) Baník Ostrava
6	MF	Pavel Knietel	7 March 1981 (aged 19)			(Football Association of the Czech Republic) Dynamo České Budějovice
11	MF	David Kobylík	27 June 1981 (aged 19)			(Football Association of the Czech Republic) Sigma Olomouc
9	MF	Michal Macek	19 January 1981 (aged 19)			(Football Association of the Czech Republic) Příbram
10	MF	Stanislav Rozboud	12 April 1981 (aged 19)			(Football Association of the Czech Republic) Dynamo České Budějovice
5	MF	Petr Silný	7 April 1981 (aged 19)			(Football Association of the Czech Republic) Slovan Liberec
7	MF	Vlastimil Vidlička	2 July 1981 (aged 19)			(Football Association of the Czech Republic) Svit Zlín
18	FW	Milan Baroš	28 October 1981 (aged 18)			(Football Association of the Czech Republic) Baník Ostrava
17	FW	Petr Jendruščák	27 April 1981 (aged 19)			(Football Association of the Czech Republic) Mladá Boleslav
14	FW	David Lafata	18 September 1981 (aged 18)			(Football Association of the Czech Republic) Dynamo České Budějovice
4	FW	Tomáš Pešír	30 May 1981 (aged 19)			(Football Association of the Czech Republic) Slavia Prague

=== Finland ===
Head coach:

No.	Pos.	Player	Date of birth (age)	Caps	Club	
1	GK	Otto Fredrikson	3 November 1981 (aged 18)			(Football Association of Finland) Tervarit Oulu
12	GK	Mikko Rahkamaa	21 September 1981 (aged 18)			(Football Association of Finland) FC Jokerit Helsinki
5	DF	Tuomas Aho	21 May 1981 (aged 19)			(Football Association of Finland) MyPa Anjalankoski
13	DF	Harri Haapaniemic	11 April 1981 (aged 19)			(Football Association of Finland) FC Jazz Pori
3	DF	Ossi Martikainen	25 November 1982 (aged 17)			(Football Association of Finland) HJK Helsinki
2	DF	Antti Okkonen	6 June 1982 (aged 18)			(Football Association of Finland) MyPa Anjalankoski
6	DF	Marco Parnela	5 January 1981 (aged 19)			(Swiss Football Association) FC Thun
16	DF	Jukka Sauso	20 June 1982 (aged 18)			(Football Association of Finland) VPS Vaasa
14	MF	Kristian Kunnas	1 November 1981 (aged 18)			(Football Association of Finland) HJK Helsinki
4	MF	Mika Niskala	28 March 1982 (aged 18)			(Swedish Football Association) IFK Norrköping
15	MF	Ilpo Verno	22 December 1981 (aged 18)			(Football Association of Finland) KäPa
10	FW	Mikael Forssell	15 March 1981 (aged 19)			(The Football Association) FC Chelsea
7	FW	Hannu Haarala	15 August 1981 (aged 18)			(Football Association of Finland) HJK Helsinki
17	FW	Jussi Kujala	4 April 1983 (aged 17)			(Football Association of Finland) Tampere United
8	FW	Teemu Lampinen	23 January 1981 (aged 19)			(Football Association of Finland) FC Lahti
18	FW	Matti Santahuhta	13 August 1981 (aged 18)			(Football Association of Finland) FC Jazz Pori
11	FW	Daniel Sjölund	22 April 1983 (aged 17)			(The Football Association) West Ham United
9	FW	Mika Väyrynen	28 December 1981 (aged 18)			(Football Association of Finland) FC Lahti

=== France ===
Head coach: (France) Jacques Crevoisier

No.	Pos.	Player	Date of birth (age)	Caps	Club	
1	GK	Nicolas Penneteau	28 February 1981 (aged 19)			(French Football Federation) SC Bastia
16	GK	Jérémy Sopalski	6 February 1981 (aged 19)			(French Football Federation) AJ Auxerre
14	DF	Jean-Félix Dorothee	2 October 1981 (aged 18)			(French Football Federation) Stade Rennes
4	DF	Gael Givet	5 October 1981 (aged 18)			(French Football Federation) AS Monaco
5	DF	Philippe Mexes	30 March 1982 (aged 18)			(French Football Federation) AJ Auxerre
12	DF	Steven Pele	28 August 1981 (aged 18)			(French Football Federation) Stade Rennes
3	DF	Grégory Vignal	19 July 1981 (aged 18)			(French Football Federation) SC Montpellier
2	MF	Pascal Berenguer	20 May 1981 (aged 19)			(French Football Federation) SC Bastia
6	MF	Benoit Cheyrou	3 May 1981 (aged 19)			(French Football Federation) OSC Lille
13	MF	Gael Danic	19 November 1981 (aged 18)			(French Football Federation) Stade Rennes
15	MF	Nicolas Fabiano	8 February 1981 (aged 19)			(French Football Federation) FC Paris Saint-Germain
10	MF	Lionel Mathis	4 October 1981 (aged 18)			(French Football Federation) AJ Auxerre
11	MF	Bernard Mendy	20 August 1981 (aged 18)			(French Football Federation) FC Paris Saint-Germain
8	MF	Sébastien Roudet	16 June 1981 (aged 19)			(French Football Federation) LB Châteauroux
7	FW	Hassan Ahamada	13 April 1981 (aged 19)			(French Football Federation) FC Nantes Atlantique
17	FW	Hervé Bugnet	24 August 1981 (aged 18)			(French Football Federation) Girondins Bordeaux
18	FW	Djibril Cisse	12 August 1981 (aged 18)			(French Football Federation) AJ Auxerre
9	FW	Mathieu Maton	19 January 1981 (aged 19)			(French Football Federation) OSC Lille

=== Russia ===
Head coach:

No.	Pos.	Player	Date of birth (age)	Caps	Club	
12	GK	Stanislav Khoteev	7 March 1981 (aged 19)			(Russian Football Union) Lokomotiv Moscow
1	GK	Veniamin Mandrykine	30 August 1981 (aged 18)			(Russian Football Union) Alania Vladikavkaz
13	DF	Igor Balashov	9 March 1981 (aged 19)			(Russian Football Union) Spartak Shuia
3	DF	Aleksandr Belozerov	27 October 1981 (aged 18)			(Russian Football Union) Lada Toliatti
2	DF	Oleg Kouzmine	9 May 1981 (aged 19)			(Russian Football Union) Spartak Moscow
6	DF	Kirill Novikov	4 January 1981 (aged 19)			(Russian Football Union) Dinamo Moscow
4	DF	Roman Romanov	5 February 1981 (aged 19)			(Russian Football Union) Rotor Volgograd
7	DF	Ivan Teliatnikov	29 April 1981 (aged 19)			(Russian Football Union) Lokomotiv Moscow
17	MF	Alexandre Chichipkov	6 April 1981 (aged 19)			(Russian Football Union) Spartak Moscow
15	MF	Pavel Khramov	19 March 1981 (aged 19)			(Russian Football Union) CSKA Moscow
18	MF	Konstantin Lobov	18 May 1981 (aged 19)			(Russian Football Union) Zenit-2 Saint Petersburg
16	MF	Anatoli Malkov	8 July 1981 (aged 19)			(Russian Football Union) Rotor Volgograd
5	MF	Semen Semenenko	9 July 1981 (aged 19)			(Russian Football Union) Lokomotiv Moscow
10	FW	Serguei Gorokhov	12 November 1981 (aged 18)			(Russian Football Union) Avtodor Vladikavkaz
8	FW	Rouslan Pimenov	25 November 1981 (aged 18)			(Russian Football Union) Lokomotiv Moscow
11	FW	Sandro Klic	5 October 1981 (aged 18)			(Russian Football Union) CSKA Moscow
14	FW	Maxim Tokarev	7 October 1981 (aged 18)			(Russian Football Union) Lada Toliatti
9	FW	Evgueni Zinoviev	15 June 1981 (aged 19)			(Russian Football Union) Lokomotiv Moscow
