= 2010–11 KNVB Cup =

Tournament details
- Country: Netherlands
- Teams: 88

Final positions
- Champions: FC Twente
- Runners-up: Ajax

Tournament statistics
- Top goal scorer: Albert van Nijhuis (5)

The 2010–11 KNVB Cup was the 93rd edition of the Dutch national football annual knockout tournament for the KNVB Cup. 88 teams contested beginning on 18 August 2010 with the matches of Round 1 and ending with the final on 8 May 2011.

AFC Ajax would unsuccessfully defend on 8 May 2011 at De Kuip, Rotterdam, its 2010 title at the 2011 Cup losing to Twente, 3–2 (A.E.T.). 45,000 attended. Twente qualified for the play-off round of the 2011–12 UEFA Europa League.

== Calendar ==
The calendar for the remaining rounds of the 2010–11 KNVB Cup, as announced by the KNVB was as follows.

Rounds	Date
First round	18 August 2010
Second round	25 August 2010
Third round	21, 22, or 23 September 2010
Fourth round	9, 10, or 11 November 2010
Fifth round	25, 26 or 27 January 2011
Semi-finals	2 & 3, March 2011
Final	8 May 2011

== First round ==
Four amateur clubs competed in this stage of the competition for two places in the Second Round. These matches took place on 18 August 2010.

Team 1	Score	Team 2
Be Quick 1887	2–1	ASWH
HHC Hardenberg	1–1 (a.e.t.); 1–4 (pen)	SV Venray

== Second round ==
The two winners from the First Round and the 52 other amateur club participants entered in this round of the tournament. These matches took place on 25 August 2010.

Team 1	Score	Team 2
Be Quick 1887	1–2 (a.e.t.)	HSC '21
SDC Putten	3–0	SV Argon
Quick '20	0–1	ACV
UVS	0–3	DOVO
Haaglandia	2–2 (a.e.t.); 5–4 (pen)	SVZW
Rijnsburgse Boys	2–0	Dongen
Kloetinge	3–4	VVSB
Capelle	4–0	Sneek Wit Zwart
CSV Apeldoorn	0–1	Gemert
EVV	2–1	IJsselmeervogels
Lisse	0–2	Dijkse Boys
Genemuiden	2–2 (a.e.t.); 6–5 (pen)	Hilversum
Vlissingen	1–3	Spakenburg
HVCH	1–5	Sparta Nijkerk
Achilles '29	6–0	PKC '83
Kozakken Boys	6–1	AFC
JVC Cuijk	2–3	Excelsior '31
Hollandia	4–2	Harkemase Boys
Voorschoten '97	3–0 (a.e.t.)	Presikhaaf
WKE	6–1	GVVV
De Treffers	3–1	Hoek
Deurne	3–0	Barendrecht
Wilhelmina '08	1–11	Katwijk
Zwaluwen '30	1–1 (a.e.t.); 3–5 (pen)	Groene Ster
Flevo Boys	1–0	Baronie
Noordwijk	3–2	Lienden
ARC	4–0	SV Venray

== Third round ==
The 27 winners from the Second Round entered this stage of the competition along with Oss, the 18 Eerste Divisie clubs and the 18 Eredivisie clubs. These matches took place from 21 to 23 September 2010.

Team 1	Score	Team 2
Zwolle	2–2 (a.e.t.); 5–4 (pen)	Willem II
Noordwijk	3–1	Voorschoten '97
Hollandia	1–2	Volendam
HSC '21	0–2	Go Ahead Eagles
Spakenburg	0–0 (a.e.t.); 5–3 (pen)	RBC Roosendaal
Veendam	2–1 (a.e.t.)	Helmond Sport
SDC Putten	1–1 (a.e.t.); 4–3 (pen)	DOVO
Sparta Nijkerk	2–1	Kozakken Boys
Telstar	3–1	Fortuna Sittard
Genemuiden	2–0	ACV
Flevo Boys	0–6	Vitesse Arnhem
RKC Waalwijk	4–1	Almere City
Excelsior '31	0–2	ADO Den Haag
Emmen	1–3	Heerenveen
VVSB	0–2	Cambuur
De Graafschap	1–1(pen)	Utrecht
Ajax	5–0	MVV
Den Bosch	2–3	AZ
Capelle	1–4	Twente
De Treffers	5–1	Katwijk
WKE	0–3	Excelsior
Rijnsburgse Boys	4–2(a.e.t.)	Deurne
Groene Ster	2–2(pen)	Dijkse Boys
ARC	0–3	Heracles
Gemert	0–4(a.e.t.)	AGOVV
Haaglandia	1–4(a.e.t.)	Groningen
EVV	3–5	Eindhoven
Feyenoord	1–1(pen)	Roda JC
PSV	3–0	Sparta Rotterdam
Dordrecht	4–3	NEC
Achilles '29	2–0	Oss
NAC Breda	3–1	VVV-Venlo

== Fourth round ==
These matches took place between 9 and 11 November 2010.

Team 1	Score	Team 2
AZ	3–0	FC Eindhoven
Sparta Nijkerk (III)	2–1	Excelsior
Ajax	3–0	Veendam (II)
Dijkse Boys (III)	1–9	SC Genemuiden (III)
Groningen	1–1(a.e.t.); 5–4 (pen)	ADO Den Haag
AGOVV (II)	0–2	Utrecht
Cambuur (II)	1–4	RKC Waalwijk (II)
PSV	3–0	Spakenburg (III)
Dordrecht (II)	1–2	Volendam (II)
Go Ahead Eagles (II)	0–2	Roda JC
De Treffers (III)	0–1	Noordwijk (IV)
Zwolle (II)	1–1 (a.e.t.); 3–5 (pen)	Twente
Heerenveen	0–2	NAC Breda
Achilles '29(III)	5–3	Heracles Almelo
SDC Putten (IV)	0–2	Telstar (II)
Vitesse Arnhem	3–0	Rijnsburgse Boys (III)

== Fifth round ==
These matches took place between 21 and 23 December 2010.

Team 1	Score	Team 2
Ajax	1–0	AZ
Roda JC	1–3	PSV
Genemuiden (III)	2–3	Groningen
Utrecht	1–0	Volendam (II)
Telstar (II)	0–1	NAC Breda
Achilles '29 (III)	2–2 (a.e.t.); 1–3 (pen)	RKC Waalwijk (II)
Twente	5–0	Vitesse Arnhem
Sparta Nijkerk(III)	3–3 (a.e.t.); 3–4 (pen)	Noordwijk (IV)

23 December 2010	Ajax	1–0	AZ	Amsterdam
19:45	Sulejmani 42'		Wernbloom (red card) 72'	Stadium: Johan Cruyff Arena; Attendance: 29,539; Referee: Ed Janssen

22 December 2010	Roda JC	1–3	PSV	Kerkrade
19:45	Vormer 42'; Kah (yellow card) 18' (yellow-red card) 62'		Toivonen 27'; Berg 55'; Dzsudzsák 72'	Stadium: Parkstad Limburg Stadion; Attendance: 6,200; Referee: Danny Makkelie

18 January 2011	Genemuiden	2–3	Groningen	Genemuiden
19:00	Cornelia 22' van der Kolk 74'		Hiariej 36'; Enevoldsen 45', 62'	Stadium: Sportpark De Wetering; Attendance: 3,500; Referee: Serdar Gözübüyük

22 December 2010	Utrecht	1–0	Volendam	Utrecht
19:00	Maguire 88'			Stadium: Stadion Galgenwaard; Attendance: 10,000; Referee: Bas Nijhuis

18 January 2011	Telstar	0–1	NAC Breda	Velsen-Zuid
19:45			Luijckx 27'	Stadium: Rabobank IJmond Stadion; Attendance: 2,563; Referee: Jan Wegereef

18 January 2011	Achilles '29	2–2 (a.e.t.) (1–3 p)	RKC Waalwijk	Groesbeek
19:00	Hempenius 58'; Rigter 108'		Janssen 86', 96', (red card) 104'	Stadium: Sportpark De Heikant; Attendance: 1,200; Referee: Michel Winter
	Penalties
	van Straaten (penalty scored); Konings (penalty missed); Sanders (penalty missed); Goorman (penalty missed)		(penalty scored) de Groot; (penalty scored) Bandjar; (penalty scored) van Hout; (penalty missed) Meijers

21 December 2010	Twente	5–0	Vitesse Arnhem	Enschede
19:45	Janssen 29', 37' de Jong 32', 60'; Chadli 44'			Stadium: De Grolsch Veste; Attendance: 23,000; Referee: Kevin Blom

18 January 2011	Sparta Nijkerk	3–3 (a.e.t.) (3–5 p)	Noordwijk	Nijkerk
19:00	van der Wilt 24', 91' van Nijhuis 77'		Faouzi 31', 100'; Akerboom 39'	Stadium: De Ebbenhorst; Attendance: 5,350; Referee: Maarten Ketting
	Penalties
	van Nijhuis (penalty scored) de Goede (penalty scored) van Rooijen (penalty scored) van der Vegte (penalty missed)		(penalty scored) Akerboom; (penalty scored) Meurs; (penalty scored) Stuifbergen; (penalty scored) van Vliet; (penalty scored) van der Geest

== Quarter finals ==
These matches took place between 25 and 27 January 2011.

Team 1	Score	Team 2
Twente	1–1 (a.e.t.); 7–6 (pen)	PSV
Ajax	4–1	NAC Breda
Utrecht	3–2	Groningen
RKC Waalwijk (II)	6–0	Noordwijk (IV)

26 January 2011	Twente	1–1 (a.e.t.) (7–6 p)	PSV	Enschede
19:45	Janssen 70' (pen.)		Koevermans 90+3'	Stadium: De Grolsch Veste; Attendance: 21,000; Referee: Pieter Vink
	Penalties
	Janssen (penalty scored); Landzaat (penalty scored); Chadli (penalty scored); Janko (penalty scored); Douglas (penalty scored) de Jong (penalty scored); Tiendalli (penalty scored)		(penalty scored) Hutchinson; (penalty scored) Manolev; (penalty scored) Berg; (penalty scored) Toivonen; (penalty scored) Dzsudzsák; (penalty scored) Koevermans; (penalty missed) Engelaar

27 January 2011	Ajax	4–1	NAC Breda	Amsterdam
19:45	de Jong 18'; Sulejmani 35', 83'; Anita 82'		Idabdelhay 8'	Stadium: Johan Cruyff Arena; Attendance: 22,536; Referee: Danny Makkelie

26 January 2011	Utrecht	3–2	Groningen	Utrecht
19:45	Wuytens 12'; Mertens 31' (pen.); Asare 53'		Matavž 18'; Granqvist 48' (pen.)	Stadium: Stadion Galgenwaard; Attendance: 10,400; Referee: Björn Kuipers

25 January 2018	RKC Waalwijk	6–0	Noordwijk	Waalwijk
19:00	de Groot 8' van Hout 14', 20', 24'; Boerrigter 39', 65'			Stadium: Mandemakers Stadion; Attendance: 2,394; Referee: Tom van Sichem

== Semi finals ==
These matches were played between 2 and 3 March 2011.

2 March 2011
20:45

Twente	1–0	Utrecht
Janko 77'	Report

De Grolsch Veste, Enschede
Attendance: 21,800
Referee: van Boekel

3 March 2011
20:45

Ajax	5–1	Waalwijk
Ebecilio 13'; El Hamdaoui 33'; De Jong 55', 85'; De Zeeuw 58'	Report	Blind 27' (o.g.)

Amsterdam ArenA, Amsterdam
Attendance: 28,156
Referee: Wiedemeijer

== Final ==
8 May 2011
18:00

Twente	3–2 (A.E.T)	Ajax
Brama 45'; Janssen 56'; Janko 117'	Report	De Zeeuw 19'; Ebecillio 40'

De Kuip, Rotterdam
Attendance: 45,000
Referee: Blom
