= Hout (disambiguation) =

Hout is a surname.

It may also refer to:

- Hout, Syria, a village
- Hout River, Limpopo Province, South Africa
- Alkmaarderhout, a former multi-purpose stadium in Alkmaar, Netherlands, known as the "Hout"

== See also ==
- Houts, another surname
