= Van Houten House =

Van Houten House may refer to:

- Van Houten–Hillman House, Elmwood, New Jersey, listed on the NRHP in Bergen County
- Van Houten House (Franklin Lakes, New Jersey), listed on the NRHP in Bergen County
- Van Houten–Ackerman House (Franklin Lakes, New Jersey), listed on the NRHP in Bergen County
- Holdrum–Van Houten House, Montvale, New Jersey, listed on the NRHP in Bergen County
- Van Houten–Ackerman House (Wyckoff, New Jersey), listed on the NRHP in Bergen County
- Van Houten House (Paterson, New Jersey), listed on the NRHP in Passaic County
- Van Houten–Van Allen House, Totowa, New Jersey, listed on the NRHP in Passaic County
