= Vinny Ciurciu =

American football player (born 1980)

No. 44, 50, 54, 46, 52
- Position: Linebacker

Personal information
- Born: May 2, 1980 (age 46); Hackensack, New Jersey, U.S.
- Listed height: 6 ft 0 in (1.83 m)
- Listed weight: 240 lb (109 kg)

Career information
- High school: Saint Joseph Regional (Montvale, New Jersey)
- College: Boston College
- NFL draft: 2003: undrafted

Career history
- Carolina Panthers (2003)*; Tampa Bay Buccaneers (2003); Carolina Panthers (2003–2006); Minnesota Vikings (2007–2008); New England Patriots (2009)*; Detroit Lions (2009–2010)
- * Offseason or practice squad member only

Career NFL statistics
- Total tackles: 115
- Fumble recoveries: 1
- Pass deflections: 2
- Stats at Pro Football Reference

Vincenzo Ciurciu (born May 2, 1980) is an American former professional football player who was a linebacker in the National Football League (NFL). He was signed by the Carolina Panthers as an undrafted free agent in 2003. He played college football for the Boston College Eagles.

Ciurciu was also member of the Tampa Bay Buccaneers, Minnesota Vikings, New England Patriots and Detroit Lions.

== Early life ==
Ciurciu played high school football at Saint Joseph Regional High School in Montvale, New Jersey, after playing one season in Elmwood Park Memorial High School in Elmwood Park, New Jersey. He was garnished all-state honors at linebacker as a junior and senior. He rushed for 1,260 yards and 25 touchdowns his senior year.

== College career ==
Ciurciu began his college career at Clemson University as a freshman fullback in 1998. He played in 23 games between 1998 and 1999, totaling 30 carries, four catches, and one touchdown. After head coach Tommy West was fired from Clemson, Tommy Bowden was hired as head coach, and brought in a new offensive plan. This resulted in Ciurciu getting lost in the mix and prompted him to transfer to Boston College. He sat out the 2000 season at BC per transfer rules. Ciurciu moved to linebacker for the Eagles and led the team in tackles as a junior in 2001 with 87 tackles and two interceptions, and ranked second on team as a senior in 2002 with 102 tackles and one interception.

== Professional career ==
=== Carolina Panthers (first stint) ===
After going undrafted in the 2003 NFL draft, Ciurciu was signed by the Carolina Panthers on May 2, 2003, but was released on August 31, 2003. He was re-signed to the Panthers practice squad three days later.

=== Tampa Bay Buccaneers ===
On October 8, 2003, the Buccaneers signed Ciurciu off the Panthers practice squad to their active roster. He was released by the Buccaneers on December 2, 2003.

=== Carolina Panthers (second stint) ===
Ciurciu was re-signed to the Panthers practice squad on December 5, 2003. He was elevated to their active roster on December 20, where he spent the remainder of the regular season and the playoffs, including the Panthers' appearance in Super Bowl XXXVIII.

In 2004, Ciurciu played in all 16 games and started four games, for an injured Dan Morgan, at middle linebacker, and registered a career-high 33 tackles, 25 of them solo tackles. In three of his four starts, he had 7 or more tackles. In 2005, he ranked second on team with 14 special teams stops. His one start of the year came against Miami on September 25 at outside linebacker in place of Will Witherspoon. In 2006, he led Carolina with a career-best 18 special teams tackles 11 of them solo tackles, and again played in all 16 games.

=== Minnesota Vikings ===
Ciurciu signed with the Minnesota Vikings following the 2006 season. In 2007, he tied for second among Vikings with 15 special teams tackles despite missing three games during the season with injuries. In 2008, he played in 14 games with one start and totaled eight tackles. He was released by the Vikings in March 2009 after his total of tackles plummeted from 15 in 2007 to eight in 2008. At the finish of his career with Minnesota, Ciurciu appeared in 27 regular seasons games, totaling 23 tackles on special teams.

=== New England Patriots ===
The New England Patriots signed Ciurciu on May 4, 2009. He was released on September 4, 2009.

=== Detroit Lions ===
The Detroit Lions signed Ciurciu October 22, 2009. He was re-signed on March 5, 2010.

On September 3, 2011, it was announced that Vinny Ciurciu would be suspended from four regular season games for violating the league's substance abuse policy.
