= Van Barneveld (disambiguation) =

Van Barneveld is a Dutch surname. Notable people with the surname include:

- Harry Van Barneveld (born 1967), Belgian judoka
- Joos van Barneveld (born 1982), Dutch footballer and graffiti artist
- Raymond van Barneveld (born 1967), Dutch darts player
