= Krap (disambiguation) =

Krap is a Southeast Asian musical instrument.

Krap or KRAP may also refer to:

- KRAP, the ICAO airport code for Rapid City Regional Airport in South Dakota, United States
- KRAP, an American radio station
- Progressive Movement of Kosovar Roma, a political party in Kosovo
- Patrik Křap (born 1981), Czech footballer
