= 2001 UEFA European Under-18 Championship squads =

Player listings in youth football competition

== Group A ==
=== Czech Republic ===
Head coach:

No.	Pos.	Player	Date of birth (age)	Caps	Club
1			31 January 1982 (aged 19)		

=== FR Yugoslavia ===
Head coach:

No.	Pos.	Player	Date of birth (age)	Caps	Club

=== Ukraine ===
Head coach: (Ukraine) Valentyn Lutsenko

No.	Pos.	Player	Date of birth (age)	Caps	Club
	GK	Andriy Lazarchuk	27 May 1982 (aged 19)		(Ukraine) Kryvbas Kryvyi Rih
	GK	Rustam Khudzhamov	5 October 1982 (aged 18)		(Ukraine) Dynamo Kyiv
	DF	Anton Monakhov	31 January 1982 (aged 19)		(Russia) Spartak Moscow
	DF	Volodymyr Yalanskyi	7 January 1983 (aged 18)		(Ukraine) Dynamo Kyiv
	DF	Volodymyr Chernikov	15 January 1982 (aged 19)		(Ukraine) Dynamo Kyiv
	DF	Oleh Shkred	1 October 1982 (aged 18)		(Ukraine) FC Shakhtar Donetsk
	DF	Oleksandr Shevelyukhin	27 August 1982 (aged 18)		(Ukraine) Dynamo Kyiv
	DF	Yaroslav Karabkin	29 March 1982 (aged 19)		(Ukraine) Dynamo Kyiv
	DF	Pavlo Kutas	3 September 1982 (aged 18)		(Ukraine) Zakarpattia Uzhhorod
	MF	Ihor Skoba	21 May 1982 (aged 19)		(Ukraine) Dynamo Kyiv
	MF	Ruslan Yermolenko	18 October 1983 (aged 17)		(Ukraine) Dynamo Kyiv
	MF	Oleksiy Hai	6 November 1982 (aged 18)		(Ukraine) Shakhtar Donetsk
	MF	Dmytro Pinchuk	6 January 1982 (aged 19)		(Ukraine) Dynamo Kyiv
	MF	Vitaliy Lysytskyi	16 April 1982 (aged 19)		(Ukraine) Dynamo Kyiv
	MF	Serhiy Motuz	6 July 1982 (aged 19)		(Ukraine) Dynamo Kyiv
	FW	Kostyantyn Balabanov	13 August 1982 (aged 18)		(Ukraine) Chornomorets Odesa
	FW	Serhiy Ponomarenko	20 February 1982 (aged 19)		(Ukraine) Chornomorets Odesa
	FW	Andriy Draholyuk	26 June 1982 (aged 19)		(Ukraine) Karpaty Lviv

=== Finland ===
Head coach:

No.	Pos.	Player	Date of birth (age)	Caps	Club

== Group B ==
=== Poland ===
Head coach:

No.	Pos.	Player	Date of birth (age)	Caps	Club

=== Spain ===
Head coach:

No.	Pos.	Player	Date of birth (age)	Caps	Club

=== Belgium ===
Head coach:

No.	Pos.	Player	Date of birth (age)	Caps	Club

=== Denmark ===
Head coach:

No.	Pos.	Player	Date of birth (age)	Caps	Club
