= Akerboom =

Akerboom is a surname. Notable people with the surname include:

- Kees Akerboom Jr. (born 1983), Dutch basketball player, son of Kees Akerboom Sr.
- Kees Akerboom Sr. (born 1952), Dutch basketball player
- Marcel Akerboom (born 1981), Dutch footballer
