= Verno (disambiguation) =

Verno is a mountain in Greece.

Verno may also refer to:

- Buz Verno (born 1953), American musician
- Ilpo Verno (born 1981), Finnish footballer
- Jerry Verno (1895–1975), English actor
- Verno Phillips (born 1969), Belizean boxer
