= Niskala =

Niskala is a Finnish surname. Notable people with the surname include:

- Janne Niskala (born 1981), Finnish ice hockey player
- Mika Niskala (born 1981), Finnish footballer
