= Hout =

Hout, van Hout and van den Hout are Dutch surnames meaning "wood", "timber" or "of the wood". Notable people with the surname include:

== Hout ==
- Michael Hout (born 1950), American sociologist
- Morgan Hout (born 1940s), American football coach

== Van Hout ==
- Cor van Hout (1957–2003), Dutch kidnapper
- Jan van Hout (1542–1609), Dutch statesman, "city secretary" of Leiden
- Jan van Hout (1908–1945), Dutch racing cyclist
- Joris Van Hout (born 1977), Belgian footballer
- Kristof Van Hout (born 1987), Belgian football goalkeeper
- Léon van Hout (1864–1945), Belgian violinist and music educator
- Roald van Hout (born 1988), Dutch footballer
- Ronnie van Hout (born 1962), New Zealand artist
- Russell Van Hout (born 1976), Australian former racing cyclist

== Van den Hout ==
- Ron van den Hout (born 1964), Dutch Roman Catholic bishop
- Theo van den Hout (born 1953), Dutch-American historian
- Willem van den Hout (1915–1985), Dutch writer and publicist

== Al-Hout ==
"(Al-)Hout" is a common romanization of the Arabic surname ال)حوت) (al)-ḥūt, meaning "(the) whale". People with this name include:

- Shafiq al-Hout (1932–2009), Palestinian politician and writer, a founder of the Palestine Liberation Front and the Palestine Liberation Organization

== See also ==
- Houts, surname including "van Houts"
- Van Houten, Dutch surname
