= Chuck DeVleigher =

American football player (born 1947)

No. 74
- Position: Defensive tackle

Personal information
- Born: January 2, 1947 (age 79); Paterson, New Jersey, U.S.
- Listed height: 6 ft 4 in (1.93 m)
- Listed weight: 265 lb (120 kg)

Career information
- High school: Elmwood Park (NJ)
- College: Memphis State
- NFL draft: 1968: 14th round, 361st overall pick

Career history
- Buffalo Bills (1968–1969)
- Stats at Pro Football Reference

Charles DeVleigher (born January 2, 1947) is an American former professional football player who was a defensive tackle for the Buffalo Bills of National Football League (NFL). He played college football for the University of Memphis.

Raised in East Paterson, New Jersey (since renamed as Elmwood Park), he played prep football at East Paterson Memorial High School.
