= Elmwood Park Memorial High School =

High school in Bergen County, New Jersey, US

Location
- 375 River Drive; Elmwood Park, Bergen County, New Jersey 07407; United States; 40.909255°N 74.131148°W

Information
- Type: Public high school
- Established: 1957
- School district: Elmwood Park Public Schools
- NCES School ID: 340466000368
- Principal: Corinne DiMartino
- Faculty: 48.6 FTEs
- Grades: 9–12
- Enrollment: 823 (as of 2024–25)
- Student to teacher ratio: 17.0:1
- Campus: Suburban
- Colors: Scarlet and white
- Athletics conference: North Jersey Interscholastic Conference
- Team name: Crusaders
- Accreditation: Middle States Association of Colleges and Schools
- Newspaper: The Scarlet Quill
- Website: www.elmwoodparkschools.org/o/epmhs

Elmwood Park Memorial High School is a four-year comprehensive public high school that serves students in ninth through twelfth grade from Elmwood Park, in Bergen County, in the U.S. state of New Jersey, operating as the lone secondary school of the Elmwood Park Public Schools. The school has been accredited by the Middle States Association of Colleges and Schools Commission on Elementary and Secondary Schools since 1963.

As of the 2024–25 school year, the school had an enrollment of 823 students and 48.6 classroom teachers (on an FTE basis), for a student–teacher ratio of 17.0:1. There were 347 students (42.2% of enrollment) eligible for free lunch and 64 (7.8% of students) eligible for reduced-cost lunch.

== History ==
Before the district opened its own high school, students from East Paterson had been sent to attend Lodi High School until 1953 and then were shifted to East Rutherford High School starting in 1954 due to lack of capacity at the Lodi school.

East Paterson Memorial High School opened in September 1957 with 1,075 students in grades 7-10 attending split sessions, to allow for the construction of unfinished portions of the complex.

== Awards, recognition and rankings ==
The school was the 214th-ranked public high school in New Jersey out of 339 schools statewide in New Jersey Monthly magazine's September 2014 cover story on the state's "Top Public High Schools", using a new ranking methodology. The school had been ranked 248th in the state of 328 schools in 2012, after being ranked 210th in 2010 out of 322 schools listed. The magazine ranked the school 201st in 2008 out of 316 schools. The school was ranked 237th in the magazine's September 2006 issue, which surveyed 316 schools across the state.

== Athletics ==
The Elmwood Park High School Crusaders participate in the North Jersey Interscholastic Conference (NJIC), which is comprised of small-enrollment schools in Bergen, Hudson, Morris and Passaic counties, and was created following a reorganization of sports leagues in Northern New Jersey by the New Jersey State Interscholastic Athletic Association (NJSIAA). Prior to realignment that took effect in the fall of 2010, Elmwood Park was a member of the smaller Bergen-Passaic Scholastic League (BPSL). With 536 students in grades 10-12, the school was classified by the NJSIAA for the 2019–20 school year as Group II for most athletic competition purposes, which included schools with an enrollment of 486 to 758 students in that grade range. The school was classified by the NJSIAA as Group II North for football for 2024–2026, which included schools with 484 to 683 students.

The wrestling team won the North I Group II state championship in 1982 and 1986. In 2006, the team won the BPSL Championship, had a record of 22–2 for the season, were semifinalists in the state sectionals, and ranked top ten in Bergen County.

The high school's football team had a 41-game losing streak that lasted from 2002 until September 30, 2006, when they defeated the Manchester Regional High School Falcons, 33–14, snapping the four-year-long losing streak that was North Jersey's longest for a football team.

After going 20 years without a winning record, the Elmwood Park High School baseball team went 19–6 in 2006, winning the league championship and doubling their wins every year for three seasons. They were semifinalist in the state tournament and county qualifiers.

The 2003 boys' basketball team won the North I, Group I state sectional title, their first championship since 1984, with a 70–56 win against Park Ridge High School in the tournament final. The boys' basketball team won the North I, Group I state championship in 2007, defeating Leonia High School 78–70 in a game played at Hudson Catholic Regional High School.

== Administration ==
The school's principal is Corinne DiMartino. Core members of the school's administration include the two assistant principals.

== Notable alumni ==
- Vinny Ciurciu (born 1980), former linebacker who played in the NFL for the Detroit Lions, Minnesota Vikings, New England Patriots and Tampa Bay Buccaneers
- Chuck DeVleigher (born 1947), former professional football player who was a defensive tackle for the Buffalo Bills
- Cora-Ann Mihalik (born c. 1954; class of 1972), former television news anchor and reporter who was best known for her role as co-anchor and news reporter for Fox WNYW and My 9 WWOR from 1987 to 2011
