= Cora-Ann Mihalik =

Television news anchor and reporter

- Born: Cora-Ann Mihalik; 1954 (age 71–72); USA
- Education: William Paterson University
- Occupations: TV news anchor and reporter
- Notable credit(s): WNYW; WWOR

Cora-Ann Mihalik (born c. 1954) is an Emmy Award-winning former television news anchor and reporter who was best known for her role as co-anchor and news reporter for Fox WNYW and My 9 WWOR since 1987. Her career at Fox/My 9 concluded in 2011 when her contract expired.

== Biography ==
Mihalik grew up in East Paterson, New Jersey, and graduated in 1972 from East Paterson Memorial High School (which has since been renamed as Elmwood Park Memorial High School).

She graduated from William Paterson University in Wayne, New Jersey, and from there was hired by many networks. She began in WGGB-TV in Springfield, Massachusetts, then solely owned by ABC, where she was the first female television news anchor and reporter. She moved to WHP-TV in Harrisburg where she also was a news anchor. After Harrisburg, she continued her career in Cleveland for WJKW. Following her short stay in Cleveland, she moved to WTCN in Minneapolis where she was the first female news anchor. From there she went to WLS-TV in Chicago. She then was hired by the FOX network in 1987 where she was the first national news anchor for FOX news updates called FOX News Extra which were produced at New York City O&O WNYW. While at WNYW, Mihalik co-anchored the 7pm and 10pm weekday newscasts. She was one of the original reporters and fill-in anchors for the FOX television show, A Current Affair. Following maternity leave in 1998, she returned to work solely at My 9 WWOR as a weekday reporter and weekend anchor until 2011.

Mihalik has been involved in telethons including The Leukemia Televent and the Jerry Lewis Telethon For Muscular Dystrophy.

Mihalik lives in New York with her husband, Arthur, and their two children, Aurora and Tanner.

== Awards ==
Cora-Ann Mihalik received a New York Emmy Award on January 15, 2009, for Outstanding Event Newscast over 35 Minutes, "Miracle on the Hudson," while working at My 9 WWOR-TV. She also won a New York Emmy Award on November 12, 2001, for Outstanding Coverage of an Instant Breaking News Story, "Crash of Flight 587." Other honors include four New Jersey First Place Associated Press Broadcasting Association Awards for "Hurricane Isabel" (2003), "Blizzard of 2003" (2003), "Bridge Fire - Wall Collapse" (2005), "Bronx Fatal Fire" (2007).
