= Van Houten =

- Pronunciation: vɑn ˈhʌutən
- Gender: Unisex
- Language: Dutch

Origin
- Meaning: from Houten

Van Houten is a Dutch toponymic surname.

The name literally means "from Houten" which refers to the town of Houten in the Netherlands. In 1947, there were 2,736 people with this surname in the Netherlands and 4,283 people in 2007.

== Notable people ==
Notable people with the surname include:

- Barbara Elisabeth van Houten (1863–1950), Dutch painter
- Byron Collins Van Houten (1848–1904), U.S. politician
- Carice van Houten (born 1976), Dutch actress, daughter of Theodore
- Coenraad Johannes van Houten (1801–1887), Dutch chocolate maker
- Connie Van Houten, American politician
- Cornelis Johannes van Houten (1920–2002), Dutch astronomer
- Frans van Houten (born 1960), Dutch business manager
- Gerrit van Houten (1866–1934), Dutch painter
- Harm van Houten (1892–1952), Dutch politician
- Ingrid van Houten-Groeneveld (1921–2015), Dutch astronomer
- Isaac B. Van Houten (1776–1850), U.S. politician
- Jelka van Houten (born 1978), Dutch actress, daughter of Theodore
- John G. Van Houten (1904–1974), U.S. Army general
- John J. Van Houten Jr., U.S. tuba player
- Leslie Van Houten (born 1949), former member of Charles Manson's crime family
- Robert Van Houten (1905–1986), U.S. professor
- Samuel van Houten (1837–1930), Dutch liberal politician
- Sebastiaan van Houten (born 1975), U.S. author and 'fangsmith'
- Sina Mesdag-van Houten (1834–1909), Dutch painter
- Theodore van Houten (1952–2016), Dutch-British author and radio and theater producer

== Fictional characters ==
Fictional characters with the surname are:

- Elhaym Van Houten, the main heroine from the Xenogears series
- Milhouse Van Houten, character from The Simpsons
- Peter Van Houten, character from the book The Fault in Our Stars by John Green
- Pelle van Houten, Creator of major company "Dinosaurs R' Us" in show 'Rick and Morty'

== See also ==
- Van Houten's Cocoa, chocolate powder brand originally made by Coenraad van Houten
- 1673 van Houten, main belt asteroid named after Cornelis J. van Houten
- 271P/van Houten–Lemmon, a comet discovered by C.J. van Houten and Ingrid van Houten-Groeneveld
- USS Jasmine, a Union Navy ship originally called the Peter B. Van Houten
- Van Houten House (disambiguation), historic houses
