= Elmwood Park Public Schools =

School district in Bergen County, New Jersey, US

Address
- 60 East 53rd Street Elmwood Park, Bergen County, New Jersey, 07407; United States
- Coordinates: 40.902267°N 74.116652°W

District information
- Grades: pre-K to 12
- Superintendent: Anthony Iachetti
- Business administrator: Mark S. Jacobus
- Schools: 5

Students and staff
- Enrollment: 2,586 (as of 2020–21)
- Faculty: 195.9 FTEs
- Student–teacher ratio: 13.2:1

Other information
- District Factor Group: CD
- Website: www.elmwoodparkschools.org
Ind.	Per pupil	District spending	Rank (*)	K-12 average	%± vs. average
1A	Total Spending	$14,543	2	$18,891	−23.0%
1	Budgetary Cost	9,469	1	14,783	−35.9%
2	Classroom Instruction	5,015	1	8,763	−42.8%
6	Support Services	1,562	5	2,392	−34.7%
8	Administrative Cost	1,494	32	1,485	0.6%
10	Operations & Maintenance	1,105	3	1,783	−38.0%
13	Extracurricular Activities	199	2	268	−25.7%
16	Median Teacher Salary	54,360	1	64,043
Data from NJDoE 2014 Taxpayers' Guide to Education Spending. *Of K-12 districts with 1,800-3,500 students. Lowest spending=1; Highest=68

Elmwood Park Public Schools is a comprehensive community public school district that serves students in pre-kindergarten through twelfth grade from Elmwood Park, in Bergen County, in the U.S. state of New Jersey.

As of the 2020–21 school year, the district, comprising five schools, had an enrollment of 2,586 students and 195.9 classroom teachers (on an FTE basis), for a student–teacher ratio of 13.2:1.

The district is classified by the New Jersey Department of Education as being in District Factor Group "CD", the sixth-highest of eight groupings. District Factor Groups organize districts statewide to allow comparison by common socioeconomic characteristics of the local districts. From lowest socioeconomic status to highest, the categories are A, B, CD, DE, FG, GH, I and J.

== Schools ==
Schools in the district (with 2020–21 enrollment data from the National Center for Education Statistics) are:

Elementary schools

- Gantner Avenue Elementary School with 327 students in grades K-5
  - Allison Jackter, principal
- Gilbert Avenue Elementary School with 392 students in grades K-5
  - Karen Fasouletos, principal
- Sixteenth Avenue Elementary School with 427 students in grades PreK-5
  - Dominick Silla, principal

Middle school

- Memorial Middle School with 643 students in grades 6-8
  - Corinne DiMartino, principal

High school

- Elmwood Park Memorial High School with 742 students in grades 9-12
  - David Warner, principal

== Athletics ==
The high school's football team had a 41-game losing streak that extended from 2002 until September 30, 2006, when they defeated the Manchester Regional High School Falcons, 33-14, snapping the four-year-long losing streak.

== Administration ==
Core members of the district's administration are:

- Anthony Iachetti, superintendent
- Mark S. Jacobus, business administrator and board secretary

Tom Egan was appointed as fiscal monitor in August 2013 by Secretary of Education Christopher Cerf to address a persistent imbalance in the district's finances, which ended in deficit for two consecutive school years. Egan was replaced by Angela DeSimone in January 2015.

== Board of education ==
The district's board of education is composed of nine members who set policy and oversee the fiscal and educational operation of the district through its administration. As a Type II school district, the board's trustees are elected directly by voters to serve three-year terms of office on a staggered basis, with three seats up for election each year held (since 2012) as part of the November general election. The board appoints a superintendent to oversee the district's day-to-day operations and a business administrator to supervise the business functions of the district.
