= Ukraine national under-18 football team =

National association football team

Ukraine under-18
- Association: Ukrainian Association of Football
- Head coach: Oleksandr Sytnyk
First colours	Second colours	Third colours

First international
- Israel 2 - 0 Ukraine; Israel (1993)

Biggest win
- Ukraine 5 - 1 Georgia; Israel (1993); Ukraine 5 - 1 Armenia; Ukraine (1994)

Biggest defeat
- Israel 2 - 0 Ukraine; Israel (1993); Switzerland 2 - 0 Ukraine; Malta (1997)

European Championship
- Appearances: 2 (first in 2000)
- Best result: Finalist (2000)

The Ukraine national under-18 football team (Ukrainian: Юнацька збірна України з футболу (U-18)) is one of several junior national teams of the Ukrainian Association of Football. It serves as a reserve of under-19 team in preparation to continental under-19 football competitions. Until 2001 it served as the base team, before UEFA transitioned competitions to under-19 age requirements.

== History ==
=== Head coaches ===
- 1993–1994 Anatoliy Konkov (assistants: Valeriy Shvedyuk and Mykhailo Vilkhovyi)
- 1999–2000 Anatoliy Kroshchenko
- 2001 Valentyn Lutsenko
- 2026 Oleksandr Sytnyk

=== European championship ===
UEFA European Under-18 Championship									Round 2 play-offs					
Year	Round	GP	W	D*	L	GF	GA	Squad	GP	W	D	L	GF	GA
(England) 1993	did not enter								did not enter					
(Spain) 1994	Did not qualify								2	1	0	1	2	2
(Greece) 1995	Did not qualify								2	1	0	1	3	3
(France) 1996	Did not qualify								Qualification round					
(Iceland) 1997	Did not qualify								Qualification round					
(Cyprus) 1998	Did not qualify								Qualification round					
(Sweden) 1999	Did not qualify								Qualification round					
(Germany) 2000	Runners-up	4	2	1	1	3	2	Squad	2	1	1	0	3	2
(Finland) 2001	Group stage	3	0	1	2	4	6	Squad	2	1	1	0	2	1
Total:2/8	Runners-up	7	2	2	3	7	8		8	4	2	2	10	8

In 2001 Ukraine U-18 qualified for the 2001 FIFA World Youth Championship.

=== Honours ===
- Continental competitions (UEFA European Under-18 Football Championship):
  - runners-up (1): 2000

== Recent results ==
=== 2026 ===
4 June 2026 International friendly tournament	Ukraine	0–0	Finland	Municipal Stadium Chakovec (Croatie)

4 June 2026 International friendly tournament	Norway	1–1	Ukraine	Municipal Stadium Chakovec (Croatie)
16:00	Rid 15'		Gustey 27'

9 June 2026 International friendly tournament	Turkey	0-1	Ukraine	Municipal Stadium Chakovec (Croatie)
			Bagriy 28'

23 September 2026 International friendly tournament for U-18 national teams	Japan	2–1	Ukraine	Stade de Beaublanc.Limoges (France).
16:00	Yuzo Takeuchi 47'; Ryotaro Inouchi 90+7'		Oleksandr Goch 31'	Referee: Gaël Gratianne

25 September 2026 International friendly tournament for U-18 national teams	France	1–0	Ukraine	Stade de Beaublanc.Limoges (France).
20:00

27 September 2026 International friendly tournament for U-18 national teams	Ukraine	4–1	Austria	Stade de Beaublanc.Limoges (France).
15:00

== See also ==
- Ukraine national football team
- Ukraine national under-21 football team
- Ukraine national under-19 football team
