= Van Houten–Ackerman House (Wyckoff, New Jersey) =

United States historic house in New Jersey

- U.S. National Register of Historic Places
- New Jersey Register of Historic Places
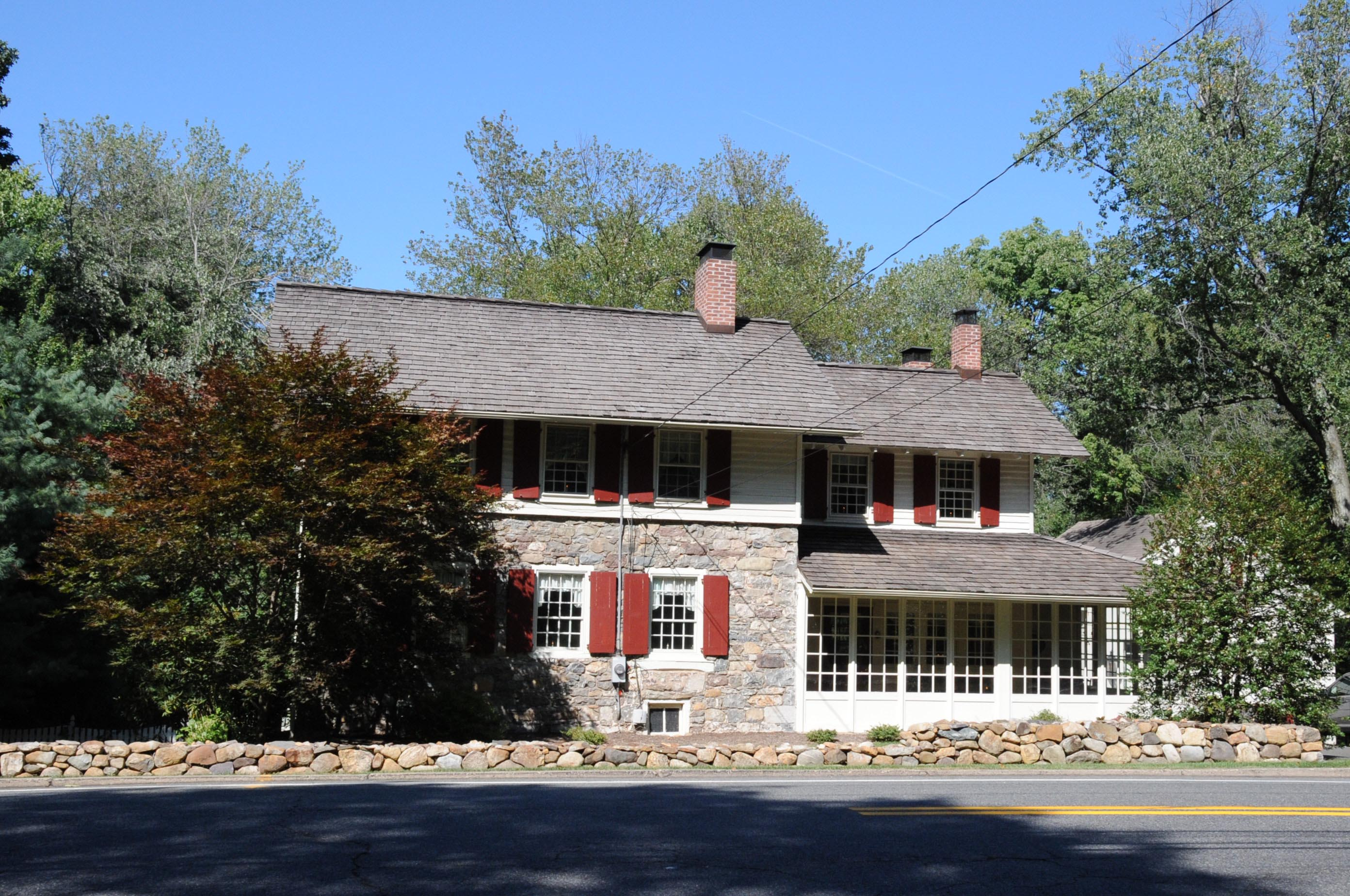

- Location within Bergen County, New Jersey Location within New Jersey Location within the United States
- Location: 480 Sicomac Avenue, Wyckoff, New Jersey
- Coordinates: 40°59′24″N 74°11′7″W
- Area: 2.1 acres (0.85 ha)
- MPS: Stone Houses of Bergen County TR
- NRHP reference No.: 83001574
- NJRHP No.: 741

Significant dates
- Added to NRHP: January 10, 1983
- Designated NJRHP: October 3, 1980

The Van Houten–Ackerman House is a historic stone house located at 480 Sicomac Avenue in the township of Wyckoff in Bergen County, New Jersey, United States. The 18th-century house was added to the National Register of Historic Places on January 10, 1983, for its significance in architecture. It was listed as part of the Early Stone Houses of Bergen County Multiple Property Submission (MPS).

The house may be first Van Houten house in the area. It was purchased by John Van Houten in 1859. His sister, Maria, married David Ackerman.

== See also ==
- National Register of Historic Places listings in Wyckoff, New Jersey
- National Register of Historic Places listings in Bergen County, New Jersey
