= Houts =

Houts or van Houts is a surname. Notable people with the surname include:

- Ashley Houts (born 1987), American basketball player
- Marshall Houts (1919–1993), American academic, author, and attorney
- Rudi van Houts (born 1984), Dutch road cyclist and mountain biker

== See also ==
- Hout
