= Thijs Houwing =

Dutch footballer

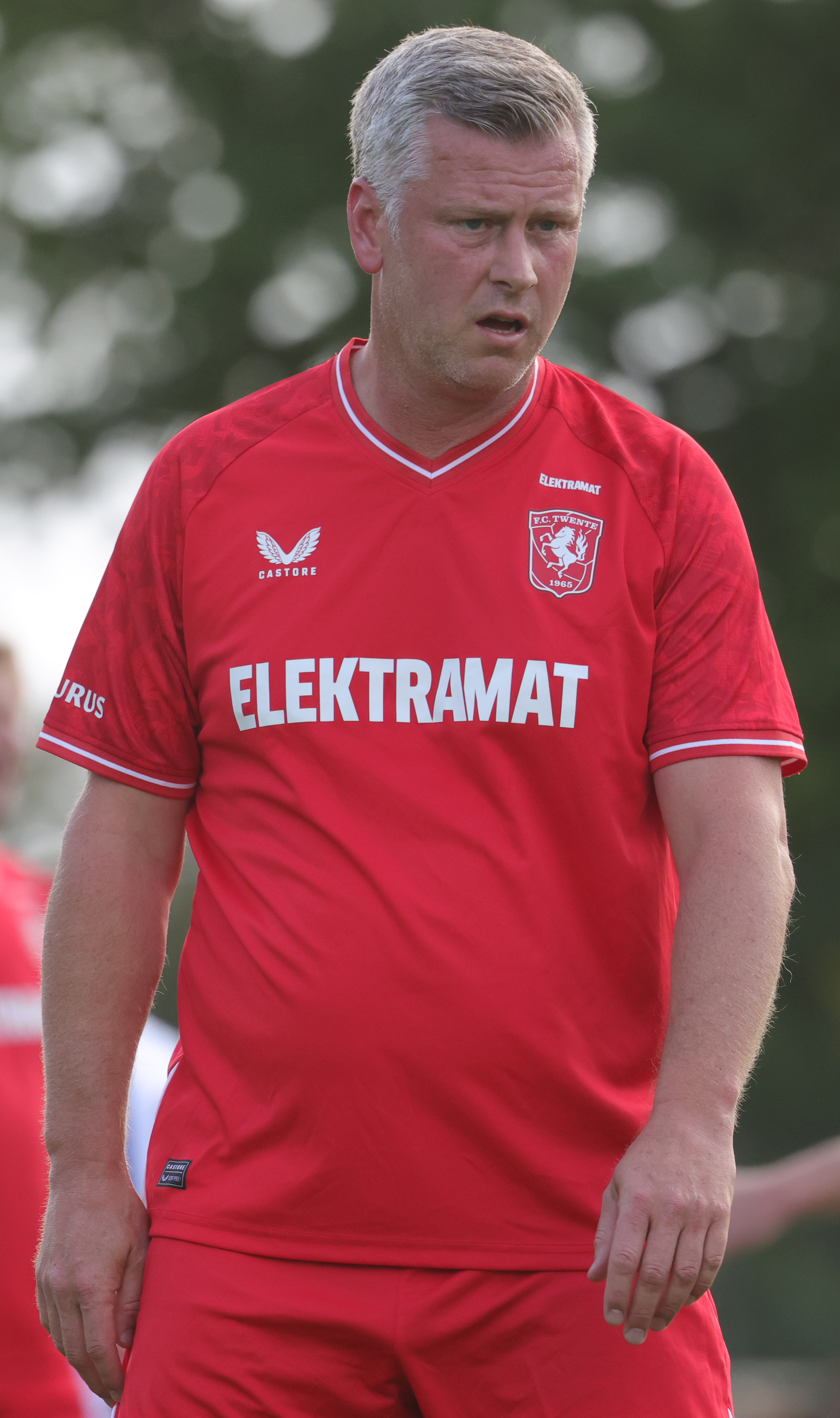
- Houwing (2025)

Personal information
- Date of birth: 22 April 1981 (age 45)
- Place of birth: Vasse, Netherlands
- Position: Striker

Youth career
- Twente

Senior career*
Years	Team	Apps	(Gls)
1999–2003	Twente	81	(12)
2003–2004	De Graafschap	19	(0)
2004–2006	Cambuur	47	(6)
2006–2007	Kozakken Boys		
2007–2011	Spakenburg		
2011–2013	HHC	44	(15)
2013–2014	DOS'37		
Total		191	(33)

International career
1997	Netherlands U16	7	(3)
1997	Netherlands U17	6	(0)
1998-1999	Netherlands U18	5	(2)
1999-2000	Netherlands U19	15	(6)
2000-2001	Netherlands U21	3	(1)
- * Club domestic league appearances and goals

Thijs Houwing (born 22 April 1981) is a Dutch retired footballer who played as a striker.

== Playing career ==
=== Club career ===
Born in Vasse, Houwing began his career with Twente, scoring on his professional debut on 26 March 2000. He also played professionally for De Graafschap and Cambuur.

Houwing later played for Kozakken Boys, SV Spakenburg, HHC Hardenberg and DOS'37.

=== International career ===
Houwing played 6 games for the Netherlands national under-17 football team, 15 for the U19s and represented the Netherlands at the 2001 FIFA World Youth Championship, making 4 appearances in the tournament.

== Later career ==
While playing part-time for SV Spakenburg, Houwing also worked in the marketing department at Heracles Almelo. He had previously studied Commercial Sport Economics at the Johan Cruyff University.

Houwing was coach at amateur sides SV Almelo, SC Markelo and took op the position at VV Twenthe in November 2026. He lives in Goor.
