= Mikko Rahkamaa =

Finnish footballer (born 1981)

Personal information
- Date of birth: 21 September 1981 (age 45)
- Place of birth: Oulu, Finland
- Height: 1.91 m (6 ft 3 in)
- Position: Goalkeeper

Youth career
- 1992–1996: OLS

Senior career*
Years	Team	Apps	(Gls)
1997–1998	OPS	0	(0)
1999	Tervarit	14	(0)
2000–2001	Jokerit	11	(0)
2002–2004	Twente	2	(0)
2004–2006	Go Ahead Eagles	53	(0)
2007	Viikingit	0	(0)
2007	→ Kontu (loan)	1	(0)
2007	→ GBK Kokkola (loan)	2	(0)

International career
1999	Finland U18	1	(0)
2000	Finland U19	2	(8)
2002–2003	Finland U21	5	(0)
- * Club domestic league appearances and goals

Mikko Rahkamaa (born 21 September 1981) is a Finnish former professional footballer, who played as a goalkeeper.

== Career statistics ==
Appearances and goals by club, season and competition
Club	Season	League			Europe		Total	
Club	Season	Division	Apps	Goals	Apps	Goals	Apps	Goals
OPS	1997	Kakkonen	0	0	–		0	0
OPS	1998	Kakkonen	0	0	–		0	0
Tervarit	1999	Kakkonen	14	0	–		14	0
Jokerit	2000	Veikkausliiga	0	0	0	0	0	0
Jokerit	2001	Veikkausliiga	11	0	2 (Note: Appearances in UEFA Cup)	0	13	0
Jokerit	Total		11	0	3	0	14	0
Twente	2001–02	Eredivisie	2	0	–		2	0
Twente	2002–03	Eredivisie	0	0	–		0	0
Twente	Total		2	0	0	0	2	0
Go Ahead Eagles	2004–05	Eerste Divisie	34	0	–		34	0
Go Ahead Eagles	2005–06	Eerste Divisie	19	0	–		19	0
Go Ahead Eagles	Total		53	0	0	0	53	0
Viikingit	2007	Veikkausliiga	0	0	–		0	0
Kontu (loan)	2007	Kakkonen	1	0	–		1	0
GBK Kokkola (loan)	2007	Ykkönen	2	0	–		2	0
Career total			83	0	2	0	85	0
