= Oleksandr Shevelyukhin =

Ukrainian footballer (born 1982)

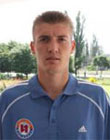
- Shevelyukhin in 2009

Personal information
- Full name: Oleksandr Anatoliyovych Shevelyukhin
- Date of birth: 27 August 1982 (age 44)
- Place of birth: Kozyn, Ukrainian SSR
- Height: 1.92 m (6 ft 3 1/2 in)
- Position: Defender

Youth career
- Dynamo Kyiv Youth

Senior career*
Years	Team	Apps	(Gls)
1997–2002	Dynamo Kyiv	0	(0)
1997–2002	→ Dynamo-3 Kyiv	68	(0)
1998–2002	→ Dynamo-2 Kyiv	40	(0)
2002–2003	CSKA Kyiv	15	(0)
2003	Kryvbas Kryvyi Rih	13	(1)
2003	→ Kryvbas-2 Kryvyi Rih	2	(0)
2004	Vorskla Poltava	11	(0)
2004	Zakarpattia Uzhhorod	8	(2)
2005–2007	Kryvbas Kryvyi Rih	32	(2)
2007–2008	Illichivets Mariupol	27	(3)
2008	→ Illichivets-2 Mariupol	1	(0)
2008	FC Lviv	10	(0)
2009	Volyn Lutsk	7	(1)
2010–2012	Sevastopol	54	(0)
2012–2018	Górnik Zabrze	112	(6)
2018–2019	Rymer Rybnik	19	(4)
2019–2021	Karkonosze Jelenia Góra	13	(0)
2022	Silesia Lubomia	10	(1)
Total		442	(20)

International career
1999–2000	Ukraine U17	3	(0)

Managerial career
- 2019–2021: Karkonosze Jelenia Góra (player-manager)
- 2022–2023: ROW 1964 Rybnik
- 2026: ROW 1964 Rybnik
- * Club domestic league appearances and goals

Oleksandr Shevelyukhin (Ukrainian: Олександр Анатолійович Шевелюхін; born 27 August 1982) is a Ukrainian professional football manager and former player who played as a defender. He was most recently the manager of III liga club ROW 1964 Rybnik.

== Club career ==
He moved to Illichivets Mariupol from Kryvbas Kryvyi Rih during the start of the 2007–08 transfer season. Shevelyukhin is the product of Dynamo Kyiv Youth School system.

== Managerial statistics ==
As of match played 6 June 2026

Managerial record by team and tenure
Team	From	To	Record							
Team	From	To	G	W	D	L	GF	GA	GD	Win %
Karkonosze Jelenia Góra (player-manager)	13 July 2019	18 October 2021	77	50	9	18	187	77	+110	64.94
ROW 1964 Rybnik	1 July 2022	11 January 2023	17	8	1	8	35	30	+5	47.06
ROW 1964 Rybnik	5 January 2026	2 July 2026	18	16	1	1	53	17	+36	88.89
Total			112	74	11	27	275	124	+151	66.07

== Honours ==
=== Player-manager ===
Karkonosze Jelenia Góra

- IV liga Lower Silesia West: 2020–21
- Polish Cup (Jelenia Góra regionals): 2020–21

=== Manager ===
ROW 1964 Rybnik

- IV liga Silesia: 2025–26
