= Christian Fickert =

German footballer

Personal information
- Date of birth: 10 February 1981 (age 45)
- Place of birth: Mannheim, West Germany
- Height: 1.87 m (6 ft 2 in)
- Position: Defender

Youth career
- 1986–1999: SV Waldhof Mannheim

Senior career*
Years	Team	Apps	(Gls)
1999–2003	SV Waldhof Mannheim	62	(2)
2003	Rot-Weiss Essen	0	(0)
2003–2008	SV Sandhausen	105	(4)
2009–2011	SpVgg Neckarelz	28	(0)
2011–2013	TDSV Mutterstadt		
2013–2014	BSC Mückenloch		
2014–?	SpVgg Wallstadt		

International career
1999–2000	Germany U18		
2000–2001	Germany U20		

Managerial career
- 2013–2014: BSC Mückenloch (playing manager)
- * Club domestic league appearances and goals

Christian Fickert (born 10 February 1981) is a German former footballer who played as a defender.

He was in the German squad for the 2001 FIFA World Youth Championship, but didn't make an appearance.
