= Van Houten–Hillman House =

United States historic house in New Jersey

- U.S. National Register of Historic Places
- New Jersey Register of Historic Places
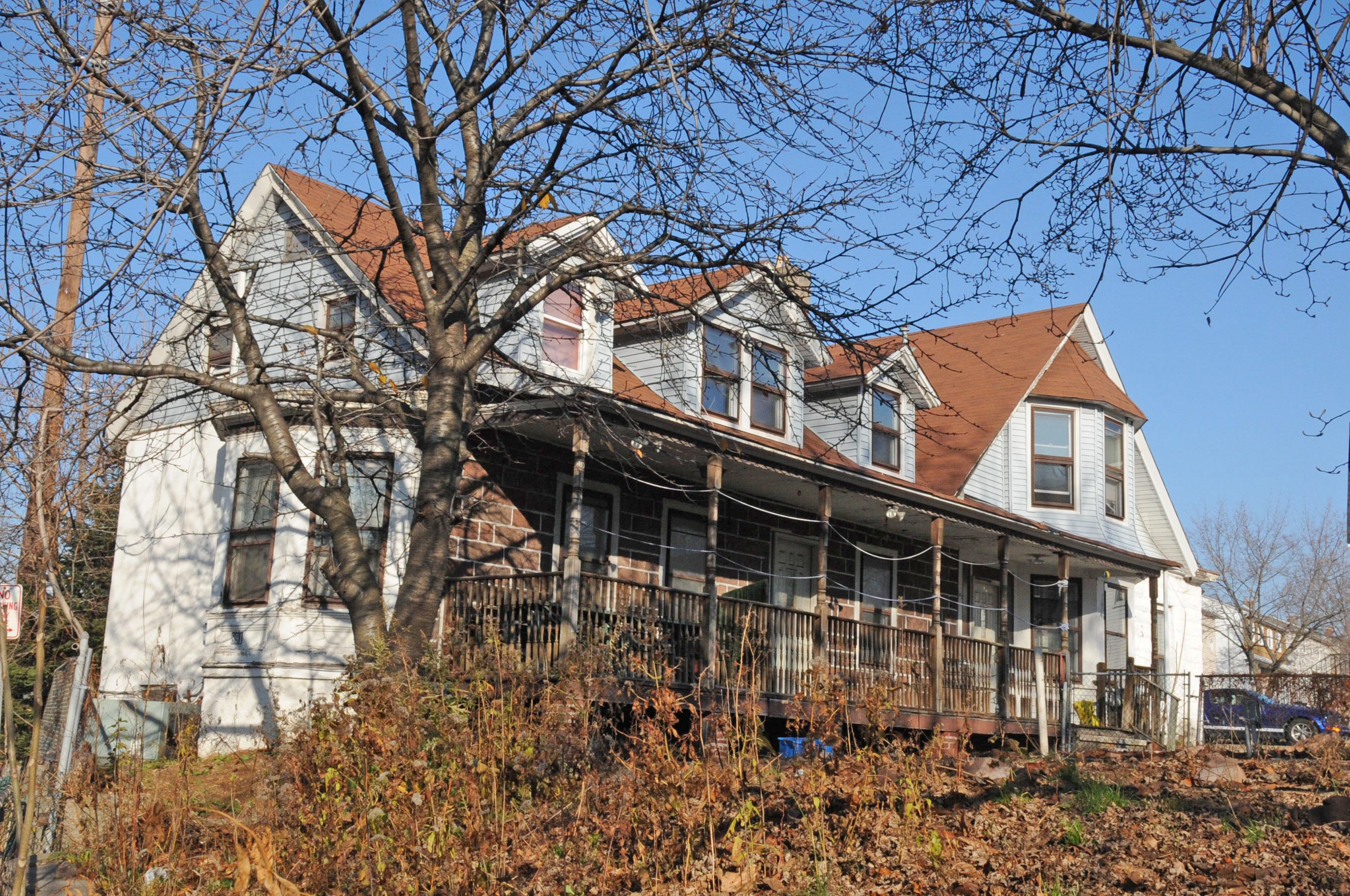

- Location within Bergen County, New Jersey Location within New Jersey Location within the United States
- Location: 891 River Road, Elmwood Park, New Jersey
- Coordinates: 40°53′26″N 74°7′39.65″W
- MPS: Stone Houses of Bergen County TR
- NRHP reference No.: 83001575
- NJRHP No.: 469

Significant dates
- Added to NRHP: January 9, 1983
- Designated NJRHP: October 3, 1980

The Van Houten–Hillman House is located at 891 River Road in the borough of Elmwood Park in Bergen County, New Jersey, United States. The historic stone house was added to the National Register of Historic Places on January 9, 1983, for its significance in architecture. It was listed as part of the Early Stone Houses of Bergen County Multiple Property Submission (MPS).

According to the nomination form, the house was built in the mid 18th century, possibly by a member of the Cadmus family. It may also have built around 1782 by Cornelius J. Van Houten. Herman Hillman purchased the house in 1888, and remodeled it in 1901.

== See also ==
- National Register of Historic Places listings in Bergen County, New Jersey
