= Jukka Sauso =

Finnish footballer (born 1982)

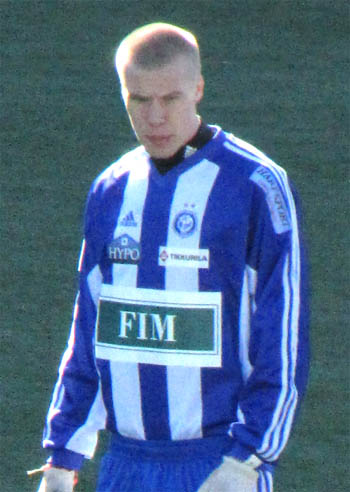

Personal information
- Full name: Pekka Jukka Sauso
- Date of birth: 20 June 1982 (age 44)
- Place of birth: Vaasa, Finland
- Height: 1.90 m (6 ft 3 in)
- Position: Central defender

Team information
- Current team: Jönköpings Södra IF
- Number: 8

Youth career
- 1988–2000: VPS

Senior career*
Years	Team	Apps	(Gls)
2000–2004	VPS	60	(2)
2005	Hämeenlinna	26	(2)
2005–2007	Örgryte	58	(3)
2007–2010	HJK	43	(0)
2010–2011	Jönköpings Södra	29	(0)

International career^{‡}
2005–2006	Finland	5	(0)
- * Club domestic league appearances and goals as of 26 November 2021 ‡ National team caps and goals as of 2 September 2006

Jukka Sauso (born 20 June 1982) is a Finnish former footballer.

Sauso is a big and strong central defender, but is often used as a last minute solution up front because of his notorious heading skills. When Sauso was playing for Örgryte IS in the Swedish Allsvenskan in 2006, he also started some matches as a striker.

Sauso played for Vaasan Palloseura and FC Hämeenlinna in Veikkausliiga before moving to Sweden and Örgryte for the 2005 season. He was a big hit in his first season in Allsvenskan and was near to move to Wisła Kraków. After playing two seasons in Allsvenskan and a third in Superettan for Örgryte, he moved back to Finland for the 2008 season.

Sauso was promoted to the Finland national team in 2005. He was also a part of the Finland squad at the 2001 FIFA World Youth Championship.

== Career statistics ==
As of 1 September 2024.

Appearances and goals by club, season and competition
Club	Season	League			Cup (Note: Includes Suomen Cup and Svenska Cupen)		League cup (Note: Includes Finnish League Cup)		Europe		Total	
Club	Season	Division	Apps	Goals	Apps	Goals	Apps	Goals	Apps	Goals	Apps	Goals
VPS	2000	Veikkausliiga	7	0	–		–		–		7	0
VPS	2001	Veikkausliiga	16	1	–		–		–		16	1
VPS	2002	Veikkausliiga	17	0	–		–		–		17	0
VPS	2003	Ykkönen	20	1	–		–		–		20	1
VPS	Total		60	2	0	0	0	0	0	0	60	2
Hämeenlinna	2004	Veikkausliiga	26	2	1	0	–		–		27	2
Örgryte	2005	Allsvenskan	21	1	–		–		–		21	1
Örgryte	2006	Allsvenskan	16	0	–		–		–		16	0
Örgryte	2007	Superettan	21	1	–		–		–		21	1
Örgryte	Total		58	2	0	0	0	0	0	0	58	2
HJK	2008	Veikkausliiga	23	0	2	0	–		0	0	25	0
HJK	2009	Veikkausliiga	20	0	1	0	7	1	2 (Note: Appearances in UEFA Europa League)	0	30	1
HJK	Total		43	0	3	0	7	1	2	0	55	1
Jönköpings Södra IF	2010	Superettan	14	0	1	0	–		–		15	0
Jönköpings Södra IF	2011	Superettan	14	0	1	0	–		–		15	0
Jönköpings Södra IF	Total		28	0	2	0	0	0	0	0	30	0
Career total			215	6	6	0	7	1	2	0	230	7

== Honours ==
HJK

- Veikkausliiga: 2009
- Finnish Cup: 2008
