= Holdrum–Van Houten House =

Historic house in New Jersey, United States

- U.S. National Register of Historic Places
- New Jersey Register of Historic Places
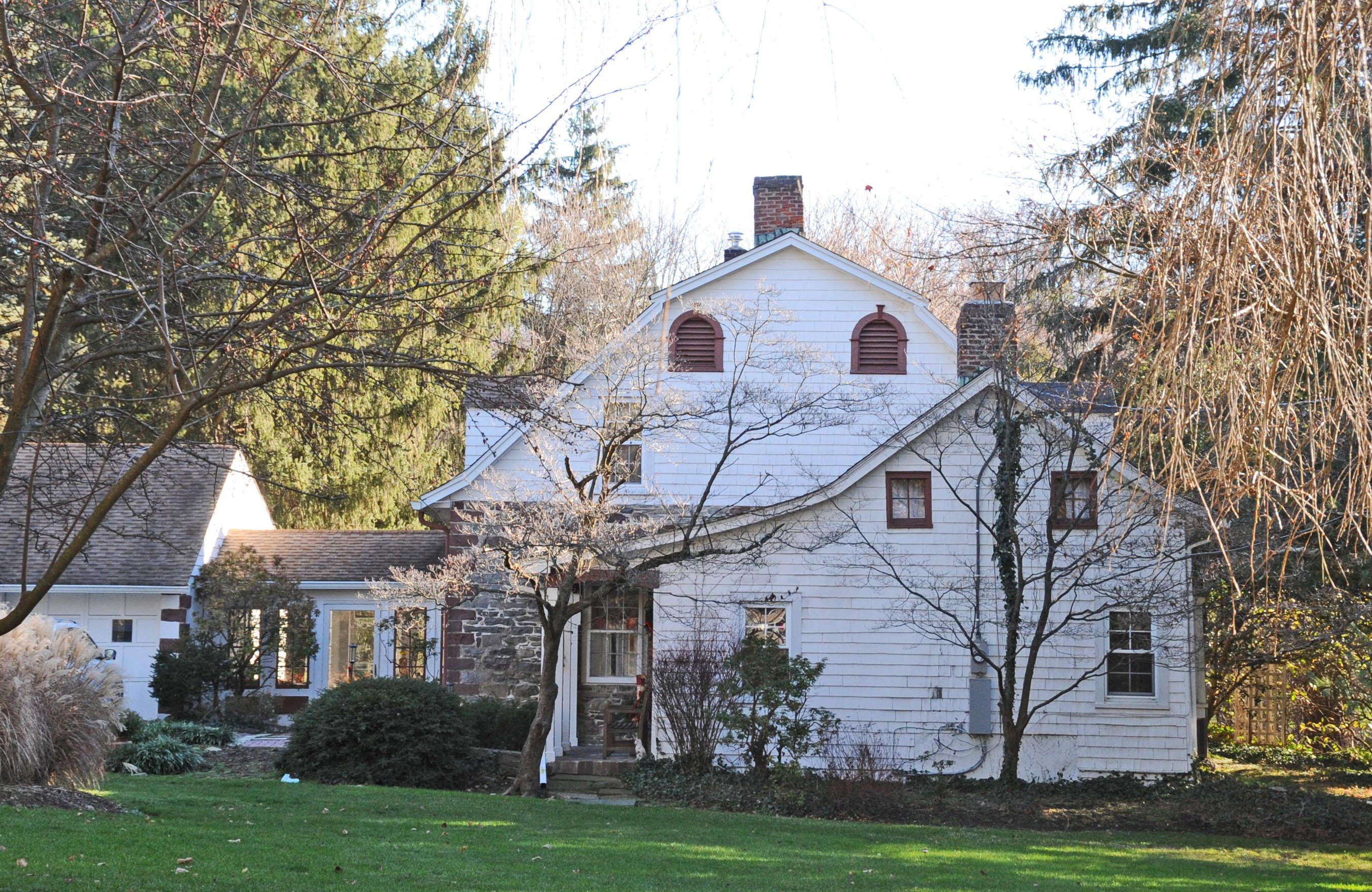

- Location within Bergen County, New Jersey Location within New Jersey Location within the United States
- Location: 43 Spring Valley Road, Montvale, New Jersey
- Coordinates: 41°3′9″N 74°3′5″W
- Area: 2.2 acres (0.89 ha)
- Built: 1778–1780
- MPS: Stone Houses of Bergen County TR
- NRHP reference No.: 83001520
- NJRHP No.: 582

Significant dates
- Added to NRHP: January 9, 1983
- Designated NJRHP: October 3, 1980

The Holdrum–Van Houten House is located at 43 Spring Valley Road in the borough of Montvale in Bergen County, New Jersey, United States. The historic stone house was built from 1778 to around 1780 and was added to the National Register of Historic Places on January 9, 1983, for its significance in architecture. It was listed as part of the Early Stone Houses of Bergen County Multiple Property Submission (MPS).

According to the nomination form, Nicholas Holdrum built the house in 1778 or around 1780 by architectural evidence. It remained in the Holdrum family until 1854, when it was purchased by James Van Houten.

== See also ==
- National Register of Historic Places listings in Bergen County, New Jersey
