= Jacques Crevoisier =

French footballer (1947–2020)

Personal information
- Date of birth: 24 November 1947
- Place of birth: Delle, France
- Date of death: 16 May 2020 (aged 72)
- Place of death: Divonne-les-Bains, France
- Position: Midfielder

Senior career*
Years	Team	Apps	(Gls)
1973–1977	AS Baume-les-Dames		
?–?	Racing Besançon		

Managerial career
- 1973–1977: AS Baume-les-Dames
- 1977–1982: Racing Besançon
- 1996: France U18
- 1997: France U20
- 1999–2000: France U18
- 2001–2003: Liverpool (coach)
- 2005–2011: FC Sochaux-Montbéliard
- * Club domestic league appearances and goals

Jacques Crevoisier (24 November 1947 – 16 May 2020) was a French football player and coach.

== Biography ==
Crevoisier held a doctorate in psychology. A midfielder, he played for AS Baume-les-Dames in Championnat National from 1973 to 1977, winning a Coupe de Franche-Comté in 1974. After his playing career, Crevoisier was a coordinator for FC Sochaux-Montbéliard, a coach for Liverpool F.C. from 2001 to 2003, and a sports consultant for Canal+, where he was also a commentator for Premier League matches. He worked radio broadcasts for RMC and contributed to the So Foot website. He was also an advisor to FIFA and UEFA.

Jacques Crevoisier died on 16 May 2020 in Divonne-les-Bains at the age of 72 due to a heart attack.

== Honours ==
Liverpool

- League Cup: 2003

== Publications ==
- Entraîneur : compétence et passion (2000)
- Mémo urgences (2003)
