= Tim Konings =

Dutch footballer

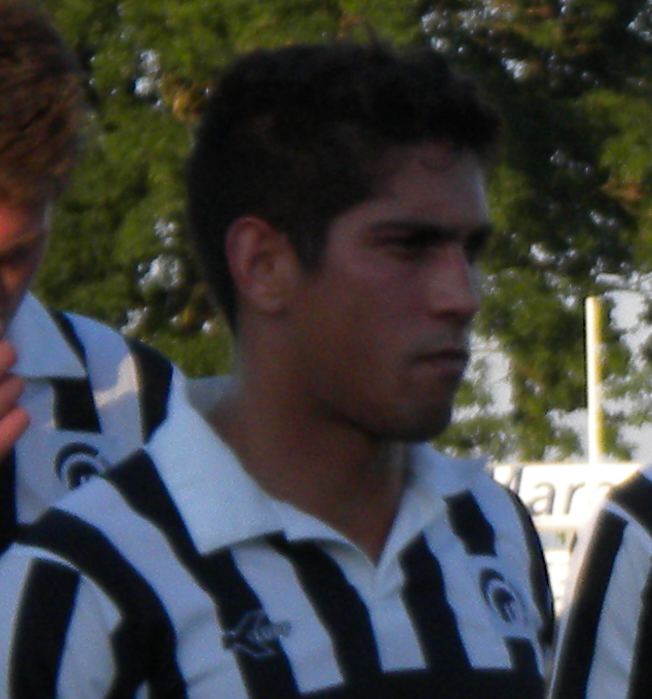

Personal information
- Full name: Tim Konings
- Date of birth: 17 October 1985 (age 41)
- Place of birth: Eindhoven, Netherlands
- Height: 1.75 m (5 ft 9 in)
- Position: Left back

Youth career
- RKVVO
- PSV
- Helmond Sport

Senior career*
Years	Team	Apps	(Gls)
–2008	SV Deurne		
2008–2010	VV De Bataven		
2010–2015	Achilles '29	107	(1)
- * Club domestic league appearances and goals as of 13 May 2015 (UTC)

Tim Konings (born 17 October 1985 in Eindhoven) is a footballer who plays as a left back in the Eerste Divisie for Achilles '29. He formerly played first team football for SV Deurne and VV De Bataven. Konings is a PSV Eindhoven youth product.
