= Jérémy Sopalski =

French footballer (born 1981)

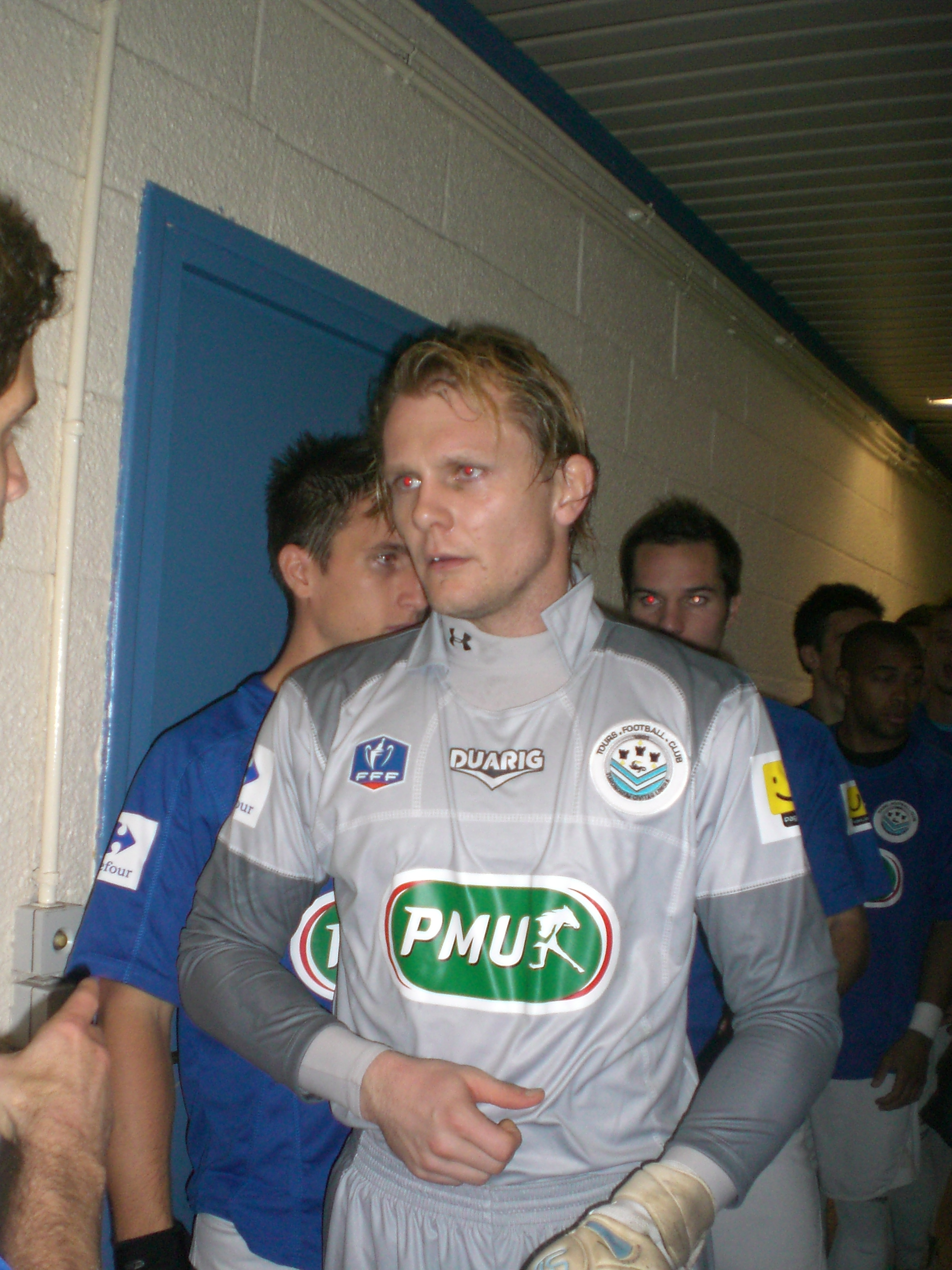

Personal information
- Full name: Jérémy Joseph Stanislas Sopalski
- Date of birth: 6 February 1981 (age 45)
- Place of birth: Somain, France
- Height: 1.87 m (6 ft 2 in)
- Position: Goalkeeper

Youth career
- 2000–2002: AJ Auxerre

Senior career*
Years	Team	Apps	(Gls)
2002–2003	FC Istres	4	(0)
2003–2004	FC Rouen	15	(0)
2004–2005	Associação Naval 1º de Maio		
2006–2009	Rodez AF		
2009–2012	Tours FC	35	(0)

International career
2000	France U-20	1	(0)
- * Club domestic league appearances and goals as of 14 July 2008

Jérémy Sopalski (born 6 February 1981) is a French football player of Polish descent.

== Career ==
- 2000–2002 : AJ Auxerre
- 2002–2003 : FC Istres
- 2003–2004 : FC Rouen
- 2004–2006 : Associação Naval 1º de Maio
- 2006–2009 : Rodez AF
- 2009–2012 : Tours FC

== Statistics ==
- 18 matches in Ligue 2
- 23 matches in Championnat National
- 77 matches in CFA
- 4 matches in Liga de Honra
