= Patrik Křap =

Czech footballer (born 1981)

Personal information
- Date of birth: 13 March 1981 (age 45)
- Place of birth: Czech Republic
- Height: 1.85 m (6 ft 1 in)
- Position: Defender

Team information
- Current team: FK Střelice

Youth career
- FC Brno

Senior career*
| Years | Team | Apps | (Gls) |
| 2000–2004 | FC Brno | 46 | (2) |
| 2004–2005 | Hradec Králové | | |
| 2006–2008 | Union Perg | 52 | (1) |
| 2009–2010 | SK Líšeň | | |
| 2011 | SV Gaflenz | 14 | (2) |
| 2011 | SC Enzersfeld | 13 | (0) |
| 2012–2013 | FC Rohrendorf | 37 | (0) |
| 2013 | SV Waidhofen/Thaya | 12 | (0) |
| 2014 | SV Droß | 14 | (0) |
| 2014–2018 | SV Furth | 97 | (12) |
| 2018–2019 | USV Nappersdorf | 27 | (0) |
| 2019 | Moravská Slavia Brno | | |
| 2020 | St. Veit/Gölsen | 8 | (0) |
| 2021 | Bad Großpertholz | 0 | (0) |
| 2021 | Burgschleinitz | 10 | (1) |
| 2022 | SC Neumüller | 12 | (0) |
| 2022–2023 | USV Kleinhadersdorf | 35 | (1) |
| 2024– | FK Střelice | | |

International career
| 1998–1999 | Czech Republic U17 | 12 | (0) |
| 1999–2000 | Czech Republic U18 | 15 | (0) |
| 2001 | Czech Republic U20 | 5 | (0) |
| 2003 | Czech Republic U21 | 2 | (0) |
- * Club domestic league appearances and goals

Patrik Křap (born 13 March 1981) is a Czech footballer, who currently plays for FK Střelice as a defender.

== Career ==
Křap began playing football for the youth side of 1. FC Brno. He joined the senior side in the summer of 2000, and would make 46 league appearances for the club over four seasons. In the 2005 winter break, he left for FC Hradec Králové, but returned to play for Brno's B side after just six months. In January 2006, Křap moved to Austria to play for Union Perg.

He has represented his country at youth levels.
