= Ilpo Verno =

Finnish footballer (born 1981)

Personal information
- Date of birth: 22 December 1981 (age 44)
- Place of birth: Helsinki, Finland
- Height: 1.72 m (5 ft 8 in)
- Position: Midfielder

Senior career*
Years	Team	Apps	(Gls)
2003	AC Allianssi		
2004	FF Jaro		
2005–2007	FC Honka		
2008	FC Viikingit		
2010–2011	FC Hämeenlinna		
- * Club domestic league appearances and goals

Ilpo Verno (born 22 December 1981) is a Finnish former professional footballer who played as a midfielder.

== Personal life ==
In September 2005 Verno was hospitalised after losing consciousness.
