= Digital DOES =

Dutch footballer

Joos van Barneveld
- Born: 18 January 1982 (age 44); Veghel, Netherlands
- Occupations: Footballer; Graffiti artist
- Height: 1.79 m (5 ft 10 in)
- Spouse: Sanne van Barneveld-Mekel (m. 2009)
- Children: 2
Association football career
- Position: Midfielder
Youth career
- Quick '08
- Fortuna Sittard
Senior career*
Years	Team	Apps	(Gls)
2000–2007	Fortuna Sittard	146	(17)
2007–2009	Eindhoven	7	(1)
- * Club domestic league appearances and goals
- Website: www.digitaldoes.com

Joos van Barneveld (born 18 January 1982), known professionally as DOES or Digital DOES, is a Dutch graffiti artist, and former professional footballer.

== Early life and football career ==
From the age of 9, Van Barneveld trained and played as a professional player for the Dutch club Fortuna Sittard. A promising talent he was selected for the Dutch national youth team under 14 and played his first game in the Dutch Eredivisie in 1999 at the age of 17. The club relegated in 2002 and after having suffered a severe knee injury Van Barneveld continued to play for Fortuna in the second-tier Eerste Divisie. Van Barneveld parted with the club in 2007 after a contractual conflict. The final two years of his football career he played for FC Eindhoven before retiring in 2010 after another knee injury. From 2012 to 2015 Van Barneveld was a part-time talent scout for Aston Villa's academy.

== Career statistics ==
Appearances and goals by season, club and competition
Season	Club	League	Apps	Goals
1999/00	Fortuna Sittard	Eredivisie	5	0
2000/01	Fortuna Sittard	Eredivisie	26	1
2001/02	Fortuna Sittard	Eredivisie	1	0
2002/03	Fortuna Sittard	Eerste Divisie	22	5
2003/04	Fortuna Sittard	Eerste Divisie	30	9
2004/05	Fortuna Sittard	Eerste Divisie	25	1
2005/06	Fortuna Sittard	Eerste Divisie	31	1
2006/07	Fortuna Sittard	Eerste Divisie	6	0
2007/08	FC Eindhoven	Eerste Divisie	7	1
2008/09	FC Eindhoven	Eerste Divisie	0	0
Total			153	18

== Multidisciplinary artist ==
In 1997, at the age of 15, van Barneveld discovered graffiti as a way to escape the constraints and rules of life as a football player. For more than a decade DOES was a professional athlete while secretly creating graffiti at night. After quitting his professional soccer career in 2010, he exclusively devoted himself to art under pseudonym DOES.

For over a decade, DOES travelled to many parts of the world to participate in numerous international projects. Having his roots in Graffiti, DOES is inspired by traditional letterform. The letters D, O, E and S remain the basis of his work. DOES explores different art forms and using various media.

"Letterform is clearly his true love. His dedication to innovation and enviable skill causes him to use letters in ways that most of us would never have envisioned. No matter the medium, his dynamic exploration of colour and shape produces explosively expressive pieces." Lara Chan-Baker: CARBON 2013 interview: Does. In: Acclaim Magazine.

DOES has expressed his goal in life as leaving something tangible behind. DOES has also created three-dimensional works, presenting his first sculpture collection BRIQUE in 2018.

DOES is co-founder of the creative collective LoveLetters crew, a collective of ten European writers founded in 2006.

In April 2017 DOES published his first book 'Qui Facit, Creat’: "he who does, creates". The book intends to showcase the evolution of DOES’ style up until 2016. Later that year, in October he published a second book ‘First 20 Years’ to celebrate a 20-year evolution of dedication to style.

In 2019 DOES designed an anniversary shirt for the professional soccer club Fortuna Sittard celebrating its 50th anniversary.

DOES' third book 'Endless Perspectives' was released in 2020 documenting the Endless Perspectives project, aiming to capture graffiti's transient nature.

== Selected exhibition ==
DOES took part in a multitude of museum and gallery exhibitions.

- 2020: Duo show Aesthetics, ArtCan Gallery Paris, France.
- 2019: Group exhibition ‘Dutch Finest Artists’ Pop-up exhibition at Art Basel Miami, Sober Collective Art Gallery, Miami.
- 2019: Urban Art Fair, Artcan Gallery, Paris, France.
- 2019: Contemporary Art Fair, Malagacha Gallery, Paris, France.
- 2018: Group exhibition Inside Outside, Het Stadsmus Hasselt, Belgium.
- 2018: Group exhibition This is now, wyn317 Gallery Miami, USA.
- 2018: Duo show Left Handed, 44309 Gallery Dortmund, Germany.
- 2017: Group show Connecting Lines, The Black & White Building, London, UK.
- 2016: Group show Convergence, Wyn317 Gallery Miami, USA.
- 2016: Duo show Authenticus, Dampkring Gallery, Amsterdam, the Netherlands.
- 2016: Group exhibition Surface, Vroom & Varossieau Gallery, Amsterdam, the Netherlands.
- 2015: Solo Exhibition Transition, Maxwell Colette Gallery, Chicago, USA.
- 2015: Annual group show (coll.), Dampkring Gallery, Amsterdam, the Netherlands.
- 2015: Art 17 (Coll.), Dampkring Gallery, Amsterdam, the Netherlands.
- 2015: A major Minority (coll.), 1AM Gallery, San Francisco, USA.
- 2014: Hypergraffiti: the visual language (coll.), Mural museum, Heerlen, the Netherlands.
- 2014: A major Minority (coll.), 1AM Gallery, San Francisco, USA.
- 2013: Solo exhibition Endless Perspectives, End to End building, Melbourne, Australia.
- 2013: Solo exhibition Endless Perspectives, The Tate, Sydney, Australia
- 2012: Art Melbourne (coll.), Royal Exhibition Building, Melbourne, Australia

== Film ==
- Reporter Frank Heinen from The Dutch Broadcast Foundation NOS recapitulates DOES' soccer career and his transition to becoming a graffiti artist in 62 jaar betaald voetbal: Joos van Barneveld.

== Bibliography ==
- Maxime Delcourt: Broken Lines, Graffiti Art Magazine, issue 44, 2019.
- Kiriakos Iosifidis: Mural Master - a new generation, Gingko press, ISBN 9781584237297, 2019.
- Le Petit Voyeur 6, Published by Le Petit Voyeur, 2018.
- Robert Whitelock and Aaron Munday: Monokrome, Monokrome Publishing, ISBN 9780956936028, November 2016
- Søren Solkær: Surface, Ginko Press, ISBN 9781584235798, 2015.
- Frank Malt: 100 European Graffiti Artists, Schiffer Publishing, ISBN 9780764346583, June 2014.
- Anna Wadaweck: Graffiti and Street Art, Published by Thames & Hudson, ISBN 9780500204078, 2011.
- Claudia Walde: Street Fonts, Published by Thames & Hudson Ltd, ISBN 9780500515594, Februari 2011.
- Björn Almqvist: Graffiti Burners, Published by Dokument Forlag, ISBN 9789185639427, April 2011.
