= Roald van Hout =

Dutch footballer

Personal information
- Full name: Roald van Hout
- Date of birth: 23 April 1988 (age 38)
- Place of birth: Waddinxveen, Netherlands
- Height: 1.80 m (5 ft 11 in)
- Position: Winger

Youth career
- –2007: UDI '19
- 2007–2008: RKC

Senior career*
Years	Team	Apps	(Gls)
2008–2012	RKC	53	(4)
2012–2014	Sparta	33	(7)
2014–2016	Eindhoven	57	(10)
2016–2017	Fortuna Sittard	27	(7)
2017–2023	UDI '19		
Total		170	(28)
- * Club domestic league appearances and goals as of 12 April 2022

Roald van Hout (born 23 April 1988) is a Dutch retired footballer who last played as a winger for hometown club UDI '19.

Born in Waddinxveen and raised in Uden, he played profesionally for RKC Waalwijk, Sparta Rotterdam, FC Eindhoven and Fortuna Sittard.

He retired in 2023.
