= Mika Niskala =

Finnish footballer (born 1981)

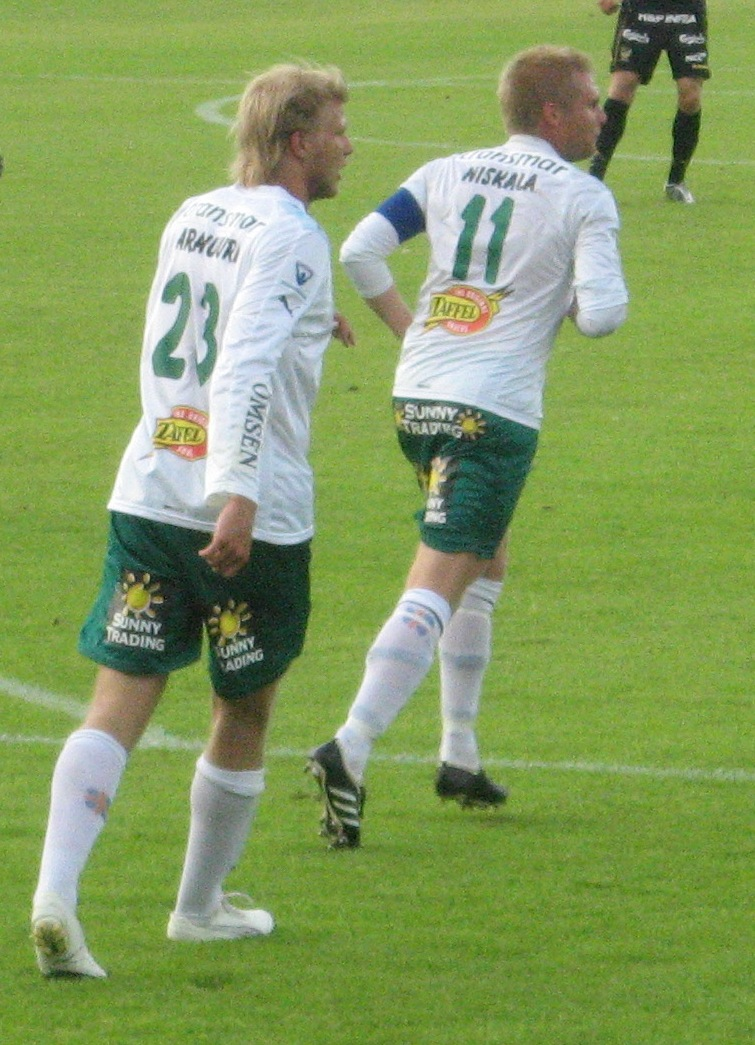

Personal information
- Date of birth: 28 March 1981 (age 45)
- Place of birth: Mariehamn, Finland
- Height: 1.79 m (5 ft 10 1/2 in)
- Position: Midfielder

Team information
- Current team: IFK Mariehamn
- Number: 12

Senior career*
Years	Team	Apps	(Gls)
2001	IFK Norrköping	2	(0)
2002–2004	Inter Turku	59	(5)
2005–2010	IFK Mariehamn	128	(9)
2011	Alta IF	22	(0)
2012	IFK Mariehamn	25	(0)

International career
2001	Finland U20	5	(0)
- Åland
- * Club domestic league appearances and goals as of 30 March 2011

Mika Niskala (born 28 March 1981) is a Finnish former footballer. Niskala served as captain in the Veikkausliiga for IFK Mariehamn, and has also represented FC Inter Turku and Swedish IFK Norrköping.

== Personal life ==
His father Kari Niskala is a former professional footballer.

== Career statistics ==
As of 23 October 2024.

Appearances and goals by club, season and competition
Club	Season	League			Cup (Note: Includes Suomen Cup, Finnish League Cup and Norwegian Cup)		Total	
Club	Season	Division	Apps	Goals	Apps	Goals	Apps	Goals
IFK Mariehamn	1997	Kakkonen	9	0	0	0	9	0
IFK Norrköping	2001	Allsvenskan	2	0	0	0	2	0
Inter Turku	2002	Veikkausliiga	22	2	0	0	22	2
Inter Turku	2003	Veikkausliiga	26	2	0	0	26	2
Inter Turku	2004	Veikkausliiga	11	1	0	0	11	1
Inter Turku	Total		59	5	0	0	59	5
VG-62 (loan)	2004	Ykkönen	6	1	0	0	6	1
IFK Mariehamn	2005	Veikkausliiga	14	1	0	0	14	1
IFK Mariehamn	2006	Veikkausliiga	23	3	0	0	23	3
IFK Mariehamn	2007	Veikkausliiga	22	2	0	0	22	2
IFK Mariehamn	2008	Veikkausliiga	22	2	0	0	22	2
IFK Mariehamn	2009	Veikkausliiga	23	1	8	1	31	2
IFK Mariehamn	2010	Veikkausliiga	24	0	3	0	27	0
IFK Mariehamn	Total		128	9	11	1	139	10
Alta IF	2011	1. divisjon	22	0	2	0	24	0
IFK Mariehamn	2012	Veikkausliiga	25	0	5	0	30	0
Career total			249	15	18	1	267	16
