= Elmwood Park, New Jersey =

Borough in Bergen County, New Jersey, US

- Borough
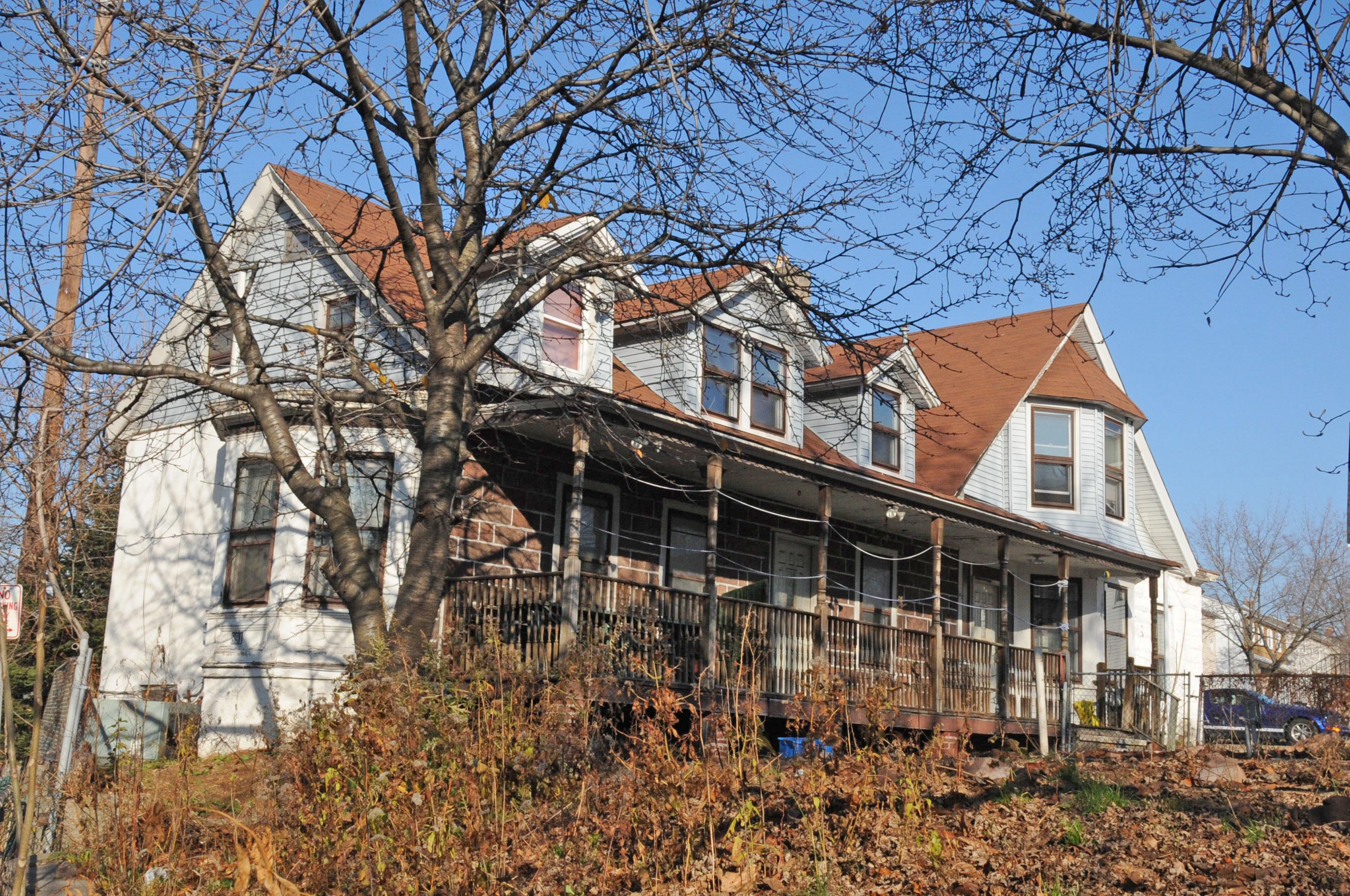
- Van Houten–Hillman House, listed on the National Register of Historic Places

- Seal

- Location of Elmwood Park in Bergen County highlighted in red (left). Inset map: Location of Bergen County in New Jersey highlighted in orange (right).

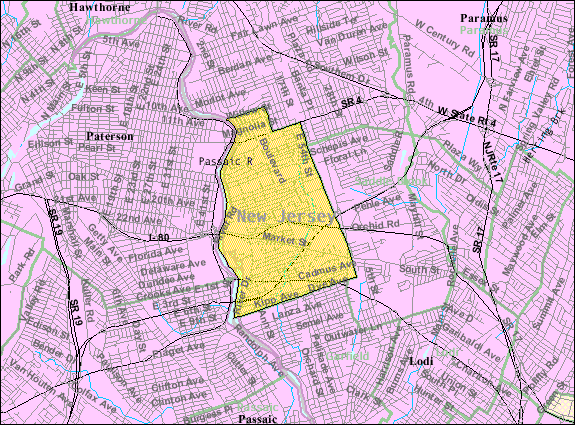
- Census Bureau map of Elmwood Park, New Jersey

- Location in Bergen County Location in New Jersey Location in the United States
- Coordinates: 40.904526°N 74.119514°W
- Country: United States
- State: New Jersey
- County: Bergen
- Incorporated: April 18, 1916 (as East Paterson)
- Renamed: January 1, 1973 (to Elmwood Park)

Government
  - Type: Borough
  - Body: Borough Council
  - Mayor: Robert Colletti (R, term ends December 31, 2027)
  - Administrator: Michael Foligno
  - Municipal clerk: Shanee Morris

Area
  - Total: 2.73 sq mi (7.06 km^{2})
  - Land: 2.64 sq mi (6.85 km^{2})
  - Water: 0.081 sq mi (0.21 km^{2}) 3.00%
  - Rank: 362nd of 565 in state 34th of 70 in county
- Elevation: 46 ft (14 m)

Population (2020)
  - Total: 21,422
  - Estimate (2023): 21,256
  - Rank: 130th of 565 in state 14th of 70 in county
  - Density: 8,105.2/sq mi (3,129.4/km^{2})
  - Rank: 49th of 565 in state 14th of 70 in county
- Time zone: UTC−05:00 (Eastern (EST))
  - Summer (DST): UTC−04:00 (Eastern (EDT))
- ZIP Code: 07407
- Area code: 201
- FIPS code: 3400321300
- GNIS feature ID: 0885207
- Website: www.elmwoodparknj.us

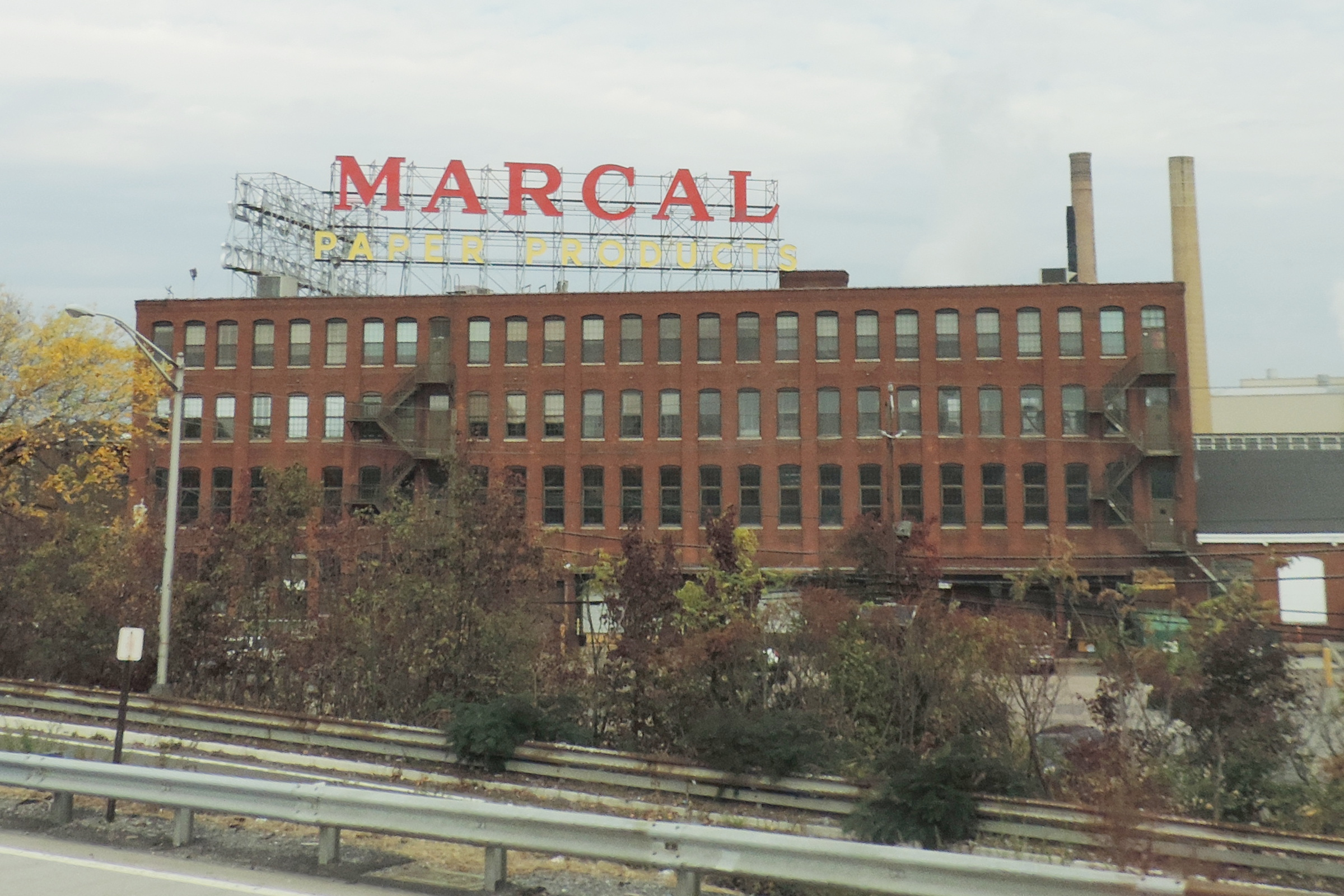
Marcal paper factory in Elmwood Park in 2014, destroyed by fire in 2019

Elmwood Park is a borough in Bergen County, in the U.S. state of New Jersey, and is a bedroom suburb located 14 miles (23 km) from New York City. As of the 2020 United States census, the borough's population was 21,422, an increase of 2,019 (+10.4%) from the 2010 census count of 19,403, which in turn reflected an increase of 478 (+2.5%) from the 18,925 counted in the 2000 census.

Prior to 1916, the area was known as Dundee Lake, a section of Saddle River Township. Residents of the Dundee Lake area voted on April 18, 1916, to secede from Saddle River Township to form the Borough of East Paterson.} In 1917, residents of the Rosemont section of Saddle River Township voted to be annexed to East Paterson. In November 1972, residents voted to change the name of the borough to Elmwood Park. The new name became official on January 1, 1973.

Elmwood Park, being located in Bergen County, has strict blue laws, which require most businesses to be closed on Sunday.

== Geography ==
According to the United States Census Bureau, the borough had a total area of 2.73 square miles (7.06 km^{2}), including 2.64 square miles (6.85 km^{2}) of land and 0.08 square miles (0.21 km^{2}) of water (3.00%).

The borough borders Paterson and Clifton in Passaic County across the Passaic River to the West; Fair Lawn to the North and East; Saddle Brook to the East; and Garfield to the South (the latter three municipalities in Bergen County). A trip clockwise along the border from the Northwest corner runs from the middle of the Passaic River ENE along Willow Street, SSE along Cyril Avenue, ENE along New Jersey Route 4 (Broadway), SSE along the Bergen County Line, WSW along the extension of Rosario Court from Saddle Brook, continuing WSW along Dye Ave. and between Garwood Court North and Kipp Avenue, and N along the middle of the Passaic River.

Unincorporated communities, localities and place names within the borough include Cherry Hill, Dundee Lake, Passaic Junction and Rosemont.

== Demographics ==
Historical population
Census	Pop.	Note	%±
1900	892		—
1910	1,396		56.5%
1920	2,441		74.9%
1930	4,779		95.8%
1940	4,937		3.3%
1950	15,386		211.6%
1960	19,344		25.7%
1970	20,511		6.0%
1980	18,377		−10.4%
1990	17,623		−4.1%
2000	18,925		7.4%
2010	19,403		2.5%
2020	21,422		10.4%
2023 (est.)	21,256	▼	−0.8%
Population sources: 1920; 1920–1930 1900–2020; 2000 2010 2020

=== Racial and ethnic composition ===
Elmwood Park borough, Bergen County, New Jersey – Racial and ethnic composition Note: the US Census treats Hispanic/Latino as an ethnic category. This table excludes Latinos from the racial categories and assigns them to a separate category. Hispanics/Latinos may be of any race.
Race / Ethnicity (NH = Non-Hispanic)	Pop 2000	Pop 2010	Pop 2020	% 2000	% 2010	% 2020
White alone (NH)	14,138	11,957	10,928	74.71%	61.62%	51.01%
Black or African American alone (NH)	379	884	1,494	2.00%	4.56%	6.97%
Native American or Alaska Native alone (NH)	19	19	25	0.10%	0.10%	0.12%
Asian alone (NH)	1,474	2,055	2,367	7.79%	10.59%	11.05%
Native Hawaiian or Pacific Islander alone (NH)	1	3	0	0.01%	0.02%	0.00%
Other race alone (NH)	21	69	238	0.11%	0.36%	1.11%
Mixed race or Multiracial (NH)	358	299	472	1.89%	1.54%	2.20%
Hispanic or Latino (any race)	2,535	4,117	5,898	13.39%	21.22%	27.53%
Total	18,925	19,403	21,422	100.00%	100.00%	100.00%

=== 2020 census ===
As of the 2020 census, Elmwood Park had a population of 21,422. The median age was 40.9 years, with 19.7% of residents under the age of 18 and 16.8% who were 65 years of age or older. For every 100 females there were 91.0 males, and for every 100 females age 18 and over there were 87.5 males age 18 and over.

100.0% of residents lived in urban areas, while 0.0% lived in rural areas.

There were 7,652 households in Elmwood Park, of which 32.4% had children under the age of 18 living in them. Of all households, 49.9% were married-couple households, 15.6% were households with a male householder and no spouse or partner present, and 28.7% were households with a female householder and no spouse or partner present. About 21.5% of all households were made up of individuals and 10.0% had someone living alone who was 65 years of age or older.

There were 7,949 housing units, of which 3.7% were vacant. The homeowner vacancy rate was 0.9% and the rental vacancy rate was 2.9%.

=== 2010 census ===
The 2010 United States census counted 19,403 people, 7,032 households, and 5,140 families in the borough. The population density was 7,327.9 per square mile (2,829.3/km^{2}). There were 7,385 housing units at an average density of 2,789.1 per square mile (1,076.9/km^{2}). The racial makeup was 75.37% (14,624) White, 5.25% (1,019) Black or African American, 0.33% (65) Native American, 10.72% (2,080) Asian, 0.02% (4) Pacific Islander, 5.47% (1,062) from other races, and 2.83% (549) from two or more races. Hispanic or Latino of any race were 21.22% (4,117) of the population.

Of the 7,032 households, 31.1% had children under the age of 18; 53.8% were married couples living together; 14.2% had a female householder with no husband present and 26.9% were non-families. Of all households, 22.3% were made up of individuals and 10.3% had someone living alone who was 65 years of age or older. The average household size was 2.76 and the average family size was 3.25.

20.8% of the population were under the age of 18, 8.5% from 18 to 24, 28.7% from 25 to 44, 27.3% from 45 to 64, and 14.7% who were 65 years of age or older. The median age was 39.5 years. For every 100 females, the population had 91.5 males. For every 100 females ages 18 and older there were 88.9 males.

The Census Bureau's 2006–2010 American Community Survey showed that (in 2010 inflation-adjusted dollars) median household income was $66,719 (with a margin of error of +/− $8,506) and the median family income was $75,587 (+/− $4,326). Males had a median income of $50,943 (+/− $1,704) versus $41,654 (+/− $3,193) for females. The per capita income for the borough was $29,959 (+/− $2,217). About 3.7% of families and 4.5% of the population were below the poverty line, including 3.7% of those under age 18 and 8.2% of those age 65 or over.

Same-sex couples headed 49 households in 2010, an increase from the 33 counted in 2000.

=== 2000 census ===
As of the 2000 United States census there were 18,925 people, 7,089 households, and 5,075 families residing in the borough. The population density was 7,129.8 inhabitants per square mile (2,752.8/km^{2}). There were 7,242 housing units at an average density of 2,728.3 per square mile (1,053.4/km^{2}). The racial makeup of the borough was 78.53% White, 4.16% African American, 0.11% Native American, 7.80% Asian, 0.01% Pacific Islander, 4.44% from other races, and 2.94% from two or more races. Hispanic or Latino of any race were 15.39% of the population.

There were 7,089 households, out of which 29.5% had children under the age of 18 living with them, 55.4% were married couples living together, 11.8% had a female householder with no husband present, and 28.4% were non-families. 23.2% of all households were made up of individuals, and 12.3% had someone living alone who was 65 years of age or older. The average household size was 2.66 and the average family size was 3.17.

In the borough the population was spread out, with 20.9% under the age of 18, 8.0% from 18 to 24, 31.4% from 25 to 44, 23.3% from 45 to 64, and 16.5% who were 65 years of age or older. The median age was 38 years. For every 100 females, there were 91.5 males. For every 100 females age 18 and over, there were 88.6 males.

The median income for a household in the borough was $52,319, and the median income for a family was $59,131. Males had a median income of $40,684 versus $39,535 for females. The per capita income for the borough was $28,588. About 4.7% of families and 2.4% of the population were below the poverty line, including 4.7% of those under age 18 and 5.3% of those age 65 or over.

== Arts and culture ==
Musical groups from the borough include the hardcore punk band Adrenalin O.D.

== Government ==
=== Local government ===
Elmwood Park is governed under the borough form of New Jersey municipal government, which is used in 218 municipalities (of the 564) statewide, making it the most common form of government in New Jersey. The governing body is comprised of a mayor and a borough council, with all positions elected at-large on a partisan basis as part of the November general election. A mayor is elected directly by the voters to a four-year term of office. The borough council includes six members elected to serve three-year terms on a staggered basis, with two seats coming up for election each year in a three-year cycle. The borough form of government is a "weak mayor / strong council" government in which council members act as the legislative body with the mayor presiding at meetings and voting only in the event of a tie. The mayor can veto ordinances subject to an override by a two-thirds majority vote of the council. The mayor makes committee and liaison assignments for council members, and most appointments are made by the mayor with the advice and consent of the council.

As of 2024, the mayor of Elmwood Park is Republican Robert Colletti, whose term of office expires December 31, 2027. Members of the borough council are Council President Theresa Sheridan (R, 2024), Tanisha Dennis (D, 2024), Francesco Fasolo (D, 2025), Daniel Golabek (D, 2025), Lorraine Pellegrine (R, 2026) and Pamela Troisi (R, 2026).

After being denied support by the Democratic Party in her re-election bid, Lorraine Pellegrine announced in March 2023 that she would switch parties and run as a Republican in the November general election.

Republican Richard A. Mola served continuously as mayor for nearly 45 years, from 1972 (a year before the borough's name was changed from East Paterson) until his death in 2016. He was replaced by Robert Colletti on an interim basis. In May 2019, Daniel Golabek was selected from three candidates nominated by the Democratic municipal committee to take the mayoral seat after Frank Caramanga resigned in the wake of accusations that he had completed voter ballots. In June 2019, Francesco Fasolo was appointed to fill the seat expiring in December 2019 that became vacant when Daniel Golabek took office as mayor in April.

=== Federal, state and county representation ===
Elmwood Park is located in the 9th Congressional District and is part of New Jersey's 35th state legislative district.

For the 119th United States Congress, New Jersey's 9th congressional district is represented by Nellie Pou (D, North Haledon) New Jersey is represented in the United States Senate by Democrats Cory Booker (Newark, term ends 2027) and Andy Kim (Moorestown, term ends 2031).

For the 2026–2027 session, the 35th legislative district of the New Jersey Legislature is represented in the State Senate by Benjie Wimberly (D, Paterson) and in the General Assembly by Al Abdelaziz (D, Paterson) and Kenyatta Stewart (D, Paterson).

Bergen County is governed by a directly elected County Executive, with legislative functions performed by a Board of County Commissioners comprised of seven members who are elected at-large to three-year terms in partisan elections on a staggered basis, with either two or three seats coming up for election each November; a Chairman and Vice Chairman are selected from among its seven members at a reorganization meeting held every January. As of 2025, the county executive is James J. Tedesco III (D, Paramus), whose four-year term of office ends December 31, 2026.

Bergen County's Commissioners are Chair Mary J. Amoroso (D, Mahwah, 2025), Vice Chair Steven A. Tanelli (D, North Arlington, 2027), Chair Pro Tem Joan Voss (D, Fort Lee, 2026), Rafael Marte (D, Bergenfield, 2026), Germaine M. Ortiz (D, Emerson, 2025), Thomas J. Sullivan Jr. (D, Montvale, 2025) and Tracy Silna Zur (D, Franklin Lakes, 2027).

Bergen County's elected constitutional officials are Clerk John S. Hogan (D, Northvale, 2026), Sheriff Anthony Cureton (D, Englewood, 2027) and Surrogate Michael R. Dressler (D, Cresskill, 2026).

=== Politics ===
As of March 2011, there were a total of 10,470 registered voters in Elmwood Park, of which 3,256 (31.1% vs. 31.7% countywide) were registered as Democrats, 1,898 (18.1% vs. 21.1%) were registered as Republicans and 5,312 (50.7% vs. 47.1%) were registered as Unaffiliated. There were 4 voters registered as Libertarians or Greens. Among the borough's 2010 Census population, 54.0% (vs. 57.1% in Bergen County) were registered to vote, including 68.2% of those ages 18 and over (vs. 73.7% countywide).

Gubernatorial election results for Elmwood Park
Year	Republican		Democratic		Third party(ies)	
Year	No.	%	No.	%	No.	%
2025	2,790	44.92%	3,385	54.50%	36	0.58%
2021	2,498	51.61%	2,325	48.04%	17	0.35%
2017	1,579	41.31%	2,163	56.59%	80	2.09%
2013	2,498	58.78%	1,695	39.88%	57	1.34%
2009	2,099	44.78%	2,297	49.01%	291	6.21%
2005	1,847	38.09%	2,830	58.36%	172	3.55%

In the 2016 presidential election, Democrat Hillary Clinton received 4,559 votes (53.3% vs. 54.2% countywide), ahead of Republican Donald Trump with 3,737 votes (43.7% vs. 41.1%) and other candidates with 261 votes (3.1% vs. 4.6%), among the 8,690 ballots cast by the borough's 12,582 registered voters, for a turnout of 69.1% (vs. 72.5% in Bergen County). In the 2012 presidential election, Democrat Barack Obama received 4,506 votes (60.6% vs. 54.8% countywide), ahead of Republican Mitt Romney with 2,790 votes (37.5% vs. 43.5%) and other candidates with 59 votes (0.8% vs. 0.9%), among the 7,434 ballots cast by the borough's 11,262 registered voters, for a turnout of 66.0% (vs. 70.4% in Bergen County). In the 2008 presidential election, Democrat Barack Obama received 4,462 votes (55.0% vs. 53.9% countywide), ahead of Republican John McCain with 3,459 votes (42.7% vs. 44.5%) and other candidates with 93 votes (1.1% vs. 0.8%), among the 8,109 ballots cast by the borough's 11,201 registered voters, for a turnout of 72.4% (vs. 76.8% in Bergen County). In the 2004 presidential election, Democrat John Kerry received 4,246 votes (54.3% vs. 51.7% countywide), ahead of Republican George W. Bush with 3,474 votes (44.4% vs. 47.2%) and other candidates with 56 votes (0.7% vs. 0.7%), among the 7,819 ballots cast by the borough's 10,922 registered voters, for a turnout of 71.6% (vs. 76.9% in the whole county).

Presidential elections results
Year	Republican	Democratic
2024	53.3% 4,794	43.2% 3,884
2020	45.6% 4,475	53.4% 5,238
2016	43.7% 3,737	53.3% 4,559
2012	37.5% 2,790	60.6% 4,506
2008	42.7% 3,459	55.0% 4,462
2004	44.4% 3,474	54.3% 4,246

In the 2013 gubernatorial election, Republican Chris Christie received 58.8% of the vote (2,498 cast), ahead of Democrat Barbara Buono with 39.9% (1,695 votes), and other candidates with 1.3% (57 votes), among the 4,383 ballots cast by the borough's 10,906 registered voters (133 ballots were spoiled), for a turnout of 40.2%. In the 2009 gubernatorial election, Democrat Jon Corzine received 2,297 ballots cast (48.4% vs. 48.0% countywide), ahead of Republican Chris Christie with 2,099 votes (44.2% vs. 45.8%), Independent Chris Daggett with 264 votes (5.6% vs. 4.7%) and other candidates with 27 votes (0.6% vs. 0.5%), among the 4,750 ballots cast by the borough's 10,758 registered voters, yielding a 44.2% turnout (vs. 50.0% in the county).

United States Senate election results for Elmwood Park1
Year	Republican		Democratic		Third party(ies)	
Year	No.	%	No.	%	No.	%
2024	4,176	50.28%	3,791	45.65%	338	4.07%
2018	2,282	41.17%	3,084	55.64%	177	3.19%
2012	2,275	35.03%	4,092	63.00%	128	1.97%
2006	1,933	42.57%	2,534	55.80%	74	1.63%

United States Senate election results for Elmwood Park2
Year	Republican		Democratic		Third party(ies)	
Year	No.	%	No.	%	No.	%
2020	3,935	41.70%	5,327	56.45%	175	1.85%
2014	1,507	40.12%	2,177	57.96%	72	1.92%
2013	1,058	46.02%	1,205	52.41%	36	1.57%
2008	2,707	38.26%	4,275	60.42%	94	1.33%

== Education ==
The Elmwood Park Public Schools serve students in pre-kindergarten through twelfth grade. As of the 2020–21 school year, the district, comprised of five schools, had an enrollment of 2,586 students and 195.9 classroom teachers (on an FTE basis), for a student–teacher ratio of 13.2:1. Schools in the district (with 2020–21 enrollment data from the National Center for Education Statistics) are Gantner Avenue Elementary School with 327 students in grades K-5, Gilbert Avenue Elementary School with 392 students in grades K-5, Sixteenth Avenue Elementary School with 427 students in grades PreK-5, Memorial Middle School with 643 students in grades 6-8 and Elmwood Park Memorial High School with 742 students in grades 9-12.

Despite boasting several state championship football teams in the early 1970s, the Elmwood Park High School Crusaders football team went into a lengthy period of decline. The Crusader football team had a 41-game losing streak in effect from 2002 until September 30, 2006, when they defeated the Manchester Regional High School Falcons, 33–14, ending the four-year-long losing streak.

Public school students from the borough, and all of Bergen County, are eligible to attend the secondary education programs offered by the Bergen County Technical Schools, which include the Bergen County Academies in Hackensack, and the Bergen Tech campus in Teterboro or Paramus. The district offers programs on a shared-time or full-time basis, with admission based on a selective application process and tuition covered by the student's home school district.

== Emergency services ==
Elmwood Park has a fire department with four fire stations. Station 1 (E1-R1) on Grove Street. Station 2 (E2-R2-Marine 1 and 2) on Parkview Avenue. Station 3 (E3-Squad 3) on Martha Avenue. And Station 4 (T4) at the intersection of Boulevard and Veterans Place.

Established in the 1960s, Elmwood Park had a volunteer ambulance corps on Falmouth Avenue, which was disbanded in 2019 due to declining numbers of volunteers. Elmwood Park is now served by a paid EMS service.

Elmwood Park has a police department located on Market Street.

== Transportation ==
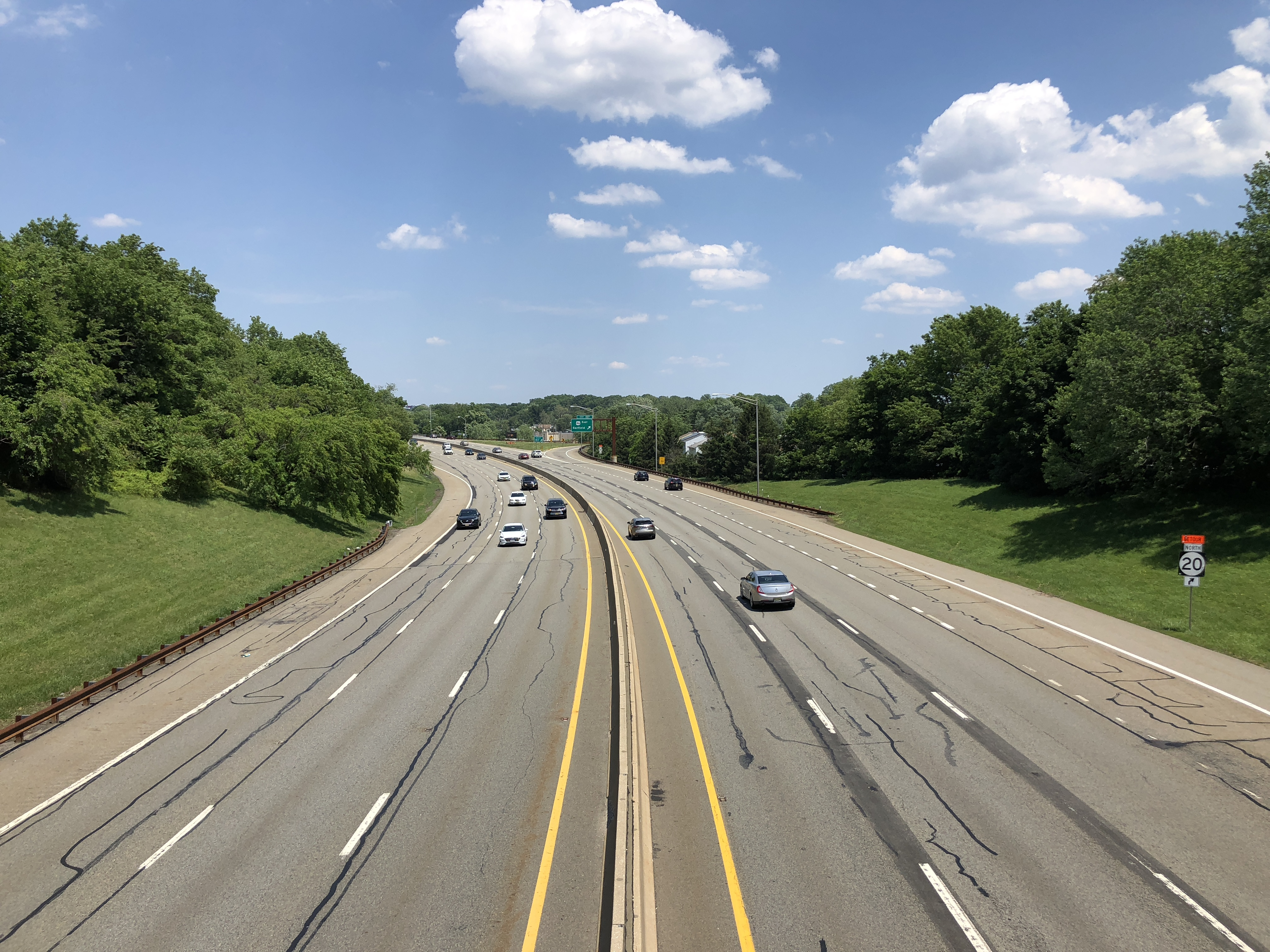
The Garden State Parkway northbound in Elmwood Park

=== Roads and highways ===
As of May 2010, the borough had a total of 52.86 miles (85.07 km) of roadways, of which 41.87 miles (67.38 km) were maintained by the municipality, 5.95 miles (9.58 km) by Bergen County and 3.40 miles (5.47 km) by the New Jersey Department of Transportation and 1.64 miles (2.64 km) by the New Jersey Turnpike Authority.

Route 4, Interstate 80, U.S. Route 46, and the Garden State Parkway serve Elmwood Park.

=== Public transportation ===
Elmwood Park is served by NJ Transit buses 160 and 161 to the Port Authority Bus Terminal in Midtown Manhattan, with local service on the 702, 712, 758 and 770 routes. NJ Transit's Bergen County Line tracks travel through Elmwood Park, but does not have a station stop in the borough, with the nearest stations being the Radburn and Broadway stations in Fair Lawn.

The Passaic-Bergen Rail Line is a proposed rail system that is planned to have a stop in Elmwood Park.

== Points of interest ==
The Van Houten–Hillman House, named for Cornelius J. Van Houten who constructed the house c. 1782 and Herman Hillman who purchased it in 1898, was added to the National Register of Historic Places on January 9, 1983.

The House of Loud, recording studio where numerous metalcore, punk and post-hardcore bands recorded such as Pierce the Veil, Breaking Benjamin, Paramore, Papa Roach and Bring Me the Horizon.

Artesian Fields County Park- a Bergen County-owned park located on Boulevard and Gilbert Street. The park consists of athletic fields, a walking path, a lake beach, a small zoo, and a playground.

Parkway Lanes is a bowling alley located at the intersection of the Garden State Parkway and Route 46 that has been in operation since June 1959.

The Marcal Paper Company Plant was a landmark until its destruction by fire in January 2019. Its parent company, Soundview Paper Company, continues to make Marcal paper products. In January 2020, one year and one day following the devastating fire that destroyed the Mill, Marcal Paper officially restarted paper manufacturing.

== Controversy ==
White supremacist groups had been meeting at a local branch of the Junior Order of United American Mechanics since the 1990s. David Duke stopped there during his 1988 presidential campaign. On September 25, 2007, the locks were changed, reported the secretary treasurer of the JOUAM. At this time, he states, "As soon as we found out, we took action," referring to the revelation that some members of the Junior Order chapter were white power activists. Numerous boxes containing tapes and books were recovered by the police, which were sent to the FBI.

== Notable people ==
People who were born in, residents of, or otherwise closely associated with Elmwood Park include:

- ASAP Rocky (born 1988 as Rakim Mayers), rapper
- Cathy Bao Bean (born 1942), author of The Chopsticks-Fork Principle: A Memoir and Manual
- Cornelius A. Cadmus (1844–1902), represented New Jersey's 5th congressional district from 1891 to 1895
- Carmen Carrera (born 1985), transgender entertainer and model / reality television personality who appeared on RuPaul's Drag Race Season 3
- W. Cary Edwards (1944–2010), politician who served as New Jersey Attorney General from 1986 to 1989
- Sheena Iyengar (born 1969), Columbia Business School professor
- Christian Mahogany (born 2000), American football offensive guard for the Boston College Eagles.
- Cora-Ann Mihalik (born c. 1954), former television news anchor and reporter who was best known as co-anchor and news reporter for Fox WNYW and My 9 WWOR from 1987 to 2011
- Liv Morgan (born 1994), model and WWE wrestler (billed from Elmwood Park, grew up in Morristown, New Jersey).
- John “Jack” McGrath (born 1919), World War II Veteran, part of the 101st Airborne Division E Company, depicted in the Band of Brothers miniseries about the E Company, 506th Infantry Regiment during World War II
- Gary Nova (born 1993), quarterback for the Rutgers Scarlet Knights football team
- Dick Vitale (born 1939), basketball coach and broadcaster
- Robert Zoellner (1932–2014), investor and stamp collector who was the second person to have assembled a complete collection of United States postage stamps

== Sources ==
- Municipal Incorporations of the State of New Jersey (according to Counties) prepared by the Division of Local Government, Department of the Treasury (New Jersey); December 1, 1958.
- Clayton, W. Woodford; and Nelson, Nelson. History of Bergen and Passaic Counties, New Jersey, with Biographical Sketches of Many of its Pioneers and Prominent Men. Philadelphia: Everts and Peck, 1882.
- Harvey, Cornelius Burnham (ed.), Genealogical History of Hudson and Bergen Counties, New Jersey. New York: New Jersey Genealogical Publishing Co., 1900.
- Van Valen, James M. History of Bergen County, New Jersey. New York: New Jersey Publishing and Engraving Co., 1900.
- Westervelt, Frances A. (Frances Augusta), 1858–1942, History of Bergen County, New Jersey, 1630–1923, Lewis Historical Publishing Company, 1923.
