= Marcel Akerboom =

Dutch footballer (born 1981)

Personal information
- Full name: Marcel Akerboom
- Date of birth: 28 October 1981 (age 45)
- Place of birth: Leiden, Netherlands
- Height: 1.90 m (6 ft 3 in)
- Position: Defender

Youth career
- 1993-1994: Noordwijk
- 1994-2000: AjaxU19

Senior career*
Years	Team	Apps	(Gls)
2000–2006	Fortuna Sittard	55	(1)
2006–2007	FC Zwolle	3	(0)
2007–2010	HFC Haarlem	88	(2)
2010–2014	Noordwijk	56	(1)

International career^{‡}
1999-2000	Netherlands U19	8	(1)
2000-2001	Netherlands U20	1	(0)

Managerial career
- 2019-: VV Noordwijk (assistant manager)
- * Club domestic league appearances and goals as of 12 February 2020 ‡ National team caps and goals as of 12 February 2020

Marcel Akerboom (born 28 October 1981 in Leiden) is a retired Dutch footballer, who currently the assistant manager for VV Noordwijk.

== Club career ==
During his career, Akerboom played for Fortuna Sittard, FC Zwolle, HFC Haarlem and VV Noordwijk.
