= 1980 in France =

- Decades: 1960s; 1970s; 1980s; 1990s; 2000s
- See also: History of France; Timeline of French history; List of years in France

Events from the year 1980 in France.

== Incumbents ==
- President: Valéry Giscard d'Estaing
- Prime Minister: Raymond Barre

== Events ==
- January – End of Renault 16 production after 15 years. The R16 was the first official production hatchback car in the world when it was launched in 1965.
- February – Launch of the Renault Fuego sporting coupe, which replaces the Renault 15 and Renault 17 ranges.

== Births ==
=== January to March ===
- 1 January – Jennifer Lauret, actress.
- 2 January – Jérôme Pineau, cyclist.
- 9 January – Arnaud Méla, rugby union player.
- 14 January – Guillaume Norbert, soccer player.
- 17 January – Jean-Daniel Padovani, soccer player.
- 23 January – Éric Berthou, cyclist.
- 27 January – Pascal Pédemonte, soccer player.
- 2 February – Florent Balmont, soccer player.
- 6 February – Ludovic Delporte, soccer player.
- 10 February – Sylvain Marchal, soccer player.
- 14 February – Frédéric Belaubre, athlete.
- 20 February – Imanol Harinordoquy, rugby union player.
- 20 February – Damien Renard, orienteering competitor.
- 23 February – Mathieu Berson, soccer player.
- 1 March – Djimi Traoré, soccer player.
- 7 March – Guillaume Moullec, soccer player.
- 13 March – Érik Boisse, épée fencer.
- 14 March – Virginie Pouchain, singer.
- 15 March – Christelle Lefranc, fashion model.
- 18 March – Sébastien Frey, soccer player.
- 21 March – Renaud Connen, soccer player.
- 25 March – Olivier Patience, tennis player.
- 27 March – Nicolas Duvauchelle, actor.
- 28 March – Olivier Thomert, soccer player.
- 30 March – Amélie Perrin, hammer thrower.

=== April to June ===
- 9 April – Isabelle Severino, gymnast.
- 15 April – Pierre-Alain Frau, soccer player.
- 22 April – Nicolas Douchez, soccer player.
- 30 April – Oumar Bakari, soccer player.
- 11 May – Aurore Trayan, archer.
- 13 May – Alexis Bertin, soccer player.
- 21 May – Benoît Peschier, whitewater kayaker.
- 25 May – Nicolas Mas, rugby union player.
- 2 June – Sylvain Cros, swimmer.
- 12 June – Benoît Caranobe, gymnast and Olympic medallist.
- 13 June – Florent Malouda, soccer player.
- 19 June – Jean Val Jean, pornographic actor.
- 22 June – Grégory Gabella, high jumper.
- 23 June – Damien Tixier, soccer player.
- 26 June – Rémy Vercoutre, soccer player.
- 27 June – François-Xavier Ménage, journalist

=== July to September ===
- 5 July – Eva Green, actress.
- 13 July – Cédric Hengbart, soccer player.
- 14 July – Mody Traoré, soccer player.
- 14 July – Jérôme Haehnel, tennis player.
- 22 July – Marc Giraudon, soccer player.
- 22 July – Jérémy Moreau, soccer player.
- 25 July – Diam's, rap artist.
- 1 August – Sylvain Armand, soccer player.
- 1 August – Romain Barras, decathlete.
- 2 August – Guillaume Lacour, soccer player.
- 7 August – Aurélie Claudel, model.
- 10 August – Frédéric Thomas, soccer player.
- 16 August – Julien Absalon, mountain biker.
- 20 August – Samuel Dumoulin, cyclist.
- 22 August – Grégory Leca, soccer player.
- 25 August – Ève Angeli, singer.
- 28 August – Fousseni Diawara, soccer player.
- 11 September – Christophe Le Mével, cyclist.
- 11 September – Julien Sablé, soccer player.
- 18 September – Ludovic Assemoassa, soccer player.
- 19 September – Maxime Méderel, cyclist.
- 26 September – Aurélien Rougerie, rugby union player.
- 28 September – Benjamin Nicaise, soccer player.

=== October to December ===
- 4 October – Ludivine Furnon, gymnast.
- 6 October – Arnaud Coyot, cyclist.
- 6 October – Abdoulaye Méïté, soccer player.
- 7 October – Matthieu Chalmé, soccer player.
- 7 October – Jean Marc Gaillard, cross-country skier.
- 7 October – Pantxi Sirieix, soccer player.
- 14 October – Bertrand Bossu, soccer player.
- 14 October – Audrey Marnay, supermodel.
- 19 October – Vincent Planté, soccer player.
- 25 October – Laurie Cholewa, television host.
- 10 November – Gregory Arnolin, soccer player.
- 12 November – Benoît Pedretti, soccer player.
- 13 November – Benjamin Darbelet, judoka.
- 13 November – Hubert Dupont, soccer player.
- 15 November – Kevin Staut, equestrian champion
- 19 November – Dramane Diarra, basketball player
- 22 November – Sabrina Lefrançois, figure skater.
- 25 November – Romain Poyet, soccer player.
- 26 November – Lionel Faure, rugby union player.
- 29 November – Arnaud Le Gall, politician.
- 12 December – François Dubourdeau, soccer player.
- 12 December – Julien Martinelli, soccer player.
- 15 December – Élodie Gossuin, former beauty pageant winner, municipal politician.
- 16 December – Alban Lenoir, actor
- 19 December – Fabian Bourzat, ice dancer.
- 23 December – Jean-François Coux, soccer player.

=== Full date unknown ===
- Alexis Lemaire, computer scientist and mental calculation champion.

== Deaths ==
=== January to March ===
- 7 January – Simonne Mathieu, tennis player (b. 1908).
- 21 January – Georges Painvin, cryptanalyst (b. 1886).
- 14 February – Marie Besnard, accused serial poisoner (b. 1896).
- 4 March – Alfred Plé, rower and Olympic medallist (b. 1888).
- 12 March – Zekeriya Sertel, Turkish journalist (born 1890)
- 14 March – Julien Moineau, cyclist (b. 1903).
- 21 March – Marcel Boussac, entrepreneur and horse breeder (b. 1889).
- 24 March – Pierre Etchebaster, real tennis player (b. 1893).
- 25 March – Roland Barthes, literary critic and philosopher (b. 1915).

=== April to June ===
- 6 April – Olivier Chevallier, motor cycle racer (b. 1949).
- 12 April – Georges Piot, rower and Olympic medallist (b. 1896).
- 15 April – Jean-Paul Sartre, philosopher, dramatist, novelist and critic (b. 1905).
- 2 May – Théophile Alajouanine, neurologist (b. 1890).
- 16 June – Benoît Fauré, cyclist (b. 1900).
- 17 June – Robert Jacquinot, cyclist (b. 1893).
- 18 June – André Leducq, cyclist, twice Tour de France winner (b. 1904).

=== July to September ===
- 18 July – Andrée Vaurabourg, pianist and teacher (b. 1894).
- 22 July – Pierre Coquelin de Lisle, sport shooter and Olympic gold medallist (b. 1900).
- 1 August – Patrick Depailler, motor racing driver (b. 1944).
- 27 August – André Marchal, organist and organ teacher (b. 1894).
- 29 August – Louis Darquier de Pellepoix, Commissioner for Jewish Affairs under the Vichy Régime (b. 1897).
- 2 September – Claude Ménard, athlete and Olympic medallist (b. 1906).
- 8 September – Maurice Genevoix, author (b. 1890).

=== October to December ===
- 6 October – Jean Robic, road racing cyclist, won 1947 Tour de France (b. 1921).
- 8 October – Maurice Martenot, cellist and inventor (b. 1898).
- 14 October – Louis Guilloux, writer (b. 1899).
- 6 November – Pierre Villon, member of the French Communist Party and of the French Resistance (b. 1901).
- 14 November – Pierre Magne, cyclist (b. 1906).
- 30 November – Bertrand Gille, historian of technology (b. 1920).
- 2 December – Romain Gary, novelist, film director, World War II aviator and diplomat (b. 1914).
- 28 December – Marcel Langiller, international soccer player (b. 1908).

=== Full date unknown ===
- Paul Petard, botanist (b. 1912).
