= Jérémy =

French masculine given name

Jérémy is a French masculine given name. It is a spelling variant of Jérémie, itself the French variant of the biblical name Jeremiah. Its cognate in English is Jeremy which means "God will uplift".

People with the given name Jérémy include:

- Jérémy Abadie (born 1988), a French football player
- Jérémy Acedo (born 1987), a French football player
- Jérémy Amelin (born 1986), a French electro recording artist and entertainer
- Jérémy Berthod (born 1984), a French football player
- Jérémy Blayac (born 1983), a French football player
- Jérémy Chardy (born 1987), a French professional tennis player
- Jérémy Chatelain (born 1984), a French singer, actor and fashion designer
- Jérémy Choplin (born 1985), a French professional football player
- Jérémy Clément (born 1984), a French professional football player
- Jérémy Cordoval (born 1990), a French professional football player
- Jérémy Deichelbohrer (born 1986), a French football player
- Jérémy De Magalhaes (born 1983), a French football player
- Jérémy Denquin (born 1977), a French professional football player
- Jérémy De Vriendt (born 1986), a Belgian football player
- Jérémy Doku (born 2002), a Belgian football player
- Jérémy Faug-Porret (born 1987), a French football player
- Jérémy Florès (born 1988), a French surfer
- Jérémy Gabriel (born 1996), a Quebecer singer
- Jérémy Gavanon (born 1983), a French football player
- Jérémy Hélan (born 1992), a French football player
- Jérémy Henin (born 1977), a French professional football player
- Jérémy Huyghebaert (born 1989), a Belgian football player
- Jérémy Jaunin (born 1991), a Swiss basketball player
- Jérémy Kapone (born 1990), a French actor, singer and songwriter
- Jérémy Labor (born 1992), a French football player
- Jérémy Manière (born 1991), a Swiss football player
- Jérémy Mathieu (born 1983), a French football player
- Jérémy Ménez (born 1987), a French international football
- Jérémy Messiba (born 1988), a French football player
- Jérémy Moreau (born 1980), a French professional football player
- Jérémy Morel (born 1984), a French professional football player
- Jérémy Obin (born 1993), a French football player
- Jérémy Perbet (born 1984), a French football player
- Jérémy Pied (born 1989), a French professional football player
- Jérémy Pinvidic (born 1987), a French professional football player
- Jérémy Pouge (born 1980), a French rower
- Jérémy Roy (cyclist) (born 1983), French road bicycle racer
- Jérémy Roy (ice hockey) (born 1997), Canadian ice hockey defenceman
- Jérémy Sapina (born 1985), a French football player
- Jérémy Serwy (born 1991), a professional football player
- Jérémy Sopalski (born 1981), a French football player
- Jérémy Sorbon (born 1983), a French football player
- Jérémy Spender (born 1982), a French former football player
- Jérémy Stinat (born 1978), a French professional football player
- Jérémy Stravius (born 1988), a French swimmer
- Jérémy Taravel (born 1987), a French football player
- Jérémy Toulalan (born 1983), a French football player

== See also ==
- Jeremy (given name)
- Jérémie (given name)
