= Jeremy (given name) =

- Pronunciation: /ˈdʒɛrɛmi/
- Gender: Male
- Language: English

Other names
- Variant forms: Jer; Jem; Jaz
- Nicknames: Jez, Jezza
- Related names: Jeremiah, Jérémie, Jérémy, Jeremey

Jeremy (/ˌdʒɛrɛmi/) is an English-language male given name, deriving from various translations and interpretations as anglicized and diminutive form of the given name Jeremiah.

== Etymology ==
The name originates from the Hebrew יִרְמְיָהוּ (Yirmeyahu), a theophoric name composed of the verb רוּם (rûm), meaning "to exalt" or "to be high," and יָהּ (Yah), a shortened form of the divine name Yahweh. The name is variously translated as "Yahweh will exalt," "God will uplift," "Yahweh loosens," or "appointed by God."

The name entered English through the Late Latin form Jeremias and the Greek Ieremías (Ἱερεμίᾱς). The vernacular form Jeremy is attested in English from the 13th century.

== Biblical and scriptural significance ==
The name is most prominently associated with Jeremiah, one of the major prophets of the Old Testament, who flourished c. 626–586 BCE. He is the author of the Book of Jeremiah and, traditionally, the Book of Lamentations. Known as the "Weeping Prophet" for his laments over the fall of Jerusalem, his prophecies emphasized repentance, judgment, and hope.

The name is recognized across the Abrahamic religions: Judaism regards Jeremiah as the second of the major prophets; Christianity sees him as a prophet quoted in the New Testament; and Islam recognizes him as a prophet (إرميا).

== New Testament references ==
The name Jeremiah (Greek: Ιερεμιας, Hieremias) appears explicitly three times in the New Testament, all in the Gospel of Matthew, and is rendered "Jeremy" in the King James Version at two of these citations:

- Matthew 2:17 – "Then was fulfilled that which was spoken by Jeremy the prophet, saying…" (quoting Jeremiah 31:15)
- Matthew 16:14 – "…others say Elijah; and others, Jeremias, or one of the prophets."
- Matthew 27:9 – "Then was fulfilled that which was spoken by Jeremy the prophet, saying…" (Zechariah 11:12–13, misattributed to Jeremiah)

The Book of Jeremiah is additionally quoted or alluded to approximately forty times throughout the New Testament, most significantly:

Old Testament source	New Testament reference	Theme
Jeremiah 7:11	Matthew 21:13; Mark 11:17; Luke 19:46	"Den of robbers" (temple cleansing)
Jeremiah 9:24	1 Corinthians 1:31; 2 Corinthians 10:17	"Boast in the Lord"
Jeremiah 31:15	Matthew 2:18	Rachel's lament
Jeremiah 31:31–34	Hebrews 8:8–12; Hebrews 10:16–17	The New Covenant
Jeremiah 12:15	Acts 15:16	Restoration of Israel
Jeremiah 17:10	Revelation 2:23	God searching the heart
Jeremiah 10:7	Revelation 15:3–4	Fear of the King of nations

The most theologically significant quotation is Jeremiah 31:31–34, the "New Covenant" passage, which undergirds the Last Supper narratives and the argument of Hebrews.

== Historical usage and popularity ==
The name was adopted by Puritans in the 17th century alongside the more formal Jeremiah. It experienced a revival in popularity in the United States during the 1970s and 1980s. The name remains in use in English, Norwegian, Swedish, and Danish cultures.

Notable bearers of the name include philosopher and jurist Jeremy Bentham, actor Jeremy Irons, and author Jeremy Clarkson.

Other notable people with the name include:

== In arts and entertainment ==
- Jeremy Beadle (1948–2008), English television presenter, writer and producer
- Jeremy Bowen, Welsh journalist
- Jeremy Brett (1933–1995), English actor, played Sherlock Holmes (1984 to 1994)
- Jeremy Brock, actor and director
- Jeremy Bulloch, English actor
- Jez Butterworth, English playwright, screenwriter, and film director
- Jeremy Camp, Christian musician
- Jeremy Cavaterra, American composer
- Jeremy Clarkson, English broadcaster
- Jaz (Jeremy) Coleman, English musician
- Jeremy Crawshaw (born 2001), Australian-American football player
- Jeremy Davis, bassist for American rock band Paramore
- Jeremy Deller, English artist
- Jeremy Edwards, English television actor known for roles Kurt Benson and Danny Shaughnessy
- Jeremy "Jerma" Elbertson, American YouTuber and voice actor
- Jeremy Fall, (born 1990), American Chef, Restaurateur, and TV Personality
- Jeremy Filsell, English pianist and composer
- Jem Finer, English musician with The Pogues
- Jeremy Gable, American playwright and game designer
- Jeremy Hardy, English comedian
- Jeremy Healy, English singer and DJ
- Jeremy Heywood, British Civil Servant
- Jeremy Irons, English actor
- Jeremy Jordan (singer, born 1973), American singer
- Jeremy Jordan (actor, born 1984), American actor
- Jeremy Kidd (born 1962), British-born contemporary artist
- Jeremy Kyle, English television presenter
- Jeremy Lansman, American community radio advocate, radio station owner, and engineer
- Jeremy Larner (1937–2026), American author, poet, journalist and speechwriter
- Jeremy Latcham, American film producer
- Jeremy Latimore, Australian Rugby League player
- Jeremy Lau (born 1992), Hong Kong singer and actor
- Jeremy Lee (chef), TV chef
- Jeremy Lee (singer) (born 1995), Hong Kong singer, dancer, and actor
- Jeremy Lloyd (1930–2014), English author, screenwriter, poet, and actor
- Jeremy London, American actor with twin actor Jason London
- Jeremy McKinnon, vocalist for American metalcore band, A Day to Remember
- Jeremy Meeks, American model and convicted felon (born 1984)
- Jeremy Northam, English film actor
- Jeremy Paxman, English television presenter
- Jeremy Piven, American actor
- Jeremy Ray, Australian television presenter and video game reviewer
- Jeremy Renner, American actor
- Jeremy Rohmer, contestant of ANTM cycle 20
- Jeremy Rowley, American actor
- Jeremy Scahill, Oscar-nominated and two-time George Polk award-winning journalist
- Jeremy Shada, American actor, notably as the voice of Finn the Human in Adventure Time and GingerBrave in Cookie Run: Kingdom
- Jeremy Sims, Australian actor and director
- Jeremy Sinden, English actor
- Jeremy Sisto, American actor, producer, and writer
- Jeremy Soule, American composer
- Jeremy Spake, English TV presenter
- Jeremy Strong, American actor
- Jeremy Suarez, American actor from The Bernie Mac Show
- Jeremy Sumpter, American actor
- Jeremy Taggart, percussionist for Canadian band Our Lady Peace
- Jeremy Thomas, English writer and film producer
- Jeremy Vine, English radio and television journalist and presenter
- Jeremy Wade, English author and television presenter, host of River Monsters
- Jeremy Ylvisaker, American Multi-instrumentalist
- Jeremy Zerechak, American documentary filmmaker
- Jeremy Fernandez (singer), American singer
- Jeremy Zucker, American singer-songwriter, producer

== In politics ==
- Jeremy Browne, British Liberal Democrat MP (2005–2015)
- Jeremy Clevenger, American politician
- Jeremy Corbyn, British Labour MP for Islington North (1983–) and Leader of the Labour Party (2015–2020)
- Jeremy Dobson, American politician
- Jeremy Hanley (1945–2026), British politician
- Jeremy Hunt, British Conservative MP (2005–) and government minister
- Jeremy Hutchinson (politician) (born 1974), American politician
- Jeremy Lefroy (born 1959), British Conservative MP (2010–2019)
- Jeremy Mosley, American politician
- Jeremy Purvis, Scottish Liberal Democrat MSP (2003–2011), Member of House of Lords (2013–)
- Jeremy Quin (born 1968), British Conservative MP (2015–2024)
- Jeremy Thorpe (1929–2014), British MP for North Devon (1959–1979) and Leader of the Liberal Party (1967–1976)
- Jeremy Wright (politician), British Conservative MP (2005–)

== In sports ==
- Jeremy Abbott, American figure skater
- Jeremy Affeldt, American baseball player
- Jeremy Ausmus, American professional poker player
- Jeremy Banks (born 1999), American football player
- Jeremy Bleich, American-Israeli baseball player
- Jeremy Bloom, American Olympic downhill skier
- Jeremy Bordeleau, Canadian canoeist
- Jeremy Burgess, Honda and Yamaha MotoGP team chief engineer
- Jeremy Cameron, Australian football player
- Jeremy Chinn (born 1998), American football player
- Jeremy Clark (defensive back), American football player
- Jeremy Clarke (racing driver) (born 1986), American racing driver
- Jeremy Clements (born 1985), American racing driver
- Jeremy Combs (born 1995), basketball player for Israeli team Hapoel Ramat Gan Givatayim
- Jeremy Cox (born 1996), American football player
- Jeremy Guscott, English rugby player and commentator
- Jeremy Hill, American football player
- Jeremy Howe, Australian football player
- Jeremy Kellem, American football player
- Jeremy Klein, American skateboard professional
- Jeremy Lamb, American NBA Basketball Player
- Jeremy Larsen, American mixed martial artist
- Jeremy Lin, American NBA Basketball Player
- Jeremy Lucien (born 2000), American football player
- Jeremy Lusk, freestyle motocross driver
- Jeremy Luther (born 1973), American basketball coach
- Jeremy Maclin, American football player
- Jérémy Mathieu, French football player
- Jeremy Mayfield, American NASCAR driver
- Jeremy McGovern, Australian football player
- Jeremy McGrath, American dirt bike racer
- Jeremy McKinney, American football player
- Jeremy McNichols, American football player
- Jeremy Morgan (born 1995), American basketball player
- Jeremy Pargo, American basketball player
- Jeremy Payne (born 2005), American football player
- Jeremy Reaves, American football player
- Jeremy Reed, American baseball player
- Jeremy Rees, professional lacrosse player
- Jeremy Reingold, South African swimmer and rugby player
- Jeremy Roenick, American ice hockey player
- Jeremy Ruckert (born 2000), American football player
- Jeremy Sharp, Australian football player
- Jeremy Shockey, American football player
- Jeremy Sochan (born 2003), Polish-American basketball player
- Jeremy Sowers, American baseball player
- Jeremy Springer (born 1989), American football player and coach
- Jeremy Sprinkle, American football player
- Jeremy Toljan, German soccer player
- Jeremy Tyler, American basketball player
- Jeremy Vuolo, American soccer player
- Jeremy Wariner, American track athlete
- Jeremy Wilcox, Canadian volleyball player
- Jeremy Williams, American player of Canadian football
- Jeremy Wolf (born 1993), American-Israeli baseball player on the Israel National Baseball Team
- Jeremy Peña, Dominican baseball player

== In other fields ==
- Jeremy Allaire, founder of Allaire Corporation
- Jeremy Bamber, English mass murderer
- Jeremy Bentham, English legal reformer and philosopher
- Jeremy Chambers (born 1974), Australian author
- Jeremy Cowan (1923–2013), British historian
- Jeremy Dear, English journalist and union leader
- Jeremy J. Smith, British philologist
- Jeremy Hutchinson, Baron Hutchinson of Lullington (1915–2017), British lawyer
- Jeremy Leggett, English environmentalist
- Jeremy Peat, Scottish economist and a Governor of the BBC
- Jeremy Rosen, English rabbi
- Jeremy Taylor (1613–1667), English author and clergyman
- Jeremy Fernandez, Malaysian-Australian TV presenter

== Fictional characters ==
- Jeremy Hillary Boob, the "nowhere man" from The Beatles' film, Yellow Submarine
- Jeremy the Bear, a Canadian children's TV character based on Les Aventures de Colargol
- Jeremy Belpois, the Code Lyoko's computer genius

== See also ==
- Jérémy, given name
- Jerami Grant (born 1994), American basketball player
- Jeremi, given name
- Jeremie (name), given name and surname
- Jem (given name), a shortened familiar name or nickname for Jeremy
- Jer (disambiguation), as above, shortened version of Jeremy
- Jez (nickname), a nickname for people named Jeremy
