= Jeremy =

Jeremy may refer to:

- Jeremy (given name), an English male given name
- Jérémy, a French given name
- Jeremy (film), a 1973 film
- "Jeremy" (song), a 1992 song by Pearl Jam
- Jeremy (bear), a brown bear who lived at the Camperdown Wildlife Centre
- Jeremy (snail), a garden snail that had a rare condition that caused its shell to coil to the left
- Jeremy, a 1919 novel by Hugh Walpole

== See also ==
- Jeremiah (disambiguation)
- Jeremie (disambiguation)
- Jerome (disambiguation)
- Jeromy (disambiguation)
