= Jezza =

Jezza may refer to:

- Jezža (crater), a crater in the Argyre quadrangle of Mars
- Alex Jesaulenko (born 1945), Australian rules footballer nicknamed Jezza
- Jezza, a nickname for people named Jeremy in Britain
  - Jeremy Clarkson (born 1960), English broadcaster, journalist and writer nicknamed Jezza
  - Jeremy Corbyn (born 1949), British politician and former leader of the Labour Party, nicknamed Jezza
  - Jeremy Kyle (born 1965), English radio and television presenter nicknamed Jezza
- Jezza Uepa, Nauruan powerlifting medalist in the 2011 Pacific Games
- Jezza Neumann, 2011 recipient of the Rory Peck Award
- Jezza Baron, squad member of the Philippine Fuego España F.C.
- Jezza, main character in the British children's TV series Barking!
- Jezza, a 1991 picture book illustrated by Kym Lardner

== See also ==
- Ježa, a settlement in Ljubljana, Slovenia
- Jezza, a settlement near Kampala, Uganda
- Jez (nickname)
- Jessa
- Gazza (disambiguation)
