= Jaz =

Jaz or JAZ may refer to:

== People ==
- Jaz (singer), Bruneian singer
- Jazmin Carlin (born 1990), Welsh swimmer
- Jaz Brisack, American barista and labor organizer
- Jaz Coleman (born 1960), English musician and record producer
- Jaz Deol, British actor
- Jaz Dhami, British-Indian singer
- Jaz Hedgeland, Australian triathlete
- Jaz Lochrie, Scottish musician
- Jaz O'Hara, British human rights activist
- Jaz Rabadia MBE, Energy professional
- Jaz Rai, British Aerospace engineer and chairperson of the Sikh Recovery Network
- Jaz Shelley (born 2000), Australian basketball player
- Jaz Sinclair (born 1994), American actor

== Places ==
- Jaz, Hormozgan, a village in Hormozgan Province, Iran
- Jezeh, Isfahan, a village in Hormozgan Province, Iran, also known as Jaz
- Gaz, Iran, a city in Isfahan Province, Iran, also known as Jaz
- Jaz (island), a Croatian island
- Jaz Beach, on the Montenegro Riviera

== Other uses ==
- Jaz drive, a disk storage system
- Jaz (beer), Malaysia's only locally brewed beer
- JALways (JAZ), a Japanese airline
- ISO 639-3 code for the Jawe language of New Caledonia
- Jaz Hoyt, a fictional character in the American television series Oz
- Jaz Milvane, one of the principal characters on the BBC Radio 4 series Ed Reardon's Week

== See also ==
- Jaz-O (born 1964), American rapper
- Jazz (disambiguation)
