= Vilofoss =

Animal feed company

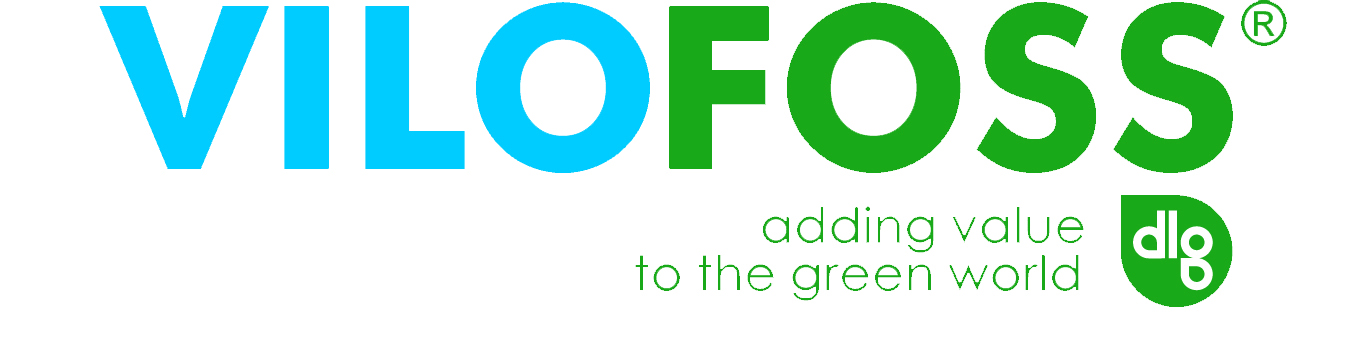
- Vilofoss logo

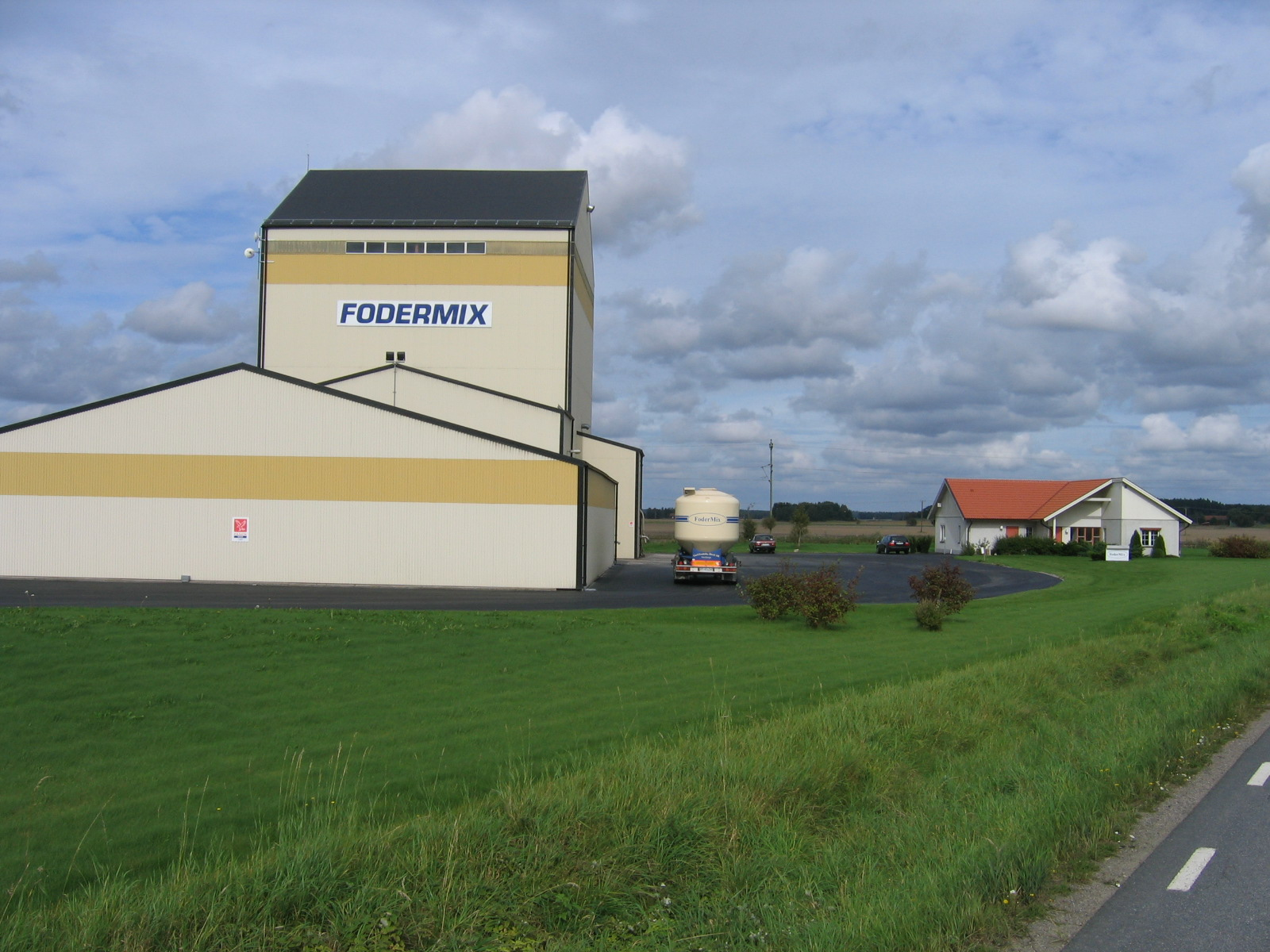
- Fodermix headquarter
- Company type: Subsidiary
- Industry: Animal feed
- Founded: 1930; 96 years ago
- Headquarters: Fredericia, Denmark
- Key people: Dennis Jørgensen (CEO)
- Products: Animal feed, vitamins, supplements
- Brands: Stalosan; FreshFoss; NutriSpar; ProtiSpar; X-Zelit; HooFoss; PeckStone
- Revenue: ▼1,243 million DKr (2023); 1,378 million DKr (2022)
- Operating income: ▼23.0 million DKr (2023); 47.6 million DKr (2022)
- Net income: ▲153 million DKr (2023); 146 million DKr (2022)
- Number of employees: 500
- Parent: DLG Group
- Subsidiaries: Vitfoss; Calcialiment; Deutsche Vilomix; Fodermix
- Website: vilofoss.com

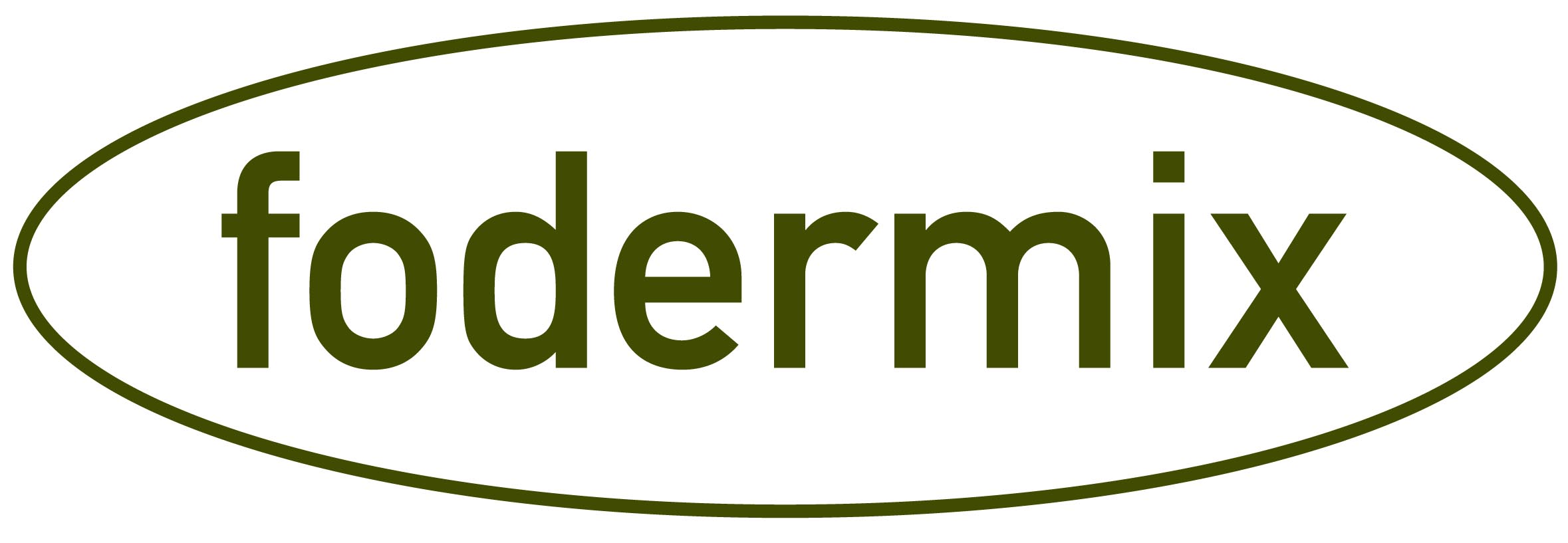
Fodermix logo

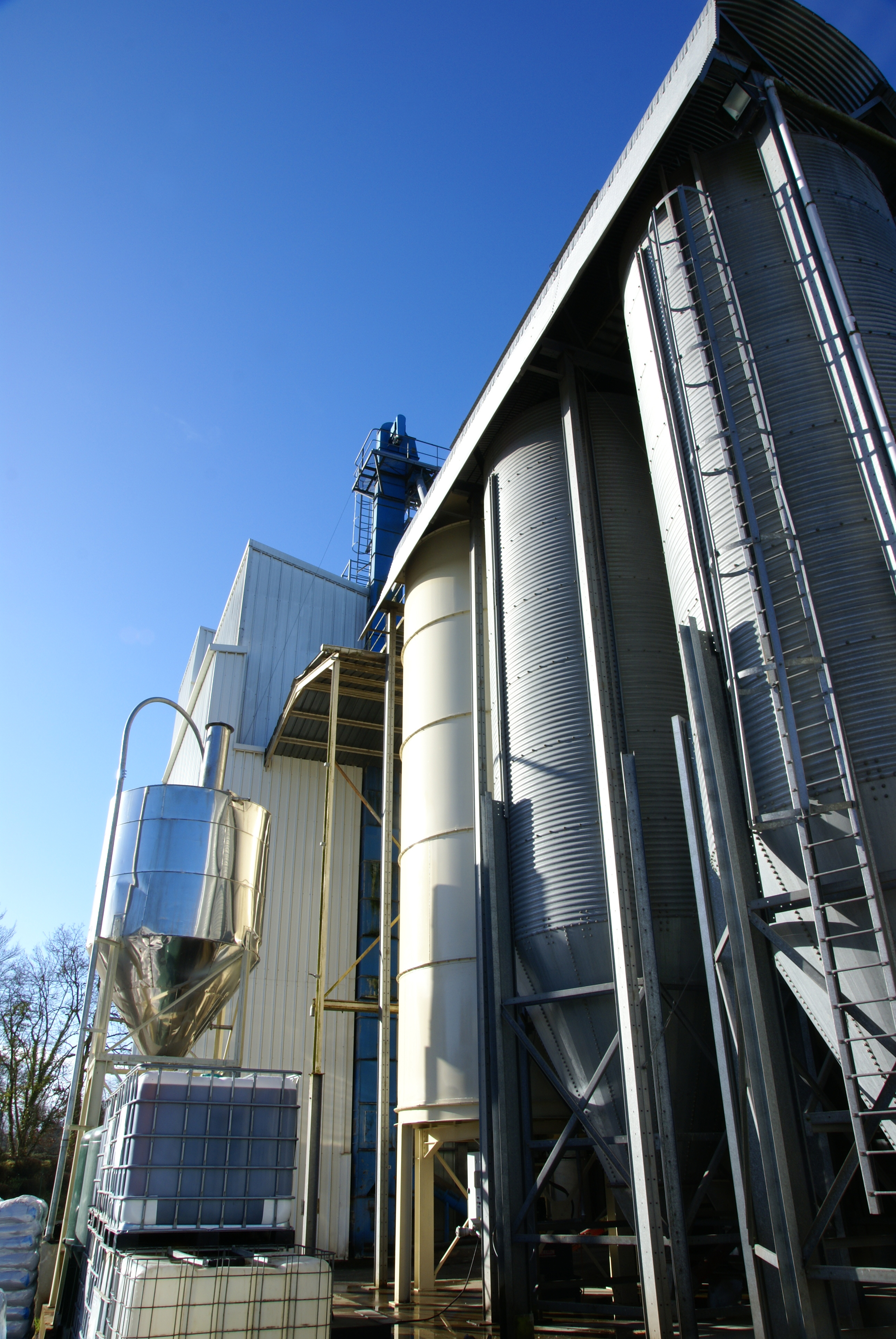
Calcialiment factory

Calcialiment logo

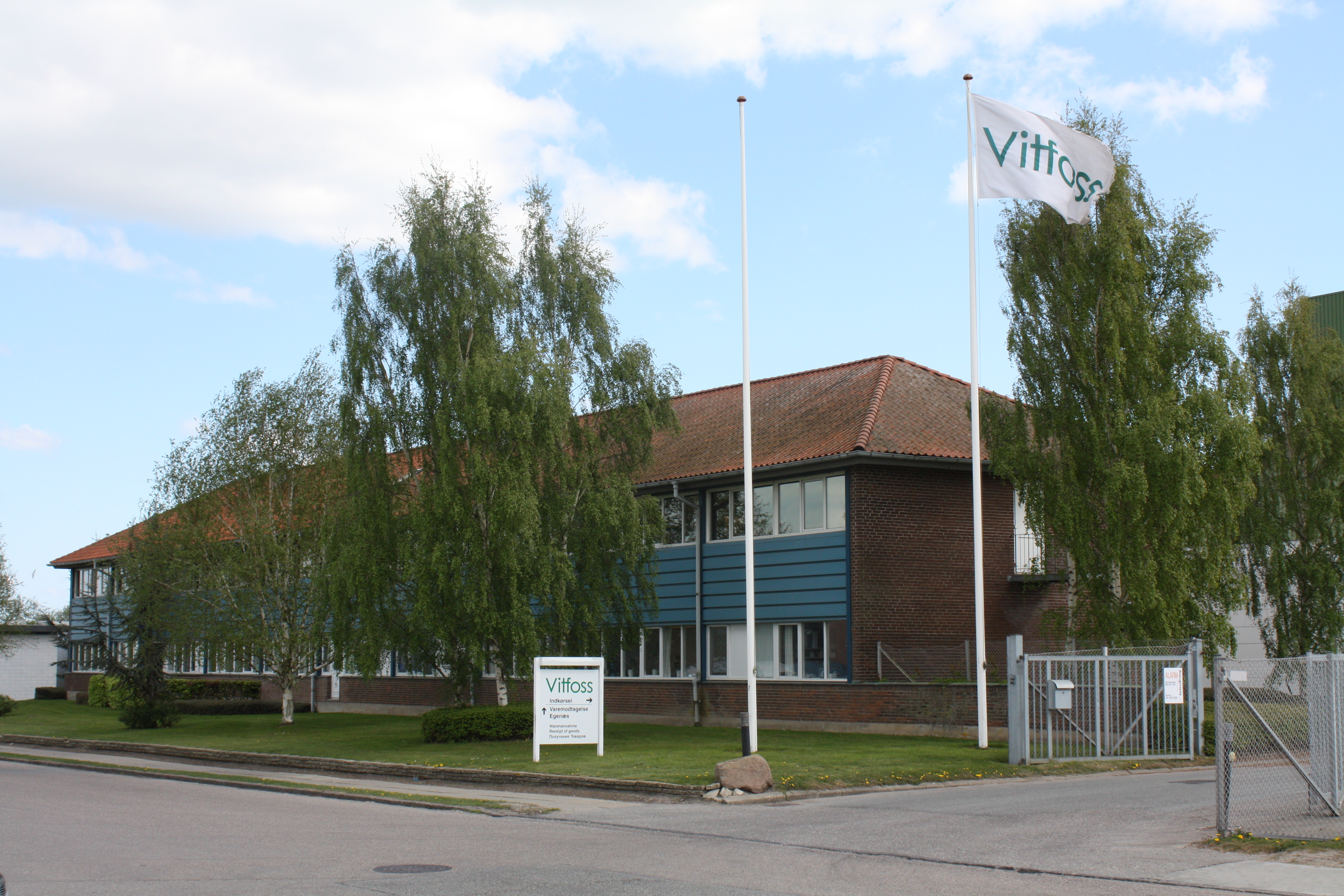
Vitfoss headquarter

Vitfoss logo

Vilofoss is a company that produces and trades with vitamin and mineral premixes for the feedstuff industry. Vilofoss is a brand name that consists of four companies in four different countries; Vitfoss is placed in Denmark, Calcialiment in France, Deutsche Vilomix in Germany and Fodermix in Sweden. They all operate in their country land but when they are trading on international markets, they do it under a mutual name – Vilofoss. Vilofoss has a total of 14 factories producing vitamins and minerals under brands such as: Vitfoss and Stormøllen (Denmark), Fodermix (Sweden), Calcialiment and Echarm (France), Deutsche Vilomix (Germany) and Vilofoss (Russia and Poland). Vilofoss is already one of the three biggest companies in the European market.

Vilofoss is also a part of DLG Group (Dansk Landbrugs Grovvareselskab), which is one of the biggest premix producers in Europe. DLG Group is the largest cooperative farm supplier in Denmark with turnover of more than 5.51 billion in 2010. DLG supplies grain, feedstuffs, fertilizers, chemicals, etc. for farm management and employs more than 5000 people. DLG is currently trying to get a foothold in the Chinese market.

== Deutsche Vilomix part of Vilofoss ==
Deutsche Vilomix is a company specialized in vitamin and mineral premixes for the feedstuff industry. The headquarters of Deutsche Vilomix Tierernährung GmbH are located in Neuenkirchen-Vörden (county ofVechta) in Germany, approx. 30 km north of Osnabrück. Deutsche Vilomix Tierernährung GmbH was founded during the late 1960s as a division of Lohmann Tierernährung in Cuxhaven, Germany. The name VILOMIX is an abbreviation for "Vitamin Lohmann Mix“. Vilomix is one of the biggest premix companies in Europe, part of the Vilofoss brand name along with Vitfoss (Denmark), Calcialiment (France) and Fodermix (Sweden).

== Fodermix part of Vilofoss ==
Fodermix was established in 1993 by Claes Svensson, leveraging his long experience in Swedish feed production, both as a pig producer and a product developer.
In 1997 the construction of a new facility took place in the genuine agricultural district in the centre of Västergötland.
The Danish company Vitfoss A/S and Swedenbased Svenska Foder AB bought the company in 2003 and currently own 50% each. Currently Fodermix is part of Volofoss.

== Calcialiment part of Vilofoss ==
Calcialiment is an animal feed producer based in Brittany. Calcialiment was founded in 1930 in Brittany by Theophile Lognone, watchmaker & jeweller in the Mont Saint-Michel Bay area. As a family business specialising in animal nutrition, the company has developed around 3 core areas: minerals for producing livestock farmers, infancy feed, and premix for industrial farmers.
Calcialiment-Vilofoss is owned partly by Vitfoss and by DLG, which is one of the biggest premix producers in Europe.

== Vitfoss part of Vilofoss ==
Vitfoss is a company specialized in premixes, the main focus being on production and marketing of vitamin and mineral premixes to the feedstuff industry. Vitfoss is one of the largest premix manufacturers in Europe and owned by Dansk Landbrugs Grovvareselskab (DLG), the largest cooperative farm supply in Scandinavia. DLG has activities in Denmark, Sweden, North Germany, Poland and in the Baltic States. In November 2012, Vitfoss became part of Vilofoss in collaboration with Vilomix.
