= Gaza =

Gaza most commonly refers to:

- Gaza Strip, a Palestinian territory on the eastern coast of the Mediterranean Sea
- Gaza City, a city in the Gaza Strip

Gaza may also refer to:

== Places ==
=== Africa ===
- Gaza Empire, a former Nguni kingdom in southern Africa
- Gaza Province, a province of Mozambique
- Gazaland, a region in southern Mozambique and Zimbabwe

=== Middle East ===
- Gaza Governorate, a governorate in the Gaza Strip
- Gaza District, one of the districts of Mandatory Palestine
  - Gaza Subdistrict, Mandatory Palestine
- Ghazzeh, a city in the Western Beqaa District

=== United States ===
- Gaza, Iowa, an unincorporated community
- Gaza, a village in the town of Sanbornton, New Hampshire
- Gaza Strip, colloquial name for Anaheim Island, California, an unincorporated area in Orange County, California
- Little Gaza, nickname for Little Arabia, an Arab-American ethnic enclave in Anaheim, California

=== Elsewhere ===
- Gaza, Karlovac, a section of the city of Karlovac, Croatia
- Klemzig, South Australia, renamed Gaza from 1917 to 1935

== Historical events ==
- Gaza genocide
- Gaza war
- Gaza war protests

== Arts and media ==
=== Film and television ===
- Gaza (film), a 2019 Irish documentary film about the Gaza strip in Palestine
- Gaza: Doctors Under Attack, a 2025 documentary
- "Gaza", an episode of the television program The West Wing (season 5)

=== Music ===
- Gaza (band), a mathcore band from Salt Lake City, Utah
- Sektor Gaza, Russian punk rock band from Voronezh (1987–2000)
- "Gaza", a 2012 song by progressive rock band Marillion

=== Other media ===
- Gaza: An Inquest into Its Martyrdom, a 2018 book by Norman Finkelstein
- Gaza, a warrior in the PlayStation game Legend of Legaia

== People ==
=== Populations ===
- Gaza people, a Nguni people in southern Africa

=== Individuals ===
==== In entertainment ====
- Mattie Lee Price (1869–1899), American performance artist, used 'Gaza' as a stage name
- Xian Gaza (born 1993), Filipino internet personality and businessman

==== In philosophy and religion ====
- Porphyry of Gaza (347–420), Bishop of Gaza 395–420
- Rabbi Gaza (c. 400), Talmudic sage, contemporary of Ravina I (appears in Shabbat 145b and Yevamot 45b)
- Choricius of Gaza (c. 500), Greek sophist and rhetorician
- Gaza Triad, three 6th Century Christian theologians from Gaza city
  - Aeneas of Gaza (d. 518), Neo-Platonic philosopher
  - Procopius of Gaza (465–528), Christian sophist and rhetorician
  - Zacharias Rhetor (d. before 553)
- Dorotheus of Gaza (505–565), Christian abbot
- Theodorus Gaza (1400–1475), Greek humanist
- Nathan of Gaza (1643–1680), Jewish theologian

== Other uses ==
- Gaza (Battle honour), a British World War I award
- Gaza (gastropod), a genus of sea snails
- Gaza Thesis, a thesis used to explain the rise of the Ottoman Empire

== See also ==
- Wadi Gaza, a wadi (river) in Palestine
- Gazza (disambiguation)
- Gazan (disambiguation)
- Ghazi (disambiguation)
- Gazar
