= Jeremia =

Jeremia is a male given name, a variant of Jeremiah. People with the name include:

- Jeremia Nambinga (born 1946), Namibian politician
- Jeremia Nyembe, South African airman
- Jeremía Recoba (born 2003), Uruguayan footballer
