= Jeremie =

Jeremie or Jérémie may refer to:

- Jérémie, a commune in Haiti
- Jeremie (name), given name and surname, includes a list of people with the name
- Jérémie (given name), includes a list of people with the name

== See also ==
- Jeremy (disambiguation)
