= Jeremiah (given name) =

- Gender: Male

Origin
- Origin: Ancient Hebrew
- Meaning: "Yahweh loosens"

Other names
- Nicknames: Jem, Jemmy, Jer, Jez, Jezza, Jerry, Jare, Jere, Jerimald, Jeremy, Jeremia, Darby

Jeremiah (/ˌdʒɛrəˈmaɪ.ə/ JERR-ə-MY-ə) is a male given name meaning "Yahweh loosens", or "Yahweh will raise", or "God is high", and having its origin in ancient Hebrew. Jeremias is a form that it takes in some Romance languages. Jeremiah is sometimes an anglicised form of the Irish Diarmaid, while "Jeremy" is the anglicized of "Jeremiah" in the English language.

The name takes its popularity from the Hebrew prophet Jeremiah.

Those bearing the name include:

== Politicians ==
- Jeremiah S. Bacon (1858-1939), American politician
- Jeremiah Beveridge (1862–1927), American historian and politician
- Jeremiah S. Black (1810–1883), American judge and politician
- Jeremiah Gates Brainard (c. 1759–1830), Justice of the Connecticut Supreme Court
- Jeremiah Brown (politician) (1785–1858), American politician
- Jeremiah Clemens (1814–1865), American novelist and politician
- Jeremiah Jones Colbath (1812–1875), American politician
- Jeremiah Crutchley (1745–1805), English politician
- Jeremiah Denton (1924–2014), US Senator and naval officer
- Jeremiah Koung (born 1978), Liberian politician
- Jeremiah T. Mahoney (1878–1970), American judge
- Jeremiah Manele (born 1968), Solomon Islands politician
- Jeremiah Mason (1768–1848), American politician
- Jeremiah Morrow (1771–1852), American politician
- Jeremiah Nelson (1769–1838), American politician
- Jeremiah O'Brien (Maine politician) (1778–1858), American politician
- Jeremiah O'Donovan "Rossa" (1831–1915), Fenian conspirator
- Jeremiah McLain Rusk (1830–1893), American politician
- Jeremiah Wadsworth (1743–1804), American merchant and politician

== In religion ==
Historic

- Jeremiah (c. 655-586 BCE), Jewish religious leader
- Jeremiah (I), a first-generation Amora sage of the Land of Israel
- Jeremiah bar Abba (fl. 3rd century), a second-generation Amora sage of the Land of Israel
- Jeremiah (II), a third-generation Amora sage of the Land of Israel
- Jeremiah (III), a fourth-generation Amora sage of the Land of Israel
- Jeremiah (Bulgarian priest), a 10th-century priest
- Patriarch Jeremias I of Constantinople (fl. early 16th century, died 1546), Balkan-born religious leader
- Patriarch Jeremias II of Constantinople (c. 1530–1595), Greek religious leader
- Patriarch Jeremias III of Constantinople (1650s-1735), Greek religious leader

Contemporary

- Jeremiah Evarts (1781–1831), American missionary
- Jeremiah Wright (born 1941), American pastor

== Musicians ==
- Jeremiah Birnbaum (born 1978), American singer-songwriter
- Jeremiah Clarke (1674–1707), English composer
- Jeremiah Green (1977–2022), American musician

== In sports ==
- Jeremiah Attaochu (born 1993), American football player
- Jeremiah Baisako (born 1980), Namibian football player
- Jeremiah Boswell (born 1982), American basketball coach
- Jeremiah Byers (born 2001), American football player
- Jeremiah Castille (born 1961), American football player
- Jeremiah Cobb (born 2004), American football player
- Jeremiah Cooper (born 2004), American football player
- Jeremiah Donati, American collegiate athletic director
- Jeremiah Fears (born 2006), American basketball player
- Jeremiah Hall (born 1998), American football player
- Jeremiah Hunter (born 2002), American football player
- Jeremiah Jackson (born 2000), American baseball player
- Jeremiah Jean-Baptiste (born 2001), American football player
- Jeremiah Kelly (1900–1962), Scottish footballer
- Jeremiah Kolone (born 1994), Samoan-American football player
- Jeremiah Kose (born 1993), American football player
- Jeremiah Ledbetter (born 1994), American football player
- Jeremiah Martin (born 1996), American basketball player
- Jeremiah Martin (American football) (born 1999), American football player
- Jeremiah Masoli (born 1988), American football player
- Jeremiah Massey (born 1982), American basketball player
- Jeremiah Mensah (born 2008), German footballer
- Jeremiah Moon (born 1998), American football player
- Jeremiah Mordi (born 1993), Nigerian basketball player
- Jeremiah Owusu-Koramoah (born 1999), American football player
- Jeremiah Poutasi (born 1994), American football player
- Jeremiah Robinson (fl. c. 1930), Irish football player
- Jeremiah Sirles (born 1991), American football player
- Jeremiah Telander (born 2005), American football player
- Jeremiah Trotter (born 1977), American football player
- Jeremiah Trotter Jr. (born 2002), American football player
- Jeremiah Webb (born 2001), American football player
- Jeremiah "Scooby" Williams (born 2003), American football player
- Jeremiah Wilson (American football) (born 2004), American football player

== Others ==
- Jeremiah Boyle (1818–1871), American general
- Jeremiah Curtin (1835–1906), American translator
- Jeremiah Day (1773–1867), American academic
- Jeremiah Dixon (1733–1779), English surveyor
- Jeremiasz Falck (1610–1677), Polish engraver
- Jeremiah Horrocks (1618–1641), English astronomer
- Jeremiah O'Brien (1744–1818), American naval captain
- Jeremiah P. Ostriker (1937–2025), American astrophysicist
- Jeremiah Smith (lawyer) (1759–1842), American jurist and state governor
- Jeremiah Smith (Royal Navy officer) (died 1675), English naval officer
- Jeremiah Tower (born 1942), American chef

== Fictional entities ==
- Jeremiah Arkham, in the Batman franchise
- Jeremiah Valeska, in the American television series Gotham
- Jeremiah Cloutier, in the American television series Oz
- Jeremiah Collins, in the American television series Dark Shadows
- Jeremiah Danvers, Kara Danvers/Supergirl's foster father in Supergirl
- Jeremiah Fink, in Bioshock Infinite and its DLC BioShock Infinite: Burial at Sea
- Jeremiah Gottwald, in the anime Code Geass
- Jeremiah Johnson, the title character of the 1972 film of the same name
- Jeremiah MacKenzie, a character in Outlander
- Jeremiah Otto, a character in Fear the Walking Dead
- Jeremiah Peabody, a maker of green and purple pills in a song
- Jeremiah Smith, in the television series The X-Files
- Jeremiah Surd, in the television series The Real Adventures of Jonny Quest
- Jeremiah Whitewhale, in the television series BoJack Horseman
- King Jeremiah, is a character in the video game Dark Souls (video game)
- Jeremiah, the Filipino dub name of Genkai (see list of YuYu Hakusho characters), in YuYu Hakusho (known in the Philippines as Ghost Fighter)

== See also ==
- Yeremey, Russian-language counterpart
