= Jem (given name) =

Jem is a given name, sometimes as a nickname for James, Jeremiah, Jeremy, Jemma, or Jemima, and sometimes as an anglicized version of the Turkish name Cem.

People with the name include:

- Jem Belcher (1781–1811), English bare-knuckle boxer
- Jem Cohen (born 1962), American filmmaker
- Jem Finer (born 1955), English musician, artist and composer, a founding member of the Pogues
- Jem Hepworth (born 2000), British racing driver
- Jem Karacan (born 1989), English footballer
- Jem Mace (1831–1910), English bare-knuckle boxer
- Jem Shaw (1836–1888), English cricketer
- Jem Smith (1863–1931), English bare-knuckle boxer
- Jem Stansfield (born 1975), inventor and television presenter
- Jem Ward (1800–1884), English bare-knuckle boxer
- Jem Lea, alias of Wendy Soloman, bass player with Slady

== Fictional characters ==
- Jerrica "Jem" Benton, protagonist of Jem, an animated TV series, and the 2015 film Jem and the Holograms
- James Matthew "Jem" Blythe in Anne Shirley franchise
- James "Jem" Carstairs in The Infernal Devices trilogy
- Jem Costello, in the soap opera Hollyoaks
- Jem Finch, in the film and novel To Kill a Mockingbird

== See also ==
- Jem (disambiguation)
