= Gasa =

Gasa or GASA may refer to:

== Companies ==
- GASA, a Swedish company
- Grabaciones Accidentales, a Spanish record label

== Culture ==
- Gasa (poetry), a form of Korean classical poetry
- Gasa (hat)

== Economics ==
- Global Arrangement on Sustainable Steel and Aluminum, a proposed trade agreement between the United States and European Union

== People ==
- Biuku Gasa, a Solomon Islander, one of two scouts who found the crew of John F. Kennedy's Motor Torpedo Boat PT-109

== Places ==
- Gasa District, Bhutan
- Gasa, Bhutan, capital of the Gasa District
- Gasa Dzong, the administrative center of Gasa District
- Gasa (barangay) Medina, Misamis Oriental, Philippines
- Gasa (barangay) Lakewood, Zamboanga del Sur, Philippines
- Xishuangbanna Gasa Airport, airport serving Jinghong, Yunnan, China
- Gasa (crater), a crater on Mars

== See also ==
- Gaza (disambiguation)
