= Pinvidic =

Pinvidic is a surname, and may refer to:

Pinvidic derives from pinvidik which means rich in Breton.

- Brant Pinvidic, Canadian-American television executive
- Jérémy Pinvidic, French football player
