= Gazza (disambiguation) =

Gazza most commonly refers to Paul Gascoigne (born 1967), an English former footballer

Gazza may also refer to:

== People ==
- Gazza (musician) (born 1977), Namibian musician

=== Nickname ===
- Gary Moore (1952–2011), Irish musician
- Valery Gazzaev (born 1954), Russian football coach
- Gary Ablett Sr. (born 1961), Australian Rules footballer
- Garry Kasparov (born 1963), world chess champion
- Gavin Henson (born 1982), Welsh rugby player
- Nathan Lyon (born 1987), Australian cricketer

=== Fictional ===
- Argus Filch, from the Harry Potter series, known in Italian as Argus Gazza (magpie)

== Places ==
- Gazza, an alternate spelling for Gaza City or the Gaza Strip
- Gazza, Tajikistan
- Gazza (Mecca neighborhood), in Mecca, Saudi Arabia

== Other uses ==
- Gazza (fish), a genus of ponyfish
- La gazza ladra, an opera by Rossini
- Mon Gazza, a fictional planet in the Star Wars franchise
- Gazza's Superstar Soccer, a 1989 video game endorsed by Paul Gascoigne
  - Gazza II, a 1990 sequel
- Gazza (TV series), 2022 two-part documentary about Paul Gascoigne

== See also ==
- Gaza (disambiguation)
- Jezza (disambiguation)
- Gasa (disambiguation)
