= Jeromy =

Jeromy may refer to:

- Jeromy Burnitz, American former professional baseball player
- Jeromy Carriere, Canadian computer software engineer
- Jeromy Cox, American colorist
- Jeromy Farkas, Canadian politician
- Jeromy Miles, American football safety

== See also ==
- Jeremy (disambiguation)
- Jeremiah (disambiguation)
- Jeremie (disambiguation)
- Jerome (disambiguation)
