= Yeremyan =

Yeremyan, Yeremian, Eremyan (Armenian: Երեմյան) is an Armenian surname, derived from the given name Jeremiah (Armenian: Երեմիա). Notable people with the surname include:

- Arman Yeremyan (born 1986), Armenian taekwondo athlete
- Hasmik Yeremyan (born 1992), Armenian footballer
- Suren Yeremian (1908–1992), Armenian historian and cartographer
