= GASA =

Danish company that imports and exports flowers, fruits, and young plants

GASA Group Denmark A/S
- Native name: Gartnernes Salgsforeninger
- Industry: import and export of flowers, fruits, and vegetables
- Founded: 2001; 25 years ago
- Owners: Dansk Landbrugs Grovvareselskab (47%); Danish potted-plant producers (27%); Gartnernes Forsikring and a number of banks (26%)

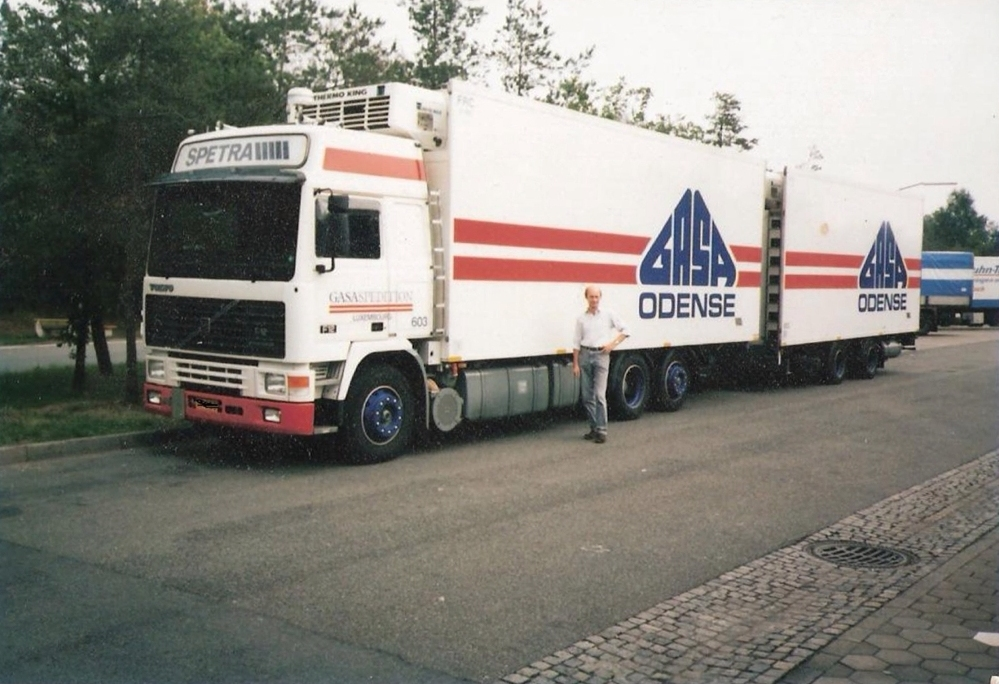
Truck with GASA logo in 1992.

GASA Group (Gartnernes Salgsforeninger; "co-operative marketing organisations") is a Danish company that imports and exports flowers, fruits, and vegetables. Founded in 1929 as a fruit, flowers and vegetable auction co-operative, the multinational company is headquartered in Odense.

About three-quarters of GASA's sales are exports and it is one of the biggest distributors of potted plants in Europe. The company is owned by Dansk Landbrugs Grovvareselskab (47%) and the Danish potted-plant producers (27%). The remaining 26% is owned by Gartnernes Forsikring and a number of banks. GASA Group was established in its present form in 2001 when GASA Aarhus A/S and GASA Odense-Blomster A/S established a collaboration. In 2004, the companies became GASA Group Denmark A/S.
