= Jessa =

Jessa is a feminine given name.

People with this name include:

- Jessa Anderson (born 1985), American Christian singer-songwriter
- Jessa Dillow Crisp (born 1988), American advocate against human trafficking
- Jessa Crispin, American literary critic and editor
- Jessa Gamble (born 1979), Canadian-English writer
- Jessa Holbrook (born 1973), pen name of American writer Saundra Mitchell
- Jessa Khan (born 2001), Cambodian jiu-jitsu athlete
- Jessa Rogers (born 1985), Aboriginal Australian teacher and scholar
- Jessa Seewald (born 1992), American reality TV personality
- Jessa Zaragoza (born 1979), Filipina model, singer and actress

== See also ==
- Jezza (disambiguation)
