= Julio Recoba =

Uruguayan football player (born 1997)

Personal information
- Full name: Julio César Recoba Serena
- Date of birth: 3 April 1997 (age 29)
- Place of birth: Montevideo, Uruguay
- Height: 1.77 m (5 ft 10 in)
- Position: Midfielder

Youth career
- Miramar Misiones
- Nacional
- Liverpool Montevideo

Senior career*
Years	Team	Apps	(Gls)
2017–2018	Basáñez	38	(3)
2019–2021	Fénix	3	(0)
2022	Mar de Fondo	16	(2)
- * Club domestic league appearances and goals as of 1 January 2023

Julio César Recoba Serena (born 3 April 1997) is a Uruguayan professional footballer who plays as a midfielder. He is the son of former Uruguay professional footballer Álvaro Recoba.

== Career ==
Recoba started his senior career with amateur side Basáñez. In January 2019, he was signed by Uruguayan Primera División club Fénix. He made his professional debut on 20 August 2020 in a 2–2 draw against Cerro.

In June 2022, he signed for Uruguayan Segunda División Amateur club Mar de Fondo.

== Personal life ==
Recoba is the son of former Uruguay international Álvaro Recoba. His half-brother Jeremía Recoba is also a professional footballer.
