= Jeremi =

Jeremi is a given name. Notable people with the name include:

- Jeremi Johnson (born 1980), American football player
- Jeremi Kimmakon (born 1994), French footballer
- Jeremi Kubicki (1911–1938), Polish painter
- Jeremi Mohyła (c. 1555 – 1606), Voivode (Prince) of Moldavia
- Jeremi Przybora (1915–2005), Polish poet, writer, actor and singer
- Jeremi Suri, American historian
- Jeremi Wasiutyński (1907–2005), Polish astronomer and philosopher
- Jeremi Wiśniowiecki (1612–1651), member of the aristocracy of the Polish–Lithuanian Commonwealth

== See also ==
- Jerami, given name
- Jeremie (name), given name and surname
- Jeremy (given name)
