= Robert deMaine =

American cellist (born 1969)

Robert DeMaine
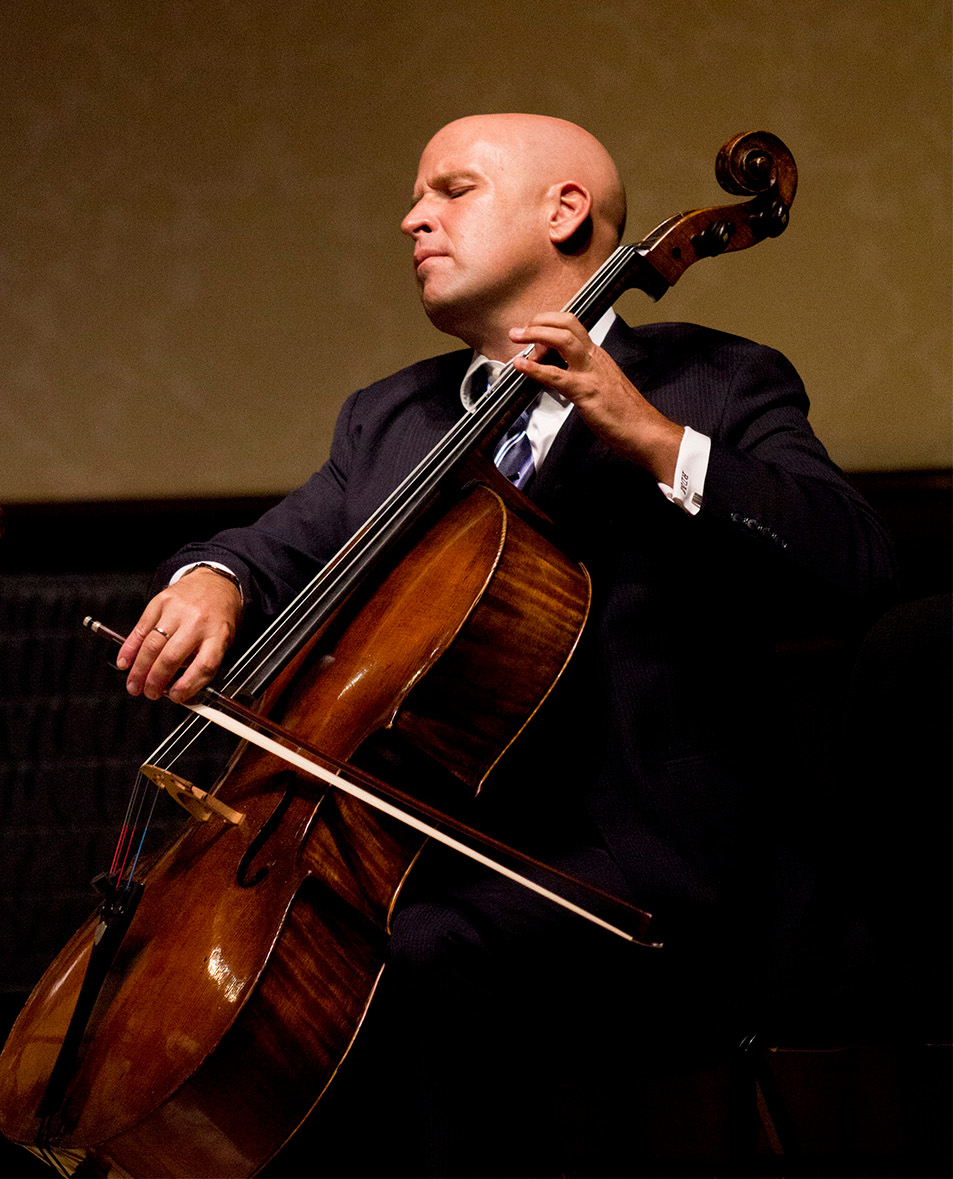
- Born: 6 December 1969 (age 56); Oklahoma City, Oklahoma, U.S.
- Occupation: Classical cellist
- Organizations: Los Angeles Philharmonic, Marlboro Music School and Festival
- Website: www.robertdemaine.com

Robert DeMaine (born December 6, 1969, is an American virtuoso cellist, best known as Principal Cello of the Los Angeles Philharmonic.

== Early life ==
Born in Oklahoma City, Oklahoma into a musical family, DeMaine began learning music at age 4 from his sister, an accomplished cellist.

DeMaine debuted at age 12 with the Oklahoma City Philharmonic, performing Tchaikovsky's Variations on a Rococo Theme. The following year, he met the American cellist and teacher Leonard Rose at the Eastern Music Festival in Greensboro, North Carolina, where Rose invited DeMaine to become his student. DeMaine was accepted for study at the Juilliard School in New York City, the Curtis Institute of Music in Philadelphia, and was also invited to learn privately with Pierre Fournier in Geneva, but his parents made the decision that he should complete his secondary education at home.

After graduating high school — during which he took a nearly two-year hiatus from music studies — on a bet with his best friend, DeMaine entered a national music competition (Naftzger Young Artists Competition in Wichita, Kansas), and won the Grand Prize in the string division. He then received full scholarships to study at the Eastman School of Music and Yale University. Additional studies were undertaken at the Aspen Music Festival, Marlboro Music School and Festival, Meadowmount School of Music, Music Academy of the West, Norfolk Chamber Music Festival, the Gregor Piatigorsky Seminar at the University of Southern California, and briefly at the Kronberg Academy in Germany.

His many teachers include Steven Doane, Felix Galimir, Luis Garcia-Renart, Paul Katz, Aldo Parisot, Leonard Rose, Joseph Silverstein, and János Starker.

== Career ==
The recipient of many significant national and international honors and awards, DeMaine was named the winner of the fifth Irving M. Klein International Competition for Strings in San Francisco, the first cellist to win this important prize.

In 2012, DeMaine was named principal cellist of the Los Angeles Philharmonic by music director Gustavo Dudamel. DeMaine was principal cellist of the Detroit Symphony Orchestra from 2002 to 2012, hired by then-music director, Neeme Järvi. While in his early twenties studying at Yale University, DeMaine served as Core Principal Cellist of the Hartford Symphony Orchestra, and previously in the section of the Rochester Philharmonic Orchestra, his first professional experience while still a freshman at Eastman.

DeMaine has been a music teacher and coach since the age of 12. In his late teens, DeMaine became the teaching assistant to Steven Doane, and later Paul Katz, at the Eastman School of Music. He went on to teach at the Hartford Conservatory, Wayne State University Department of Music in Detroit, University of Michigan, and The Colburn School in Los Angeles. DeMaine has also served on the faculties of the National Orchestral Institute, Music Academy of the West, Montecito Music Festival, Sphinx Academy, Invested Musician, Audition/Perform Academy in Chichester, United Kingdom, and the Accademia Musicale Chigiana in Siena, Italy. He has presented masterclasses at many important music schools worldwide, and was featured artist-faculty at both the Piatigorsky International Cello Festival in Los Angeles, and the Lev Aronson Cello Festival in Dallas.

As soloist with orchestra, he has collaborated with many renowned conductors, including, John Williams, Gustavo Dudamel, Joseph Silverstein, Leonard Slatkin, Alexander Schneider, Walter Hendl, Neeme Järvi, and Zubin Mehta.

Several distinguished contemporary composers have written large-scale works for DeMaine, including John Zoltek (Cello Concerto “Through Tamarack and Pine”), Jeremy Cavaterra (Cello Concerto), Thomas Flaherty (Cello Concerto), Joel Eric Suben (Cello Concerto), and Christopher Theofanidis (“Summer Verses” for Violin and Cello, commissioned by the Seattle Chamber Music Festival for violinist James Ehnes and deMaine).

DeMaine is also a composer and arranger, having written many works which include two concerti and 12 Études-Caprices.

== Personal life ==
DeMaine is of French-Canadian ancestry from his father, and German Prussian from his mother. He is a Roman Catholic.
