= Jem =

Jem or JEM may refer to:

== Arts, entertainment and media ==
=== Film and television ===
- Jem (TV series), or Jem and the Holograms, an American 1980s animated TV series and accompanying toy line
- Jerrica "Jem" Benton, protagonist of Jem (TV series) and Jem and the Holograms (film)

=== Music ===
- Jem (singer) (Jemma Griffiths, born 1975), a Welsh singer songwriter and musician
- J.E.M, a Swedish rap-pop group
- Jem Records, an American record label 1970–1988, resurrected in 2013

=== In print ===
- Jem (novel), by Frederik Pohl, 1979
- "Jem (and Sam)", a 1999 novel by Ferdinand Mount
- Jem (magazine), a 1950s/1960s American men's monthly

== Organisations ==
- Justice and Equality Movement, a Sudanese opposition group
- Jaish-e-Mohammed, militant Islamist group based in Pakistan

== Publications ==
- Journal of Electronic Materials
- The Journal of Emergency Medicine
- Journal of Experimental Medicine

== Other uses ==
- Jem (given name), including a list of people with the name
- Jem (Alevism), a communal worship service
- Jem, Singapore, a shopping mall
- Jewish Education in Media, the parent company of Jewish Broadcasting Service
- Jewish Educational Media, one of many Chabad affiliated organizations
- Japanese Experiment Module, for the International Space Station
- Job-exposure matrix, a tool to assess occupational exposure to health hazards
- Ibanez JEM, an electric guitar model co-designed by Steve Vai

== See also ==
- Gem (disambiguation)
