= Jeremía Recoba =

Uruguayan footballer (born 2003)

Personal information
- Full name: Jeremía Alexandre Recoba Perrone
- Date of birth: 8 October 2003 (age 23)
- Place of birth: Como, Italy
- Height: 1.76 m (5 ft 9 in)
- Position: Midfielder

Team information
- Current team: Las Palmas
- Number: 9

Youth career
- 2017–2021: Danubio
- 2021–2023: Nacional

Senior career*
Years	Team	Apps	(Gls)
2023–2025	Nacional	51	(11)
2025–	Las Palmas	6	(0)
- * Club domestic league appearances and goals as of 26 November 2025

Jeremía Alexandre "Jere" Recoba Perrone (born 8 October 2003) is a professional footballer who plays as a midfielder for Segunda División club Las Palmas. Born in Italy to former Uruguay professional footballer Álvaro Recoba, he is a citizen of both countries.

== Early life ==
Recoba was born in Como, Italy. His father, Álvaro Recoba, was a long-term Uruguay international footballer who spent most of his career in Italy, primarily with Inter Milan. His mother is Lorena Perrone, who is of Italian descent. His half-brother Julio Recoba is also a footballer.

While the most common spelling of the name Jeremiah in Spanish is Jeremías, Recoba's father wrote the name incorrectly on his birth certificate.

== Club career ==
=== Nacional ===
After playing in the youth ranks of Danubio, Recoba signed for Nacional in 2021; his father had made the same move in 1996. In September 2023, he signed his first professional contract at Nacional, to last through 2024.

Recoba made his professional debut on 29 October 2023 in a 4–0 Copa Uruguay win over Potencia. On the opening day of the 2024 season, he played the last eight minutes as a substitute for Mauricio Pereyra. On 28 February, he was given a surprise first start in a Copa Libertadores group game at home to Venezuela's Academia Puerto Cabello also at the Estadio Gran Parque Central, winning 2–0.

On 20 April 2024, Recoba scored his first goal in his 14th match – a 6–2 home win over Rampla Juniors in the domestic league – having already registered two assists in his career. Four days later, he netted again in a 2–1 Libertadores group win over another Venezuelan opponent, Deportivo Táchira; he was congratulated for this feat by former Nacional player Luis Suárez.

=== Las Palmas ===
On 19 July 2025, Recoba joined Spanish club Las Palmas on a three-year contract. The Segunda División club bought 50% of his economic rights for an initial fee of US$750,000, with the fee set to double if the club won promotion to La Liga or he was sold before the end of his contract.

== International career ==
Recoba is eligible to represent Italy or Uruguay at international level. He has stated he would only play for the latter.

== Career statistics ==
As of match played 6 July 2025

Appearances and goals by club, season and competition
Club	Season	League			Cup		Continental		Other		Total	
Club	Season	Division	Apps	Goals	Apps	Goals	Apps	Goals	Apps	Goals	Apps	Goals
Nacional	2023	UPD	0	0	1	0	0	0	0	0	1	0
Nacional	2024	UPD	30	7	4	1	10 (Note: Appearances in Copa Libertadores)	1	1 (Note: Appearance in Torneo Intermedio final)	0	45	9
Nacional	2025	UPD	21	4	0	0	5	0	2 (Note: One appearance in Torneo Intermedio final; one appearance, one goal in Supercopa Uruguaya)	1	28	5
Nacional	Total		51	11	5	1	15	1	3	1	74	14
Las Palmas	2025–26	Segunda División	0	0	0	0	—		—		0	0
Career total			51	11	5	1	15	1	3	1	74	14
