= Jare =

Jare may refer to:

- Jare (rapper), full name Jare Joakim Brand, a Finnish rapper part of the Finnish duo Jare & VilleGalle
- Jare Henrik Tiihonen, a Finnish rapper better known as Cheek
- Jare, Bosnia and Herzegovina, a village in Bosnia and Herzegovina
- Jare IV Nunataks, a group of four aligned nunataks, north-northeast of Mount Gaston de Gerlache in the Queen Fabiola Mountains
- Japanese Antarctic Research Expedition
- Eva Jare (born 1947), Finnish footballer
