= Jeramie =

Jeramie is a given name. Notable people with the name include:

- Jeramie Kling (born 1982), American drummer, audio engineer
- Jeramie Rain (born 1948), American actress
- Jeramie Richardson (born 1983), American football player

== See also ==
- Jerami, given name
- Jeremie (name), given name and surname
