= Jez =

Jez may refer to:

== People ==
- Jez (nickname), most commonly shorthand for the given names Jeremy, Jeremiah, Jerahmeel (roughly homophonous to "Jers" in non-rhotic accents); Jezabel and Jezreel.

=== Surname ===
- František Jež (born 1970), Czech ski jumper
- Ignacy Jeż (1914–2007), Polish Catholic bishop
- Jadranka Jež (born 1960), Yugoslav and later Austrian handball player
- Jerzy Jeż (born 1954), Polish slalom canoeist
- Michael Jez (born 1954), Australian rules footballer
- Róbert Jež (born 1981), Slovak footballer

== Other uses ==
- Jeż coat of arms
