= Xian Gaza =

Filipino influencer, entrepreneur and fugitive (born 1993)

- Born: Christian Albert Soriano Gaza; July 5, 1993 (age 33); Malabon, Philippines
- Occupations: Entrepreneur; Influencer
- Status: At-large
- Convictions: 11 counts of violation of the Bouncing Check Law (2018)
- Penalty: 5 years and six months imprisonment

Instagram information
- Page: Christian Albert Gaza
- Genre: Blog
- Followers: 782 thousand

Christian Albert Soriano Gaza (born July 5, 1993) professionally known as Xian Gaza, is a Filipino internet personality and fugitive. In 2018, he was convicted on 11 counts of violating the Bouncing Check Law in connection of ₱2.6 million (US$52,791.88) investment scheme related to a coffee shop with Melinda Cruz and Jaime Asuncion.

== Personal life ==
Christian Albert Soriano Gaza was born in July 5, 1993, in Malabon, Philippines. Gaza is known for asking out various celebrities for a date. In 2017, Gaza asked actress Erich Gonzales for a coffee date through a billboard. Amused at first, Gonzales eventually rejected Gaza's advances after controversies about him arose. In 2020, he attempted to win Nadine Lustre's affection by sending her a red Ford Mustang sports car. In 2021, he rented a billboard in Seoul to put up an advertisement asking Blackpink member Jennie for a date. Fans of the K-pop artist were critical of the move.

== Career ==
=== 2017–2018: Guanxiqian Group, Erich Gonzales billboard, and scam allegations ===
Gaza claims to be the president and CEO of Hong Kong-based Guanxiqian Group. He also claims to be the founder of Gazaboy Group of Companies and Gazera Media.

He first came to wider public attention in mid-2017 for publicly asking out Filipino actress Erich Gonzales for a coffee date via a billboard. Gonzales declined the invitation, stating that she was not comfortable with Gaza. Cryssa Celestino of Preen characterized Gaza as a "creepy guy" and described the billboard as "not cute" for a romantic comedy style gesture toward Gonzales.

Allegations of him being a scammer arose soon after involving his ventures. This includes his averted ventures with the Haiyan Shirt Project charity project for victims of Typhoon Haiyan (Yolanda) and Filipino Vines, a social media venture. This also includes his transaction with a buy-and-sell business of Ella Cruz's father where Gaza intended to buy a Toyota Fortuner.

=== 2018–2021: Arrest and later exile ===
In April 2018, a warrant of arrest was issued against Gaza for allegedly violating the Bouncing Check Law. He got involved in a ₱2.6 million (US$52,791.88) investment scheme involving a coffee shop with Melinda Cruz and Jaime Asuncion. Gaza admitted to scamming the couple and surrendered himself to the Malabon City police on April 12, 2018. He appealed to his supporters for ₱160,000 (US$3,248.73) for his bail, despite his bail bond fixed at ₱126,000 (US$2,558.38). He was released a day later after being able to secure funds for his bail. In June 2018, he was sentenced to five years and six months of imprisonment for 11 counts of violation of the Bouncing Check Law.

On September 30, 2018, Gaza took a flight abroad to Hong Kong to evade arrest. His account of his supposed escape by booking multiple flights was dismissed by the Bureau of Immigration as a hoax and considered filing a case against him for making a mockery of airport procedure though admitted that he was cleared to depart the country due to having no derogatory record left on Gaza at the time.

=== 2021–present: Xian Coin and life in exile ===
In 2021, Gaza released his own cryptocurrency which he dubbed as the Xian Coin (XNC). The Securities and Exchange Commission (SEC) has issued an advisory in June 2021 against the venture. The SEC concludes that XNC indicates a Ponzi scheme. In December 2021, the SEC has filed a cease and desist order against the venture. It is powered through the Ethereum blockchain and is traded exclusively by its holders. It is purportedly exchangeable to Colombian peso, Mexican peso, Brazilian real, Peruvian sol and Philippine peso. It is associated with the blockchain game Surreal Estate.

In 2025, Gaza drew criticism after a Facebook post on August 13 in which he alleged that a member of the girl group Bini was sexually active. Netizens noted that the statement could contribute to the sexualization and harassment of women.

In October 2025, Gaza is reportedly filming for vertical series entitled Loverboi under director Albert Langitan. Gaza who cannot go to the Philippines due to pending charges was filmed in Thailand.
