= Kym Lardner =

Australian writer and illustrator

- Born: 1957 (age 68–69) Adelaide, South Australia, Australia
- Occupation: Children's author; Illustrator; Storyteller
- Genre: Children's literature; Picture books
- Notable works: The Sad Little Monster and the Jelly Bean Queen; Grandpa's Horses; Arnold the Prickly Teddy

Kym Lardner (born 1957 in Adelaide, South Australia), is an Australian children's author, illustrator, and storyteller.

== Writing ==
His first picture book The Sad Little Monster and the Jelly Bean Queen was published by Hodder and Stoughton in 1981. After many years of live storytelling in Australian schools his show was recorded by the ABC (Australian Broadcasting Corporation). Kym continues to perform in schools, at children's festivals and has visited London twice for storytelling in schools there. Kym Lardner continues to write picture books now illustrated by his son, Oliver. Kym is preparing a sequel to his first book to be entitled "Sad Little Monster comes back" as well as two other volumes being the back stories of the two characters.

== Bibliography ==
=== Picture books ===
- The Sad Little Monster and the Jelly Bean Queen (1981)
- Grandpa's Horses (1986)
- Arnold the Prickly Teddy (1989)
- Jezza (1991) written by Krista Bell - illustrated by Kym
- The Coat-hanger Horse (1992)
- The Naked Penguin (2008) illustrated by Oliver Lardner (son)
- The Dragon's Lie (2009) illustrated by Oliver Lardner (son)

=== Audio recordings ===
- McMuscles and other stories for giggling (1996)
- Sunglasses and more stories for giggling (1996)
- Bandaid and other stories for giggling (1998)
- Father and son stories a compilation from his previous CDs (2004)
