= Jérémy Denquin =

French footballer (born 1977)

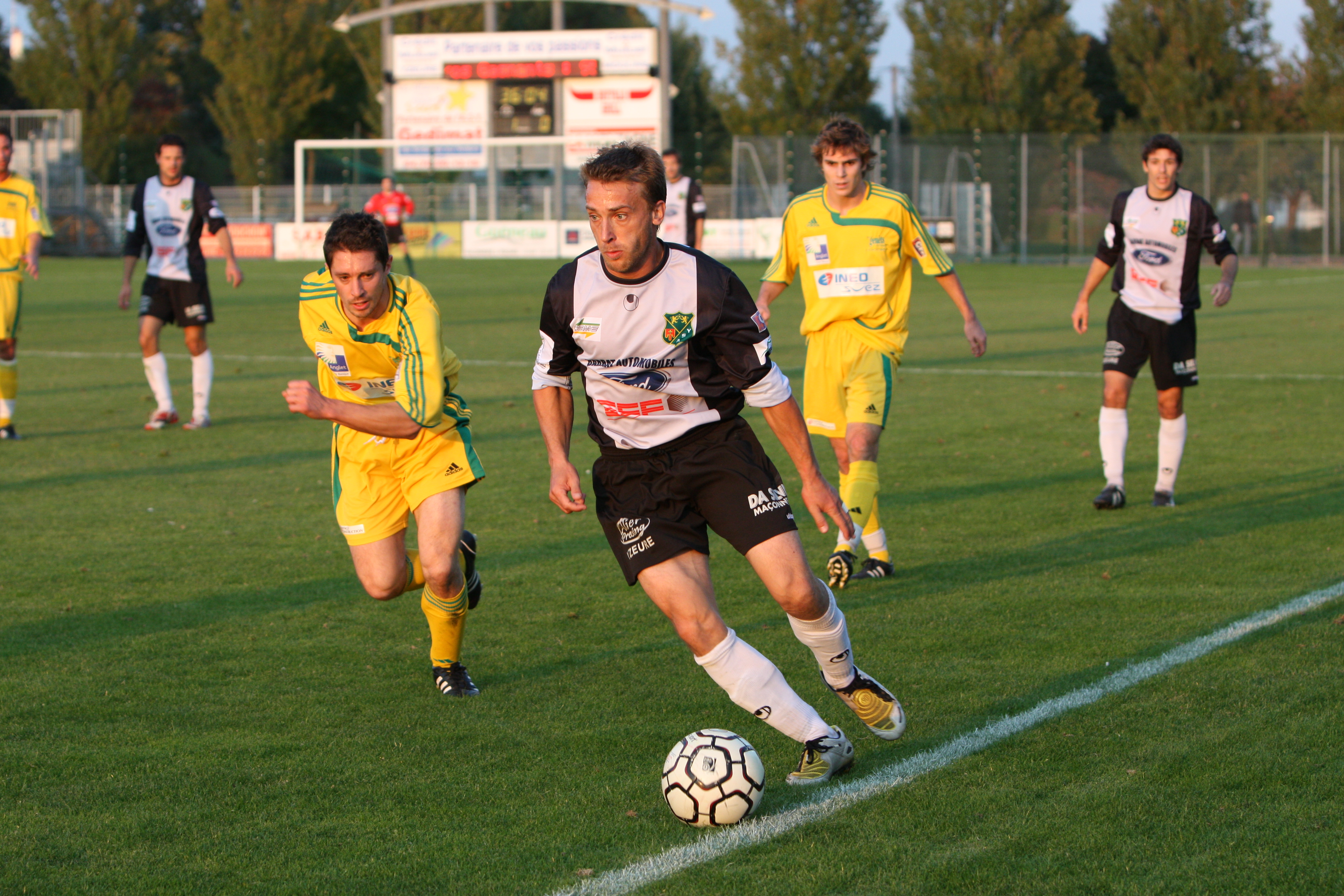

Personal information
- Date of birth: 18 May 1977 (age 49)
- Place of birth: Maubeuge, France
- Height: 1.73 m (5 ft 8 in)
- Position: Midfielder

Team information
- Current team: AS Yzeure

Senior career*
Years	Team	Apps	(Gls)
1993–1997	Lille (B team)		
1994–1997	Lille	10	(0)
1996–1997	→ USL Dunkerque (loan)		
1998	Le Mans	8	(0)
1998–2000	USL Dunkerque		
2000–2002	Stade Reims		
2002–2005	Clermont Foot	55	(7)
2005–2006	USL Dunkerque		
2006–	AS Yzeure		
- * Club domestic league appearances and goals as of 20:33, 26 November 2009 (UTC)

Jérémy Denquin (born 18 May 1977 in Maubeuge) is a French professional footballer. He currently plays in the Championnat de France amateur for AS Yzeure.

Denquin played on the professional level in Ligue 1 for Lille OSC and in Ligue 2 for Lille OSC, Le Mans Union Club 72 and Clermont Foot.
