= Jérémie (given name) =

Jérémie (French pronunciation: [ʒeʁemi]) is a French masculine given name, and the French version of Jeremiah. A common variant is Jérémy and its cognate in English is Jeremy. The name may refer to:

== People ==
- Jérémie Aliadière (born 1983), French football player
- Jérémie Azou (born 1989), French rower
- Jérémie Boga (born 1997), French football player
- Jérémie Bonnelame (born 1938), Seychellois politician
- Jérémie Carboni (born 1980), French director
- Jérémie Colot (born 1986), French figure skater
- Jérémie Elkaïm (born 1978), French actor
- Jérémie Galland (born 1983), French cyclist
- Jérémie Iordanoff (born 1983), French politician
- Jérémie Janot (born 1977), French football player and coach
- Jérémie N'Jock (born 1980), Cameroonian football player
- Jérémie Pauzié (1716–1779), Swiss jeweller
- Jérémie Renier (born 1981), Belgian actor
- Jérémie Zimmermann (born 1978), French computer scientist

== Fictional characters ==
- Jeremie Belpois, the protagonist in Code Lyoko

== See also ==
- Jeremie (name), given name and surname
- Jérémy, given name
