= Jérémy Messiba =

French footballer (born 1988)

Personal information
- Date of birth: January 1, 1988 (age 38)
- Place of birth: Pointe-à-Pitre, Guadeloupe
- Height: 1.84 m (6 ft 0 in)
- Position: Midfielder

Team information
- Current team: Bergerac (assistant)

Youth career
- 2003–2007: Auxerre

Senior career*
| Years | Team | Apps | (Gls) |
| 2007–2009 | Auxerre B | 29 | (3) |
| 2009–2010 | AJ Auxerre | 4 | (1) |
| 2010–2011 | SC Selongey | 1 | (0) |
| 2011–2016 | Luçon VF | 125 | (10) |
| 2016–2017 | US Saint-Malo | 23 | (0) |
| 2017–2020 | Stade Bordelais | | |
| 2020–2021 | Bergerac | 0 | (0) |

Managerial career
- 2019–2021: Stade Bordelais (youth)
- 2021–: Bergerac (assistant)
- 2022–: Bergerac (youth)
- * Club domestic league appearances and goals

Jérémy Messiba (born January 1, 1988, in Pointe-à-Pitre) is a retired French footballer.

== Career ==
Messiba began his career 2003 in the youth side for AJ Auxerre and was 2007 promoted to the reserve team.

== International career ==
He is former France national under-18 football team member and earned in two years eighteen caps.
