= Jemima =

Jemima or Jemimah (/dʒəˈmaɪmə/ jə-MY-mə) is a feminine given name of Hebrew origin (Hebrew: יְמִימָה, romanized: Yəmīmā or Yemimah) meaning 'dove'. It may refer to:

== People ==
- Jemima Blackburn (1823–1909), Scottish painter
- Jemima Boone, daughter of Daniel Boone captured by Indians in 1776—see Capture and rescue of Jemima Boone
- Jemima Goldsmith (born 1974), English journalist, editor, heiress and activist
- Jemimah Kariuki, Kenyan doctor
- Jemima Kirke (born 1985), English-American actress
- Jemima Montag (born 1998), Australian female Olympic racewalker
- Jemima Morrell (1832–1909), English traveller and illustrator
- Jemima Nicholas (1755–1832), Welsh woman who captured 12 drunk French soldiers in the Battle of Fishguard, the "last invasion of Britain"
- Jemima Osunde, Nigerian actress, model and presenter
- Jemima Parry-Jones (born 1949), British authority on birds of prey, conservationist and author
- Jemimah Rodrigues (born 2000), Indian cricketer
- Jemima Rooper (born 1981), English actress
- Jemima Sumgong (born 1984), Kenyan long-distance runner
- Jemima von Tautphoeus (1807–1893), Irish novelist
- Jemima West (born 1987), Anglo-French actress
- Jemima Wilkinson (1752–1819), American preacher and evangelist
- Jemima Yorke, 2nd Marchioness Grey (1723–1797)

== Biblical and fictional characters ==
- Jemima (Bible), daughter of Job
- Jemima (cat), a character in the musical Cats
- Jemima, a duck in the children's book The Tale of Jemima Puddle-Duck by Beatrix Potter
- Jemima, a doll in the various versions of the television show Play School
- Jemima Potts, the daughter in the 1968 film Chitty Chitty Bang Bang
- Jemima "Jed" Marshall, the villain's mistress in the novel The Night Manager by John le Carré and on the British TV mini-series of the same name
- Jemima Shore, an investigative journalist in a series of crime novels by Antonia Fraser
- Aunt Jemima, an advertising character for a food brand
- Old Aunt Jemima, a blackface minstrel character
