= Jer =

Jer or JER may refer to:

== Places ==
- Pic du Jer, a peak in the Hautes-Pyrénées, France
- JER, abbreviation for Jersey, a British Crown Dependency off the coast of Normandy, France

== Language ==
- a yer or jer, a Proto-Slavic vowel, or letter of the Cyrillic (ъ, ь) or Glagolitic alphabet
- jēr, the Gothic alphabet equivalent of jēran (ᛃ), of the j-rune of the Elder Futhark
- jer, ISO 639-3 code for the Jere language, a dialect cluster of Kainji languages in Nigeria

== Given name ==
- Jeremiah Jer Collison (1890-?), Irish hurler and Gaelic footballer
- Jeremiah Jer Doheny (1874–1929), Irish hurler
- Jeremiah Jer Dwyer (1854-?), Irish hurler
- Jeremy Jer Lau (born 1992), Hong Kong singer
- Jer Norberg (1873-?), Irish hurler
- Gerard Patrick Jer D. O'Connor (born 1940), Irish former Gaelic footballer

== Other uses ==
- Jer., an abbreviation for the Book of Jeremiah in the Hebrew Bible
- Journal of the Early Republic, a peer-reviewed academic journal which focuses on the early history and culture of the United States from 1776 to 1861
- JER, IATA code for Jersey Airport, on the island of Jersey
- JER, musical project of Jeremy Hunter, better known as Skatune Network
