= Jeremy Cavaterra =

American composer and pianist

Jeremy Cavaterra (born February 5, 1971) is an American composer and pianist.

== Biography ==
Born in New York City, Jeremy Cavaterra spent his early life in New England before moving to Los Angeles, where he studied piano with Tania Agins and Robert Turner, as well as composition and theory with Mark Carlson. He returned to New York to study composition with Giampaolo Bracali at Manhattan School of Music. His music has been performed throughout the US, Europe, and the UK. He has received commissions for works from such soloists as Gustavo Díaz-Jerez and Robert deMaine, from orchestras such as The Young People's Symphony Orchestra, The Master Sinfonia, and The Mission Chamber Orchestra of San Jose, as well as from chamber ensembles such as Pacific Serenades, The Salastina Society, People Inside Electronics, and The Myriad Trio.

From 2010 to 2018, Cavaterra was Composer-in-Residence for The Salastina Music Society in Los Angeles. Beginning with Three Neruda Arias, premiered by soprano Elizabeth Futral, Salastina commissioned a total of twelve pieces from Cavaterra during his tenure, as well as fourteen arrangements, for various chamber combinations ranging from two to nine instruments.

Since 2018, Cavaterra has been Composer-in-Residence for Young People's Symphony Orchestra.

Cavaterra is currently completing a cello concerto for Robert deMaine, principal cellist of The Los Angeles Philharmonic, as well as a set of Fantasy-Études for pianist Gustavo Díaz-Jerez, the first of which was recently premiered on Virtual Reality Piano, the world's first VR classical music channel, to enthusiastic reviews.

== Selected works ==
=== Orchestral ===
- Monterey Suite (2012)
- Lost Coast (2016)
- Ascent to the Sierras (2018)
- Rhapsody on a Windy Night (2022)
- Swash and Buckler (2026)
- Gegenschein (orchestral version, 2026)

=== Chamber music ===
- March and Divertmento for violin and piano (2006)
- Sonata for Violin and Viola (2007)
- Fantasy for Four Instruments for clarinet, bassoon, viola, and piano (2008)
- Arctic Autumn for two violins (2011)
- Trio for Harp, Flute, and Viola (2012)
- Sextet for piano, string quartet, and bass (2014)
- The Nightly Shades for string quartet and percussion (2015)
- Nemeton for oboe and string quartet (2016)
- Capriccio Concertante for clarinet, harp, and string quintet (2017)
- Music to Sit Down and Play for flute and piano (2019)
- Blue Winter for violin solo, archlute, string quartet, and bass (2019)

=== Solo instrumental ===
- Six Character Pieces for piano (1994)
- Gegenschein for magnetic resonator piano (2015)
- Fantasy-Études for piano (2022)

=== Vocal ===
- Three Neruda Arias for soprano, alto flute, English horn, harp, and string quintet (2010)
- Rossetti Songs for baritone, English horn, archlute, two violins, and cello (2011)

=== Concertante ===
- Concerto for Cello and Orchestra (commissioned)
