= Gazar =

Silk or wool plain weave fabric made with high-twist double yarns woven as one

Gazar is a silk or wool plain weave fabric made with high-twist double yarns woven as one. Gazar has a crisp hand feel and a smooth texture.

Silk gazar is much used in bridal and evening fashion due to its ability to hold its shape. Gazar was developed by the Swiss textile firm Abraham in collaboration with Spanish-Basque couturier Cristóbal Balenciaga, who featured silk gazar in his collections of 1960–68. Balenciaga's mastery of this gleaming, lightweight fabric with its "claylike" ability to hold its shape was exemplified by the trapezoid wedding gowns in his collections of 1967 and 1968.
