= Jer Dwyer =

Irish hurler

Personal information
- Native name: Diarmuid Ó Dubhuir (Irish)
- Born: 1854 Thurles, County Tipperary, Ireland
- Died: Unknown
- Occupation: Farmer

Sport
- Sport: Hurling
Club
- Years: Club
- Thurles
Club titles
- Tipperary titles: 1
Inter-county
- Years: County
- 1887: Tipperary
Inter-county titles
- All-Irelands: 1

Jeremiah "Jer" Dwyer (1854 – ?) was an Irish hurler who played for the Tipperary senior team.

Dwyer made his first appearance for the team during the inaugural championship of 1887. During that successful year he won one All-Ireland medal.

At club level Dwyer was a one-time county club championship medalist with Thurles.
