= Jérémy Spender =

French footballer (born 1982)

Personal information
- Date of birth: April 13, 1982 (age 44)
- Place of birth: Toulon, France
- Height: 1.85 m (6 ft 1 in)
- Position: Defender

Team information
- Current team: Auxerre U-15 (manager)

Youth career
- 1999–2002: Auxerre

Senior career*
Years	Team	Apps	(Gls)
2002–2009	Auxerre B	43	(5)
2006–2009	Auxerre	4	(0)
2009–2010	Auxerre C	6	(0)

Managerial career
- 2007–2008: AJ Auxerre Under 13
- 2008–2009: AJ Auxerre Under 18
- 2009–: AJ Auxerre Under 15
- * Club domestic league appearances and goals

Jérémy Spender (born 13 April 1982) is a former French footballer who works as head coach for the U-15 team of Auxerre.

== Early life ==
Spender was born in Toulon and raised in Ollioules.

== Career ==
He began his career 1999 with Auxerre and was with them when Auxerre won the Coupe Gambardella in 2000. He retired in summer 2009.

== Coaching career ==
Spender was named as under-18 head coach for Auxerre, succeeding Gérald Baticle, who formerly coached the under-13 team. After his retirement in July 2009, he was named head coach of the U-15 team.

== Honours ==
- 2000: Coupe Gambardella
