= Jérémy Deichelbohrer =

French footballer (born 1986)

Personal information
- Full name: Jérémy Deichelbohrer
- Date of birth: 25 April 1986 (age 40)
- Place of birth: Belfort, France
- Height: 1.86 m (6 ft 1 in)
- Position: Goalkeeper

Team information
- Current team: UNA Strassen (Manager)

Youth career
- 1998–2001: SCM Valdoie
- 1998–2001: ASM Belfort
- 2001–2004: Sochaux

Senior career*
Years	Team	Apps	(Gls)
2004–2005	Sochaux II	41	(0)
2005–2007	Sochaux	0	(0)
2007–2009	Tours	2	(0)
2010	Dijon	0	(0)
2011	Amnéville		
2011	Romorantin		
2012	ASM Belfort		
2012	Pontivy		
2013	Concarneau		
2013–2018	Rumilly-Vallières		

Managerial career
- 2018–2019: Thionville
- 2019–2020: Portugais de Thionville
- 2020: Annecy-le-Vieux
- 2020–2022: Gazélec Ajaccio (assistant)
- 2022–2025: Villerupt-Thil
- 2025–2026: US Mondorf
- 2026–: UNA Strassen
- * Club domestic league appearances and goals

Jérémy Deichelbohrer (born 25 April 1986 in Belfort) is a retired French footballer and current manager of FC UNA Strassen in Luxembourg.

== Career ==
Deichelbohrer began his career 1998 in the youth side for ASM Belfort in the season 2001/2002 was scouted FC Sochaux-Montbeliard, here was promoted in 2005 to the Ligue 1 team. He played not one minute in the Ligue 1 in his two seasons for Sochaux and signed in July 2007 for Tours FC who earned his first eleven seniorcaps, including two in the Ligue 2. On 1 February 2010 Deichelbohrer signed a half-year contract with Dijon FCO, he comes on a free transfer from Tours FC. The former player of Tours and Sochaux will play there until the end of season.

After his spell at Dijon, Deichelbohrer had spells at Amnéville (2011), Romorantin (2011–12), ASM Belfort (2012 and Pontivy (2012–13), before joining US Concarneau in January 2013.

=== Later and managerial career ===
Later in 2013, Deichelbohrer joined French Régional 1 club ES Vallières, which later changed name to GFA Rumilly-Vallières. He played for the club until 2018 – five years.

In April 2018 it was confirmed, that Deichelbohrer would retire at the end of the season and become the new manager of Régional 1 club Thionville FC. He left the position in February 2019 and was instead hired as manager of Portugais de Thionville. In April 2020, he was appointed manager of Annecy-le-Vieux.

In June 2020, Deichelbohrer was appointed assistant manager of David Ducourtioux at Gazélec Ajaccio. The duo left the club at the end of May 2022. A month later, Deichelbohrer was appointed manager of ES Villerupt-Thil.

In May 2025, Deichelbohrer was appointed manager of Luxembourgish National Division side US Mondorf. A year later, in May 2026, Deichelbohrer was appointed manager of UNA Strassen, also of the National Division.

== Personal life ==
His father Gilles is a former footballer who played in the 1980s as a midfielder for ASM Belfort.
