= Jeremy Zerechak =

American filmmaker

- Born: 1979 (age 46–47); Scranton, Pennsylvania
- Occupation: Documentary filmmaker

Jeremy Zerechak (born 1979) is an American documentary filmmaker. He has directed and produced two feature-length documentaries, Land of Confusion (2008) and Code 2600 (2011).

== Background ==
Born in Scranton, Pennsylvania, Zerechak joined the Army National Guard after high school so he could afford to attend film school. He was enrolled at Pennsylvania State University when his unit was deployed to Iraq in 2004. While serving in Iraq, Zerechak filmed his first feature-length documentary, Land of Confusion, which chronicles his unit's mission in Iraq and the operations of the Iraq Survey Group. Zerechak graduated from Pennsylvania State University in 2006 with a Bachelor of Arts in Film and Video Production. He taught film at Ohio University.

== Work ==
In 2008, Zerechak produced and directed Land of Confusion. The film won two Special Jury Awards at the Florida Film Festival and the Atlanta Film Festival.

In 2011, Zerechak produced and directed Code 2600, a documentary about the rise of the Information Technology Age and the history of hacker culture. The film explores the impact of this new and growing connectivity on our human relations, personal privacy, and security as individuals and as a society. Code 2600 was selected for the Grand Jury Award for Best Documentary at the Atlanta Film Festival. In 2012, Zerechak produced and directed The Entrepreneur, a short documentary about American entrepreneur Ron Morris and his terminal battle with pancreatic cancer. In 2013, Zerechak traveled to Jinja, Uganda to film Hackers in Uganda. a documentary about a developing African community, its people, and the unique efforts of Hackers for Charity. The group was founded in 2009 by computer hacker and IT security expert Johnny Long, to provide humanitarian services in Uganda.

== Filmography ==
- 2008: Land of Confusion
- 2011: Code 2600
- 2012: The Entrepreneur (short)
- 2013: Town & Country (short)
- 2014: Hackers in Uganda (in production)
