= Pascal Pédemonte =

French footballer (born 1980)

Personal information
- Date of birth: 27 January 1980 (age 46)
- Place of birth: Lyon, France
- Height: 1.84 m (6 ft 0 in)
- Position: Defender

Team information
- Current team: AS Moulins

Youth career
- 1999–2001: Lyon

Senior career*
| Years | Team | Apps | (Gls) |
| 2000–2001 | Lyon (B team) | | |
| 2001–2003 | Sedan | 2 | (0) |
| 2003–2004 | Laval | 9 | (0) |
| 2004–2007 | Tours | 60 | (2) |
| 2007–2009 | Calais | 38 | (2) |
| 2009–2011 | AS Moulins | 19 | (1) |
| 2011– | AS Lyon Duchère | 8 | (1) |
- * Club domestic league appearances and goals as of 8 January 2012

Pascal Pédemonte (born 27 January 1980) is a French football (soccer) defender. Currently, he plays in the Championnat de France amateur for AS Lyon Duchère.
