= Christelle Lefranc =

French model

Christelle Lefranc (born March 15, 1980) is a fashion model from Paris, France. She is represented by The Fashion Model Management Next Model Management of Paris, London, England, New York City, and Miami, Florida, and Traffic of Madrid, Spain and Barcelona, Spain. Lefranc is 5 ft 10 in (178 cm), with blonde hair and blue eyes. Her hobbies include ballet.

She has modelled in advertising for Cartier, Fope, Guy Laroche, Harvey Nichols, Max Studio, Mimi, and Ralph Lauren. Her image has been captured on the covers of periodicals like Madame magazine Germany, D magazine Italy, Vogue Portugal, and The Face United Kingdom.
