= Eva Jare =

Finnish footballer (born 1947)

Eva Jare (born 6 July 1947) is a Finnish former women's footballer, who made 15 appearances for the Finland women's national football team. In her club career, she played for Lahti-69, Tampere, FC Ilves, and FC Kuusysi. In 2009, she won the Kaijan Kannu award.
