= Jaz Rabadia =

British engineer

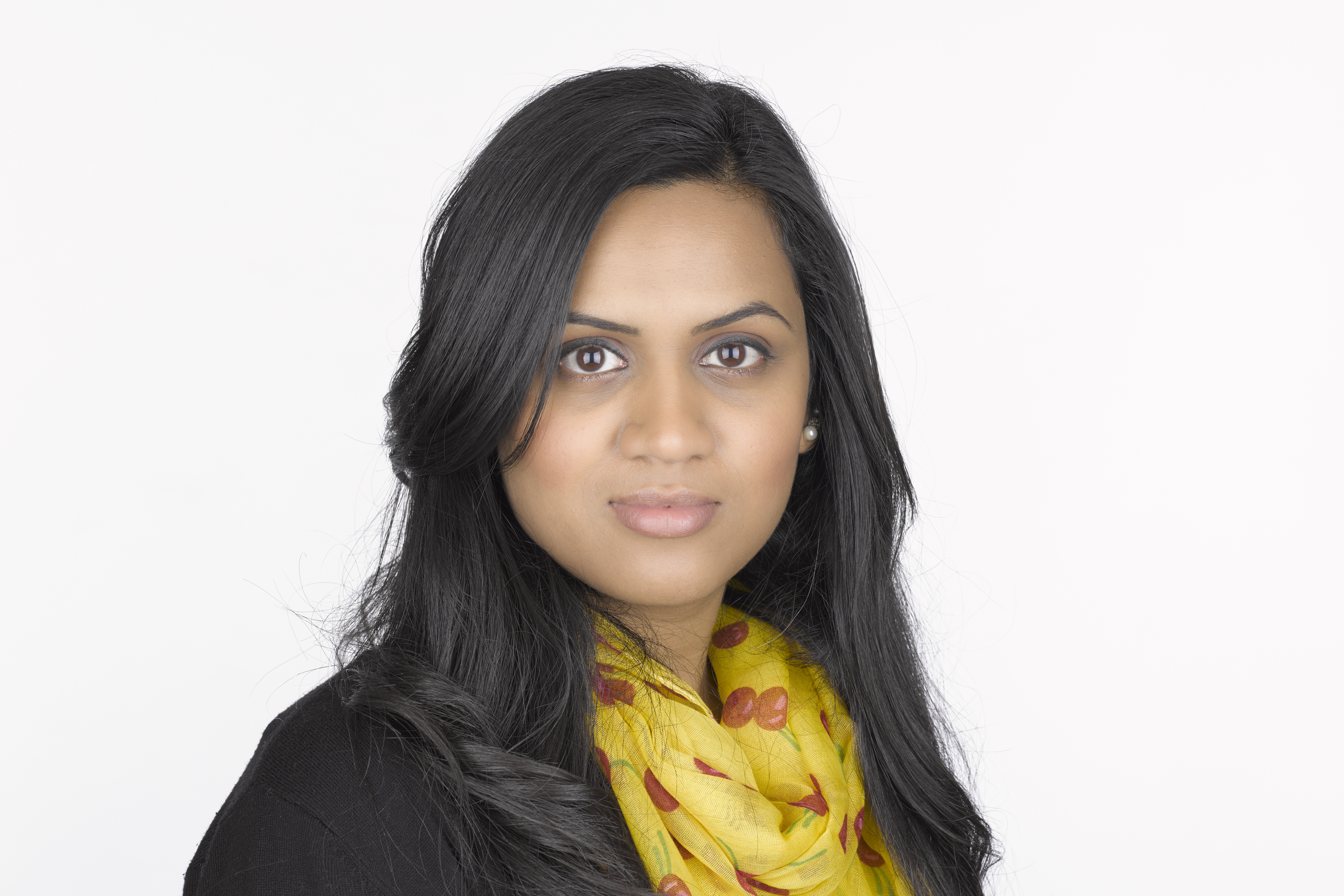
Jaz Rabadia MBE

Jaz Rabadia MBE is a British engineer, who was recognised in the Queens 2016 New Years Honours for services to Sustainability in the Energy Management sector and promoting diversity in STEM (Science, Technology, Engineering & Mathematics)

She was the youngest person in the UK to be awarded the Energy Institute's Chartered Energy Manager status and served on their Council.

Rabadia graduated from City, University of London with a degree in mechanical engineering

== Education ==
Rabadia completed an undergraduate BEng in Mechanical Engineering at City, University of London and continued on to complete a postgraduate MSc in Energy, Environment Technology & Economics.

She now features as a notable Alumni on the City University website.

== Career ==
Rabadia's interest in energy management began on a Sainsbury's checkout where she worked part-time whilst studying. As part of her final year dissertation she completed an energy study in the Hendon branch and then went on to join the head office energy team eventually becoming Sainsbury's Group Energy Manager . She moved to the retail fashion outlet Debenhams and after 2 years at Debenhams, moved to Starbucks as Senior Manager of Energy & Initiatives EMEA. She left Starbucks in September 2019 to join WeWork as their Director of Energy, Sustainability and Social Impact. Since Dec 2021, Rabadia has led responsible business and sustainability practices at Just Eat Takeaway.com/

Rabadia also serves as a Non Executive Director at 4imprint Group plc/

== Awards and honours ==
- 2023 - Distinguished STEM Alumni - City University, London - https://www.city.ac.uk/news-and-events/news/2023/08/jaz-rabadia-shares-special-recognition-award-in-the-category-of-excellence-in-stem-achievement
- 2015 – MBE - Member of the Order of the British Empire – for services to sustainability in the energy management sector and promoting diversity in the STEM sectors - https://www.asian-voice.com/News/UK/Queen-announces-New-Year%E2%80%99s-Honours-List-2016
- 2014 – Young Energy Professional Award – Energy Institute – Winner
- 2014 – Energy Buyer of the Year – Energy Awards - Winner
- 2012 - ESTA Energy Manager of the Year – Highly Commended
- 2012 - Asian Women of Achievement Awards – Young Achiever – Highly Commended
