= Julien Martinelli =

French footballer (born 1980)

Personal information
- Full name: Julien Martinelli
- Date of birth: 12 December 1980 (age 45)
- Place of birth: Schiltigheim, France
- Height: 1.91 m (6 ft 3 in)
- Position: Goalkeeper

Senior career*
Years	Team	Apps	(Gls)
1995–1998	Strasbourg	0	(0)
1998–2004	Chamois Niortais	3	(0)
2004–2005	Angoulême	21	(0)
2005–2006	Chamois Niortais	5	(0)
2006–2008	Angers	0	(0)
2008–2010	Bonchamp		
- * Club domestic league appearances and goals

Julien Martinelli (born 12 December 1980) is a French former professional footballer who played as a goalkeeper.

== Career ==
Martinelli made 3 appearances in Ligue 2 with Chamois Niortais.
