= Marc Giraudon =

French footballer (born 1980)

Personal information
- Full name: Marc Giraudon
- Date of birth: July 22, 1980 (age 46)
- Place of birth: Vierzon, Cher, France
- Height: 1.82 m (6 ft 0 in)
- Position: Left back

Senior career*
| Years | Team | Apps | (Gls) |
| 1998–2003 | Châteauroux | 75 | (0) |
| 2003 | Clermont Foot | 9 | (0) |
| 2003–2005 | Châteauroux | 36 | (0) |
| 2005–2009 | Reims | 110 | (0) |
| 2009–2011 | Châteauroux | | |
- * Club domestic league appearances and goals as of June 1, 2007

Marc Giraudon (born July 22, 1980) is a French football defender who played for several years in Ligue 2.

== Career ==
Giraudon played in 230 Ligue 2 matches over 11 seasons with LB Châteauroux, Clermont Foot and Stade Reims. Giraudon was a key part of Châteauroux's run to the 2003–04 Coupe de France final, however one week before the final he suffered an ankle injury and missed the match.
