= Jez (nickname) =

As a nickname, Jez most commonly is a diminutive form of the given name Jeremy (roughly homophonous to "Jers" in non-rhotic accents), Jezebel, Jeremiah, Jerahmeel, and Jezreel.

The Jez nickname can often be extended to form other nicknames, still based on the name Jezreel, such as Jezza or Jezzie. It may refer to:

== People with the nickname ==
- Jez Alborough (born 1959), English writer and illustrator
- Jez Butterworth (born 1969), English playwright, screenwriter and director
- Jez Coad, English record producer and musician
- Jez George (born 1970), English football manager and executive
- Jez Lowe (born 1955), English folk singer-songwriter
- Jez Moxey (born 1963), English football executive
- Jez Nelson, British jazz broadcaster and television producer
- Jez San (born 1966), English programmer
- Jez Strode (born 1958), English drummer
- Jez Williams (born 1970), English musician
- Jez Wilson (born 1979), English boxer

== Fictional characters with the nickname ==
- Jeremy Usborne, one of the main characters of the British TV series Peep Show
- Jessica Lockhart, a character in The Kingdom Keepers series of novels.
- Jezz Torrent, lead singer for the fictional band "Love Fist" in Grand Theft Auto: Vice City
- Jeremy "Jez" Brockhollow, a badger socialite in Dimension 20: Mice and Murder

== See also ==
- Jez (disambiguation)
- Jezza (disambiguation)
