= Jeremie (name) =

Jeremie is a given name and surname. Notable people with the name include:

== Given name ==
- Jeremie Berrebi (born 1978), French-Israeli entrepreneur and businessman
- Jeremie Dufault, American politician
- Jeremie Frimpong (born 2000), Dutch footballer
- Jeremie Harris, American actor
- Jeremie Miller, software developer

== Surname ==
- James Jeremie, literature and divinity professor
- John Jeremie (1795–1841), British judge and diplomat

== See also ==
- Jérémie (given name)
- Jeramie, given name
- Jeremi, given name
- Jeremy (given name)
