= Jaz (island) =

Islet of Croatia in the Adriatic Sea

Coordinates: 43°32′29″N 15°56′00″E

Location of Jaz in Croatia

Map

Jaz is small uninhabited island in the Adriatic Sea, Croatia.

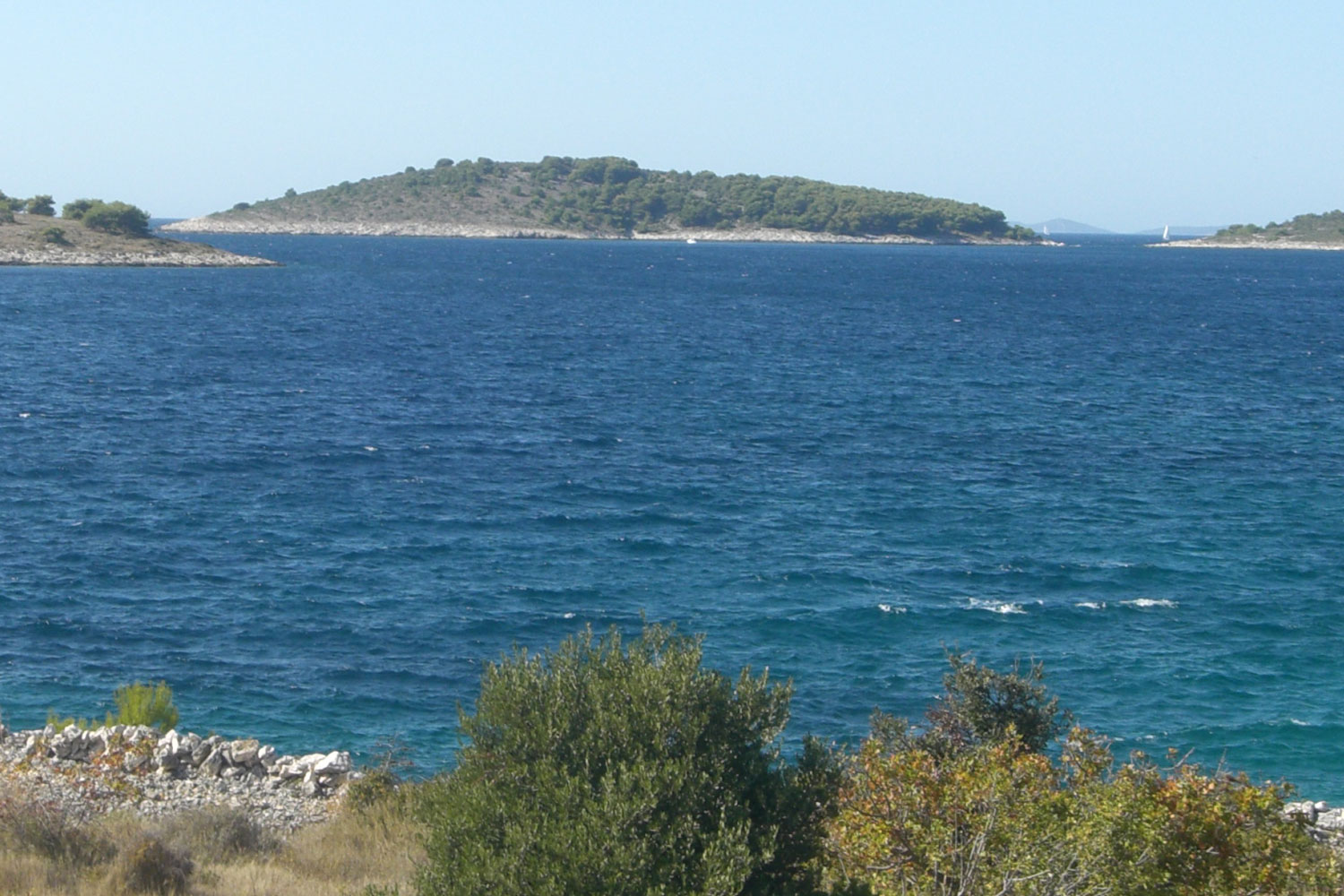
Jaz and proximity of coast in the right corner

Jaz is situated 55 m off the coast, halfway between towns of Primošten and Rogoznica. Its area is 0.137 km^{2} (0.053 sq mi). The highest peak of this island is approximately 44 m. It is famous for its proximity to the coast. This means visitors can swim over from the coast without the use of a boat, but with a towel in their hands.
