= Jean-Daniel Padovani =

French footballer (born 1980)

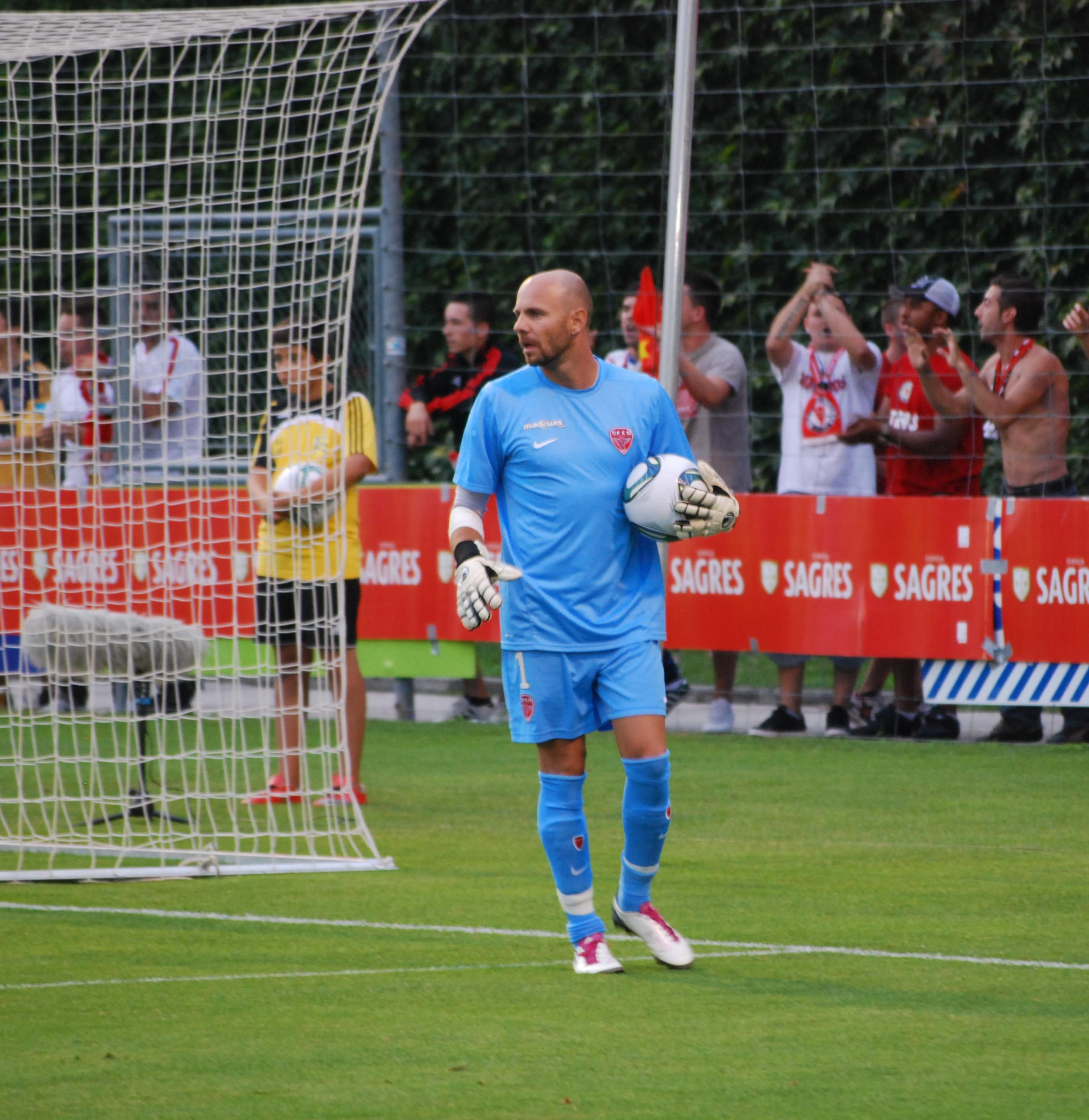

Personal information
- Full name: Jean-Daniel Padovani
- Date of birth: 17 January 1980 (age 46)
- Place of birth: Perpignan, France
- Height: 1.72 m (5 ft 7 1/2 in)
- Position: Goalkeeper

Senior career*
| Years | Team | Apps | (Gls) |
| 1997–2000 | Martigues | 90 | (1) |
| 2000–2003 | Nice | 28 | (0) |
| 2002–2003 | Rouen | 19 | (0) |
| 2003–2006 | Cannes | 84 | (0) |
| 2006–2010 | Angers | 131 | (0) |
| 2010–2012 | Dijon | 36 | (0) |
- * Club domestic league appearances and goals as of 10 October 2012

Jean-Daniel Padovani (born 17 January 1980) is a French former footballer who played as a goalkeeper.

At the end of the 2007–08 season, he received the " Etoile d'Or du meilleur gardien de Ligue 2" (Gold star for the best Ligue 2 goalkeeper) from the magazine France Football.

Padovani was part of the Comoros national football team coaching team during the 2021 Africa Cup of Nations. Padovani is part of the Mali national football team coaching team during the 2024 Africa Cup of Nations.
