= Dramane Diarra =

French basketball player (born 1980)

Dramane Diarra (born 19 November 1980 in Paris) is a French basketball player who played 27 games for French Pro A league club Reims during the 2006-2007 season.
