= Juzir, Hormozgan =

Juzir جوزير
- Village
- Location within Iran
- Coordinates: 27°48′29″N 57°16′34″E
- Country: Iran
- Province: Hormozgan
- County: Rudan
- Bakhsh: Rudkhaneh
- Rural District: Rudkhaneh Bar

Population (2006)
  - Total: 291
- Time zone: UTC+3:30 (IRST)
  - Summer (DST): UTC+4:30 (IRDT)

Juzir (Persian: جوزير, also Romanized as Jūzīr; also known as Jāz, Jowzān, and Jūzīn) is a village in Rudkhaneh Bar Rural District, Rudkhaneh District, Rudan County, Hormozgan Province, Iran. At the 2006 census, its population was 291, in 61 families.
