= Calcialiment =

French animal feed producer

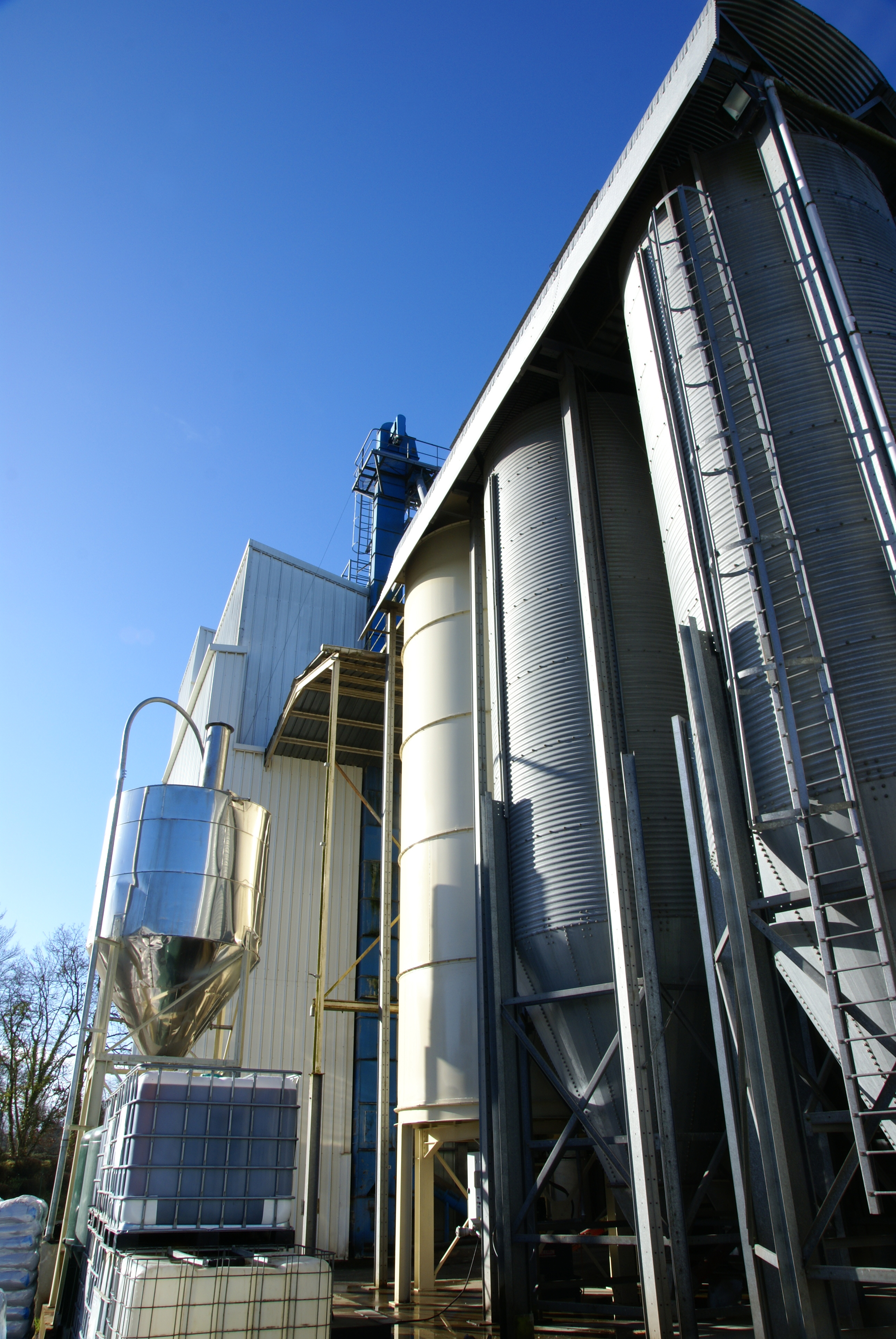
Calcialiment factory

Calcialiment Logo.jpg

Calcialiment is an animal feed producer based in Brittany which started as a family business during three generations and became part of Vitfoss and DLG, one of the biggest premix producers in Europe.

Although the origins of Calcialiment go back to a long process of industrial revolution, this was initially undertaken in family watchmaking, starting with the first generation of watchmakers represented by Théophile Joseph Lognoné, who was born on July 10, 1869, and died on February 4, 1920, at the age of 50. The reconversion of watchmaking micro-techniques made it possible to use crushers to develop new biotechnologies from marine products such as shellfish.

Vitfoss is a Danish company that specializes in the development and production of vitamin and mineral premixes for animal feed including for pigs, poultry, cattle, and aquaculture.

DLG (Dansk Landbrugs Grovvareselskab) is also a Danish company. DLG's main activities include the production and distribution of animal feed, crop protection products, seeds, fertilizers, energy products, and other agricultural inputs.

== Name and vision ==
Derived from the French words for calcium and feeding (alimentation), Calcialiment appears to be a brand name for a nutritional supplement used for livestock, particularly cows. It is designed to provide additional calcium and other nutrients to support the health and productivity of livestock.

== History ==
Calcialiment was founded in 1930 in Brittany. As a family business specialising in animal nutrition, the company developed around three core areas: minerals for producing livestock farmers, infancy feed, and premix for industrial farmers.

1900 : Théophile Joseph Lognoné represents the first generation of watchmakers, born July 10, 1869, and died February 4, 1920, at the age of 50.

1935: His son, Théophile Lognone, a watchmaker & jeweller in the Mont Saint-Michel Bay area, noticed that the eggs produced by his hens were stronger and hatched better when he gave them bits of shell to peck. His discovery earned him the first prize at the 1936 Ministry of Agriculture Competition.

1937: He set up a company that specialised in feed for laying hens.

1952: His sons Pierre and Xavier shifted the company's activity towards mineral feed for pigs and, in 1955, created the first Breton “Piétrain” breed pig farm.

Nowadays, Calcialiment expanded to operate at the national level and is managed by Yves Reneaume and François Lognone; the historical owner is the company president. The company employs 100 people, working at 4 production sites.

== DLG Group ==
Calcialiment-Vilofoss is owned partly by Vitfoss and by DLG, which is one of the biggest premix producers in Europe. The company is headquartered in Denmark and operates in many European countries through its subsidiaries and joint ventures, including in Germany, Poland and the United Kingdom In Scandinavia, DLG operates a network of agricultural retail stores, produces animal feed and provides advisory services to farmers.
