= Jeremy Kidd =

British-American artist and photographer

- Born: 1 April 1962 (age 64); London, England
- Education: De Montfort University
- Occupations: Contemporary artist Photographer
- Years active: 1987–present
- Style: Collage
- Spouses: Catherine Cederquist (m. 1991; div. 1992) Wijitra Pimros Kidd (m. 2014)

Jeremy Kidd (born 1 April 1962) is a British-born contemporary artist, who does paintings, sculptures, installation art, and photography. In the early eighties, when Kidd was in art school, he was given the assignment to photographically document a walk through a park using multiple shots to convey the scene. This and David Hockney's collages gave him the idea to manipulate digital photography via Photoshop in a similar way, but to take it one step further by blending and molding these shots together. Hence, he created Day through Night transitional works with uneven outlines that reflected the reassembly of many images, as seen in his piece Desert to Palm (2004), the first one of this series, which was inspired by the poem Ariel by Sylvia Plath and shown in a group exhibition “Crazy Thoughts Have Quick Wings” at Cirrus Gallery, curated by art critic Eve Wood. This new approach in photography was also presented in his one-person shows, including “Fictional Realities” at Laguna Art Museum, CA 2007, “Hyper Architectural Typologies” at UCR, the California Museum of Photography, University of California Riverside, CA, 2008 and “Fictional Realities” at Fahey Klein Gallery, CA.

In 1999 Jeremy Kidd was selected for the Orange County Museum Biennial curated by Bruce Guenther, which featured the works of ten artists, who explored the realm of function and form. Kidd's works have been exhibited and collected throughout the United States and internationally, including Great Britain, Germany, the Netherlands, Australia, Algeria, Panama, Hong Kong, Italy, and Dubai. Kidd lives and works in Venice Beach, Los Angeles.

== Biography ==
=== Education and formative years ===
==== Years in England ====
Kidd was born on 1 April 1, 1962 in London to a well known artistic family. He is the grandson of the English painter Ben Nicholson and English modernist sculptor Barbara Hepworth. His great grandfather is the painter Sir William Nicholson known for his still lives, landscapes, and portraits of the aristocracy. His great grandfather's lithographs of Queen Victoria and Otto von Bismarck or Prince of Bismarck, are in the print and drawing collection of Tate Britain. Kidd's mother is also a painter. His father, Michael Kidd, was a neuroscientist recognized internationally for his research in Alzheimer's disease. Kidd has two sisters. His sister Alison Kidd used to be a fashion designer and is currently working as an artist. His sister Julia Kidd is a writer.

At the age of six, Kidd moved from London to Bristol and then went to a boarding school in Dorset at age 12. In 1984, he received his bachelor's degree in Fine Arts & Sculpture from the De Montfort University in Leicester, England.

==== Years on the West Coast ====
In 1986, Kidd and his then girl-friend Alison Fisher came to New York and lived for two weeks in the Meatpacking District, Manhattan, before they headed towards Tucson, Arizona, via Auto Driveway, where they bought a van in which they traveled around the USA for a year. Kidd worked in migrant jobs, digging ditches and boxing mesquite trees in the Tucson desert for little money and under sometimes hottest weather conditions, alongside people with no social security cards. In 1987 he and Fisher arrived on the Westcoast. They first lived in Seattle, Washington, and then Portland, Oregon, and San Francisco, where they sold hand-painted art T-Shirts at craft fairs and galleries under the company name Fidget, Robin Williams being an early patron. Later they moved to the famed Topanga Canyon Ranch Hotel in Los Angeles where they sold their designer T-Shirts to upscale stores on Rodeo Drive in Beverly Hills to the movie stars of the time, such as by Silvester Stallone, Steve Martin, Chevy Chase, etc. Kidd is also a surfer and surfed both in Topanga State Beach and Malibu Third Point. In 1991 he married Chevy Chase's half-sister, Catherine Cederquist, and a year later they were divorced. Kidd remarried on 3 September 2014 in Santa Barbara. His wife is Wijitra Pimros Kidd. The two met in Thailand.

== Work ==
Kidd composes an image from multiple perspectives. In order to get his desired image, he often takes hundreds of digital photographs with a wide-angle lens of either landscape or cityscape scenes at different times of day and night to get a range of lighting conditions and weather shifts and then stitches them together in Photoshop to create a single composition that seems more representative of the time and place. This can take several months to up to a year. According to Kidd, it seems unrealistic to expect a single photographic shot, a single moment in time, to convey the human experience of seeing for he believes we visually explore our environment in the third and fourth dimensions as we build our personal visual journey.

With his training as a sculptor, Kidd also often integrates the three – dimensional with photography. Two of his public works, including Desert Blade 1 (2017) and Hercules 1 (2017) are currently on view in the biannual outdoor project commissioned by Agensys Inc., installed at the company's headquarters adjacent to Bergamot (arts center) in Santa Monica CA, in which aerodynamic forms were wrapped around images that derived from the landscape they originated from.

Among his recent works are Ruby City Swing (2019) and Saddleback Sublime (2019), in which sublime images come alive through animation, sound design, and music. The videos were first shown during the Venice Biennale 2019 in Italy as part of the project “Alive in the Universe” founded and launched by Caroline Wiseman that involved 28 Big Bang artists who presented videos, performance art, and art installations over 28 days.
