= Jérémy Pinvidic =

French footballer (born 1987)

Personal information
- Date of birth: March 6, 1987 (age 39)
- Place of birth: Brest, France
- Height: 1.87 m (6 ft 1 1/2 in)
- Position: Midfielder

Team information
- Current team: Stade Plabennec

Senior career*
Years	Team	Apps	(Gls)
2004–2005	Lorient (B team)		
2005–2006	Stade Plabennec		
2006–2007	Lorient (B team)		
2007–2009	Stade Brestois	6	(0)
2009–	Stade Plabennec	151	(25)
- * Club domestic league appearances and goals as of 07:35, 3 July 2015 (UTC)

Jérémy Pinvidic (born March 6, 1987) is a French professional football player who plays in the Championnat National 3 for Stade Plabennécois.

He played on the professional level in Ligue 2 for Stade Brestois 29.
