= Jérémy Moreau =

French footballer (born 1980)

Personal information
- Date of birth: 22 July 1980 (age 46)
- Place of birth: Bourges, France
- Height: 1.94 m (6 ft 4 in)
- Position: Goalkeeper

Team information
- Current team: US Colomiers

Youth career
- FC Bourges

Senior career*
Years	Team	Apps	(Gls)
2002–2004	Toulouse FC	4	(0)
2004–2005	FC Rouen	37	(0)
2005–2010	OGC Nice	1	(0)
2005–2010	Orléans	12	(0)
2005–2010	US Colomiers	31	(0)
- * Club domestic league appearances and goals as of 02:39, 20 August 2016 (UTC)

Jérémy Moreau (born 22 July 1980 in Bourges) is a French professional footballer currently playing for French club US Colomiers.
