= Dansk Landbrugs Grovvareselskab =

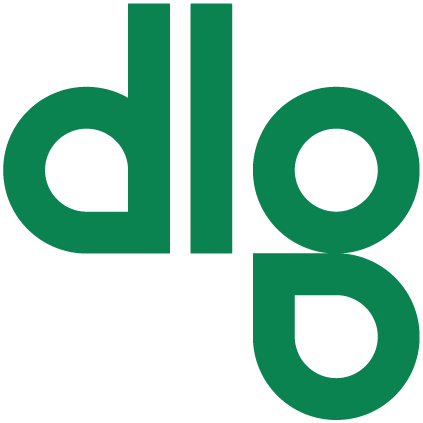
- Headquarters: Fredericia
- Key people: Chairman of the Board - Carl Christian Lei, CEO - Peter Giørtz-Carlsen, COO - Kevin Lorenzen, CFO - Morten Riber Pryds
- Revenue: DKK 61,8 Bn (EUR 8,27 Bn) (2025)
- Number of employees: 6,663 (2025)
- Website: DLG

Dansk Landbrugs Grovvareselskab ("Danish Agricultural Grocery Company"), officially DLG, is a Danish co-operative company owned by Danish farmers. The business is divided in four business groups, Agriculture, Animal Nutrition, Energy and Housing. DLG’s principal markets are Denmark, Germany and Sweden, but export across Europe, the Middle East, Africa and South America also constitutes a large part of the business. The exports comprise malting barley, feed grain and bread grain, rapeseed and rapeseed oil.

The total annual export of crops reaches about DKK 5 billion. Furthermore, DLG runs the retail chain "Land & Fritid" selling products for house and garden. The DLG Group has 40 subsidiaries in 18 countries.

In 2014 the Group turnover reached more than DKK 49,1 billion (EUR 6,55 billion or USD 8,21 billion). The Group employs 6,663 people (as of 2025). DLG’s full name is Dansk Landbrugs Grovvareselskab a.m.b.a. and the co-operative was formed in 1969 by the merger of Jysk Andels Foderstofforretning (JAF, established in 1898), Øernes Andelsselskab for Indkøb af Foderstoffer (ØA, established in 1901) and Dansk Andels-Gødningsforretning (DAG, established in 1901).

In 1994 DLG acquired Superfos Grovvarer, in 1999 Fyens Andels-Foderstofforretning (FAF), in 2002 parts of KFK, in 2003 Bornholms Andels Foderstofforretning (BAF), and 2010 parts of Aarhus Egnens Andel. In 2007 DLG acquired two new subsidiaries, Kongskilde Industries A/S and the German farm supply company HaGe. In 2013 the German Team AG also entered the group of DLG subsidiaries. The DLG headquarters in Copenhagen was sold in 2017 and DLG has its main office in Fredericia from 2020. In 2017, DLG sold Kongskilde Industries A/S to Green Park Partners (UK).

Group CEO Kristian Hundebøll has been replaced by Peter Giørtz-Carlsen (former Executive Vice President of Arla Foods’ European business) in November 2024.
