= Football at the 2024 Summer Olympics – Men's tournament – Group D =

Group D of the men's football tournament at the 2024 Summer Olympics was played from 24 to 30 July 2024. The group consisted of Israel, Japan, Mali and Paraguay. The top two teams, Japan and Paraguay, advanced to the knockout stage.

== Teams ==
| Draw position | Team | Pot | Confederation | Method of qualification | Date of qualification | Olympic appearance | Last appearance | Previous best performance |
|---|---|---|---|---|---|---|---|---|
| D1 | Japan (Note: The qualifiers from AFC were not known at the time of the draw.) | 1 | AFC | 2024 AFC U-23 Asian Cup top three | 29 April 2024 | 12th | 2020 | Bronze medalists (1968) |
| D2 | Paraguay | 2 | CONMEBOL | 2024 CONMEBOL Pre-Olympic Tournament top two | 11 February 2024 | 3rd | 2004 | Silver medalists (2004) |
| D3 | Mali | 3 | CAF | 2023 U-23 Africa Cup of Nations top three | 7 July 2023 | 2nd | 2004 | Fifth place (2004) |
| D4 | Israel | 4 | UEFA | 2023 UEFA European Under-21 Championship top three | 2 July 2023 | 3rd | 1976 | Fifth place (1968) |

== Standings ==
| Pos | Team | Pld | W | D | L | GF | GA | GD | Pts | Qualification |
|---|---|---|---|---|---|---|---|---|---|---|
| 1 | Japan | 3 | 3 | 0 | 0 | 7 | 0 | +7 | 9 | Advance to knockout stage |
| 2 | Paraguay | 3 | 2 | 0 | 1 | 5 | 7 | −2 | 6 | Advance to knockout stage |
| 3 | Mali | 3 | 0 | 1 | 2 | 1 | 3 | −2 | 1 | |
| 4 | Israel | 3 | 0 | 1 | 2 | 3 | 6 | −3 | 1 | |

Source: FIFA
Rules for classification: Group stage tiebreakers

In the quarter-finals:

- The winners of Group D, Japan, advance to play the runners-up of Group C, Spain.
- The runners-up of Group D, Paraguay, advance to play the winners of Group C, Egypt.

== Matches ==
=== Japan vs Paraguay ===
24 July 2024
19:00

| Japan | 5–0 | Paraguay |
|---|---|---|
| Mito 18', 63'; Yamamoto 69'; Fujio 81', 87' | Report |

Stade de Bordeaux, Bordeaux
Attendance: 14,000
Referee: François Letexier (France)

| Japan | Paraguay |

| GK | 1 | Leo Kokubo |
| RB | 4 | Hiroki Sekine | (yellow card) 57' |
| CB | 5 | Seiji Kimura |
| CB | 15 | Kota Takai | (yellow card) 50' |
| LB | 16 | Ayumu Ohata | | (substituted off) 81' |
| CM | 7 | Rihito Yamamoto | | (substituted off) 73' |
| CM | 8 | Joel Chima Fujita (c) |
| RW | 14 | Shunsuke Mito | | (substituted off) 73' |
| AM | 10 | Koki Saito | | (substituted off) 73' |
| LW | 17 | Yu Hirakawa | | (substituted off) 35' |
| CF | 11 | Mao Hosoya |
Substitutes:
| GK | 12 | Taishi B. Nozawa |
| DF | 2 | Kaito Suzuki |
| DF | 3 | Ryūya Nishio | | (substituted on) 81' |
| MF | 6 | Sota Kawasaki | | (substituted on) 73' |
| MF | 13 | Ryotaro Araki | | (substituted on) 73' |
| FW | 9 | Shōta Fujio | | (substituted on) 73' |
| FW | 18 | Kein Sato | | (substituted on) 35' |
Manager:
Gō Ōiwa

| GK | 1 | Gatito Fernández |
| CB | 14 | Fabián Balbuena |
| CB | 3 | Ronaldo De Jesús | (yellow card) 80' |
| CB | 5 | Gilberto Flores |
| RM | 10 | Wílder Viera | (red card) 25' |
| CM | 8 | Diego Gómez (c) | | (substituted off) 82' |
| CM | 6 | Marcos Gómez |
| LM | 4 | Daniel Rivas | | (substituted off) 82' |
| RF | 17 | Gustavo Caballero | | (substituted off) 62' |
| CF | 7 | Marcelo Fernández | (yellow card) 8' | (substituted off) 62' |
| LF | 15 | Julio Enciso | | (substituted off) 74' |
Substitutes:
| GK | 12 | Rodrigo Frutos |
| DF | 2 | Alan Núñez | | (substituted on) 74' |
| DF | 13 | Alexis Cantero | | (substituted on) 82' |
| DF | 16 | Fernando Román |
| FW | 9 | Kevin Parzajuk | | (substituted on) 62' |
| FW | 11 | Enso González | (yellow card) 90+5' | (substituted on) 82' |
| FW | 18 | Marcelo Pérez | | (substituted on) 62' |
Manager:
Carlos Jara Saguier

Assistant referees:
Cyril Mugnier (France)
Mehdi Rahmouni (France)
Fourth official:
Jelena Cvetković (Serbia)
Video assistant referee:
Jérôme Brisard (France)
Assistant video assistant referee:
David Coote (Great Britain)

=== Mali vs Israel ===
24 July 2024
21:00

| Mali | 1–1 | Israel |
|---|---|---|
| Doumbia 63' | Report | H. Diallo 56' (o.g.) |

Parc des Princes, Paris
Attendance: 26,305
Referee: Campbell-Kirk Kawana-Waugh (New Zealand)

| Mali | Israel |

| GK | 1 | Lassine Diarra |
| RB | 17 | Ahmed Diomandé | (yellow card) 90+1' |
| CB | 4 | Mamadou Tounkara |
| CB | 3 | Hamidou Diallo |
| LB | 2 | Fodé Doucouré |
| RM | 8 | Boubacar Traoré (c) |
| CM | 18 | Moussa Diakité |
| CM | 13 | Brahima Diarra | | (substituted off) 74' |
| LM | 11 | Thiemoko Diarra |
| CF | 10 | Salam Jiddou | | (substituted off) 74' |
| CF | 9 | Cheickna Doumbia |
Substitutes:
| GK | 16 | Oumar Coulibaly |
| DF | 5 | Ibrahima Cissé |
| DF | 15 | Mohamed Cisset |
| MF | 6 | Coli Saco | | (substituted on) 74' |
| MF | 12 | Issouf Sissokho |
| FW | 7 | Wilson Samaké |
| FW | 14 | Demba Diallo | | (substituted on) 74' |
Manager:
Alou Badra Diallo

| GK | 1 | Omer Nir'on |
| RB | 12 | Noam Ben Harush |
| CB | 2 | Ilay Feingold |
| CB | 4 | Stav Lemkin |
| LB | 3 | Sean Goldberg |
| RM | 11 | Liel Abada | (substituted off) 67' |
| CM | 6 | Omri Gandelman (c) |
| CM | 14 | Ayano Preda | (substituted off) 46' |
| LM | 10 | Oscar Gloukh | (substituted off) 82' |
| CF | 13 | Elad Madmon | (substituted off) 46' |
| CF | 9 | Dor Turgeman |
Substitutes:
| GK | 18 | Niv Eliasi |
| GK | 22 | Roy Sason |
| DF | 7 | Osher Davida | (substituted on) 67' |
| DF | 16 | Or Israelov |
| MF | 8 | Ethan Azoulay | (substituted on) 46' |
| MF | 15 | Adi Yona | (substituted on) 82' |
| MF | 17 | Ido Shahar | (substituted on) 46' |
Manager:
Guy Luzon

Assistant referees:
Isaac Trevis (New Zealand)
Bernard Mutukera (Solomon Islands)
Fourth official:
Saíd Martínez (Honduras)
Video assistant referee:
Leodán González (Uruguay)
Assistant video assistant referee:
Daiane Muniz (Brazil)

=== Israel vs Paraguay ===
27 July 2024
19:00

| Israel | 2–4 | Paraguay |
|---|---|---|
| Gandelman 53'; Gloukh 80' | Report | M. Fernández 25', 90+6'; Enciso 69'; Balbuena 90+3' |

Parc des Princes, Paris
Attendance: 28,887
Referee: Drew Fischer (Canada)

| Israel | Paraguay |

| GK | 1 | Omer Nir'on |
| RB | 12 | Noam Ben Harush |
| CB | 4 | Stav Lemkin | | (substituted off) 90+10' |
| CB | 3 | Sean Goldberg |
| LB | 2 | Ilay Feingold |
| RM | 8 | Ethan Azoulay | (yellow card) 81' |
| CM | 6 | Omri Gandelman (c) |
| CM | 10 | Oscar Gloukh |
| LM | 17 | Ido Shahar | | (substituted off) 72' |
| CF | 9 | Dor Turgeman | | (substituted off) 72' |
| CF | 11 | Liel Abada | | (substituted off) 85' |
Substitutes:
| GK | 18 | Niv Eliasi |
| DF | 7 | Osher Davida | | (substituted on) 85' |
| DF | 16 | Or Israelov | | (substituted on) 90+10' |
| MF | 14 | Ayano Preda |
| MF | 15 | Adi Yona | | (substituted on) 72' |
| FW | 13 | Elad Madmon | | (substituted on) 72' |
Manager:
Guy Luzon

| GK | 1 | Gatito Fernández |
| RB | 2 | Alan Núñez |
| CB | 14 | Fabián Balbuena |
| CB | 3 | Ronaldo De Jesús |
| LB | 4 | Daniel Rivas |
| RM | 18 | Marcelo Pérez | | (substituted off) 90+9' |
| CM | 8 | Diego Gómez (c) |
| CM | 6 | Marcos Gómez |
| LM | 11 | Enso González | | (substituted off) 14' |
| CF | 15 | Julio Enciso |
| CF | 7 | Marcelo Fernández | | (substituted off) 90+9' |
Substitutes:
| GK | 12 | Rodrigo Frutos |
| DF | 5 | Gilberto Flores | | (substituted on) 90+9' |
| DF | 13 | Alexis Cantero |
| DF | 16 | Fernando Román | | (substituted on) 90+9' |
| FW | 9 | Kevin Parzajuk | | (substituted on) 90+1' |
| FW | 17 | Gustavo Caballero | (yellow card) 45+1' | (substituted on) 14' (substituted off) 90+1' |
Manager:
Carlos Jara Saguier

Assistant referees:
Micheal Barwegen (Canada)
Lyes Arfa (Canada)
Fourth official:
Ramon Abatti (Brazil)
Video assistant referee:
Ivan Bebek (Croatia)
Assistant video assistant referee:
Rodrigo Carvajal (Chile)

=== Japan vs Mali ===
27 July 2024
21:00

| Japan | 1–0 | Mali |
|---|---|---|
| Yamamoto 82' | Report |

Stade de Bordeaux, Bordeaux
Attendance: 9,893
Referee: Edina Alves Batista (Brazil)

| Japan | Mali |

| GK | 1 | Leo Kokubo |
| RB | 4 | Hiroki Sekine |
| CB | 15 | Kota Takai |
| CB | 3 | Ryūya Nishio | (yellow card) 45+1' |
| LB | 16 | Ayumu Ohata |
| DM | 8 | Joel Chima Fujita (c) | (yellow card) 28' |
| CM | 7 | Rihito Yamamoto | | (substituted off) 89' |
| CM | 13 | Ryotaro Araki | | (substituted off) 57' |
| RF | 20 | Fuki Yamada | | (substituted off) 69' |
| CF | 11 | Mao Hosoya |
| LF | 10 | Koki Saito | | (substituted off) 57' |
Substitutes:
| GK | 12 | Taishi B. Nozawa |
| DF | 5 | Seiji Kimura |
| DF | 21 | Takashi Uchino |
| MF | 6 | Sota Kawasaki | | (substituted on) 89' |
| MF | 14 | Shunsuke Mito | | (substituted on) 57' |
| FW | 9 | Shōta Fujio | | (substituted on) 57' |
| FW | 18 | Kein Sato | | (substituted on) 69' |
Manager:
Gō Ōiwa

| GK | 1 | Lassine Diarra |
| RB | 17 | Ahmed Diomandé |
| CB | 4 | Mamadou Tounkara |
| CB | 5 | Ibrahima Cissé |
| LB | 2 | Fodé Doucouré |
| DM | 18 | Moussa Diakité |
| CM | 10 | Salam Jiddou | (yellow card) 55' | (substituted off) 70' |
| CM | 8 | Boubacar Traoré (c) |
| RF | 13 | Brahima Diarra | | (substituted off) 77' |
| CF | 9 | Cheickna Doumbia |
| LF | 11 | Thiemoko Diarra |
Substitutes:
| GK | 16 | Oumar Coulibaly |
| DF | 3 | Hamidou Diallo |
| DF | 15 | Mohamed Cisset |
| MF | 6 | Coli Saco |
| MF | 12 | Issouf Sissokho | | (substituted on) 70' |
| FW | 7 | Wilson Samaké |
| FW | 14 | Demba Diallo | | (substituted on) 77' |
Manager:
Alou Badra Diallo

Assistant referees:
Neuza Back (Brazil)
Fabrini Bevilaqua (Brazil)
Fourth official:
Jelena Cvetković (Serbia)
Video assistant referee:
Daiane Muniz (Brazil)
Assistant video assistant referee:
Héctor Paletta (Argentina)

=== Israel vs Japan ===
30 July 2024
21:00

| Israel | 0–1 | Japan |
|---|---|---|
| | Report | Hosoya 90+1' |

Stade de la Beaujoire, Nantes
Attendance: 11,671
Referee: Saíd Martínez (Honduras)

| Israel | Japan |

| GK | 1 | Omer Nir'on |
| RB | 5 | Roy Revivo |
| CB | 4 | Stav Lemkin |
| CB | 3 | Sean Goldberg |
| LB | 2 | Ilay Feingold | (yellow card) 72' |
| RM | 8 | Ethan Azoulay | | (substituted off) 69' |
| CM | 6 | Omri Gandelman (c) | | (substituted off) 84' |
| CM | 17 | Ido Shahar | (yellow card) 16' | (substituted off) 46' |
| LM | 10 | Oscar Gloukh |
| CF | 13 | Elad Madmon | | (substituted off) 46' |
| CF | 11 | Liel Abada |
Substitutes:
| GK | 18 | Niv Eliasi |
| DF | 7 | Osher Davida | | (substituted on) 84' |
| DF | 12 | Noam Ben Harush |
| DF | 16 | Or Israelov |
| MF | 14 | Ayano Preda | | (substituted on) 46' |
| MF | 15 | Adi Yona | | (substituted on) 69' |
| FW | 9 | Dor Turgeman | | (substituted on) 46' |
Manager:
Guy Luzon

| GK | 1 | Leo Kokubo |
| RB | 21 | Takashi Uchino |
| CB | 2 | Kaito Suzuki |
| CB | 3 | Ryūya Nishio |
| LB | 5 | Seiji Kimura |
| RM | 20 | Fuki Yamada | (substituted off) 61' |
| CM | 7 | Rihito Yamamoto (c) | (substituted off) 46' |
| CM | 6 | Sota Kawasaki | (substituted off) 79' |
| LM | 13 | Ryotaro Araki | (substituted off) 79' |
| CF | 18 | Kein Sato |
| CF | 9 | Shōta Fujio |
Substitutes:
| GK | 12 | Taishi B. Nozawa |
| DF | 4 | Hiroki Sekine |
| DF | 15 | Kota Takai |
| MF | 8 | Joel Chima Fujita | (substituted on) 79' |
| MF | 14 | Shunsuke Mito | (substituted on) 61' |
| FW | 11 | Mao Hosoya | (substituted on) 79' |
| FW | 19 | Asahi Uenaka | (substituted on) 46' |
Manager:
Gō Ōiwa

Assistant referees:
Walter López (Honduras)
Christian Ramírez (Honduras)
Fourth official:
Odette Hamilton (Jamaica)
Video assistant referee:
David Coote (Great Britain)
Assistant video assistant referee:
Ovidiu Hațegan (Romania)

=== Paraguay vs Mali ===
30 July 2024
21:00

| Paraguay | 1–0 | Mali |
|---|---|---|
| M. Fernández 5' | Report |

Parc des Princes, Paris
Attendance: 35,736
Referee: Ilgiz Tantashev (Uzbekistan)

| Paraguay | Mali |

| GK | 1 | Gatito Fernández | (yellow card) 90+11' |
| RB | 2 | Alan Núñez |
| CB | 14 | Fabián Balbuena |
| CB | 3 | Ronaldo De Jesús |
| LB | 4 | Daniel Rivas |
| RM | 7 | Marcelo Fernández | (yellow card) 58' | (substituted off) 88' |
| CM | 6 | Marcos Gómez | | (substituted off) 70' |
| CM | 8 | Diego Gómez (c) | (yellow card) 45+7' | (substituted off) 88' |
| LM | 13 | Alexis Cantero |
| CF | 18 | Marcelo Pérez | (yellow card) 38' |
| CF | 15 | Julio Enciso | | (substituted off) 82' |
Substitutes:
| GK | 12 | Rodrigo Frutos |
| DF | 5 | Gilberto Flores | | (substituted on) 82' |
| DF | 16 | Fernando Román |
| MF | 20 | Ángel Cardozo Lucena | (yellow card) 71' | (substituted on) 70' |
| FW | 9 | Kevin Parzajuk | | (substituted on) 88' |
| FW | 17 | Gustavo Caballero | (yellow card) 90+12' | (substituted on) 88' |
Manager:
Carlos Jara Saguier

| GK | 1 | Lassine Diarra |
| RB | 17 | Ahmed Diomandé |
| CB | 5 | Ibrahima Cissé | (yellow card) 90+8' |
| CB | 4 | Mamadou Tounkara |
| LB | 2 | Fodé Doucouré | (yellow card) 90+12' |
| DM | 18 | Moussa Diakité | | (substituted off) 78' |
| CM | 10 | Salam Jiddou | | (substituted off) 46' |
| CM | 8 | Boubacar Traoré (c) |
| RF | 6 | Coli Saco |
| CF | 9 | Cheickna Doumbia | (yellow card) 90+8' |
| LF | 11 | Thiemoko Diarra | | (substituted off) 32' |
Substitutes:
| GK | 16 | Oumar Coulibaly |
| DF | 3 | Hamidou Diallo |
| DF | 15 | Mohamed Cisset |
| MF | 12 | Issouf Sissokho |
| MF | 13 | Brahima Diarra | | (substituted on) 32' |
| FW | 7 | Wilson Samaké | | (substituted on) 46' |
| FW | 14 | Demba Diallo | | (substituted on) 78' |
Manager:
Alou Badra Diallo

Assistant referees:
Andrey Tsapenko (Uzbekistan)
Timur Gaynullin (Uzbekistan)
Fourth official:
Glenn Nyberg (Sweden)
Video assistant referee:
Jérôme Brisard (France)
Assistant video assistant referee:
Khamis Al-Marri (Qatar)

== Discipline ==
Fair play points would have been used as a tiebreaker if the overall and head-to-head records of teams were tied. These were calculated based on yellow and red cards received in all group matches as follows:

- first yellow card: minus 1 point;
- indirect red card (second yellow card): minus 3 points;
- direct red card: minus 4 points;
- yellow card and direct red card: minus 5 points;

Only one of the above deductions could be applied to a player in a single match.

| Team | Match 1 | | | | Match 2 | | | | Match 3 | | | | Points |
| Team | Booked | (yellow card) (yellow-red card) | Sent off (straight red) | (yellow card) (red card) | Booked | (yellow card) (yellow-red card) | Sent off (straight red) | (yellow card) (red card) | Booked | (yellow card) (yellow-red card) | Sent off (straight red) | (yellow card) (red card) | Points |
|---|---|---|---|---|---|---|---|---|---|---|---|---|---|
| Israel | | | | | 1 | | | | 2 | | | | –3 |
| Japan | 2 | | | | 2 | | | | | | | | –4 |
| Mali | 1 | | | | 1 | | | | 3 | | | | –5 |
| Paraguay | 2 | | 1 | | 1 | | | | 6 | | | | –13 |
