= Football at the 2024 Summer Olympics – Men's tournament – Knockout stage =

The knockout stage of the men's football tournament at the 2024 Summer Olympics was played from 2 to 9 August 2024. The top two teams from each group in the group stage qualified for the knockout stage.

== Format ==
In the knockout stage, if a match was level at the end of 90 minutes of normal playing time, extra time was played (two periods of 15 minutes each) and followed, if necessary, by a penalty shoot-out to determine the winner.

== Qualified teams ==
The top two placed teams from each of the four groups qualified for the knockout stage.

Group	Winners	Runners-up
A	France	United States
B	Morocco	Argentina
C	Egypt	Spain
D	Japan	Paraguay

== Bracket ==
Quarter-finals
2 August – Bordeaux
France	1
Argentina	0
2 August – Marseille
Egypt (p)	1 (5)
Paraguay	1 (4)
2 August – Paris
Morocco	4
United States	0
2 August – Décines-Charpieu
Japan	0
Spain	3

Semi-finals
5 August – Décines-Charpieu
France (a.e.t.)	3
Egypt	1
5 August – Marseille
Morocco	1
Spain	2

Gold medal match
9 August – Paris
France	3
Spain (a.e.t.)	5
Bronze medal match
8 August – Nantes
Egypt	0
Morocco	6

== Quarter-finals ==
=== Morocco vs United States ===
2 August 2024
15:00

Morocco	4–0	United States
Rahimi 29' (pen.); Akhomach 63'; Hakimi 70'; Maouhoub 90+1' (pen.)	Report

Parc des Princes, Paris
Attendance: 42,868
Referee: Yael Falcón (Argentina)

Morocco	United States

GK	1	Munir Mohamedi
RB	2	Achraf Hakimi (c)
CB	17	Oussama El Azzouzi
CB	14	Oussama Targhalline		(substituted off) 81'
LB	11	Zakaria El Ouahdi
DM	4	Mehdi Boukamir
RM	10	Ilias Akhomach		(substituted off) 90+3'
CM	18	Amir Richardson		(substituted off) 80'
LM	16	Abde Ezzalzouli		(substituted off) 73'
CF	8	Bilal El Khannous	(yellow card) 57'
CF	9	Soufiane Rahimi		(substituted off) 80'
Substitutes:
GK	12	Rachid Ghanimi
DF	3	Akram Nakach		(substituted on) 90+3'
DF	5	Adil Tahif
MF	6	Benjamin Bouchouari		(substituted on) 80'
MF	13	Yassine Kechta		(substituted on) 81'
FW	7	Eliesse Ben Seghir		(substituted on) 73'
FW	15	El Mehdi Maouhoub		(substituted on) 80'
Manager:
Tarik Sektioui

GK	1	Patrick Schulte
RB	2	Nathan Harriel
CB	3	Walker Zimmerman
CB	12	Miles Robinson
LB	5	John Tolkin		(substituted off) 80'
DM	8	Tanner Tessmann (c)
CM	16	Jack McGlynn	(yellow card) 15'	(substituted off) 71'
CM	14	Djordje Mihailovic		(substituted off) 66'
RF	7	Kevin Paredes
CF	11	Paxten Aaronson	(yellow card) 75'	(substituted off) 80'
LF	9	Griffin Yow		(substituted off) 66'
Substitutes:
GK	18	Gabriel Slonina
DF	4	Maximilian Dietz
DF	17	Caleb Wiley		(substituted on) 80'
MF	15	Benjamin Cremaschi		(substituted on) 80'
MF	21	Josh Atencio		(substituted on) 71'
FW	10	Taylor Booth		(substituted on) 66'
FW	13	Duncan McGuire		(substituted on) 66'
Manager:
(Serbia) Marko Mitrović

Assistant referees:
Maximiliano Del Yesso (Argentina)
Facundo Rodríguez (Argentina)
Fourth official:
Campbell-Kirk Kawana-Waugh (New Zealand)
Reserve assistant referee:
Isaac Trevis (New Zealand)
Video assistant referee:
Rob Dieperink (Netherlands)
Assistant video assistant referees:
Carlos del Cerro Grande (Spain)
Sivakorn Pu-udom (Thailand)

=== Japan vs Spain ===
2 August 2024
17:00

Japan	0–3	Spain
	Report	López 11', 73'; Ruiz 86'

Stade de Lyon, Décines-Charpieu
Attendance: 19,111
Referee: Dahane Beida (Mauritania)

Japan	Spain

GK	1	Leo Kokubo
RB	4	Hiroki Sekine
CB	15	Kota Takai
CB	5	Seiji Kimura
LB	16	Ayumu Ohata
DM	8	Joel Chima Fujita (c)
CM	7	Rihito Yamamoto	(substituted off) 84'
CM	14	Shunsuke Mito	(substituted off) 74'
RF	20	Fuki Yamada	(substituted off) 46'
CF	11	Mao Hosoya
LF	10	Koki Saito	(substituted off) 67'
Substitutes:
GK	12	Taishi B. Nozawa
DF	2	Kaito Suzuki
DF	21	Takashi Uchino
MF	13	Ryotaro Araki	(substituted on) 84'
FW	9	Shōta Fujio	(substituted on) 46'
FW	18	Kein Sato	(substituted on) 67'
FW	19	Asahi Uenaka	(substituted on) 74'
Manager:
Gō Ōiwa

GK	1	Arnau Tenas
RB	2	Marc Pubill
CB	4	Eric García	(yellow card) 1'
CB	5	Pau Cubarsí
LB	3	Juan Miranda
CM	6	Pablo Barrios
CM	10	Álex Baena	(yellow card) 45+7'	(substituted off) 70'
RW	14	Aimar Oroz		(substituted off) 84'
AM	11	Fermín López	(yellow card) 78'	(substituted off) 84'
LW	17	Sergio Gómez		(substituted off) 88'
CF	9	Abel Ruiz (c)		(substituted off) 89'
Substitutes:
GK	13	Joan García
DF	12	Jon Pacheco
DF	15	Miguel Gutiérrez		(substituted on) 89'
MF	8	Beñat Turrientes		(substituted on) 84'
MF	16	Adrián Bernabé		(substituted on) 70'
FW	7	Diego López		(substituted on) 84'
FW	18	Samu Aghehowa		(substituted on) 88'
Manager:
Santi Denia

Assistant referees:
Jerson Emiliano dos Santos (Angola)
Stephen Yiembe (Kenya)
Fourth official:
Mahmood Ali Ismail (Sudan)
Reserve assistant referee:
Elvis Noupue (Cameroon)
Video assistant referee:
Jérôme Brisard (France)
Assistant video assistant referees:
Khamis Al-Marri (Qatar)
Daiane Muniz (Brazil)

=== Egypt vs Paraguay ===
2 August 2024
19:00

Egypt	1–1 (a.e.t.)	Paraguay
Adel 88'	Report	D. Gómez 71'
Penalties
Koka (penalty scored); Elneny (penalty scored); El Debes (penalty scored); Abdelmaguid (penalty scored); Adel (penalty scored)	5–4	(penalty scored) D. Gómez; (penalty missed) Pérez; (penalty scored) Viera; (penalty scored) M. Gómez; (penalty scored) Balbuena

Stade de Marseille, Marseille
Attendance: 23,753
Referee: Glenn Nyberg (Sweden)

Egypt	Paraguay

GK	1	Hamza Alaa
RB	4	Ahmed Eid
CB	2	Omar Fayed
CB	5	Hossam Abdelmaguid
LB	7	Mahmoud Saber		(substituted off) 78'
DM	17	Mohamed Elneny (c)
CM	12	Ahmed Koka	(yellow card) 66'
CM	6	Mohamed Shehata		(substituted off) 78'
RF	14	Ahmed Sayed	(yellow card) 82'	(substituted off) 111'
CF	9	Osama Faisal		(substituted off) 78'
LF	10	Ibrahim Adel
Substitutes:
GK	16	Ali El Gabry
DF	13	Karim El Debes		(substituted on) 111'
DF	15	Mohamed Tarek
MF	3	Ahmed Atef	(yellow card) 100'	(substituted on) 78'
MF	8	Ziad Kamal
MF	11	Mostafa Saad		(substituted on) 78'
FW	18	Bilal Mazhar		(substituted on) 78'
Manager:
(Brazil) Rogério Micale

GK	1	Gatito Fernández
RB	2	Alan Núñez
CB	14	Fabián Balbuena
CB	3	Ronaldo De Jesús
LB	4	Daniel Rivas
RM	8	Diego Gómez (c)
CM	6	Marcos Gómez
CM	10	Wilder Viera	(yellow card) 90+6'
LM	13	Alexis Cantero		(substituted off) 70'
CF	18	Marcelo Pérez	(yellow card) 100'
CF	15	Julio Enciso		(substituted off) 78'
Substitutes:
GK	12	Rodrigo Frutos
DF	5	Gilberto Flores	(yellow card) 86'	(substituted on) 78'
DF	16	Fernando Román
MF	20	Ángel Cardozo Lucena		(substituted on) 70'
FW	9	Kevin Parzajuk
Manager:
Carlos Jara Saguier

Assistant referees:
Mahbod Beigi (Sweden)
Andreas Söderkvist (Sweden)
Fourth official:
Drew Fischer (Canada)
Reserve assistant referee:
Micheal Barwegen (Canada)
Video assistant referee:
Ivan Bebek (Croatia)
Assistant video assistant referees:
Guillermo Pacheco (Mexico)
David Coote (Great Britain)

=== France vs Argentina ===
2 August 2024
21:00

France	1–0	Argentina
Mateta 5'	Report

Stade de Bordeaux, Bordeaux
Attendance: 37,153
Referee: Ilgiz Tantashev (Uzbekistan)

France	Argentina

GK	16	Guillaume Restes	(yellow card) 76'
RB	5	Kiliann Sildillia
CB	4	Loïc Badé
CB	2	Castello Lukeba
LB	3	Adrien Truffert		(substituted off) 63'
DM	6	Manu Koné	(yellow card) 41'
CM	12	Enzo Millot	(red card) 90+12'	(substituted off) 90+5'
CM	13	Joris Chotard		(substituted off) 79'
AM	7	Michael Olise
CF	14	Jean-Philippe Mateta	(yellow card) 33'
CF	10	Alexandre Lacazette (c)		(substituted off) 80'
Substitutes:
GK	1	Obed Nkambadio
DF	15	Bradley Locko		(substituted on) 63'
DF	17	Soungoutou Magassa	(yellow card) 90+5'	(substituted on) 90+5'
MF	8	Maghnes Akliouche	(yellow card) 89'	(substituted on) 79'
MF	11	Désiré Doué
FW	9	Arnaud Kalimuendo		(substituted on) 80'
FW	18	Rayan Cherki
Manager:
Thierry Henry

GK	1	Gerónimo Rulli
RB	4	Joaquín García	(yellow card) 83'	(substituted off) 90'
CB	2	Marco Di Cesare	(yellow card) 21'	(substituted off) 46'
CB	16	Nicolás Otamendi (c)
LB	6	Bruno Amione
RM	7	Kevin Zenón		(substituted off) 64'
CM	8	Cristian Medina	(yellow card) 53'	(substituted off) 90'
CM	5	Ezequiel Fernández
LM	10	Thiago Almada
CF	17	Giuliano Simeone
CF	9	Julián Álvarez
Substitutes:
GK	12	Leandro Brey
DF	3	Julio Soler		(substituted on) 46' (substituted off) 76'
DF	13	Gonzalo Luján		(substituted on) 90'
MF	11	Claudio Echeverri		(substituted on) 90'
MF	14	Santiago Hezze
FW	15	Luciano Gondou		(substituted on) 76'
FW	18	Lucas Beltrán	(yellow card) 55'	(substituted on) 64'
Manager:
Javier Mascherano			(yellow card) 55'

Assistant referees:
Andrey Tsapenko (Uzbekistan)
Timur Gaynullin (Uzbekistan)
Fourth official:
Saíd Martínez (Honduras)
Reserve assistant referee:
Walter López (Honduras)
Video assistant referee:
Tatiana Guzmán (Nicaragua)
Assistant video assistant referees:
Leodán González (Uruguay)
Ovidiu Hațegan (Romania)

== Semi-finals ==
=== Morocco vs Spain ===
In the 17th minute, Uzbekistani referee Ilgiz Tantashev was replaced, having sustained an injury in a collision with Spanish defender Marc Pubill. The fourth official—Glenn Nyberg of Sweden—replaced Tantashev. English referee Rebecca Welch subsequently took up the fourth official role.

5 August 2024
18:00

Morocco	1–2	Spain
Rahimi 37' (pen.)	Report	López 65'; Juanlu 86'

Stade de Marseille, Marseille
Attendance: 59,882
Referee: Ilgiz Tantashev (Uzbekistan) (substituted off) 17'
Glenn Nyberg (Sweden) (substituted on) 17'

Morocco	Spain

GK	1	Munir Mohamedi
RB	2	Achraf Hakimi (c)
CB	17	Oussama El Azzouzi
CB	14	Oussama Targhalline
LB	7	Eliesse Ben Seghir
DM	4	Mehdi Boukamir		(substituted off) 88'
RM	11	Zakaria El Ouahdi
CM	18	Amir Richardson	(yellow card) 76'
LM	16	Abde Ezzalzouli
CF	10	Ilias Akhomach
CF	9	Soufiane Rahimi	(yellow card) 37'
Substitutes:
GK	12	Rachid Ghanimi
DF	3	Akram Nakach
DF	5	Adil Tahif
MF	6	Benjamin Bouchouari
MF	13	Yassine Kechta
FW	15	El Mehdi Maouhoub		(substituted on) 88'
Manager:
Tarik Sektioui

GK	1	Arnau Tenas	(yellow card) 37'
RB	2	Marc Pubill		(substituted off) 62'
CB	4	Eric García
CB	5	Pau Cubarsí
LB	3	Juan Miranda		(substituted off) 62'
CM	6	Pablo Barrios		(substituted off) 62'
CM	10	Álex Baena		(substituted off) 90+2'
RW	14	Aimar Oroz
AM	11	Fermín López	(yellow card) 67'	(substituted off) 89'
LW	17	Sergio Gómez
CF	9	Abel Ruiz (c)
Substitutes:
GK	13	Joan García
DF	12	Jon Pacheco
DF	15	Miguel Gutiérrez		(substituted on) 62'
DF	20	Juanlu Sánchez		(substituted on) 62'
MF	8	Beñat Turrientes		(substituted on) 89'
MF	16	Adrián Bernabé	(yellow card) 72'	(substituted on) 62'
FW	18	Samu Aghehowa		(substituted on) 90+2'
Manager:
Santi Denia

Assistant referees:
Andrey Tsapenko (Uzbekistan)
Timur Gaynullin (Uzbekistan)
Fourth official:
Glenn Nyberg (Sweden) (substituted off) 17'
Rebecca Welch (Great Britain) (substituted on) 46'
Reserve assistant referee:
Andreas Söderkvist (Sweden)
Video assistant referee:
Tatiana Guzmán (Nicaragua)
Assistant video assistant referees:
Rodrigo Carvajal (Chile)
Khamis Al-Marri (Qatar)

=== France vs Egypt ===
5 August 2024
21:00

France	3–1 (a.e.t.)	Egypt
Mateta 83', 99'; Olise 108'	Report	Saber 62'

Stade de Lyon, Décines-Charpieu
Attendance: 47,530
Referee: Saíd Martínez (Honduras)

France	Egypt

GK	16	Guillaume Restes
RB	5	Kiliann Sildillia
CB	4	Loïc Badé	(yellow card) 89'
CB	2	Castello Lukeba	(yellow card) 105+4'
LB	3	Adrien Truffert
CM	8	Maghnes Akliouche		(substituted off) 119'
CM	20	Andy Diouf		(substituted off) 76'
CM	13	Joris Chotard
AM	7	Michael Olise
CF	14	Jean-Philippe Mateta		(substituted off) 118'
CF	10	Alexandre Lacazette (c)		(substituted off) 105'
Substitutes:
GK	1	Obed Nkambadio
DF	15	Bradley Locko
DF	17	Soungoutou Magassa		(substituted on) 119'
MF	11	Désiré Doué		(substituted on) 76'
FW	9	Arnaud Kalimuendo		(substituted on) 105'
FW	18	Rayan Cherki		(substituted on) 118'
Manager:
Thierry Henry

GK	1	Hamza Alaa
RB	7	Mahmoud Saber		(substituted off) 98'
CB	2	Omar Fayed	(yellow card) 90+7' (yellow-red card) 92'
CB	5	Hossam Abdelmaguid
LB	13	Karim El Debes		(substituted off) 90'
DM	17	Mohamed Elneny (c)
CM	12	Ahmed Koka
CM	6	Mohamed Shehata		(substituted off) 111'
RF	14	Ahmed Sayed	(yellow card) 105+1'	(substituted off) 111'
CF	9	Osama Faisal		(substituted off) 90'
LF	10	Ibrahim Adel		(substituted off) 93'
Substitutes:
GK	16	Ali El Gabry
DF	15	Mohamed Tarek		(substituted on) 93'
MF	3	Ahmed Atef		(substituted on) 90'
MF	8	Ziad Kamal	(yellow card) 105+2'	(substituted on) 98'
MF	11	Mostafa Saad		(substituted on) 111'
MF	19	Mohamed Hamdy		(substituted on) 111'
FW	18	Bilal Mazhar		(substituted on) 90'
Manager:
(Brazil) Rogério Micale			(yellow card) 90+7'

Assistant referees:
Walter López (Honduras)
Christian Ramírez (Honduras)
Fourth official:
Drew Fischer (Canada)
Reserve assistant referee:
Micheal Barwegen (Canada)
Video assistant referee:
Leodán González (Uruguay)
Assistant video assistant referees:
Guillermo Pacheco (Mexico)
Daiane Muniz (Brazil)

== Bronze medal match ==
8 August 2024
17:00

Egypt	0–6	Morocco
	Report	Ezzalzouli 23'; Rahimi 26', 64'; El Khannouss 51'; Nakach 73'; Hakimi 87'

Stade de la Beaujoire, Nantes
Attendance: 27,391
Referee: Espen Eskås (Norway)

Egypt	Morocco

GK	1	Hamza Alaa
RB	6	Mohamed Shehata		(substituted off) 86'
CB	15	Mohamed Tarek
CB	5	Hossam Abdelmaguid
LB	13	Karim El Debes		(substituted off) 46'
DM	17	Mohamed Elneny (c)
CM	12	Ahmed Koka
CM	7	Mahmoud Saber		(substituted off) 56'
RF	14	Ahmed Sayed		(substituted off) 12'
CF	9	Osama Faisal		(substituted off) 86'
LF	10	Ibrahim Adel	(yellow card) 31'
Substitutes:
GK	16	Ali El Gabry
MF	3	Ahmed Atef	(yellow card) 50'	(substituted on) 46'
MF	8	Ziad Kamal		(substituted on) 56'
MF	11	Mostafa Saad		(substituted on) 12'
MF	19	Mohamed Hamdy		(substituted on) 86'
FW	18	Bilal Mazhar		(substituted on) 86'
Manager:
(Brazil) Rogério Micale

GK	1	Munir Mohamedi
RB	2	Achraf Hakimi (c)	(yellow card) 61'
CB	3	Akram Nakach		(substituted off) 81'
CB	4	Mehdi Boukamir
LB	14	Oussama Targhalline		(substituted off) 63'
CM	11	Zakaria El Ouahdi
CM	18	Amir Richardson		(substituted off) 77'
CM	16	Abde Ezzalzouli		(substituted off) 77'
AM	8	Bilal El Khannous		(substituted off) 77'
CF	10	Ilias Akhomach
CF	9	Soufiane Rahimi
Substitutes:
GK	12	Rachid Ghanimi
DF	5	Adil Tahif		(substituted on) 81'
DF	19	Haytam Manaout
MF	6	Benjamin Bouchouari		(substituted on) 77'
MF	13	Yassine Kechta		(substituted on) 63'
FW	7	Eliesse Ben Seghir		(substituted on) 77'
FW	15	El Mehdi Maouhoub		(substituted on) 77'
Manager:
Tarik Sektioui

Assistant referees:
Jan Erik Engan (Norway)
Isaak Bashevkin (Norway)
Fourth official:
François Letexier (France)
Reserve assistant referee:
Cyril Mugnier (France)
Video assistant referee:
Rob Dieperink (Netherlands)
Assistant video assistant referees:
Leodán González (Uruguay)
Sivakorn Pu-udom (Thailand)

== Gold medal match ==
9 August 2024
18:00

France	3–5 (a.e.t.)	Spain
Millot 11'; Akliouche 79'; Mateta 90+3' (pen.)	Report	López 18', 25'; Baena 28'; Camello 100', 120+1'

Parc des Princes, Paris
Attendance: 44,260
Referee: Ramon Abatti (Brazil)

France	Spain

GK	16	Guillaume Restes
RB	5	Kiliann Sildillia		(substituted off) 111'
CB	4	Loïc Badé	(yellow card) 45+5'
CB	2	Castello Lukeba
LB	3	Adrien Truffert		(substituted off) 91'
DM	6	Manu Koné	(yellow card) 36'	(substituted off) 106'
CM	12	Enzo Millot		(substituted off) 77'
CM	13	Joris Chotard		(substituted off) 52'
AM	7	Michael Olise
CF	10	Alexandre Lacazette (c)		(substituted off) 52'
CF	14	Jean-Philippe Mateta
Substitutes:
GK	1	Obed Nkambadio
DF	15	Bradley Locko		(substituted on) 91'
DF	17	Soungoutou Magassa		(substituted on) 106'
MF	8	Maghnes Akliouche		(substituted on) 52'
MF	18	Rayan Cherki		(substituted on) 111'
FW	9	Arnaud Kalimuendo		(substituted on) 52'
FW	11	Désiré Doué		(substituted on) 77'
Manager:
Thierry Henry

GK	1	Arnau Tenas
CB	2	Marc Pubill		(substituted off) 73'
CB	4	Eric García
CB	5	Pau Cubarsí
RM	3	Juan Miranda	(yellow card) 90+2'	(substituted off) 98'
CM	14	Aimar Oroz		(substituted off) 88'
CM	6	Pablo Barrios
CM	11	Fermín López		(substituted off) 73'
LM	17	Sergio Gómez
SS	10	Álex Baena	(yellow card) 78'	(substituted off) 83'
CF	9	Abel Ruiz (c)		(substituted off) 83'
Substitutes:
GK	13	Joan García
DF	12	Jon Pacheco	(yellow card) 94'	(substituted on) 88'
DF	15	Miguel Gutiérrez		(substituted on) 98'
DF	20	Juanlu Sánchez		(substituted on) 73'
MF	8	Beñat Turrientes		(substituted on) 83'
MF	16	Adrián Bernabé	(yellow card) 76'	(substituted on) 73'
FW	21	Sergio Camello	(yellow card) 120+2'	(substituted on) 83'
Manager:
Santi Denia

Assistant referees:
Rafael Alves (Brazil)
Guillerme Camilo (Brazil)
Fourth official:
Dahane Beida (Mauritania)
Reserve assistant referee:
Jerson Emiliano dos Santos (Angola)
Video assistant referee:
Tatiana Guzmán (Nicaragua)
Assistant video assistant referees:
David Coote (Great Britain)
Ovidiu Hațegan (Romania)
