= Football at the 2024 Summer Olympics =

Football at the Games of the XXXIII Olympiad
- Football pictogram for the 2024 Summer Olympics

Event details
- Games: 2024 Summer Olympics
- Host country: France
- Dates: 24 July – 10 August
- Venues: 7 (in 7 host cities)
- Competitors: 504 from 23 nations

Men's tournament
- Teams: 16 (from 6 confederations)
Medalists
Gold	Spain
Silver	France
Bronze	Morocco

Women's tournament
- Teams: 12 (from 6 confederations)
Medalists
Gold	United States
Silver	Brazil
Bronze	Germany

Editions
- ← 2020 2028 →

The football tournament at the 2024 Summer Olympics took place from 24 July to 10 August 2024 in France. The draw took place in Paris on 20 March 2024.

In addition to the Olympic host city of Paris, matches were also played in Bordeaux, Décines-Charpieu (near Lyon), Marseille, Nantes, Nice and Saint-Étienne.

The games held separate tournaments for men and women Associations affiliated with FIFA participated in qualifying tournaments to clinch their spots for the Olympics. Men's teams were restricted to under-23 players (born on or after 1 January 2001) with a maximum of three overage players allowed, while there were no age restrictions on women's teams.

Canada were the women's defending champions but lost in the quarter-finals. Brazil were the two-time men's defending champions but did not qualify.

== Competition schedule ==
The competition schedule was announced on 1 April 2022. The final match schedule was confirmed by FIFA on 28 July 2022.

GS	Group stage	QF	Quarter-finals	SF	Semi-finals	B	Bronze medal match	F	Gold medal match

Date Event	Wed 24	Thu 25	Fri 26	Sat 27	Sun 28	Mon 29	Tue 30	Wed 31	Thu 1	Fri 2	Sat 3	Sun 4	Mon 5	Tue 6	Wed 7	Thu 8	Fri 9	Sat 10
Men	GS			GS			GS			QF			SF			B	F	
Women		GS			GS			GS			QF			SF			B	F

== Venues ==
A total of seven stadiums are used, as confirmed on 17 December 2020.

Marseille	Décines-Charpieu (Lyon Area)	Paris
Stade de Marseille	Stade de Lyon	Parc des Princes
Capacity: 67,394	Capacity: 59,186	Capacity: 47,929
Location of the host cities of the football at the 2024 Summer Olympics.		Bordeaux
Location of the host cities of the football at the 2024 Summer Olympics.		Stade de Bordeaux
Location of the host cities of the football at the 2024 Summer Olympics.		Capacity: 42,115
Saint-Étienne	Nice	Nantes
Stade Geoffroy-Guichard	Stade de Nice	Stade de la Beaujoire
Capacity: 41,965	Capacity: 36,178	Capacity: 35,322

== Qualification ==
The FIFA Council approved the distribution of spots at their meeting on 24 February 2022.

=== Qualification summary ===
Nation	Men's	Women's	Athletes
Argentina	Yes		18
Australia		Yes	18
Brazil		Yes	18
Canada		Yes	18
Colombia		Yes	18
Dominican Republic	Yes		18
Egypt	Yes		18
France	Yes	Yes	36
Germany		Yes	18
Guinea	Yes		18
Iraq	Yes		18
Israel	Yes		18
Japan	Yes	Yes	36
Mali	Yes		18
Morocco	Yes		18
New Zealand	Yes	Yes	36
Nigeria		Yes	18
Paraguay	Yes		18
Spain	Yes	Yes	36
Ukraine	Yes		18
United States	Yes	Yes	36
Uzbekistan	Yes		18
Zambia		Yes	18
Total: 23 NOCs	16/16	12/12	504/504

=== Men's qualification ===
In addition to host nation France, 15 men's national under-23 teams qualified from 6 separate continental confederations.

Means of qualification	Date(s) (Note: Dates and venues are those of final tournaments (or final round of qualification tournaments); various qualification stages may precede these matches.)	Venue(s)	Berth(s)	Qualified
Host nation	—N/a	—N/a	1	France
2022 CONCACAF U-20 Championship	18 June – 3 July 2022	Honduras	2	United States; Dominican Republic
2023 UEFA European Under-21 Championship	21 June – 8 July 2023	Georgia; Romania	3	Spain; Israel; Ukraine
2023 U-23 Africa Cup of Nations	24 June – 8 July 2023	Morocco	3	Morocco; Egypt; Mali
2023 OFC Olympic Qualifying Tournament	27 August – 9 September 2023	New Zealand	1	New Zealand
2024 CONMEBOL Pre-Olympic Tournament	20 January – 11 February 2024	Venezuela	2	Paraguay; Argentina
2024 AFC U-23 Asian Cup	15 April – 3 May 2024	Qatar	3	Japan; Uzbekistan; Iraq
AFC–CAF play-off	9 May 2024	France	1	Guinea
Total			16	

=== Women's qualification ===
In addition to host nation France, 11 women's national teams qualified from 6 separate continental confederations.

Means of qualification	Dates (Note: Dates and venues are those of final tournaments (or final round of qualification tournaments); various qualification stages may precede these matches.)	Venue(s)	Berth(s)	Qualified
Host nation	—N/a	—N/a	1	France
2022 CONCACAF W Championship	4–18 July 2022	Mexico	1	United States
2022 Copa América Femenina	8–30 July 2022	Colombia	2	Brazil; Colombia
CONCACAF play-off	22–26 September 2023	Jamaica; Canada	1	Canada
2024 OFC Olympic Qualifying Tournament	7–19 February 2024	Samoa	1	New Zealand
2024 UEFA Women's Nations League Finals	23–28 February 2024	Multiple	2	Spain; Germany
2024 AFC Olympic Qualifying Tournament	24–28 February 2024	Multiple	2	Australia; Japan
2024 CAF Olympic Qualifying Tournament	5–9 April 2024	Multiple	2	Nigeria; Zambia
Total			12	

== Medal summary ==
=== Medal table ===
* Host nation (France)

Rank	NOC	Gold	Silver	Bronze	Total
1	Spain	1	0	0	1
1	United States	1	0	0	1
3	Brazil	0	1	0	1
3	France*	0	1	0	1
5	Germany	0	0	1	1
5	Morocco	0	0	1	1
Totals (6 entries)		2	2	2	6

=== Medalists ===
Event	Gold	Silver	Bronze
Men	Spain; Álex Baena; Pablo Barrios; Adrián Bernabé; Sergio Camello; Pau Cubarsí; Eric García; Joan García; Sergio Gómez; Miguel Gutiérrez; Alejandro Iturbe; Diego López; Fermín López; Juan Miranda; Cristhian Mosquera; Samu Omorodion; Aimar Oroz; Jon Pacheco; Marc Pubill; Abel Ruiz; Juanlu Sánchez; Arnau Tenas; Beñat Turrientes	France; Maghnes Akliouche; Loïc Badé; Rayan Cherki; Joris Chotard; Andy Diouf; Désiré Doué; Arnaud Kalimuendo; Manu Koné; Alexandre Lacazette; Johann Lepenant; Bradley Locko; Castello Lukeba; Soungoutou Magassa; Jean-Philippe Mateta; Chrislain Matsima; Enzo Millot; Obed Nkambadio; Michael Olise; Guillaume Restes; Kiliann Sildillia; Adrien Truffert	Morocco; Ilias Akhomach; Eliesse Ben Seghir; Benjamin Bouchouari; Mehdi Boukamir; Oussama El Azzouzi; Bilal El Khannous; Zakaria El Ouahdi; Abde Ezzalzouli; Rachid Ghanimi; Achraf Hakimi; Yassine Kechta; Haytam Manaout; El Mehdi Maouhoub; Munir Mohamedi; Akram Nakach; Soufiane Rahimi; Amir Richardson; Adil Tahif; Oussama Targhalline
Women	United States; Korbin Albert; Croix Bethune; Sam Coffey; Tierna Davidson; Crystal Dunn; Emily Fox; Naomi Girma; Lindsey Horan; Casey Krueger; Rose Lavelle; Casey Murphy; Alyssa Naeher; Jenna Nighswonger; Trinity Rodman; Emily Sams; Jaedyn Shaw; Sophia Smith; Emily Sonnett; Mallory Swanson; Lynn Williams	Brazil; Adriana; Ana Vitória; Antônia; Angelina; Duda Sampaio; Gabi Nunes; Gabi Portilho; Jheniffer; Kerolin; Lauren; Lorena; Luciana; Ludmila; Marta; Priscila; Rafaelle Souza; Tainá; Tamires; Tarciane; Thaís; Vitória Yaya; Yasmim	Germany; Nicole Anyomi; Ann-Katrin Berger; Jule Brand; Klara Bühl; Sara Doorsoun; Vivien Endemann; Laura Freigang; Merle Frohms; Giulia Gwinn; Marina Hegering; Kathrin Hendrich; Sarai Linder; Sydney Lohmann; Janina Minge; Sjoeke Nüsken; Alexandra Popp; Felicitas Rauch; Lea Schüller; Bibiane Schulze; Elisa Senß

== Men's tournament ==
=== Group stage ===
==== Group A ====
Pos	Team	Pld	W	D	L	GF	GA	GD	Pts	Qualification
1	France (H)	3	3	0	0	7	0	+7	9	Advance to knockout stage
2	United States	3	2	0	1	7	4	+3	6	Advance to knockout stage
3	New Zealand	3	1	0	2	3	8	−5	3	
4	Guinea	3	0	0	3	1	6	−5	0	

Source: FIFA
Rules for classification: Group stage tiebreakers
(H) Hosts

==== Group B ====
Pos	Team	Pld	W	D	L	GF	GA	GD	Pts	Qualification
1	Morocco	3	2	0	1	6	3	+3	6 (Note: Head-to-head points: Morocco 3, Argentina 0.)	Advance to knockout stage
2	Argentina	3	2	0	1	6	3	+3	6	Advance to knockout stage
3	Ukraine	3	1	0	2	3	5	−2	3	
4	Iraq	3	1	0	2	3	7	−4	3	

Source: FIFA
Rules for classification: Group stage tiebreakers

==== Group C ====
Pos	Team	Pld	W	D	L	GF	GA	GD	Pts	Qualification
1	Egypt	3	2	1	0	3	1	+2	7	Advance to knockout stage
2	Spain	3	2	0	1	6	4	+2	6	Advance to knockout stage
3	Dominican Republic	3	0	2	1	2	4	−2	2	
4	Uzbekistan	3	0	1	2	2	4	−2	1	

Source: FIFA
Rules for classification: Group stage tiebreakers

==== Group D ====
Pos	Team	Pld	W	D	L	GF	GA	GD	Pts	Qualification
1	Japan	3	3	0	0	7	0	+7	9	Advance to knockout stage
2	Paraguay	3	2	0	1	5	7	−2	6	Advance to knockout stage
3	Mali	3	0	1	2	1	3	−2	1	
4	Israel	3	0	1	2	3	6	−3	1	

Source: FIFA
Rules for classification: Group stage tiebreakers

=== Knockout stage ===
Quarter-finals
2 August – Bordeaux
France	1
Argentina	0
2 August – Marseille
Egypt (p)	1 (5)
Paraguay	1 (4)
2 August – Paris
Morocco	4
United States	0
2 August – Décines-Charpieu
Japan	0
Spain	3

Semi-finals
5 August – Décines-Charpieu
France (a.e.t.)	3
Egypt	1
5 August – Marseille
Morocco	1
Spain	2

Gold medal match
9 August – Paris
France	3
Spain (a.e.t.)	5
Bronze medal match
8 August – Nantes
Egypt	0
Morocco	6

== Women's tournament ==
=== Group stage ===
==== Group A ====
Pos	Team	Pld	W	D	L	GF	GA	GD	Pts	Qualification
1	France (H)	3	2	0	1	6	5	+1	6	Advance to knockout stage
2	Canada	3	3	0	0	5	2	+3	3 (Note: On 27 July 2024, Canada was penalized 6 points by FIFA for their coaching staff's involvement in illegal drone spying at an official training venue. The decision was upheld by CAS on 31 July.)	Advance to knockout stage
3	Colombia	3	1	0	2	4	4	0	3	Advance to knockout stage
4	New Zealand	3	0	0	3	2	6	−4	0	

Source: FIFA
Rules for classification: Group stage tiebreakers
(H) Hosts

==== Group B ====
Pos	Team	Pld	W	D	L	GF	GA	GD	Pts	Qualification
1	United States	3	3	0	0	9	2	+7	9	Advance to knockout stage
2	Germany	3	2	0	1	8	5	+3	6	Advance to knockout stage
3	Australia	3	1	0	2	7	10	−3	3	
4	Zambia	3	0	0	3	6	13	−7	0	

Source: FIFA
Rules for classification: Group stage tiebreakers

==== Group C ====
Pos	Team	Pld	W	D	L	GF	GA	GD	Pts	Qualification
1	Spain	3	3	0	0	5	1	+4	9	Advance to knockout stage
2	Japan	3	2	0	1	6	4	+2	6	Advance to knockout stage
3	Brazil	3	1	0	2	2	4	−2	3	Advance to knockout stage
4	Nigeria	3	0	0	3	1	5	−4	0	

Source: FIFA
Rules for classification: Group stage tiebreakers

==== Ranking of third-placed teams ====
Pos	Grp	Team	Pld	W	D	L	GF	GA	GD	Pts	Qualification
1	A	Colombia	3	1	0	2	4	4	0	3	Advance to knockout stage
2	C	Brazil	3	1	0	2	2	4	−2	3	Advance to knockout stage
3	B	Australia	3	1	0	2	7	10	−3	3	

Source: FIFA
Rules for classification: 1) Points; 2) Goal difference; 3) Goals scored; 4) Fair play points in all group matches; 5) Drawing of lots.

=== Knockout stage ===
Quarter-finals
3 August – Nantes
France	0
Brazil	1
3 August – Décines-Charpieu
Spain (p)	2 (4)
Colombia	2 (2)
3 August – Paris
United States (a.e.t.)	1
Japan	0
3 August – Marseille
Canada	0 (2)
Germany (p)	0 (4)

Semi-finals
6 August – Marseille
Brazil	4
Spain	2
6 August – Décines-Charpieu
United States (a.e.t.)	1
Germany	0

Gold medal match
10 August – Paris
Brazil	0
United States	1
Bronze medal match
9 August – Décines-Charpieu
Spain	0
Germany	1

== See also ==
- Football at the 2023 African Games
- Football at the 2023 Pan American Games
- Football 5-a-side at the 2024 Summer Paralympics
