= Israel Olympic football team =

National sports team

Israel Olympic
- Nickname(s): הנבחרת האולימפית (The Olympic Chosen Team) הכחולים-לבנים (The Skyblue and Whites)
- Association: Israel Football Association
- Other affiliation: Summer Olympics; FIFA
- Confederation: UEFA (Europe; 1990s–present)
- Head coach: Guy Luzon
- Captain: Omri Gandelman
- FIFA code: ISR
First colours	Second colours

Olympic Games
- Appearances: 3 (first in 1968)
- Best result: Quarter-finals (1968, 1976)

The Israel Olympic football team (Hebrew: נבחרת ישראל בכדורגל האולימפית, also known as Israel under-23 national football team) represents Israel in international football competitions in Olympic Games. The team is one of the Israeli youth football teams, and is only constituted when Israel qualifies for a Summer Olympics Games.

Israel is making its third Olympic appearance, representing Israel at the 2024 Summer Olympics in football in Paris, France, coached by Guy Luzon.

== History ==
Previously, the Israel national team competed in two Olympic Games, in 1968 and 1976, reaching the quarter-final in both times. Since age limit has been set for participants under the age of 23 starting from the 1992 Olympic Games, Israel had experienced a long absence from the Olympic football tournament, failing to qualify.

In the 2023 UEFA European Under-21 Championship, Israel U21 reached the quarter-finals and then defeat the host Georgia 4–3 in a penalty shootout after 0–0 after 120 minutes, thus advancing to the semi-finals for the first time in its history. This achievement also helped secure the team's qualification to the 2024 Olympic Games.

=== 2024 Summer Olympics ===
For the draw, Israel were in Pot 4 with Dominican Republic, Ukraine and Guinea. Israel was drawn to Group D with Japan, Paraguay and Mali. Its opening match of the tournament was against Mali and finished 1-1. The second match was a 4–2 loss to Paraguay with Omri Gandelman and Oscar Gloukh scoring the goals for Israel. Needing to defeat Japan to have any chance to advance, Israel conceded a late goal to lose 1-0 and so finished last in its group. Israel finished 15th at the tournament, just ahead of Guinea.

== Results and fixtures ==
The following is a list of all match results, as well as any future matches that have been scheduled.

Win Draw Loss Fixture

=== 2024 ===
24 July 2024 Summer Olympics – Group stage	Mali	1–1	Israel	Paris, France
22:00	Doumbia 63'	Report	H. Diallo 56' (o.g.)	Stadium: Parc des Princes; Attendance: 10,637; Referee: Campbell-Kirk Kawana-Waugh (New Zealand)

27 July 2024 Summer Olympics – Group stage	Israel	2–4	Paraguay	Paris, France
20:00	Gandelman 53'; Gloukh 80'	Report	M. Fernández 25', 90+6'; Enciso 69'; Balbuena 90+3'	Stadium: Parc des Princes; Referee: Drew Fischer (Canada)

30 July 2024 Summer Olympics – Group stage	Israel	0-1	Japan	Nantes, France
22:00		Report	Hosoya	Stadium: Stade de la Beaujoire

== Head coaches ==
As of 25 July 2024

Manager	Nation	Year	Played	Won	Drawn	Lost	GF	GA	Win %
Guy Luzon	(Israel)	2024	1	0	1	0	1	1	0

== Players ==
=== Current squad ===
- The following players were called up for the 2024 Summer Olympics.

No.	Pos.	Player	Date of birth (age)	Caps	Goals	Club
	GK	Omer Nir'on	17 April 2001 (aged 23)	0	0	(Israel Football Association) Maccabi Netanya
	GK	Niv Eliasi	1 February 2002 (aged 22)	0	0	(Israel Football Association) Hapoel Be'er Sheva
	DF	Ilay Feingold	23 August 2004 (aged 19)	0	0	(Israel Football Association) Maccabi Haifa
	DF	Roy Revivo	22 May 2003 (aged 21)	0	0	(Israel Football Association) Maccabi Tel Aviv
	DF	Noam Ben Harush	13 May 2005 (aged 19)	0	0	(Israel Football Association) Hapoel Haifa
	DF	Sean Goldberg*	13 June 1995 (aged 29)	0	0	(Israel Football Association) Maccabi Haifa
	DF	Or Israelov	2 September 2004 (aged 19)	0	0	(Israel Football Association) Hapoel Tel Aviv
	DF	Stav Lemkin	2 April 2003 (aged 21)	0	0	(Ukrainian Association of Football) Shakhtar Donetsk
	MF	Ido Shahar	20 August 2001 (aged 22)	0	0	(Israel Football Association) Maccabi Tel Aviv
	MF	Ayano Preda	29 April 2002 (aged 22)	0	0	(Israel Football Association) Hapoel Jerusalem
	MF	Ethan Azoulay	26 May 2002 (aged 22)	0	0	(Israel Football Association) Maccabi Netanya
	MF	Omri Gandelman* (captain)	16 May 2000 (aged 24)	0	0	(Royal Belgian Football Association) Gent
	MF	Adi Yona	17 April 2004 (aged 20)	0	0	(Israel Football Association) Beitar Jerusalem
	MF	Oscar Gloukh	1 April 2004 (aged 20)	0	0	(Austrian Football Association) Red Bull Salzburg
	MF	Yanir Ben Eliezer	11 June 2006 (aged 18)	0	0	(Football Association of Singapore) Hougang United
	FW	Osher Davida	18 February 2001 (aged 23)	0	0	(Israel Football Association) Maccabi Tel Aviv
	FW	Liel Abada	3 October 2001 (aged 22)	0	0	(United States Soccer Federation) Charlotte FC
	FW	Elad Madmon	10 February 2004 (aged 20)	0	0	(Israel Football Association) Maccabi Tel Aviv
	FW	Dor Turgeman	24 October 2003 (aged 20)	0	0	(Israel Football Association) Maccabi Tel Aviv

* Overage player.

=== Overage players in Olympic Games ===
Note: The year of the tournament represents the year in which it ends.

Tournament	Player 1	Player 2
2024	Sean Goldberg* (DF)	Omri Gandelman* (MF & captain)

== Summer Olympics record ==
Gold medalists Silver medalists Bronze medalists

Summer Olympics										Qualification						
Year	Host	Round	Pld	W	D	L	F	A	Squad	Pos.	Pld	W	D	L	F	A
1956 to 1988		See Israel national football team								See Israel national football team						
1992	Spain	Did not qualify								See Israel national under-21 football team						
1996	United States	Did not qualify								See Israel national under-21 football team						
2000	Australia	Did not qualify								See Israel national under-21 football team						
2004	Greece	Did not qualify								See Israel national under-21 football team						
2008	China	Did not qualify								See Israel national under-21 football team						
2012	United Kingdom	Did not qualify								See Israel national under-21 football team						
2016	Brazil	Did not qualify								See Israel national under-21 football team						
2020	Japan	Did not qualify								See Israel national under-21 football team						
2024	France	Group stage	3	0	1	2	3	6	Squad	See Israel national under-21 football team						
2028	United States	To be determined								See Israel national under-21 football team						
Total		Group stage	3	0	1	2	3	6	—							

*Denotes draws including knockout matches decided via penalty shoot-out.

== See also ==
- Football at the Summer Olympics
- Israel national football team – senior men's squad
- Israel national under-21 football team
- Israel national under-20 football team
- Israel national under-19 football team
- Israel national under-18 football team
- Israel national under-17 football team
- Israel national under-16 football team
