= Fernando Román =

Fernando Román is the name of:

- Fernando Román (footballer, born 1993), Spanish centre-back
- Fernando Román (footballer, born 1998), Paraguayan left-back
- Fernando Román (footballer, born 2001), Paraguayan defender
