= Stade Atlantique =

Football stadium

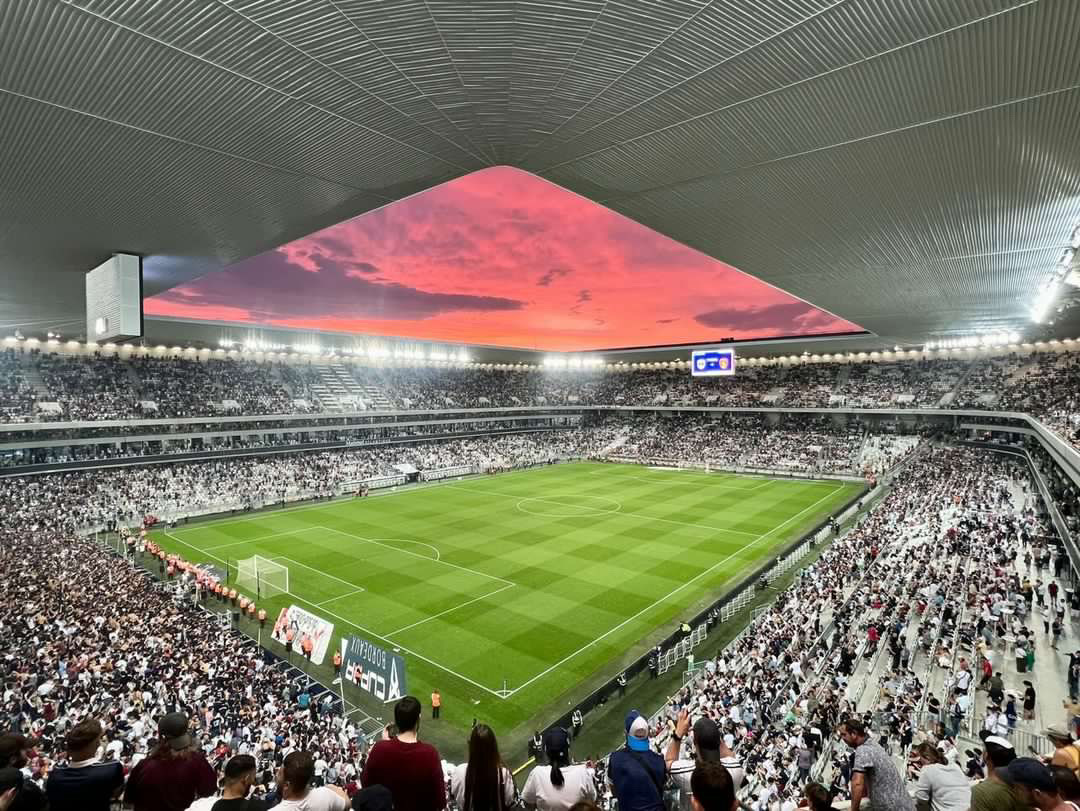
- UEFA
- Interactive map of Stade Atlantique
- Full name: Nouveau Stade de Bordeaux
- Former names: Matmut Atlantique (2015–2024)
- Location: Cours Jules-Ladoumègue, 33300 Bordeaux, Gironde, France
- Coordinates: 44°53′50″N 0°33′42″W
- Owner: Bordeaux Métropole
- Operator: Stade Bordeaux-Atlantique (2015–2024); Bordeaux Métropole (2024–)
- Capacity: 42,115
- Type: Stadium
- Surface: PlayMaster by Tarkett Sports
- Record attendance: 42,071 (Rugby: Stade Toulousain vs Stade Rochelais, 8 June 2019)
- Field size: 105 × 68 metres (344 ft × 223 ft)

Construction
- Groundbreaking: 2012
- Built: 2012–2015
- Opened: 23 May 2015
- Cost: €183 million + €120 million in interest
- Architect: Herzog & de Meuron

Tenant
- FC Girondins de Bordeaux (2015–present)

Website
- Official website

The Stade Atlantique (French pronunciation: [stad atlɑ̃tik]; lit. 'Atlantic Stadium'), also known as the Nouveau Stade de Bordeaux ([nuvo stad də bɔʁdo]; 'New Stadium of Bordeaux'), is a football stadium in Bordeaux, France. It is the home of Régional 1 club FC Girondins de Bordeaux and seats 42,115 spectators.

== History ==
Construction began in November 2012 and ended in April 2015. The stadium was inaugurated on 18 May 2015. The first match was Bordeaux against Montpellier on 23 May 2015, the final day of the league season. The hosts won 2–1, with both goals by Diego Rolan.

The stadium also hosted the semi-finals of the 2014–15 Top 14 season in rugby union, and also hosted five matches in UEFA Euro 2016, including one quarter-final.

On 7 September 2015, it hosted the France national team in a 2–1 friendly win over Serbia. In September 2016, the ground was chosen as the host of the 2018 Coupe de la Ligue Final as part of plans to host the event at various venues outside of Paris.

French-Canadian singer Céline Dion performed the first concert at the stadium on 29 June 2017.

The hard rock band Guns N' Roses performed at the stadium during their Not In This Lifetime...Tour on June 26, 2018.

The stadium was listed as one of six to host football in Paris bid for the 2024 Summer Olympics, which was chosen in July 2017.

In November 2017, after the French bid won, the stadium was confirmed as one of nine to host the 2023 Rugby World Cup.

In 2025, the stadium's sponsorship and naming rights deal with French insurance company Matmut prematurely ended, which had existed since 2015.

== Tournament results ==
=== UEFA Euro 2016 ===
Date	Time (CET)	Team #1	Result	Team #2	Round	Attendance
11 June 2016	18:00	Wales	2–1	Slovakia	Group B	37,831
14 June 2016	18:00	Austria	0–2	Hungary	Group F	34,424
18 June 2016	15:00	Belgium	3–0	Republic of Ireland	Group E	39,493
21 June 2016	21:00	Croatia	2–1	Spain	Group D	37,245
2 July 2016	21:00	Germany	1–1 (6–5 p)	Italy	Quarter-finals	38,764

=== 2023 Rugby World Cup ===
Date	Time (CET)	Team #1	Result	Team #2	Round	Attendance
9 September 2023	15:30	Ireland	82—8	Romania	Pool B	41,170
10 September 2023	21:00	Wales	32–26	Fiji	Pool C	41,274
16 September 2023	15:00	Samoa	43–10	Chile	Pool D	39,291
17 September 2023	15:00	South Africa	76–0	Romania	Pool B	38,789
30 September 2023	17:45	Fiji	17–12	Georgia	Pool C	39,862

=== 2024 Summer Olympics ===
Date	Team #1	Result	Team #2	Round	Attendance
24 July 2024	Japan	5–0	Paraguay	Men's group D	14,000
25 July 2024	Nigeria	0–1	Brazil	Women's group C	6,244
27 July 2024	Dominican Republic	1–3	Spain	Men's group C	16,099
27 July 2024	Japan	1–0	Mali	Men's group D	9,893
30 July 2024	Spain	1–2	Egypt	Men's group C	12,180
31 July 2024	Brazil	0–2	Spain	Women's group C	14,497
2 August 2024	France	1–0	Argentina	Men's quarter-finals	37,153

== Concerts ==
Concerts at Nouveau Stade de Bordeaux
Date	Artist	Tour	Attendance
29 June 2017	(Canada) Céline Dion	Celine Dion Live 2017	31,140
26 June 2018	(United States) Guns N' Roses	Not in This Lifetime... Tour	29,389
29 May 2019	(United Kingdom) Ed Sheeran	÷ Tour	41,449
16 July 2019	(United Kingdom) Muse	Simulation Theory World Tour	38,613
4 June 2022	(France) Indochine	Central Tour	53,483
4 July 2023	(United Kingdom) Depeche Mode	Memento Mori World Tour	
14-15 July 2023	(France) Mylene Farmer	Nevermore 2023	
1 August 2023	(Canada) The Weeknd	After Hours til Dawn Tour	38,251

== Gallery ==
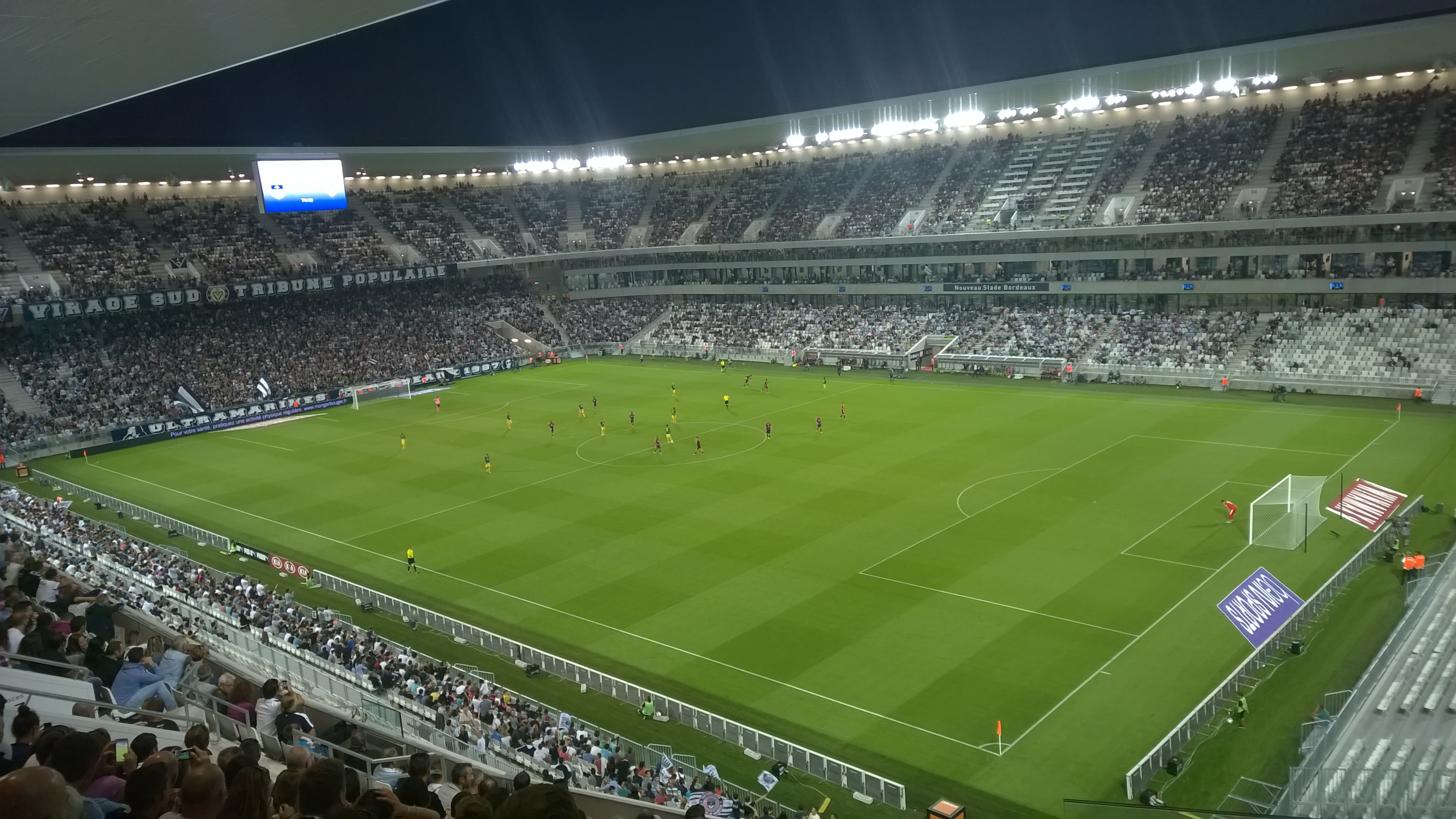
Internal view

Under construction

== See also ==
- List of football stadiums in France
- Lists of stadiums

Preceded by Parc Olympique Lyonnais; Lyon	Coupe de la Ligue; Final Venue; 2017–18	Succeeded by Stade Pierre-Mauroy; Lille
