= Enso González =

Paraguayan footballer (born 2005)

Personal information
- Full name: Enso David González Medina
- Date of birth: 20 January 2005 (age 21)
- Place of birth: Asunción, Paraguay
- Height: 1.69 m (5 ft 7 in)
- Position: Left winger

Team information
- Current team: Wolverhampton Wanderers
- Number: 30

Youth career
- –2022: Libertad

Senior career*
Years	Team	Apps	(Gls)
2022–2023	Libertad	32	(3)
2023–	Wolverhampton Wanderers	1	(0)

International career^{‡}
2025	Paraguay U20	2	(1)
2023–2024	Paraguay U23	15	(1)
2026–	Paraguay	1	(0)
- * Club domestic league appearances and goals as of 10 October 2026 ‡ National team caps and goals as of 27 September 2026

Enso David González Medina (born 20 January 2005) is a Paraguayan professional footballer who plays as a left winger for EFL Championship club Wolverhampton Wanderers and the Paraguay national team.

== Club career ==
=== Libertad ===
Born in the Paraguayan capital of Asunción, González played futsal as a child. He began his footballing career with Libertad, making his professional debut on 4 September 2022, coming on as a late substitute for Álex Campuzano in a 1–0 loss to Cerro Porteño in the Paraguayan Primera División.

He scored his first goal for the club in the following season, the first in a 4–0 win against Resistencia on 17 April 2023. Following the game, Libertad manager Daniel Garnero compared him with compatriot Julio Enciso, stating that "Julito (Enciso) is the jewel and Enso is the diamond". His second goal for the club came in the same month, against Nacional, on 29 April; having started the match, he received the ball from Héctor Villalba on the edge of the penalty area, and cutting in from the right, he skipped past two Nacional defenders before rifling the ball into the top right-hand corner. In July 2023, he was named by the International Centre for Sports Studies (CIES) as the fourth most experienced under-19 winger in the world.

=== Wolverhampton Wanderers ===
The following month, he was linked heavily with a move to English Premier League side Wolverhampton Wanderers, with American sports journalism website The Athletic claiming that a deal had been agreed worth €6 million. On 31 August 2023, the move was confirmed by Wolverhampton Wanderers, and González signed a five-year deal with the West Midlands club.

González made his debut on 11 May 2024 in a 3–1 defeat against Crystal Palace at Molineux Stadium, replacing Tote Gomes in the 90th minute.

== International career ==
On 27 September 2026, González made his debut for the Paraguay national team in a friendly against Bolivia.

== Career statistics ==
=== Club ===
As of match played 11 May 2024

Appearances and goals by club, season and competition
Club	Season	League			National cup		League cup		Continental		Other		Total	
Club	Season	Division	Apps	Goals	Apps	Goals	Apps	Goals	Apps	Goals	Apps	Goals	Apps	Goals
Libertad	2022	Paraguayan Primera División	9	0	0	0	–		0	0	–		9	0
Libertad	2023	Paraguayan Primera División	23	3	0	0	–		7 (Note: Four appearances in Copa Libertadores, three appearances in Copa Sudamericana)	0	–		30	3
Libertad	Total		32	3	0	0	–		7	0	–		39	3
Wolverhampton Wanderers	2023–24	Premier League	1	0	0	0	0	0	–		–		1	0
Wolverhampton Wanderers	2024–25	Premier League	0	0	0	0	0	0	–		–		0	0
Wolverhampton Wanderers	2025–26	Premier League	0	0	0	0	0	0	–		–		0	0
Wolverhampton Wanderers	Total		1	0	0	0	0	0	–		–		1	0
Career total			33	3	0	0	0	0	7	0	0	0	40	3
