= Oscar Gloukh =

Israeli footballer (born 2004)

Oscar Gloukh אוסקר גלוך
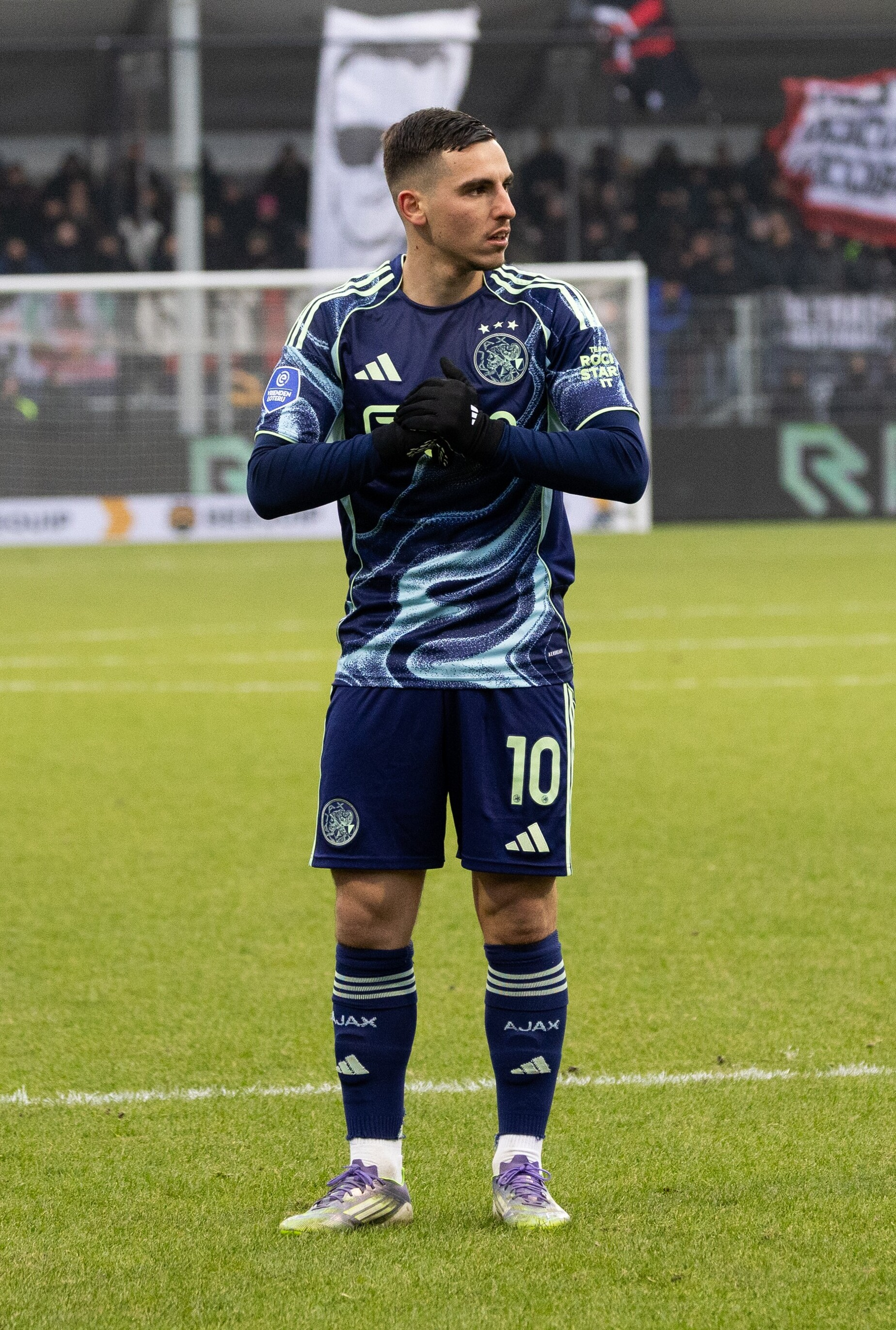
- Gloukh with Ajax in 2026

Personal information
- Date of birth: 1 April 2004 (age 22)
- Place of birth: Rehovot, Israel
- Height: 1.70 m (5 ft 7 in)
- Positions: Attacking midfielder; winger

Team information
- Current team: Ajax
- Number: 10

Youth career
- 2009–2010: Maccabi Sha'arayim
- 2010–2022: Maccabi Tel Aviv

Senior career*
Years	Team	Apps	(Gls)
2022–2023	Maccabi Tel Aviv	25	(7)
2023–2025	Red Bull Salzburg	70	(19)
2025–	Ajax	39	(7)

International career^{‡}
2019–2020	Israel U16	7	(1)
2021	Israel U18	3	(1)
2021–2022	Israel U19	16	(4)
2022–2023	Israel U21	9	(0)
2024	Israel Olympic	3	(2)
2022–	Israel	34	(5)
Medal record
Men's football
Representing Israel
UEFA European Under-19 Championship
Runner-up	2022 Slovakia	Team
- * Club domestic league appearances and goals as of 18:44, 25 October 2026 (UTC) ‡ National team caps and goals as of 15:52, 14 November 2026 (UTC)

Oscar Gloukh (Note: Gloukh's name lacks an established Latin-alphabet spelling, and it has been romanized in various ways. Gloukh is the most common transliteration, but Gloch and Gluh can also be used.) (Hebrew: אוסקר גלוך, Hebrew pronunciation: [ˈoskaʁ ˈɡloχ] GLOKH; born 1 April 2004) is an Israeli professional footballer who plays as an attacking midfielder or winger for Eredivisie club Ajax and the Israel national team.

== Early life ==
Oscar Gloukh was born on 1 April 2004 in Rehovot, Israel and grew up in the Sha'arayim neighbourhood, about 20 kilometres (12 miles) south of Tel Aviv. He is the son of Maxim Gloukh, a former professional footballer of Russian Jewish descent who made aliyah with his family at 13 years old. Once a forward, Maxim played in Ukraine and Moldova, and now runs an independent customs inspection business in Ashdod with his wife.

== Club career ==
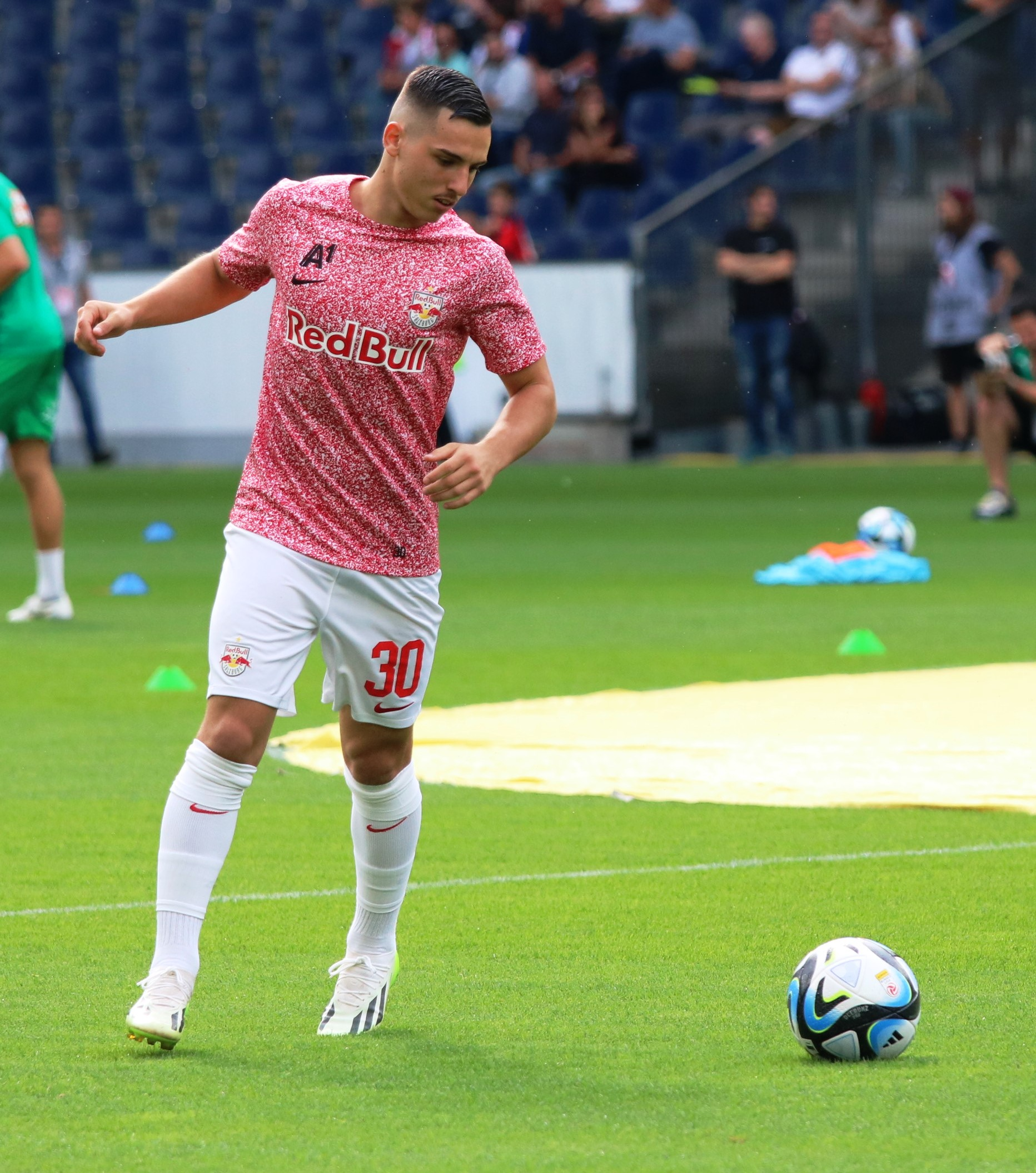
Gloukh warming up ahead of a match with Red Bull Salzburg in 2023

=== Maccabi Tel Aviv ===
Gloukh made his first-team debut with Israeli side Maccabi Tel Aviv on 8 August 2021 in a 1–1 draw against Hapoel Jerusalem in the Israeli Toto Cup, which his side ultimately lost 7–6 on penalties.

On 11 April 2022, he made his Israeli Premier League debut in a 1–1 draw against Maccabi Haifa, in which he also scored first goal for the club in the 28th minute.

=== Red Bull Salzburg ===
On 27 January 2023, Gloukh was acquired by Austrian Bundesliga club Red Bull Salzburg for a fee of €7 million, signing a four-and-a-half-year contract.

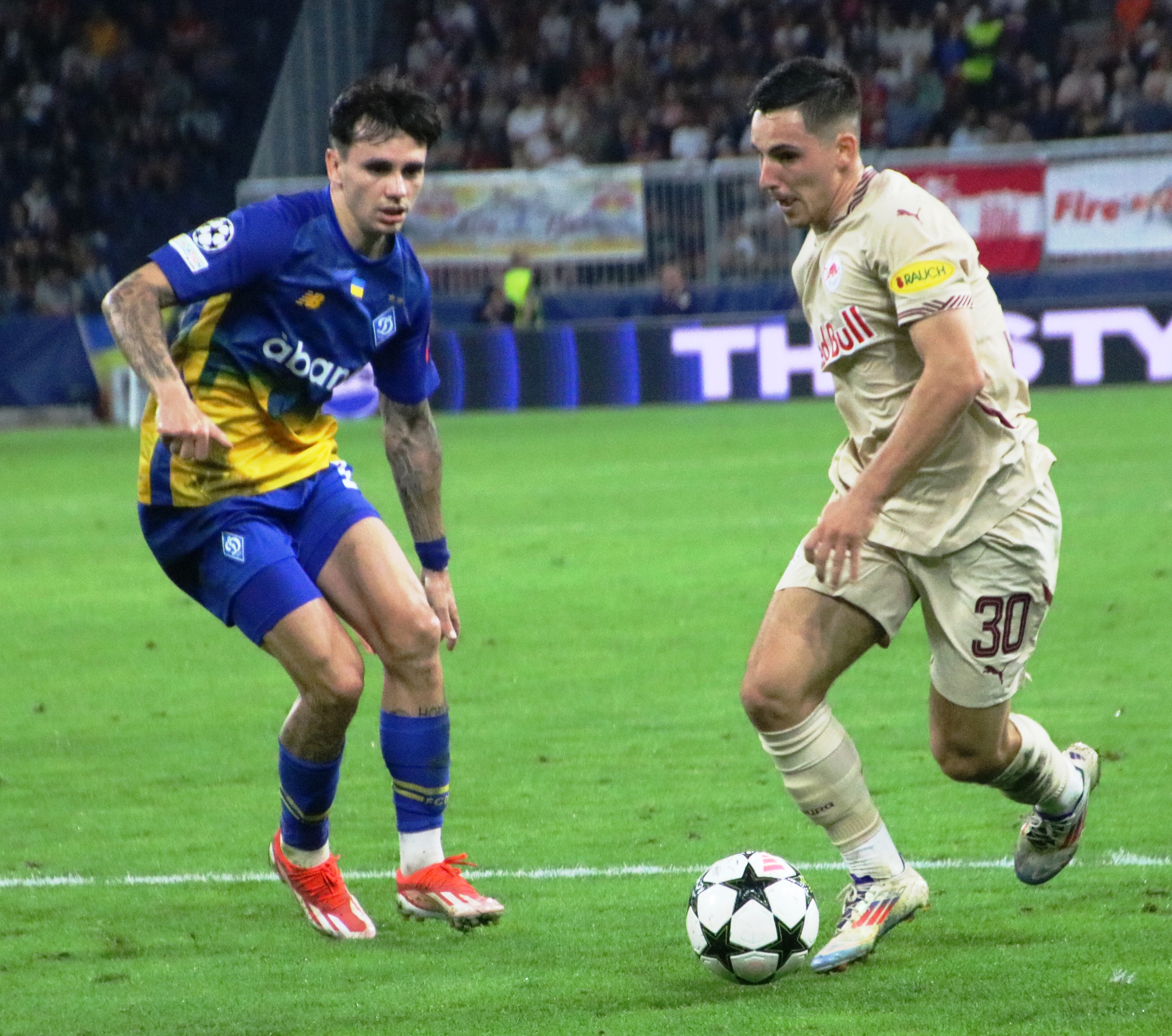
Gloukh (to the right) playing for Red Bull Salzburg in a 2024–25 UEFA Champions League match against Dynamo Kyiv

On 20 September 2023, Gloukh netted a goal in the 51st minute of his UEFA Champions League debut, helping secure a 2–0 away win over Benfica. This made him the then-youngest Israeli footballer ever to score in the Champions League, at the age of 19.

On 18 June 2025, Gloukh scored the opening goal in a 2–1 victory against Mexican side Pachuca on the first round of matches of the 2025 FIFA Club World Cup, becoming the first Israeli to play and score in the FIFA Club World Cup.

=== Ajax ===
On 1 August 2025, Gloukh signed for Eredivisie club Ajax on a five-year contract running until 30 June 2030. The disclosed financial details of the transfer include a base fee of €14.75 million, and a maximum of €2.5 million potential add-ons. According to reports, his contract includes a €1.2 million annual salary net, plus €0.6 million in possible bonuses. He chose the squad number 10 which was previously worn by club legends Dick van Dijk, Dennis Bergkamp, Jari Litmanen, Rafael van der Vaart, and Wesley Sneijder. Ajax technical director Alex Kroes stated about the Israeli: "Oscar is an attacking midfielder who is both creative and talented, contributing goals and assists. He's also an intelligent player with excellent vision, and he is exceptionally eager to learn and ambitious. In our talks, he made it clear that Ajax was the ideal club for his development. His decision to choose Ajax’s sporting project over big money says everything about his character and mentality." Before eventually choosing to join the Godenzonen, Gloukh was also targeted by Atlético Madrid, Porto, RB Leipzig, Roma, and VfB Stuttgart.

"Ajax is a special club. Many legends have played for this club. [...] This club is really big. I've always been an Ajax fan since I was young. I dreamt to play in this stadium. It's like a dream for me. Dušan Tadić was one of my favourite players back then. Frenkie as well."

— Gloukh after his signing for Ajax

== International career ==
=== Youth ===
Gloukh has been capped for the Israel under-19 team, and took part in its qualification to the 2022 UEFA European Under-19 Championship for the second time in its history. In the tournament, Gloukh scored 4 goals (making him the third-highest goalscorer) and made 2 assists, including a goal in the final match against England, a match which ended in a 3–1 defeat after extra time. Gloukh was named one of the tournament's best performers by ESPN, and was named in UEFA's Team of the Tournament. Gloukh's goal against England also earned him the UEFA 2022 Under-19 EURO Goal of the Tournament.

Gloukh has also been part of the Israel under-21 team, making his first appearance on 2 June 2022, and took part in its qualification to the 2023 UEFA European Under-21 Championship for the third time in Israel's history.

Gloukh was selected in the squad to compete in the men's football tournament at the 2024 Summer Olympics. He played all three of Israel's games as they were knocked out in the group stage. He scored an equalizing goal in a 2–2 draw against Paraguay, thus becoming Israel's youngest goalscorer in Olympic history at 20 years and 3 months old.

=== Senior ===
In November 2022, Gloukh received his first call-up to play for the senior Israel national team ahead of the home friendly matches against Zambia and Cyprus. On 17 November, he made his senior international debut, coming on as a substitute in a 4–2 victory over Zambia. Three days later, Gloukh both started in the Israeli line-up against Cyprus, as well as scored his first senior international goal in a 3–2 defeat.

Gloukh took part in Israel's qualification campaign for UEFA Euro 2024. In a match against Belarus on 16 June 2023, he came off the bench in the 57th minute and would go on to score a stoppage-time winning goal to give his side a 2–1 victory.

== Career statistics ==
=== Club ===
As of match played 25 October 2026

Appearances and goals by club, season and competition
Club	Season	League			National cup (Note: Includes Israel State Cup, Austrian Cup, KNVB Cup)		League cup (Note: Includes Israel Toto Cup)		Europe		Other		Total	
Club	Season	Division	Apps	Goals	Apps	Goals	Apps	Goals	Apps	Goals	Apps	Goals	Apps	Goals
Maccabi Tel Aviv	2021–22	Israeli Premier League	8	3	2	0	1	0	0	0	—		11	3
Maccabi Tel Aviv	2022–23	Israeli Premier League	17	4	2	2	2	0	4 (Note: Appearances in UEFA Europa Conference League)	0	—		25	6
Maccabi Tel Aviv	Total		25	7	4	2	3	0	4	0	—		36	9
Red Bull Salzburg	2022–23	Austrian Bundesliga	15	2	—		—		2 (Note: Appearances in UEFA Europa League)	0	—		17	2
Red Bull Salzburg	2023–24	Austrian Bundesliga	29	7	5	0	—		6 (Note: Appearance(s) in UEFA Champions League)	2	—		40	9
Red Bull Salzburg	2024–25	Austrian Bundesliga	26	10	2	1	—		12	0	3 (Note: Appearances in FIFA Club World Cup)	1	43	12
Red Bull Salzburg	2025–26	Austrian Bundesliga	0	0	0	0	—		1	0	—		1	0
Red Bull Salzburg	Total		70	19	7	1	—		21	2	3	1	101	23
Ajax	2025–26	Eredivisie	29	6	1	0	—		8	3	0	0	38	9
Ajax	2026–27	Eredivisie	10	1	0	0	—		7 (Note: Appearances in UEFA Conference League)	4	—		17	5
Ajax	Total		39	7	1	0	—		15	7	0	0	55	14
Career total			134	33	12	3	3	0	40	9	3	1	192	46

=== International ===
As of match played 1 October 2026

Appearances and goals by national team and year
National team	Year	Apps	Goals
Israel	2022	2	1
Israel	2023	9	2
Israel	2024	7	0
Israel	2025	9	1
Israel	2026	5	0
Total		32	5

Scores and results list Israel's goal tally first.

List of international goals scored by Oscar Gloukh
No.	Date	Venue	Opponent	Score	Result	Competition
1	20 November 2022	HaMoshava Stadium, Petah Tikva, Israel	Cyprus	1–2	2–3	Friendly
2	16 June 2023	Szusza Ferenc Stadion, Budapest, Hungary	Belarus	2–1	2–1	UEFA Euro 2024 qualifying
3	9 September 2023	Arena Națională, Bucharest, Romania	Romania	1–1	1–1	UEFA Euro 2024 qualifying
4	5 September 2025	Zimbru Stadium, Chișinău, Moldova	Moldova	4–0	4–0	2026 FIFA World Cup qualification
5	3 June 2026	Arena Kombëtare, Tirana, Albania	Albania	1–0	1–0	Friendly

== Honours ==
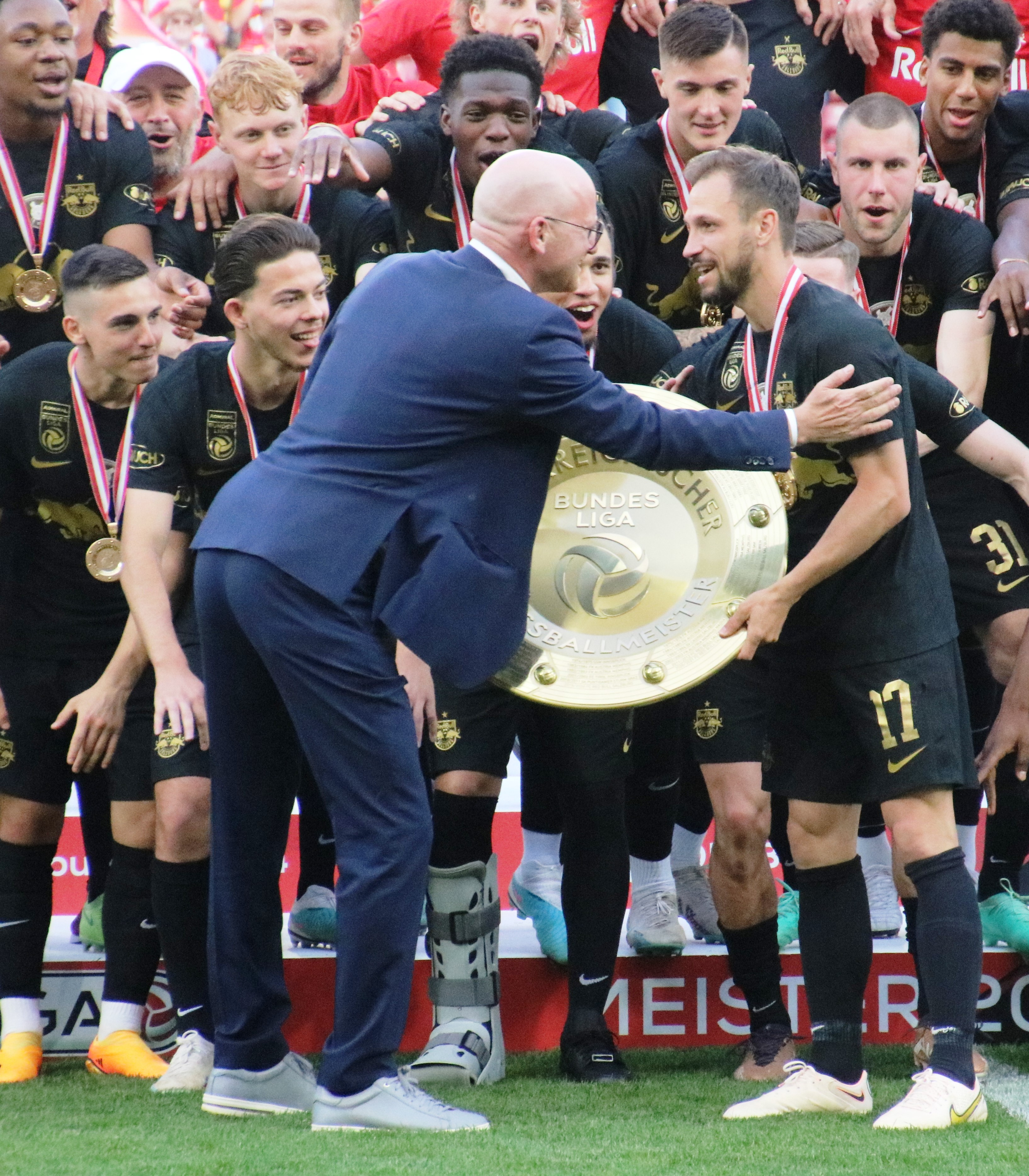
Gloukh (crouching on the far left) celebrating the 2022–23 Austrian Bundesliga championship with Red Bull Salzburg

Red Bull Salzburg

- Austrian Bundesliga: 2022–23

Israel U19

- UEFA European Under-19 Championship runner-up: 2022

Individual

- UEFA European Under-19 Championship Team of the Tournament: 2022
- UEFA European Under-19 Championship Goal of the Tournament: 2022

== See also ==
- List of Israelis
- List of Israel international footballers
