= Or Israelov =

Israeli footballer (born 2004)

Or Israelov אור ישראלוב
Personal information
- Full name: Or Alon Israelov
- Date of birth: 2 September 2004 (age 22)
- Place of birth: Shoham, Israel
- Height: 1.87 m (6 ft 2 in)
- Position: Center-back

Team information
- Current team: Hapoel Tel Aviv
- Number: 21

Youth career
- Hapoel Tel Aviv

Senior career*
Years	Team	Apps	(Gls)
2021–	Hapoel Tel Aviv	43	(1)
2025–2026	→ Estoril (loan)	1	(0)

International career^{‡}
2021–2023	Israel U19	20	(0)
2023	Israel U20	6	(0)
2024	Israel U21	2	(0)
2024	Israel Olympic	1	(0)
Medal record
Representing Israel U-19
UEFA European Under-19 Championship
Runner-up	2022 Slovakia	Team
Representing Israel U-20
FIFA U-20 World Cup
Third place	2023 Argentina	Team
- * Club domestic league appearances and goals as of 12 August 2025 ‡ National team caps and goals as of 7 September 2024

Or Alon Israelov (Hebrew: אור אלון ישראלוב; born 2 September 2004) is an Israeli professional footballer who plays as a center-back for Israeli Premier League club Hapoel Tel Aviv.

== Early life ==
Israelov was born and raised in Shoham to Idit and Eldad Israelov.

== Career statistics ==
=== Club ===
As of 1 June 2024.

Club	Season	League			State Cup		Toto Cup		Continental		Other		Total	
Club	Season	Division	Apps	Goals	Apps	Goals	Apps	Goals	Apps	Goals	Apps	Goals	Apps	Goals
Hapoel Tel Aviv	2021–22	Israeli Premier League	7	0	0	0	1	0	–		0	0	8	0
Hapoel Tel Aviv	2022–23	Israeli Premier League	16	1	0	0	1	0	–		0	0	17	1
Hapoel Tel Aviv	2023–24	Israeli Premier League	9	0	0	0	2	0	–		0	0	11	0
Hapoel Tel Aviv	2024–25	Liga Leumit	0	0	0	0	0	0	–		0	0	0	0
Hapoel Tel Aviv	Total		32	1	0	0	4	0	0	0	0	0	36	1
Career total			32	1	0	0	4	0	0	0	0	0	36	1

== See also ==
- List of Jewish footballers
- List of Jews in sports
- List of Israelis
- List of Israel international footballers
