= Thiemoko Diarra =

Malian footballer (born 2003)

Personal information
- Date of birth: 19 April 2003 (age 23)
- Place of birth: Bamako, Mali
- Height: 1.76 m (5 ft 9 in)
- Position: Left winger

Team information
- Current team: Kasımpaşa

Youth career
- Derby Académie

Senior career*
Years	Team	Apps	(Gls)
2021–2023	Reims B	45	(7)
2023–2026	Reims	24	(3)
2023–2024	→ Châteauroux (loan)	28	(5)
2024–2025	→ Hapoel Haifa (loan)	30	(7)
2026–	Kasımpaşa	0	(0)

International career^{‡}
2024	Mali U23	6	(1)
- * Club domestic league appearances and goals as of 11 May 2026 ‡ National team caps and goals as of 30 July 2024

Thiemoko Diarra (born 19 April 2003) is a Malian professional footballer who plays as a left winger for Turkish Süper Lig club Kasımpaşa.

== Club career ==
Diarra started to play a football for Derby Académie.

In August 2021, Diarra joined to the French club Stade de Reims and played for the reserve team in the Championnat National 2. On 21 August 2021 made his debut in the 2–0 win against AS Beauvais Oise. in summer 2023 loaned for the Championnat National club LB Châteauroux.

On 5 September 2024, Diarra signed on one-year loan for the Israeli Premier League club Hapoel Haifa.

On 16 July 2026, Diarra joined Turkish Süper Lig club Kasımpaşa on a permanent transfer from Reims, signing after spending five years with the French club. He stated that the club's sporting project and ambitions were the main reasons behind his decision to move.

== International career ==
Diarra represented the Mali Olympics at the 2024 Summer Olympics.
