= Marcelo Fernández (footballer) =

Paraguayan footballer (born 2001)

Personal information
- Full name: Marcelo Fabián Fernández Benítez
- Date of birth: 25 October 2001 (age 25)
- Place of birth: Itá, Paraguay
- Height: 1.78 m (5 ft 10 in)
- Position: Forward

Team information
- Current team: Libertad
- Number: 28

Senior career*
Years	Team	Apps	(Gls)
2021–	Libertad	61	(5)
2022	→ Tacuary (loan)	37	(6)

International career
2023–	Paraguay Olympic	13	(4)
- * Club domestic league appearances and goals as of 12 August 2025

Marcelo Fabián Fernández Benítez (born 25 October 2001) is a Paraguayan footballer who plays as a forward for Club Libertad in the Paraguayan Primera División.

== Club career ==
Born in Itá in the Central department, Fernández came through the ranks of Club Libertad in the capital Asunción. He made his debut on 15 August 2021 in the Paraguayan Primera División, starting in a 3–3 home draw with Club 12 de Octubre de Santo Domingo.

At the start of 2022, Fernández was loaned to fellow top-flight team Tacuary. On 11 March he scored his first goal in a 2–0 win at Sportivo Ameliano, to give his club their first win of the season on the sixth matchday; he finished his spell with 37 games and 6 goals.

Fernández helped Libertad win the Copa Paraguay in 2023. He scored his first goal for them in a 3–0 third-round win at Club Sol de América, followed by the 2–1 winner at Club Sportivo San Lorenzo in the last 16, and opening a 3–0 home win over Deportivo Santaní in the quarter-finals. In the final on 2 December, he came on as a substitute as his team won on penalties against Sportivo Trinidense.

On 18 February 2024, Fernández scored his first league goal for Libertad, the winner off the bench in a 2–1 victory at Sol de América. In April, he was ruled out for a month with appendicitis.

== International career ==
Fernández was called up to the Paraguay national under-23 football team for the 2024 CONMEBOL Pre-Olympic Tournament in Venezuela. In the first two games, he scored in a 4–3 win over Uruguay, and the only goal against Peru, as his team qualified.

Fernández was chosen for the 2024 Olympic football event in France. In the second group game, he scored twice in a 4–2 win over Israel, followed by the only goal against Mali as his team made the quarter-finals.
