= Noam Ben Harush =

Israeli footballer

Noam Ben Harush נועם בן הרוש
Personal information
- Full name: Noam Ben Harsuh
- Date of birth: 13 May 2005 (age 21)
- Place of birth: Megadim, Israel
- Position: Right back

Team information
- Current team: Maccabi Tel Aviv
- Number: 21

Youth career
- 2015–2019: Maccabi Haifa
- 2019–2020: F.C. Neve Yosef
- 2020–2022: Beitar Tubruk
- 2022–2023: Hapoel Haifa

Senior career*
Years	Team	Apps	(Gls)
2023–2025	Hapoel Haifa	69	(2)
2025–	Maccabi Tel Aviv	23	(1)

International career^{‡}
2022	Israel U17	5	(0)
2022–2024	Israel U19	18	(0)
2023	Israel U20	3	(0)
2024–	Israel U21	2	(0)
Medal record
Representing Israel U-20
FIFA U-20 World Cup
Third place	2023 Argentina	Team
- * Club domestic league appearances and goals as of 1 June 2026 ‡ National team caps and goals as of 8 September 2024

Noam Ben Harush (Hebrew: נועם בן הרוש; born 13 May 2005) is an Israeli professional footballer who plays as a midfielder for Israeli Premier League club Maccabi Tel Aviv and both the Israel national under-19 team, Israel national under-20 team.

== Club career ==
Ben Harush made his senior debut for Hapoel Haifa in the 2–1 win against Hapoel Hadera. On 16 January 2024 scored his debut goal in the 2–0 win against Hapoel Hadera.

== Career statistics ==
=== Club ===
As of 18 May 2024.

Club	Season	League			State Cup		Toto Cup		Continental		Other		Total	
Club	Season	Division	Apps	Goals	Apps	Goals	Apps	Goals	Apps	Goals	Apps	Goals	Apps	Goals
Hapoel Haifa	2022–23	Israeli Premier League	3	0	0	0	0	0	–		0	0	3	0
Hapoel Haifa	2023–24	Israeli Premier League	31	2	2	0	5	0	–		0	0	38	2
Hapoel Haifa	2024–25	Israeli Premier League	31	0	2	0	3	0	–		0	0	36	0
Hapoel Haifa	Total		65	2	4	0	8	0	0	0	0	0	77	2
Maccabi Tel Aviv	2025–26	Israeli Premier League	0	0	0	0	0	0	–		0	0	0	0
Maccabi Tel Aviv	Total		0	0	0	0	0	0	0	0	0	0	0	0
Career total			65	2	4	0	8	0	0	0	0	0	77	2

== See also ==
- List of Jewish footballers
- List of Jews in sports
- List of Israelis
