= Haytam Manaout =

Moroccan footballer (born 2001)

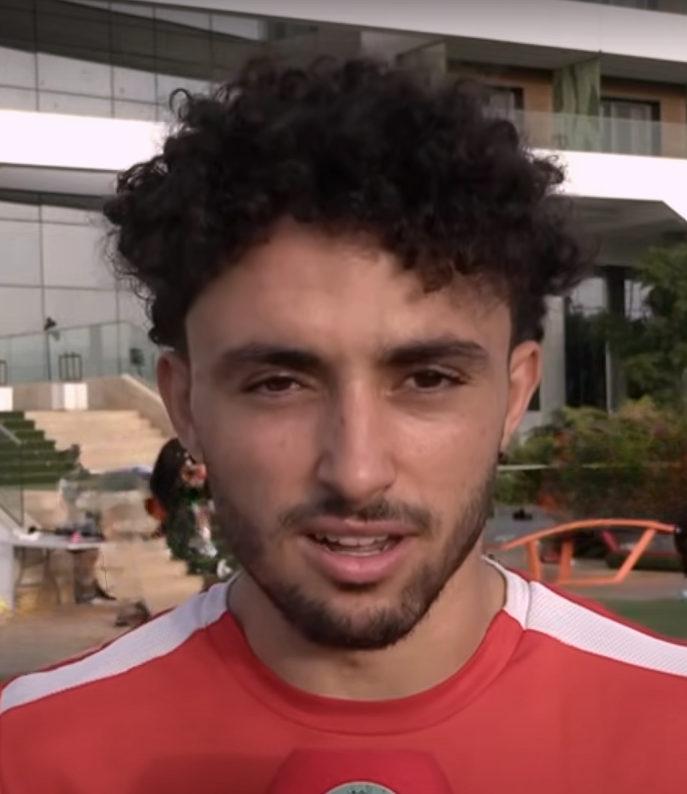
- Manaout in 2024

Personal information
- Date of birth: 18 April 2001 (age 25)
- Place of birth: El Jadida, Morocco
- Height: 1.82 m (6 ft 0 in)
- Position: Defender

Team information
- Current team: RS Berkane

Youth career
- –2021: Mohammed VI Football Academy

Senior career*
Years	Team	Apps	(Gls)
2021–2024	Union de Touarga	48	(0)
2024–	RS Berkane	2	(0)

International career
- Morocco U18
2018–2021	Morocco U20		
2023–	Morocco U23	3	(0)
Medal record
Representing Morocco
Olympic Games
Bronze medal – third place	2024 Paris	Team
- * Club domestic league appearances and goals as of 25 September 2024

Haytam Manaout (Arabic: هيثم منعوت; born 18 April 2001) is a Moroccan professional footballer who plays as a defender for RS Berkane.

== Early life and club career ==
Manaout was born on 18 April 2001 in El Jadida, Morocco. A defender, he began his career as a youth with the Mohammed VI Football Academy.

Manaout signed his first professional contract in August 2021 with Union de Touarga, then in Botola 2, the second level of Moroccan football. They were promoted to Botola, the first division, following the 2021–22 season. He debuted for the club on 7 October 2022, coming in as a substitute against Chabab Mohammédia, which Touarga won by a score of 1–0. He started for the first time nine days later against Hassania Agadir in a 2–1 win. His club finished eighth in the league standings, with Manaout appearing in a total of 23 matches during the 2022–23 season. The following season, he appeared in 25 games, with 24 of those being as a starter and one as a substitute.

In August 2024, Manaout signed a four-year contract to play for RS Berkane, concluding his tenure at Touarga having appeared in 48 matches. He made his debut for the club on 31 August 2024, starting in their 1–0 win against Raja CA.

== International career ==
Manaout was a member of the Morocco national under-18 football team. He was called up to the Morocco U20 team in November 2018 for two friendlies against the Mali U20s.

In March 2023, Manaout received his first callup to the national U23 team, playing in a 3–2 friendly loss to Ivory Coast after coming in for Omar El Hilali as a substitute in the 69th minute. He was called up again in March 2024 to take part in training camp. In July 2024, he was announced as one of 22 players for the Morocco U23 team at the 2024 Summer Olympics in Paris, France, being a reserve. After a loss to Spain in the semifinals, Manaout helped Morocco win the bronze medal match over Egypt by a score of 6–0.
