= Ayano Preda =

Israeli footballer (born 2002)

Ayano Preda איאנו פרדה
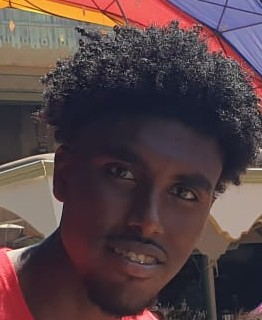
- Ayano Preda in 2023.

Personal information
- Date of birth: 29 April 2002 (age 24)
- Place of birth: Jerusalem, Israel
- Position: Defensive midfielder

Team information
- Current team: Hapoel Jerusalem
- Number: 21

Youth career
- 2014–2020: Hapoel Katamon
- 2020–2022: Hapoel Jerusalem

Senior career*
Years	Team	Apps	(Gls)
2022–	Hapoel Jerusalem	53	(2)

International career^{‡}
2023–	Israel U21	5	(0)
- * Club domestic league appearances and goals as of 24 June 2026 ‡ National team caps and goals as of 1 April 2024

Ayano Preda (Hebrew: איאנו פרדה; born 29 April 2002) is an Israeli professional footballer who plays as a defensive midfielder for Israeli Premier League club Hapoel Jerusalem.

== Club career ==
=== Hapoel Jerusalem ===
Preda started his football career in the Hapoel Jerusalem's children. On 15 March 2021 made his senior debut in the Israel State Cup match against Hapoel Kfar Shalem. On 3 September 2022 made his Israeli Premier League debut in the 3–0 win against F.C. Ashdod.

== International career ==
=== 2024 Summer Olympics ===
Preda was selected for Israel's squad to compete in the men's football at the 2024 Summer Olympics.

== Career statistics ==
=== Club ===
As of 1 June 2026

Club	Season	League			State Cup		Toto Cup		Continental		Other		Total	
Club	Season	Division	Apps	Goals	Apps	Goals	Apps	Goals	Apps	Goals	Apps	Goals	Apps	Goals
Hapoel Jerusalem	2020–21	Liga Leumit	0	0	1	0	0	0	0	0	0	0	1	0
Hapoel Jerusalem	2021–22	Israeli Premier League	0	0	0	0	0	0	0	0	0	0	0	0
Hapoel Jerusalem	2022–23	Israeli Premier League	10	0	0	0	4	0	0	0	0	0	14	0
Hapoel Jerusalem	2023–24	Israeli Premier League	26	1	2	1	3	0	0	0	0	0	31	2
Hapoel Jerusalem	2024–25	Israeli Premier League	16	1	1	0	4	0	0	0	0	0	21	1
Hapoel Jerusalem	2025–26	Israeli Premier League	1	0	0	0	0	0	0	0	0	0	1	0
Career total			53	2	4	1	11	0	0	0	0	0	68	2

== See also ==
- List of Israelis
