= Kevin Parzajuk =

Paraguayan footballer (born 2002)

Personal information
- Full name: Kevin Daniel Parzajuk Rodríguez
- Date of birth: 9 August 2002 (age 24)
- Place of birth: Fram, Paraguay
- Height: 1.90 m (6 ft 3 in)
- Position: Striker

Team information
- Current team: Montevideo Wanderers (on loan from Godoy Cruz)
- Number: 22

Youth career
- –2023: Olimpia
- 2020–2021: → Brescia (loan)

Senior career*
| Years | Team | Apps | (Gls) |
| 2022–2024 | Olimpia | 18 | (4) |
| 2023 | → Guaireña (loan) | 18 | (6) |
| 2025– | Godoy Cruz | 11 | (0) |
| 2025– | → Montevideo Wanderers (loan) | 8 | (0) |

International career^{‡}
| 2023– | Paraguay U23 | 13 | (0) |
- * Club domestic league appearances and goals as of 16:05, 8 October 2025 (UTC) ‡ National team caps and goals as of 30 July 2024

Kevin Daniel Parzajuk Rodríguez (born 9 August 2002) is a Paraguayan professional footballer who plays as a striker for Uruguayan Primera División club Montevideo Wanderers, on loan from Argentine Primera División club Godoy Cruz.

== Club career ==
Parzajuk started his career with Paraguayan side Olimpia.

On 22 September 2020 he joined Serie B side Brescia on loan.

In 2023, he was sent on loan to Paraguayan side Guaireña.

In January 2025, he moved to Argentine Primera División club Godoy Cruz.

== International career ==
Parzajuk has represented Paraguay internationally at youth level. He played for the Paraguay national under-23 football team at the 2024 CONMEBOL Pre-Olympic Tournament.

== Style of play ==
Parzajuk's main position is striker. He is known for his height.

== Personal life ==
Parzajuk was born in 2002 in Paraguay. He is of Polish descent.
