= Adi Yona =

Israeli footballer

Personal information
- Full name: Adi Menachem Yona
- Date of birth: 17 April 2004 (age 22)
- Place of birth: Jerusalem, Israel
- Position: Midfielder

Team information
- Current team: Beitar Jerusalem
- Number: 10

Youth career
- 2013–2023: Beitar Jerusalem

Senior career*
Years	Team	Apps	(Gls)
2022–	Beitar Jerusalem	111	(17)

International career^{‡}
2021	Israel U18	3	(0)
2022–2023	Israel U19	8	(0)
2023–	Israel U21	3	(1)
- * Club domestic league appearances and goals as of 23 June 2026 ‡ National team caps and goals as of 26 March 2024

Adi Menachem Yona (or Menahem, Hebrew: עדי מנחם יונה; born 17 April 2004) is an Israeli professional footballer who plays as a midfielder for Israeli Premier League club Beitar Jerusalem and the Israel national under-21 team.

== Early life ==
Yona was born and raised in Jerusalem, Israel, to an Israeli family of Jewish descent.

== Club career ==
He joined Israeli club Beitar Jerusalem's youth academy, when he was 9 years old.

On 19 December 2021 he made his senior debut against Hapoel Afula in the Israeli State Cup competition. On 3 April 2023 he scored his debut goal in the 2–0 win against Hapoel Haifa.

== Career statistics ==
=== Club ===
As of 1 June 2024.

Club	Season	League			State Cup		Toto Cup		Continental		Other		Total	
Club	Season	Division	Apps	Goals	Apps	Goals	Apps	Goals	Apps	Goals	Apps	Goals	Apps	Goals
Beitar Jerusalem	2021–22	Israeli Premier League	1	0	1	0	0	0	–		0	0	2	0
Beitar Jerusalem	2022–23	Israeli Premier League	24	1	5	0	4	0	–		0	0	33	1
Beitar Jerusalem	2023–24	Israeli Premier League	31	6	1	0	1	0	2	0	1	0	36	6
Beitar Jerusalem	2024–25	Israeli Premier League	0	0	0	0	0	0	0	0	0	0	0	0
Beitar Jerusalem	Total		56	7	7	0	5	0	2	0	1	0	71	7
Career total			56	7	7	0	5	0	2	0	1	0	71	7

== See also ==
- List of Jewish footballers
- List of Jews in sports
- List of Israelis
