= Marcelo Pérez (footballer, born 2001) =

Paraguayan footballer (born 2001)

Personal information
- Full name: Marcelo de la Cruz Pérez Mosqueira
- Date of birth: 23 March 2001 (age 25)
- Place of birth: Luque, Paraguay
- Height: 1.78 m (5 ft 10 in)
- Position: Striker

Team information
- Current team: Juventud (on loan from Huracán)
- Number: 19

Senior career*
Years	Team	Apps	(Gls)
2019–2023	Luqueño	41	(14)
2023–	Huracán	19	(0)
2025	→ Luqueño (loan)	31	(7)
2026–	→ Juventud (loan)	3	(0)

International career
2023–	Paraguay Olympic	9	(2)
- * Club domestic league appearances and goals as of 19 March 2026

Marcelo de la Cruz Pérez Mosqueira (born 23 March 2001) is a Paraguayan professional footballer who plays as a striker for Uruguayan Primera División club Juventud, on loan from Argentine Primera División club Huracán.

== Career ==
He started his career with Paraguayan side Luqueño. He was described as "the sensation of Paraguayan football". In 2023, he signed for Argentine side Huracán. In January 2025, he returned to Sportivo Luqueño on loan.

== Style of play ==
His main position is striker. He has been compared with France international Kylian Mbappe, according to his physical appearance.

== Personal life ==
He was born in 2001 in Paraguay. He is the nephew of Paraguayan footballer Amado Pérez.
