= Alexis Cantero =

Paraguayan footballer (born 2003)

Personal information
- Date of birth: 5 February 2003 (age 23)
- Place of birth: Asunción, Paraguay
- Height: 1.75 m (5 ft 9 in)
- Position: Left-back

Team information
- Current team: Olimpia

Youth career
- –2022: Guaraní

Senior career*
Years	Team	Apps	(Gls)
2022–2025	Guaraní	68	(1)
2025–	Olimpia	16	(0)
2026	→ Orenburg (loan)	7	(0)

International career^{‡}
2022–2023	Paraguay U20	17	(0)
2023–2024	Paraguay U23	14	(0)
- * Club domestic league appearances and goals as of 3 May 2026 ‡ National team caps and goals as of 2 August 2024

Alexis Cantero (born 5 February 2003) is a Paraguayan professional footballer who plays as a left-back for Olimpia.

== Early life ==
Cantero was born on 5 February 2003 in Asunción, Paraguay. Growing up, he attended Colegio Nacional Héroes de la Patria in Paraguay, where he studied economics.

== Club career ==
As a youth player, Cantero joined the youth academy of Paraguayan side Guaraní and was promoted to the club's senior team in 2022, where he played in the Copa Sudamericana and made sixty-eight league appearances and scored one goal.

Following his stint there, he signed for Paraguayan side Olimpia during the summer of 2025. Six months later, he was sent on loan with an option to buy to Russian side Orenburg. He left Orenburg as his loan expired.

== International career ==
Cantero represented Paraguay at the 2022 South American Games (which Paraguay won), 2023 South American U-20 Championship and the 2024 Summer Olympics (where Paraguay reached quarterfinals).

He was first called up to the senior Paraguay national team in June 2023 for a friendly against Nicaragua, but remained on the bench in that game.

== Career statistics ==
As of 3 May 2026

Club	Season	League			Cup		Continental		Total	
Club	Season	Division	Apps	Goals	Apps	Goals	Apps	Goals	Apps	Goals
Guaraní	2022	APF División de Honor	3	0	0	0	—		3	0
Guaraní	2023	APF División de Honor	12	0	0	0	4 (Note: Appearances in Copa Sudamericana)	1	16	1
Guaraní	2024	APF División de Honor	32	0	3	0	1	0	36	0
Guaraní	2025	APF División de Honor	21	1	0	0	7	0	28	1
Guaraní	Total		68	1	3	0	12	1	83	2
Olimpia	2025	APF División de Honor	16	0	—		—		16	0
Orenburg (loan)	2025–26	Russian Premier League	7	0	1	0	—		8	0
Career total			91	1	4	0	12	1	107	2
