= Daniel Rivas (footballer) =

Paraguayan footballer (born 2001)

Personal information
- Full name: Leonardo Daniel Rivas Conge
- Date of birth: December 6, 2001 (age 24)
- Place of birth: Paraguarí, Paraguay
- Height: 1.77 m (5 ft 10 in)
- Position: Left-back

Team information
- Current team: AVS
- Number: 12

Senior career*
Years	Team	Apps	(Gls)
2019–2023	Cerro Porteño	49	(1)
2024	Nacional	29	(1)
2025	Cerro Porteño	6	(0)
2025–	AVS	26	(0)

International career^{‡}
2024	Paraguay U23	12	(0)
- * Club domestic league appearances and goals as of 18 May 2026 ‡ National team caps and goals as of 18 July 2024

Leonardo Daniel Rivas Conge, known as Daniel Rivas (born December 6, 2001) is a Paraguayan professional footballer who plays as a left-back for Liga Portugal 2 club AVS.

== Club career ==
Daniel Rivas developed through the youth ranks of Club Cerro Porteño. He made his debut in the Paraguayan Primera División on July 13, 2019, in a 2–0 victory for Cerro Porteño against Deportivo Santaní. He won the Apertura 2020 and the Clausura 2021 with Cerro Porteño.

In 2024, he was loaned to Nacional for a season. In 2025, he returned to Cerro.

In July 2025, Rivas signed with AVS Futebol SAD of Primeira Liga, the first division of Portugal.

== International career ==
Rivas was part of the Paraguay U23 squad that won the 2024 South American Pre-Olympic Tournament held in Venezuela. He also played in all four of Paraguay's matches at the Paris 2024 Olympic Games.

In September 2024, he received his first call-up to the senior national team due to the injury of Santiago Arzamendia, to play in the 2026 FIFA World Cup qualification (CONMEBOL) against Uruguay and Brazil.

== Career statistics ==
=== Club ===
As of 30 August 2025

Season	Club	League			National cup		Continental		Total	
Season	Club	Division	Apps	Goals	Apps	Goals	Apps	Goals	Apps	Goals
Club Cerro Porteño	2019	Paraguayan Primera División	7	0	0	0	0	0	7	0
Club Cerro Porteño	2020	Paraguayan Primera División	3	0	—		—		3	0
Club Cerro Porteño	2021	Paraguayan Primera División	9	0	—		0	0	9	0
Club Cerro Porteño	2022	Paraguayan Primera División	15	0	—		6 (Note: Appearances in Copa Libertadores)	0	21	0
Club Cerro Porteño	2023	Paraguayan Primera División	15	1	—		5	0	20	1
Club Cerro Porteño	Total		49	1	0	0	11	0	60	1
Nacional	2024	Paraguayan Primera División	29	1	0	0	11 (Note: Five appearances and one goal in Copa Libertadores, six appearances in Copa Sudamericana)	1	40	2
Club Cerro Porteño	2025	Paraguayan Primera División	6	0	0	0	3	0	9	0
AVS Futebol SAD	2025–26	Primeira Liga	2	0	0	0	—		2	0
Career total			86	2	0	0	25	1	111	3

== Honours ==
=== Club ===
- Winner of the Paraguayan Primera División (2): 2020 (Apertura), 2021 (Clausura).
- Runner-up of the Paraguayan Primera División (5): 2019 (Apertura), 2022 (Apertura & Clausura), 2023 (Apertura & Clausura).
- Runner-up of the Copa Paraguay (1): 2024.
- Runner-up of the Supercopa Paraguay (1): 2021.

=== International ===
- Winner of the 2024 CONMEBOL Pre-Olympic Tournament (1): 2024.
