= Marcos Gómez =

Paraguayan footballer

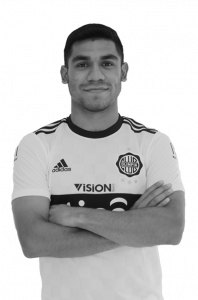
- Gómez with Olimpia in 2022

Personal information
- Full name: Marcos Ezequiel Gómez Paredes
- Date of birth: 10 November 2001 (age 25)
- Place of birth: Asunción, Paraguay
- Height: 1.74 m (5 ft 9 in)
- Position: Midfielder

Team information
- Current team: Olimpia

Youth career
- 2015–2021: Olimpia

Senior career*
Years	Team	Apps	(Gls)
2021–	Olimpia	99	(1)
2025	→ Deportes Iquique (loan)	14	(0)

International career^{‡}
2023–	Paraguay U23	7	(0)
- * Club domestic league appearances and goals as of 26 December 2025 ‡ National team caps and goals as of 30 July 2024

Marcos Ezequiel Gómez Paredes (born 10 November 2001) is a Paraguayan professional footballer who plays as midfielder for Paraguayan Primera División club Olimpia.

== Career ==
Gómez took his first steps in the youth ranks of his current club, where he made his debut with the main squad on May 23, 2021. He is currently positioned as one of the team's starters, where he had outstanding performances to help his team qualify for the group stage of the Copa Libertadores, which earned him coach Guillermo Barros Schelotto to call him up to be part of the Albirroja squad in the team's last two matches for the South American Qualifiers for the 2022 World Cup in Qatar. In July 2025, he was loaned out to Chilean Primera División club Deportes Iquique.

== Honors ==
Olimpia

- Primera División: 2022 Clausura
