= Fernando Román (footballer, born 2001) =

Paraguayan footballer

Personal information
- Full name: Fernando José Román Torales
- Date of birth: 23 February 2001 (age 25)
- Place of birth: Capiatá, Paraguay
- Height: 1.89 m (6 ft 2 in)
- Position: Defender

Team information
- Current team: Guaraní
- Number: 27

Youth career
- Guaraní

Senior career*
Years	Team	Apps	(Gls)
2021–	Guaraní	74	(1)

International career
2023–	Paraguay U23	11	(1)
- * Club domestic league appearances and goals as of 12 August 2025

Fernando José Román Torales (born 23 February 2001) is a Paraguayan footballer who plays as a defender for Guaraní.

== Club career ==
Born in Capiatá in the Central department, Román began playing as a left back before being moved to the right side of defence. He made his professional debut for Club Guaraní in the Paraguayan Primera División on 18 September 2021, as a substitute for the last eight minutes of a goalless draw at Cerro Porteño. He scored his first goal on 6 November 2022, a header to open a 2–1 home win over Tacuary and qualify his team to the Copa Sudamericana. In September 2023, he played in central defence due to the suspension of José Moya.

== International career ==
Román made his debut for the Paraguay national under-23 football team on 18 December 2023, in a 2–1 friendly win over Panama. He was part of the team that won the 2024 CONMEBOL Pre-Olympic Tournament in Venezuela, qualifying the team to the 2024 Olympic tournament. He scored his first goal for the team on 23 March 2024 in a 2–0 friendly win over the Dominican Republic. After this victory, he, Wilder Viera and Javier Talavera were given the title Beloved Sons of Capiatá. He was chosen for the Olympics in France.
