= Julio Enciso (footballer, born 2004) =

Paraguayan footballer (born 2004)

- Enciso with Paraguay in 2026

Personal information
- Full name: Julio César Enciso Espínola
- Date of birth: 23 January 2004 (age 22)
- Place of birth: Caaguazú, Paraguay
- Height: 1.73 m (5 ft 8 in)
- Positions: Attacking midfielder; striker

Team information
- Current team: Ipswich Town
- Number: 10

Youth career
- 2015–2019: Libertad

Senior career*
Years	Team	Apps	(Gls)
2019–2022	Libertad	55	(18)
2022–2025	Brighton & Hove Albion	44	(4)
2025	→ Ipswich Town (loan)	13	(2)
2025–2026	Strasbourg	27	(3)
2026–	Ipswich Town	9	(2)

International career^{‡}
2019	Paraguay U15		
2024	Paraguay Olympic	5	(1)
2021–	Paraguay	40	(6)
- * Club domestic league appearances and goals as of 02:13, 31 October 2026 (UTC) ‡ National team caps and goals as of 22:15, 13 November 2026 (UTC)

Julio César Enciso Espínola (born 23 January 2004) is a Paraguayan professional footballer who plays as an attacking midfielder or striker for Premier League club Ipswich Town and the Paraguay national team.

== Club career ==
=== Early career ===
Enciso started playing football at his local club in Caaguazú, Paraguay. At age 12 he was recruited by Libertad. Enciso made his senior debut for Club Libertad on 17 March 2019, aged 15, in a 4–0 home victory against Deportivo Santaní. He became the youngest player to debut with Libertad.

=== Brighton and Hove Albion ===
On 17 June 2022, Enciso transferred to Premier League club Brighton & Hove Albion for a transfer fee of £9.5 million plus future add-on fees, signing an initial four-year contract. He made his Brighton debut on 24 August, playing 80 minutes of the 3–0 away win over League One side Forest Green Rovers in the EFL Cup second round, where he claimed assist to Steven Alzate's long range goal.

Enciso made his Premier League debut on 29 October, coming on as a 65th minute substitute for Adam Lallana in Brighton's 4–1 home win over Chelsea. He scored his first goal for the club on 4 April 2023, in a 2–0 away win at Bournemouth. Nearly two weeks later, he scored in a 1–2 away win over Chelsea, helping the Albion secure a victory at Stamford Bridge for the first time in their history.

Enciso started in the FA Cup semi-final at Wembley on 23 April, playing 67 minutes as Brighton eventually lost 7–6 on penalties to Manchester United. Three days later, the 19-year-old made his first Premier League start for the Albion, in the 3–1 away loss at Nottingham Forest. Three days after that on 29 April, he made two assists in Brighton's 6–0 home victory over the Wolves, Brighton's biggest Premier League victory.

On 14 May, Enciso opened the scoreline with a header from a Pervis Estupiñán cross in an eventual 3–0 away win at Arsenal. He scored his first goal at Falmer Stadium on 24 May, scoring a 25-yard goal against Manchester City, with Brighton sealing a place in the 2023–24 UEFA Europa League. The goal was chosen as BBC Goal of the Season for 2022–23 and later chosen as Premier League Goal of the Season, beating out the likes of Brentford's Ivan Toney and Newcastle's Miguel Almirón in a vote decided by a panel of experts as well as the public's opinion. Enciso also went on win the Goal of the Season at Brighton's end of season awards.

On 19 August 2023, Enciso set up both of Solly March's goals in a 4–1 away win at Wolverhampton Wanderers, Brighton's second match of the 2023–24 season. However, the following week, the striker suffered a knee issue and was subsequently ruled out for "a long period", according to manager Roberto De Zerbi.

==== Loan to Ipswich Town ====
On 23 January 2025, Enciso joined fellow Premier League club Ipswich Town on loan for the remainder of the 2024–25 season. He made his debut against Liverpool in a 4–1 loss, coming on as a substitute.

=== Strasbourg ===
On 1 September 2025, Enciso joined Ligue 1 club Strasbourg on a deal worth £17 million, with Brighton retaining a sell-on clause.

=== Return to Ipswich Town ===
On 17 August 2026, Enciso re-signed for Ipswich Town on an undisclosed fee, signing a five-year contract.

== International career ==
Enciso is a Paraguayan youth international, having played with the Paraguay U15 side at the 2019 South American U-15 Championship. He first represented the senior Paraguay national team in a 3–1 2021 Copa América win over Bolivia on 14 June 2021.

Enciso was selected in Paraguay's 26 player roster for the 2026 FIFA World Cup in June 2026. He scored a goal in the round of 32 match against Germany, which Paraguay ended up winning 4–3 on penalties.

== Player profile ==
"Julio [Enciso] is a highly talented footballer. His speed, energy and ability to break lines are qualities that we need."

— Liam Rosenior, Enciso's manager at Racing Strasbourg (23 October 2025).

Enciso plays as a central forward and is right-footed. Agile in his movements, with a good sense of goal, a precise shot from mid-range, and skill in dribbling. In addition to his main position as a central forward, he can also play on the wings as an attacker or in a more central role, such as an attacking midfielder or false 9. In an interview with Infobae, Enciso expressed his willingness to occupy different positions within the team and his ability to adapt to the coach's requirements.

In another interview, Enciso mentioned that he drew inspiration from his compatriot Óscar Cardozo, with whom he shared a team at Club Libertad. He also spoke about his admiration for Ronaldinho, whom he considers his idol, and his attentive observation of Cristiano Ronaldo's plays.

In 2021, Enciso was included in the list of the top sixty footballers born in 2004, compiled by the British newspaper The Guardian. In June 2023, he was nominated for the Golden Boy Award, given annually by the Italian newspaper Tuttosport, ranking 48th among the 100 candidates. Both Enciso and Argentine Alejandro Garnacho were the only South American representatives selected for this recognition.

On 17 July 2024, Enciso was recognised as the second-best U-21 player in the world in terms of creativity and effectiveness in finishing plays, second only to French player Rayan Cherki. This recognition comes from an analysis by the Centre International d'Etude du Sport (CIES) and was shared through X. Enciso scored 78.7 out of 100, standing out for his ability to create goal-scoring opportunities and take shots on target, although the analysis did not evaluate the accuracy of his shots.

== Career statistics ==
=== Club ===
As of match played 31 October 2026

Appearances and goals by club, season and competition
Club	Season	League			National cup (Note: Includes Copa Paraguay, FA Cup, Coupe de France)		League cup (Note: Includes EFL Cup)		Continental		Total	
Club	Season	Division	Apps	Goals	Apps	Goals	Apps	Goals	Apps	Goals	Apps	Goals
Libertad	2019	Paraguayan Primera División	3	0	2	0	—		0	0	5	0
Libertad	2020	Paraguayan Primera División	8	1	0	0	—		2 (Note: Appearances in Copa Libertadores)	1	10	2
Libertad	2021	Paraguayan Primera División	30	6	3	4	—		9 (Note: Two appearances and one goal in Copa Libertadores, seven appearances and one goal in Copa Sudamericana)	2	42	12
Libertad	2022	Paraguayan Primera División	14	11	0	0	—		3	0	17	11
Libertad	Total		55	18	5	4	—		14	3	74	25
Brighton & Hove Albion	2022–23	Premier League	20	4	3	0	3	0	—		26	4
Brighton & Hove Albion	2023–24	Premier League	12	0	1	0	0	0	2 (Note: Appearances in UEFA Europa League)	0	15	0
Brighton & Hove Albion	2024–25	Premier League	12	0	1	1	3	0	—		16	1
Brighton & Hove Albion	Total		44	4	5	1	6	0	2	0	57	5
Ipswich Town (loan)	2024–25	Premier League	13	2	—		—		—		13	2
Strasbourg	2025–26	Ligue 1	27	3	5	6	—		10 (Note: Appearances in UEFA Conference League)	3	42	12
Ipswich Town	2026–27	Premier League	9	2	0	0	0	0	—		9	2
Career total			146	29	15	11	6	0	26	6	193	46

=== International ===
As of match played 13 November 2026

Appearances and goals by national team and year
National team	Year	Apps	Goals
Paraguay	2021	2	0
Paraguay	2022	7	0
Paraguay	2023	2	0
Paraguay	2024	12	2
Paraguay	2025	6	2
Paraguay	2026	11	2
Total		40	6

Scores and results list Paraguay's goal tally first.

List of international goals scored by Julio Enciso
No.	Date	Venue	Cap	Opponent	Score	Result	Competition
1	24 June 2024	NRG Stadium, Houston, United States	15	Colombia	1–2	1–2	2024 Copa América
2	19 November 2024	El Alto Municipal Stadium, El Alto, Bolivia	23	Bolivia	2–2	2–2	2026 FIFA World Cup qualification
3	25 March 2025	Estadio Metropolitano Roberto Meléndez, Barranquilla, Colombia	25	Colombia	2–2	2–2	2026 FIFA World Cup qualification
4	5 June 2025	Estadio Defensores del Chaco, Asunción, Paraguay	26	Uruguay	2–0	2–0	2026 FIFA World Cup qualification
5	29 June 2026	Gillette Stadium, Foxborough, United States	36	Germany	1–0	1–1 (a.e.t.) (4–3 p)	2026 FIFA World Cup
6	13 November 2026	National Stadium, Kallang, Singapore	40	Singapore	4–1	4–1	Friendly

== Honours ==
Libertad

- División Profesional: 2021 Apertura, 2022 Apertura

Individual

- BBC Goal of the Season: 2022–23
- Premier League Goal of the Season: 2022–23
- Brighton & Hove Albion Goal of the Season: 2022–23
- FIFA Puskás Award Nominee: 2023

Records

- Youngest player to score a goal on his debut in the Copa Libertadores (16 years and 307 days).
- Youngest player to score in the Copa Libertadores in the 21st century (16 years and 307 days).
- First Paraguayan footballer nominated for the Golden Boy Award.
- First Paraguayan footballer nominated for the Puskás Award, also the first as a finalist for the award.
- Fourth youngest footballer in history to debut for the Paraguay national team (17 years, 1 month, and 18 days).
- First Paraguayan footballer chosen as the Goal of the Season by BBC Sport, as well as the Premier League Goal of the Season.
- Second youngest player in history to score against Arsenal in their own stadium (19 years and 111 days).
