= Paraguay national under-23 football team =

Paraguay Olympic
- Nickname: La Albirroja
- Association: Asociación Paraguaya de Fútbol (APF)
- Confederation: CONMEBOL (South America)
- Head coach: Carlos Jara Saguier
- Top scorer: José Cardozo (7)
- Home stadium: Estadio Defensores del Chaco
- FIFA code: PAR
First colours	Second colours

Olympic Games
- Appearances: 3 (first in 1992)
- Best result: Silver medalists (2004)

Pan American Games
- Appearances: 5 (first in 1951)
- Best result: Group stage (2003, 2015)
Medal record
Olympic Games
Silver medal – second place	2004 Athens	Team

The Paraguay national under-23 football team, also known as the Paraguay Olympic football team, represents Paraguay in international football competitions in Olympic Games and Pan American Games. The team is governed by the Paraguayan Football Association and is limited to players under the age of 23, except three overage players, ostensibly possessing veteran experience and expertise, in accordance with FIFA regulations.

== Competitive record ==
=== Olympic Games ===
Olympic Games record
Year	Host	Round	Pos.	Pld	W	D	L	GF	GA
1992	(Spain) Barcelona	Quarter-finals	8th	4	1	2	1	5	5
1996	(United States) Atlanta	Did not qualify							
2000	(Australia) Sydney	Did not qualify							
2004	(Greece) Athens	Silver medal	2nd	6	4	0	2	12	9
2008	(China) Beijing	Did not qualify							
2012	(United Kingdom) London	Did not qualify							
2016	(Brazil) Rio de Janeiro	Did not qualify							
2020	(Japan) Tokyo	Did not qualify							
2024	(France) Paris	Quarter-finals	6th	4	2	1	1	6	8
Total		1 Silver medal	3/9	14	7	3	4	23	22

=== CONMEBOL Pre-Olympic Tournament ===
CONMEBOL Pre-Olympic Tournament record
Year	Host	Round	Pld	W	D	L	GF	GA
1992	Paraguay	Champions	7	4	2	1	10	2
1996	Argentina	Group stage	4	1	0	3	8	12
2000	Brazil	Group stage	4	1	0	3	7	9
2004	Chile	Runners-up	8	4	1	3	11	11
2020	Colombia	Group stage	4	1	0	3	5	6
2024	Venezuela	Champions	7	4	2	1	13	9
Total		2 titles	34	15	5	14	54	49

=== Pan American Games ===
Pan American Games record
Year	Host	Round	Pos.	Pld	W	D	L	GF	GA
Until 1995	See Paraguay national football team								
1999	(Canada) Winnipeg	Did not participate							
2003	(Dominican Republic) Santo Domingo	Group stage	5th	3	1	0	2	3	4
2007	(Brazil) Rio de Janeiro	Did not qualify							
2011	(Mexico) Guadalajara	Did not qualify							
2015	(Canada) Toronto	Group stage	5th	3	1	1	1	6	3
2019	(Peru) Lima	Did not qualify							
2023	(Chile) Santiago	Did not qualify							
Total		Group stage	2/7	6	2	1	3	9	7

== Honours ==
- Summer Olympics:
  - (silver) Silver medalists (1): 2004
- CONMEBOL Pre-Olympic Tournament
  - Champions (2): 1992, 2024
  - Runners-up (1): 2004
  - Third place (1): 1984
- South American Games:
  - (gold) Gold medalists (2): 1978, 2022

== Results and fixtures ==
The following is a list of match results in the last 12 months, as well as any future matches that have been scheduled.

Win Draw Loss

== Players ==
=== Current squad ===
The following players were called up for the 2024 Olympic Games.

Head coach: Carlos Jara Saguier

No.	Pos.	Player	Date of birth (age)	Club
1	GK	Roberto Fernández	29 March 1988 (aged 36)	(Brazilian Football Confederation) Botafogo
12	GK	Rodrigo Frutos	6 January 2003 (aged 21)	(Paraguayan Football Association) Olimpia
14	DF	Fabián Balbuena	23 August 1991 (aged 32)	(Russian Football Union) Dynamo Moscow
13	DF	Alexis Cantero	5 February 2003 (aged 21)	(Paraguayan Football Association) Guaraní
3	DF	Ronaldo Dejesús	21 April 2001 (aged 23)	(Paraguayan Football Association) Cerro Porteño
5	DF	Gilberto Flores	1 April 2003 (aged 21)	(Paraguayan Football Association) Sportivo Trinidense
2	DF	Alan Núñez	1 October 2004 (aged 19)	(Paraguayan Football Association) Cerro Porteño
4	DF	Daniel Rivas	6 December 2001 (aged 22)	(Paraguayan Football Association) Nacional
16	DF	Fernando Román	23 February 2001 (aged 23)	(Paraguayan Football Association) Guaraní
8	MF	Diego Gómez	27 March 2003 (aged 21)	(United States Soccer Federation) Inter Miami
6	MF	Marcos Gómez	10 November 2001 (aged 22)	(Paraguayan Football Association) Olimpia
10	MF	Wilder Viera	4 March 2002 (aged 22)	(Paraguayan Football Association) Cerro Porteño
17	MF	Gustavo Caballero	21 September 2001 (aged 22)	(Paraguayan Football Association) Nacional
20	MF	Ángel Cardozo Lucena	19 October 1994 (aged 29)	(Paraguayan Football Association) Libertad
7	FW	Marcelo Fernández	25 October 2001 (aged 22)	(Paraguayan Football Association) Libertad
9	FW	Kevin Parzajuk	9 August 2002 (aged 21)	(Paraguayan Football Association) Olimpia
18	FW	Marcelo Pérez	23 March 2001 (aged 23)	(Argentine Football Association) Huracán
15	FW	Julio Enciso	23 January 2004 (aged 20)	(The Football Association) Brighton & Hove Albion

=== Alternates ===
No.	Pos.	Player	Date of birth (age)	Club
	GK	Facundo Insfrán	4 May 2006 (aged 18)	(Paraguayan Football Association) Olimpia
	MF	Rubén Lezcano	9 February 2004 (aged 20)	(Paraguayan Football Association) Libertad
	MF	Enso González	20 January 2005 (aged 19)	(The Football Association) Wolverhampton Wanderers
	FW	Tiago Caballero	27 May 2005 (aged 19)	(Paraguayan Football Association) Nacional
	FW	Diego González	7 January 2003 (aged 21)	(Italian Football Federation) Lazio

=== Recent call-ups ===
The following players have received a call-up within the past 12 months:

No.	Pos.	Player	Date of birth (age)	Club
	GK	Ángel González	4 February 2003 (aged 21)	(Paraguayan Football Association) Libertad
	GK	Javier Talavera	12 August 2003 (aged 20)	(Paraguayan Football Association) Cerro Porteño
	DF	Victor Cabañas	13 February 2003 (aged 21)	(Paraguayan Football Association) Cerro Porteño
	DF	Gastón Benítez	21 May 2002 (aged 22)	(Paraguayan Football Association) Sol de América
	MF	Fernando Cardozo	8 February 2001 (aged 23)	(Paraguayan Football Association) Olimpia
	MF	Ariel Gamarra	26 February 2003 (aged 21)	(Argentine Football Association) Argentinos Juniors
	MF	Juan José Cardozo	24 February 2004 (aged 20)	(Argentine Football Association) Argentinos Juniors
	MF	Nelson Gauto		(Paraguayan Football Association) 2 de Mayo
	MF	Juan Salcedo	12 August 2003 (aged 20)	(Paraguayan Football Association) Sportivo Trinidense
	MF	Jesús Llano		(Paraguayan Football Association) 2 de Mayo
	MF	Diego Fernández		(Paraguayan Football Association) Sportivo Luqueño
	MF	Rodrigo Villalba		(Paraguayan Football Association) Libertad
	MF	Iván Leguizamón	3 July 2002 (aged 22)	(Argentine Football Association) San Lorenzo
	MF	Fabrizio Peralta	2 August 2002 (aged 21)	(Brazilian Football Confederation) Cruzeiro
	FW	Diego Duarte	8 April 2002 (aged 22)	(Paraguayan Football Association) Nacional

=== Notable players ===
- Carlos Gamarra
- José Saturnino Cardozo
- Édgar Barreto

=== Overage players in Olympic Games ===
Tournament	Player 1	Player 2	Player 3
2004	Carlos Gamarra (aged 33)	Julio César Enciso (aged 30)	José Cardozo (aged 33)
2024	Gatito Fernández (aged 36)	Fabián Balbuena (aged 32)	Ángel Cardozo Lucena (aged 29)

== Former squads ==
- 1992 Summer Olympics squads - Paraguay
- 2004 CONMEBOL Men Pre-Olympic Tournament squads - Paraguay
- 2004 Summer Olympics squads - Paraguay

== See also ==
- Paraguay national football team
- Paraguay national under-20 football team
- Paraguay national under-17 football team
