= Football at the 2024 Summer Olympics – Men's tournament – Group C =

Group C of the men's football tournament at the 2024 Summer Olympics was played from 24 to 30 July 2024. The group consisted of the Dominican Republic, Egypt, Spain and Uzbekistan. The top two teams, Egypt and Spain, advanced to the knockout stage.

== Teams ==
Draw position	Team	Pot	Confederation	Method of qualification	Date of qualification	Olympic appearance	Last appearance	Previous best performance
C1	Uzbekistan (Note: The qualifiers from AFC were not known at the time of the draw.)	1	AFC	2024 AFC U-23 Asian Cup top three	29 April 2024	1st	Debut	
C2	Spain	2	UEFA	2023 UEFA European Under-21 Championship top three	2 July 2023	12th	2020	Gold medalists (1992)
C3	Egypt	3	CAF	2023 U-23 Africa Cup of Nations top three	4 July 2023	13th	2020	Fourth place (1928, 1964)
C4	Dominican Republic	4	CONCACAF	2022 CONCACAF U-20 Championship top two	1 July 2022	1st	Debut	

== Standings ==
Pos	Team	Pld	W	D	L	GF	GA	GD	Pts	Qualification
1	Egypt	3	2	1	0	3	1	+2	7	Advance to knockout stage
2	Spain	3	2	0	1	6	4	+2	6	Advance to knockout stage
3	Dominican Republic	3	0	2	1	2	4	−2	2	
4	Uzbekistan	3	0	1	2	2	4	−2	1	

Source: FIFA
Rules for classification: Group stage tiebreakers

In the quarter-finals:

- The winners of Group C, Egypt, advanced to play the runners-up of Group D, Paraguay.
- The runners-up of Group C, Spain, advanced to play the winners of Group D, Japan.

== Matches ==
=== Uzbekistan vs Spain ===
24 July 2024
15:00

Uzbekistan	1–2	Spain
Shomurodov 45+3' (pen.)	Report	Pubill 28'; Gómez 62'

Parc des Princes, Paris
Attendance: 33,732
Referee: Dahane Beida (Mauritania)

Uzbekistan	Spain

GK	1	Abduvohid Nematov
RB	4	Husniddin Aliqulov
CB	3	Abdukodir Khusanov
CB	5	Mukhammadkodir Khamraliev
LB	6	Ibrokhimkhalil Yuldoshev
DM	18	Abdurauf Buriev	(yellow card) 61'	(substituted off) 67'
DM	15	Umarali Rakhmonaliev
AM	7	Abbosbek Fayzullaev
AM	10	Jasurbek Jaloliddinov	(yellow card) 36'	(substituted off) 67'
SS	11	Oston Urunov		(substituted off) 59'
CF	14	Eldor Shomurodov (c)		(substituted off) 79'
Substitutes:
GK	12	Vladimir Nazarov
DF	2	Saidazamat Mirsaidov
DF	13	Zafarmurod Abdurakhmatov
MF	17	Diyor Kholmatov	(yellow card) 68'	(substituted on) 67'
MF	19	Ibrokhim Ibragimov		(substituted on) 79'
FW	8	Ruslanbek Jiyanov		(substituted on) 67'
FW	9	Khusayin Norchaev		(substituted on) 59'
Manager:
Timur Kapadze

GK	1	Arnau Tenas
RB	2	Marc Pubill	(yellow card) 37'
CB	5	Pau Cubarsí	(yellow card) 7'	(substituted off) 46'
CB	4	Eric García
LB	3	Juan Miranda
CM	11	Fermín López		(substituted off) 76'
CM	6	Pablo Barrios
RW	14	Aimar Oroz		(substituted off) 76'
AM	10	Álex Baena		(substituted off) 87'
LW	17	Sergio Gómez
CF	9	Abel Ruiz (c)	(yellow card) 82'	(substituted off) 87'
Substitutes:
GK	13	Joan García
DF	12	Jon Pacheco		(substituted on) 46'
DF	15	Miguel Gutiérrez
MF	8	Beñat Turrientes		(substituted on) 87'
MF	16	Adrián Bernabé	(yellow card) 80'	(substituted on) 76'
FW	7	Diego López		(substituted on) 76'
FW	18	Samu Aghehowa	(yellow card) 90+8'	(substituted on) 87'
Manager:
Santi Denia

Assistant referees:
Jerson Emiliano dos Santos (Angola)
Stephen Yiembe (Kenya)
Fourth official:
Drew Fischer (Canada)
Video assistant referee:
Lahlou Benbraham (Algeria)
Assistant video assistant referee:
Tatiana Guzmán (Nicaragua)

=== Egypt vs Dominican Republic ===
24 July 2024
17:00

Egypt	0–0	Dominican Republic
	Report

Stade de la Beaujoire, Nantes
Attendance: 13,945
Referee: Yoshimi Yamashita (Japan)

Egypt	Dominican Republic

GK	1	Hamza Alaa
RB	4	Ahmed Eid
CB	5	Hossam Abdelmaguid
CB	2	Omar Fayed	(yellow card) 68'
LB	13	Karim El Debes		(substituted off) 87'
DM	17	Mohamed Elneny (c)
CM	6	Mohamed Shehata
CM	3	Ahmed Atef		(substituted off) 87'
RF	14	Ahmed Sayed
CF	9	Osama Faisal		(substituted off) 77'
LF	10	Ibrahim Adel		(substituted off) 86'
Substitutes:
GK	16	Ali El Gabry
DF	15	Mohamed Tarek
MF	8	Ziad Kamal		(substituted on) 87'
MF	11	Mostafa Saad		(substituted on) 86'
MF	19	Mohamed Hamdy		(substituted on) 87'
FW	18	Bilal Mazhar		(substituted on) 77'
Manager:
(Brazil) Rogério Micale

GK	1	Xavier Valdez
CB	4	Edgar Pujol
CB	12	Joao Urbáez
CB	5	Luiyi de Lucas
RM	2	Francisco Marizán
CM	15	Fabian Messina	(yellow card) 44'	(substituted off) 76'
CM	6	Heinz Mörschel
LM	9	Rafael Núñez		(substituted off) 90+3'
RF	11	Peter González		(substituted off) 77'
CF	18	Nowend Lorenzo (c)		(substituted off) 77'
LF	7	Oscar Ureña		(substituted off) 77'
Substitutes:
GK	13	Enrique Bösl
DF	16	Nelson Lemaire		(substituted on) 90+3'
MF	3	Josué Báez	(yellow card) 85'	(substituted on) 77'
MF	8	Ángel Montes de Oca
MF	10	Edison Azcona		(substituted on) 77'
MF	14	Omar de la Cruz		(substituted on) 76'
FW	17	José de León		(substituted on) 77'
Manager:
(Spain) Ibai Gómez

Assistant referees:
Makoto Bozono (Japan)
Naomi Teshirogi (Japan)
Fourth official:
Odette Hamilton (Jamaica)
Video assistant referee:
Sivakorn Pu-udom (Thailand)
Assistant video assistant referee:
Héctor Paletta (Argentina)

=== Dominican Republic vs Spain ===
27 July 2024
15:00

Dominican Republic	1–3	Spain
Montes de Oca 38'	Report	López 24'; Baena 55'; Gutiérrez 70'

Stade de Bordeaux, Bordeaux
Attendance: 16,099
Referee: Adel Al-Naqbi (United Arab Emirates)

Dominican Republic	Spain

GK	13	Enrique Bösl
CB	4	Edgar Pujol
CB	5	Luiyi de Lucas
CB	12	Joao Urbáez
RM	2	Francisco Marizán		(substituted off) 79'
CM	14	Omar de la Cruz		(substituted off) 60'
CM	6	Heinz Mörschel		(substituted off) 90'
CM	8	Ángel Montes de Oca
LM	16	Nelson Lemaire		(substituted off) 60'
CF	18	Nowend Lorenzo		(substituted off) 46'
CF	10	Edison Azcona (c)	(red card) 45+1'
Substitutes:
GK	1	Xavier Valdez
DF	20	Thomas Jungbauer
MF	3	Josué Báez		(substituted on) 90'
FW	7	Oscar Ureña		(substituted on) 60'
FW	9	Rafael Núñez		(substituted on) 60'
FW	11	Peter González		(substituted on) 46'
FW	17	José de León		(substituted on) 79'
Manager:
(Spain) Ibai Gómez

GK	1	Arnau Tenas
RB	20	Juanlu Sánchez
CB	4	Eric García
CB	5	Pau Cubarsí	(yellow card) 45+1'	(substituted off) 66'
LB	3	Juan Miranda		(substituted off) 66'
DM	6	Pablo Barrios		(substituted off) 66'
CM	11	Fermín López		(substituted off) 77'
CM	10	Álex Baena		(substituted off) 78'
RF	14	Aimar Oroz
CF	9	Abel Ruiz (c)
LF	17	Sergio Gómez
Substitutes:
GK	13	Joan García
DF	12	Jon Pacheco	(yellow card) 90+3'	(substituted on) 66'
DF	15	Miguel Gutiérrez		(substituted on) 66'
MF	8	Beñat Turrientes		(substituted on) 77'
MF	16	Adrián Bernabé		(substituted on) 66'
FW	7	Diego López		(substituted on) 78'
FW	18	Samu Aghehowa
Manager:
Santi Denia

Assistant referees:
Ahmed Al-Rashadi (United Arab Emirates)
Sabet Obaid Suroor Al-Ali (United Arab Emirates)
Fourth official:
Jelena Cvetković (Serbia)
Video assistant referee:
Sivakorn Pu-udom (Thailand)
Assistant video assistant referee:
Khamis Al-Marri (Qatar)

=== Uzbekistan vs Egypt ===
27 July 2024
17:00

Uzbekistan	0–1	Egypt
	Report	Koka 11'

Stade de la Beaujoire, Nantes
Attendance: 20,658
Referee: Campbell-Kirk Kawana-Waugh (New Zealand)

Uzbekistan	Egypt

GK	1	Abduvohid Nematov
RB	4	Husniddin Aliqulov
CB	3	Abdukodir Khusanov
CB	18	Abdurauf Buriev		(substituted off) 72'
LB	5	Mukhammadkodir Khamraliev
CM	7	Abbosbek Fayzullaev
CM	17	Diyor Kholmatov		(substituted off) 64'
CM	10	Jasurbek Jaloliddinov		(substituted off) 72'
RF	13	Zafarmurod Abdurakhmatov
CF	14	Eldor Shomurodov (c)		(substituted off) 84'
LF	11	Oston Urunov		(substituted off) 46'
Substitutes:
GK	12	Vladimir Nazarov
DF	2	Saidazamat Mirsaidov
MF	15	Umarali Rakhmonaliev	(yellow card) 86'	(substituted on) 64'
MF	19	Ibrokhim Ibragimov		(substituted on) 72'
FW	8	Ruslanbek Jiyanov		(substituted on) 46'
FW	9	Khusayin Norchaev		(substituted on) 72'
FW	20	Alisher Odilov		(substituted on) 84'
Manager:
Timur Kapadze

GK	1	Hamza Alaa
RB	4	Ahmed Eid
CB	2	Omar Fayed
CB	5	Hossam Abdelmaguid
LB	13	Karim El Debes
DM	17	Mohamed Elneny (c)
CM	6	Mohamed Shehata	(yellow card) 13'	(substituted off) 64'
CM	12	Ahmed Nabil Koka
RF	14	Ahmed Sayed		(substituted off) 65'
CF	9	Osama Faisal		(substituted off) 87'
LF	10	Ibrahim Adel		(substituted off) 90+2'
Substitutes:
GK	16	Ali El Gabry
DF	15	Mohamed Tarek
MF	3	Ahmed Atef		(substituted on) 64'
MF	8	Ziad Kamal		(substituted on) 90+2'
MF	11	Mostafa Saad		(substituted on) 65'
FW	18	Bilal Mazhar	(yellow card) 90+4'	(substituted on) 87'
Manager:
(Brazil) Rogério Micale

Assistant referees:
Isaac Trevis (New Zealand)
Bernard Mutukera (Solomon Islands)
Fourth official:
Odette Hamilton (Jamaica)
Video assistant referee:
Paolo Valeri (Italy)
Assistant video assistant referee:
Leodán González (Uruguay)

=== Dominican Republic vs Uzbekistan ===
30 July 2024
15:00

Dominican Republic	1–1	Uzbekistan
Núñez 51' (pen.)	Report	Odilov 58'

Parc des Princes, Paris
Attendance: 30,475
Referee: Mahmood Ismail (Sudan)

Dominican Republic	Uzbekistan

GK	1	Xavier Valdez
CB	4	Edgar Pujol
CB	12	Joao Urbáez		(substituted off) 82'
CB	5	Luiyi de Lucas	(yellow card) 55'	(substituted off) 88'
RM	17	José de León		(substituted off) 46'
CM	8	Ángel Montes de Oca
CM	6	Heinz Mörschel
LM	9	Rafael Núñez
RF	18	Nowend Lorenzo (c)		(substituted off) 65'
CF	11	Peter González
LF	7	Oscar Ureña		(substituted off) 46'
Substitutes:
GK	13	Enrique Bösl
DF	2	Francisco Marizán		(substituted on) 46'
DF	16	Nelson Lemaire		(substituted on) 82'
DF	20	Thomas Jungbauer		(substituted on) 88'
MF	3	Josué Báez		(substituted on) 46'
MF	14	Omar de la Cruz		(substituted on) 65'
Manager:
(Spain) Ibai Gómez

GK	12	Vladimir Nazarov
RB	13	Zafarmurod Abdurakhmatov
CB	3	Abdukodir Khusanov	(yellow card) 25'
CB	5	Mukhammadkodir Khamraliev
LB	2	Saidazamat Mirsaidov
DM	18	Abdurauf Buriev (c)
DM	15	Umarali Rakhmonaliev		(substituted off) 90+3'
CM	19	Ibrokhim Ibragimov		(substituted off) 57'
RF	20	Alisher Odilov		(substituted off) 84'
CF	9	Khusayin Norchaev		(substituted off) 58'
LF	8	Ruslanbek Jiyanov		(substituted off) 57'
Substitutes:
GK	1	Abduvohid Nematov
DF	16	Asadbek Rakhimjonov		(substituted on) 90+3'
MF	10	Jasurbek Jaloliddinov		(substituted on) 57'
MF	17	Diyor Kholmatov		(substituted on) 84'
MF	21	Bekhruz Askarov
FW	7	Abbosbek Fayzullaev		(substituted on) 57'
FW	14	Eldor Shomurodov		(substituted on) 58'
Manager:
Timur Kapadze

Assistant referees:
Elvis Noupue (Cameroon)
Liban Abdoulrazack Ahmed (Djibouti)
Fourth official:
Kim Yu-jeong (South Korea)
Video assistant referee:
Rodrigo Carvajal (Chile)
Assistant video assistant referee:
Daiane Muniz (Brazil)

=== Spain vs Egypt ===
30 July 2024
15:00

Spain	1–2	Egypt
Aghehowa 90'	Report	Adel 40', 62'

Stade de Bordeaux, Bordeaux
Attendance: 12,180
Referee: Drew Fischer (Canada)

Spain	Egypt

GK	22	Alejandro Iturbe
RB	2	Marc Pubill	(substituted off) 46'
CB	19	Cristhian Mosquera
CB	12	Jon Pacheco
LB	15	Miguel Gutiérrez	(substituted off) 68'
RM	14	Aimar Oroz	(substituted off) 46'
CM	8	Beñat Turrientes	(substituted off) 63'
CM	16	Adrián Bernabé	(substituted off) 63'
LM	7	Diego López
CF	18	Samu Aghehowa
CF	21	Sergio Camello (c)
Substitutes:
GK	1	Arnau Tenas
DF	3	Juan Miranda	(substituted on) 68'
DF	4	Eric García
DF	20	Juanlu Sánchez	(substituted on) 46'
MF	6	Pablo Barrios	(substituted on) 63'
FW	11	Fermín López	(substituted on) 63'
FW	17	Sergio Gómez	(substituted on) 46'
Manager:
Santi Denia

GK	1	Hamza Alaa
RB	13	Karim El Debes		(substituted off) 46'
CB	2	Omar Fayed		(substituted off) 70'
CB	5	Hossam Abdelmaguid
LB	4	Ahmed Eid	(yellow card) 4'	(substituted off) 90+7'
DM	17	Mohamed Elneny (c)
CM	6	Mohamed Shehata		(substituted off) 81'
CM	12	Ahmed Nabil Koka
RF	14	Ahmed Sayed
CF	9	Osama Faisal		(substituted off) 81'
LF	10	Ibrahim Adel
Substitutes:
GK	16	Ali El Gabry
DF	15	Mohamed Tarek		(substituted on) 70'
MF	3	Ahmed Atef		(substituted on) 81'
MF	7	Mahmoud Saber		(substituted on) 46'
MF	8	Ziad Kamal		(substituted on) 90+7'
MF	11	Mostafa Saad
FW	18	Bilal Mazhar		(substituted on) 81'
Manager:
(Brazil) Rogério Micale

Assistant referees:
Micheal Barwegen (Canada)
Lyes Arfa (Canada)
Fourth official:
Jelena Cvetković (Serbia)
Video assistant referee:
Tatiana Guzmán (Nicaragua)
Assistant video assistant referee:
Daneon Parchment (Jamaica)

== Discipline ==
Fair play points would have been used as a tiebreaker if the overall and head-to-head records of teams were tied. These were calculated based on yellow and red cards received in all group matches as follows:

- first yellow card: minus 1 point;
- indirect red card (second yellow card): minus 3 points;
- direct red card: minus 4 points;
- yellow card and direct red card: minus 5 points;

Wquphvzi Only one of the above deductions could be applied to a player in a single match.

Team	Match 1				Match 2				Match 3				Points
Team	Booked	(yellow card) (yellow-red card)	Sent off (straight red)	(yellow card) (red card)	Booked	(yellow card) (yellow-red card)	Sent off (straight red)	(yellow card) (red card)	Booked	(yellow card) (yellow-red card)	Sent off (straight red)	(yellow card) (red card)	Points
Egypt	1				2				1				–4
Uzbekistan	3				1				1				–5
Dominican Republic	2						1		1				–7
Spain	5				2								–7
