= Football at the 2024 Summer Olympics – Men's team squads =

List of footballers

The men's football tournament at the 2024 Summer Olympics was an international football tournament held in France from 24 July to 9 August 2024. The sixteen participating national teams were required to submit squads of 18 players – of which two had to be goalkeepers – by 3 July 2024, 21 days prior to the opening match of the tournament. At least fifteen players in the list had to be born on or after 1 January 2001, and three of whom could be older dispensation players. Additionally, teams could name a maximum of four alternate players, numbered from 19 to 22. The alternate list could contain at most three outfielders, as at least one slot was reserved for a goalkeeper. In the event that a player on the submitted squad list suffered an injury or illness, that player would have been able to be replaced by one of the players in the alternate list. Only players in these squads were eligible to take part in the tournament.

The final squad lists with kit numbers were published by FIFA on 11 July 2024.

The age listed for each player is on 24 July 2024, the first day of the tournament. The numbers of caps and goals listed for each player do not include any matches played after the start of the tournament. The club listed is the club for which the player last played a competitive match prior to the tournament. (Note: This is the club a player was last able to play for during the previous season in the event a player did not play a competitive match.) The nationality for each club reflects the national association (not the league) to which the club is affiliated. A flag is included for coaches who are of a different nationality than their own national team. Players in bold were capped at full international level prior to the tournament.

== Group A ==
=== France ===
France announced a 25-men preliminary squad on 3 June 2024. Lucas Chevalier, Bafodé Diakité, Leny Yoro, Warren Zaïre-Emery, Bradley Barcola and Mathys Tel withdrew from the squad due to their club's refusal to release them and were replaced by Chrislain Matsima, Andy Diouf and Rayan Cherki on 11 June 2024. A week later, Maxime Estève withdrew and was replaced by Loïc Badé. On 26 June, Robin Risser withdrew injured and was replaced by Théo De Percin. In the same day, Soungoutou Magassa was added to the squad. On 3 July, Khéphren Thuram withdrew due to his new club's refusal to ultimately release him. The final squad was announced on 4 July. Lesley Ugochukwu withdrew on 21 July after being recalled by his club and was replaced by Johann Lepenant in the alternative list.

Head coach: Thierry Henry

No.	Pos.	Player	Date of birth (age)	Caps	Goals	Club
1	GK	Obed Nkambadio	7 February 2003 (aged 21)	1	0	(French Football Federation) Paris FC
2	DF	**Castello Lukeba**	17 December 2002 (aged 21)	2	0	(German Football Association) RB Leipzig
3	DF	**Adrien Truffert**	20 November 2001 (aged 22)	3	0	(French Football Federation) Rennes
4	DF	Loïc Badé*	11 April 2000 (aged 24)	0	0	(Royal Spanish Football Federation) Sevilla
5	DF	Kiliann Sildillia	16 May 2002 (aged 22)	3	0	(German Football Association) SC Freiburg
6	MF	Manu Koné	17 May 2001 (aged 23)	3	0	(German Football Association) Borussia Mönchengladbach
7	FW	Michael Olise	12 December 2001 (aged 22)	1	0	(The Football Association) Crystal Palace
8	MF	Maghnes Akliouche	25 February 2002 (aged 22)	2	0	(French Football Federation) Monaco
9	FW	Arnaud Kalimuendo	20 January 2002 (aged 22)	2	2	(French Football Federation) Rennes
10	FW	**Alexandre Lacazette*** (captain)	28 May 1991 (aged 33)	1	0	(French Football Federation) Lyon
11	MF	Désiré Doué	3 June 2005 (aged 19)	3	2	(French Football Federation) Rennes
12	MF	Enzo Millot	17 July 2002 (aged 22)	2	0	(German Football Association) VfB Stuttgart
13	MF	Joris Chotard	24 September 2001 (aged 22)	1	0	(French Football Federation) Montpellier
14	FW	Jean-Philippe Mateta*	28 June 1997 (aged 27)	1	2	(The Football Association) Crystal Palace
15	DF	Bradley Locko	6 May 2002 (aged 22)	2	0	(French Football Federation) Brest
16	GK	Guillaume Restes	11 March 2005 (aged 19)	2	0	(French Football Federation) Toulouse
17	DF	Soungoutou Magassa	8 October 2003 (aged 20)	1	0	(French Football Federation) Monaco
18	FW	Rayan Cherki	17 August 2003 (aged 20)	3	1	(French Football Federation) Lyon
19	DF	Chrislain Matsima	19 May 2002 (aged 22)	1	0	(French Football Federation) Clermont
20	MF	Andy Diouf	17 May 2003 (aged 21)	2	1	(French Football Federation) Lens
21	MF	Johann Lepenant	22 October 2002 (aged 21)	0	0	(French Football Federation) Lyon

* Overage player.

Unenrolled alternate players
No.	Pos.	Player	Date of birth (age)	Caps	Goals	Club
22	GK	Théo De Percin	2 February 2001 (aged 23)	0	0	(French Football Federation) Auxerre

=== Guinea ===
Guinea announced their final squad on 4 July 2024. Aguibou Camara withdrew from the squad on 10 July after his club refused to release him, and was replaced by Sékou Tidiany Bangoura.

Head coach: Kaba Diawara

No.	Pos.	Player	Date of birth (age)	Caps	Goals	Club
1	GK	**Soumaïla Sylla**	15 March 2004 (aged 20)	1	0	(French Football Federation) Reims
2	DF	Naby Oularé	6 August 2002 (aged 21)	5	0	(Turkish Football Federation) Boluspor
3	DF	Bangaly Cissé	28 December 2002 (aged 21)	4	0	(Guinean Football Federation) Kaloum
4	DF	**Mohamed Soumah**	13 March 2003 (aged 21)	7	0	(Royal Belgian Football Association) Gent
5	DF	Rayane Doucouré	30 March 2001 (aged 23)	0	0	(French Football Federation) Red Star
6	MF	**Amadou Diawara***	17 July 1997 (aged 27)	0	0	(Royal Belgian Football Association) Anderlecht
7	FW	**Aliou Baldé**	12 December 2002 (aged 21)	0	0	(French Football Federation) Nice
8	MF	**Naby Keïta*** (captain)	10 February 1995 (aged 29)	0	0	(German Football Association) Werder Bremen
9	FW	Henry Camara	6 May 2006 (aged 18)	0	0	(Italian Football Federation) Atalanta
10	MF	**Ilaix Moriba**	19 January 2003 (aged 21)	1	1	(Royal Spanish Football Federation) Getafe
11	FW	**Ousmane Camara**	3 November 2001 (aged 22)	7	0	(French Football Federation) Annecy
12	FW	Algassime Bah	12 November 2002 (aged 21)	7	1	(Hellenic Football Federation) Olympiacos
13	DF	Madiou Keita	29 August 2004 (aged 19)	6	0	(French Football Federation) Auxerre
14	FW	Amadou Diallo	13 July 2006 (aged 18)	1	0	(French Football Federation) Rennes
15	MF	Issiaga Camara	2 February 2005 (aged 19)	1	0	(French Football Federation) Nice
16	GK	Mory Keita	13 July 2005 (aged 19)	5	0	(Guinean Football Federation) Sangarédi
17	MF	**Abdoulaye Touré***	3 March 1994 (aged 30)	0	0	(French Football Federation) Le Havre
18	MF	**Sekou Tidiany Bangoura**	5 April 2002 (aged 22)	3	0	(Turkish Football Federation) Tuzlaspor
20	DF	Chérif Camara	21 October 2002 (aged 21)	2	0	(Guinean Football Federation) Hafia
21	MF	Lass Kourouma	30 March 2004 (aged 20)	0	0	(Royal Spanish Football Federation) Levante

* Overage player.

Unenrolled alternate players
No.	Pos.	Player	Date of birth (age)	Caps	Goals	Club
19	FW	Ibrahima Chérif Fofana	27 October 2006 (aged 17)	0	0	(Guinean Football Federation) Kaloum
22	GK	Lassana Diakhaby	1 May 2004 (aged 20)	0	0	(French Football Federation) Valenciennes

=== New Zealand ===
New Zealand announced their final squad on 9 July 2024. Lachlan Bayliss replaced the injured Riley Bidois on 23 July, while Luis Toomey was called-up as an alternate player.

Head coach: (England) Darren Bazeley

No.	Pos.	Player	Date of birth (age)	Caps	Goals	Club
1	GK	**Alex Paulsen**	4 July 2002 (aged 22)	4	0	(New Zealand Football) Wellington Phoenix
2	DF	**Michael Boxall***	18 August 1988 (aged 35)	12	1	(United States Soccer Federation) Minnesota United
3	DF	**Sam Sutton**	10 December 2001 (aged 22)	4	1	(New Zealand Football) Wellington Phoenix
4	DF	**Tyler Bindon**	27 January 2005 (aged 19)	0	0	(The Football Association) Reading
5	DF	**Finn Surman**	23 September 2003 (aged 20)	4	0	(New Zealand Football) Wellington Phoenix
6	MF	**Joe Bell***	27 April 1999 (aged 25)	6	0	(Norwegian Football Federation) Viking
7	MF	**Matthew Garbett** (captain)	13 April 2002 (aged 22)	2	0	(Royal Dutch Football Association) NAC Breda
8	MF	**Ben Old**	13 August 2002 (aged 21)	2	1	(New Zealand Football) Wellington Phoenix
9	FW	**Ben Waine**	11 June 2001 (aged 23)	10	8	(The Football Association) Plymouth Argyle
10	MF	**Sarpreet Singh***	20 February 1999 (aged 25)	0	0	(German Football Association) Hansa Rostock
11	FW	**Jesse Randall**	19 August 2002 (aged 21)	5	4	(New Zealand Football) Wellington Olympic
12	GK	Kees Sims	27 March 2003 (aged 21)	1	0	(Swedish Football Association) GAIS
13	DF	Lukas Kelly-Heald	18 March 2005 (aged 19)	3	0	(New Zealand Football) Wellington Phoenix
14	FW	Jay Herdman	14 August 2004 (aged 19)	2	1	(Canadian Soccer Association) Vancouver Whitecaps
15	DF	Matthew Sheridan	9 May 2004 (aged 20)	2	0	(New Zealand Football) Wellington Phoenix
16	MF	Fin Conchie	10 August 2003 (aged 20)	2	0	(New Zealand Football) Wellington Phoenix
17	MF	Lachlan Bayliss	24 July 2002 (aged 22)	0	0	(Football Australia) Newcastle Jets
18	FW	**Oskar van Hattum**	14 April 2002 (aged 22)	5	2	(New Zealand Football) Wellington Phoenix
19	FW	Liam Gillion	17 October 2002 (aged 21)	2	1	(New Zealand Football) Auckland City
20	DF	Isaac Hughes	25 March 2004 (aged 20)	2	0	(New Zealand Football) Wellington Phoenix

* Overage player.

Unenrolled alternate players
No.	Pos.	Player	Date of birth (age)	Caps	Goals	Club
21	FW	Luis Toomey	1 July 2001 (aged 23)	2	1	(New Zealand Football) Eastern Suburbs
22	GK	Henry Gray	29 March 2005 (aged 19)	0	0	(The Football Association) Ipswich Town

=== United States ===
The United States announced their final squad on 8 July 2024.

Head coach: (Serbia) Marko Mitrović

No.	Pos.	Player	Date of birth (age)	Caps	Goals	Club
1	GK	**Patrick Schulte**	13 March 2001 (aged 23)	3	0	(United States Soccer Federation) Columbus Crew
2	DF	Nathan Harriel	23 April 2001 (aged 23)	7	1	(United States Soccer Federation) Philadelphia Union
3	DF	**Walker Zimmerman***	19 May 1993 (aged 31)	4	0	(United States Soccer Federation) Nashville SC
4	DF	Maximilian Dietz	9 February 2002 (aged 22)	6	0	(German Football Association) Greuther Fürth
5	DF	**John Tolkin**	31 July 2002 (aged 21)	7	0	(United States Soccer Federation) New York Red Bulls
6	MF	**Gianluca Busio**	28 May 2002 (aged 22)	6	1	(Italian Football Federation) Venezia
7	FW	**Kevin Paredes**	7 May 2003 (aged 21)	2	0	(German Football Association) VfL Wolfsburg
8	MF	**Tanner Tessmann** (captain)	24 September 2001 (aged 22)	10	0	(Italian Football Federation) Venezia
9	FW	Griffin Yow	25 September 2002 (aged 21)	3	1	(Royal Belgian Football Association) Westerlo
10	FW	**Taylor Booth**	31 May 2001 (aged 23)	4	0	(Royal Dutch Football Association) Utrecht
11	FW	**Paxten Aaronson**	26 August 2003 (aged 20)	5	1	(Royal Dutch Football Association) Vitesse
12	DF	**Miles Robinson***	14 March 1997 (aged 27)	3	1	(United States Soccer Federation) FC Cincinnati
13	FW	**Duncan McGuire**	5 February 2001 (aged 23)	5	1	(United States Soccer Federation) Orlando City
14	MF	**Djordje Mihailovic***	10 November 1998 (aged 25)	9	1	(United States Soccer Federation) Colorado Rapids
15	MF	**Benjamin Cremaschi**	2 March 2005 (aged 19)	5	1	(United States Soccer Federation) Inter Miami
16	MF	**Jack McGlynn**	7 July 2003 (aged 21)	7	0	(United States Soccer Federation) Philadelphia Union
17	DF	**Caleb Wiley**	22 December 2004 (aged 19)	5	0	(United States Soccer Federation) Atlanta United
18	GK	**Gabriel Slonina**	15 April 2004 (aged 20)	0	0	(Royal Belgian Football Association) Eupen
21	MF	**Josh Atencio**	31 January 2002 (aged 22)	0	0	(United States Soccer Federation) Seattle Sounders

* Overage player.

Unenrolled alternate players
No.	Pos.	Player	Date of birth (age)	Caps	Goals	Club
19	MF	Jake Davis	3 January 2002 (aged 22)	0	0	(United States Soccer Federation) Sporting Kansas City
20	FW	Johan Gomez	23 July 2001 (aged 23)	7	2	(German Football Association) Eintracht Braunschweig
22	GK	John Pulskamp	19 April 2001 (aged 23)	3	0	(United States Soccer Federation) Sporting Kansas City

== Group B ==
=== Argentina ===
Argentina announced their final squad on 3 July 2024.

Head coach: Javier Mascherano

No.	Pos.	Player	Date of birth (age)	Club
1	GK	**Gerónimo Rulli***	20 May 1992 (aged 32)	(Royal Dutch Football Association) Ajax
2	DF	Marco Di Cesare	30 January 2002 (aged 22)	(Argentine Football Association) Racing
3	DF	Julio Soler	16 February 2005 (aged 19)	(Argentine Football Association) Lanus
4	DF	Joaquín García	21 August 2001 (aged 22)	(Argentine Football Association) Vélez Sarsfield
5	MF	Ezequiel Fernández	25 July 2002 (aged 21)	(Argentine Football Association) Boca Juniors
6	DF	Bruno Amione	3 January 2002 (aged 22)	(Mexican Football Federation) Santos Laguna
7	MF	Kevin Zenón	30 July 2001 (aged 22)	(Argentine Football Association) Boca Juniors
8	MF	Cristian Medina	1 June 2002 (aged 22)	(Argentine Football Association) Boca Juniors
9	FW	**Julián Álvarez***	31 January 2000 (aged 24)	(The Football Association) Manchester City
10	FW	**Thiago Almada**	26 April 2001 (aged 23)	(United States Soccer Federation) Atlanta United
11	MF	Claudio Echeverri	2 January 2006 (aged 18)	(Argentine Football Association) River Plate
12	GK	Leandro Brey	21 September 2002 (aged 21)	(Argentine Football Association) Boca Juniors
13	DF	Gonzalo Luján	21 April 2001 (aged 23)	(Argentine Football Association) San Lorenzo
14	MF	Santiago Hezze	22 October 2001 (aged 22)	(Hellenic Football Federation) Olympiacos
15	FW	Luciano Gondou	22 June 2001 (aged 23)	(Argentine Football Association) Argentinos Juniors
16	DF	**Nicolás Otamendi*** (captain)	12 February 1988 (aged 36)	(Portuguese Football Federation) Benfica
17	FW	Giuliano Simeone	18 December 2002 (aged 21)	(Royal Spanish Football Federation) Alavés
18	FW	Lucas Beltrán	29 March 2001 (aged 23)	(Italian Football Federation) Fiorentina

* Overage player.

Unenrolled alternate players
No.	Pos.	Player	Date of birth (age)	Club
19	DF	Aarón Quirós	31 October 2001 (aged 22)	(Argentine Football Association) Banfield
20	MF	Juan Nardoni	14 July 2002 (aged 22)	(Argentine Football Association) Racing
21	MF	Federico Redondo	18 January 2003 (aged 21)	(United States Soccer Federation) Inter Miami
22	GK	Fabricio Iacovich	29 January 2002 (aged 22)	(Argentine Football Association) Estudiantes

=== Iraq ===
Iraq announced their initial 22-men squad on 26 June 2024.

Head coach: Radhi Shenaishil

No.	Pos.	Player	Date of birth (age)	Caps	Goals	Club
1	GK	Hussein Hassan	15 October 2002 (aged 21)	7	0	(Iraq Football Association) Al-Karkh
2	DF	Josef Al-Imam	27 July 2004 (aged 19)	17	0	(Swedish Football Association) BK Olympic
3	DF	**Hussein Ali**	1 March 2002 (aged 22)	0	0	(Royal Dutch Football Association) Heerenveen
4	DF	**Saad Natiq*** (captain)	19 March 1994 (aged 30)	8	0	(Iraq Football Association) Al-Quwa Al-Jawiya
5	DF	Ahmed Maknzi	24 September 2001 (aged 22)	17	1	(Iraq Football Association) Erbil
6	DF	**Zaid Tahseen**	29 January 2001 (aged 23)	23	2	(Iraq Football Association) Al-Talaba
7	MF	**Ali Jasim**	20 January 2004 (aged 20)	13	9	(Iraq Football Association) Al-Quwa Al-Jawiya
8	MF	**Ibrahim Bayesh***	1 May 2000 (aged 24)	4	0	(Iraq Football Association) Al-Quwa Al-Jawiya
9	FW	Hussein Abdullah	20 January 2001 (aged 23)	16	12	(Iraq Football Association) Al-Talaba
10	FW	**Youssef Amyn**	21 August 2003 (aged 20)	0	0	(German Football Association) Eintracht Braunschweig
11	MF	**Muntadher Mohammed**	5 June 2001 (aged 23)	26	3	(Football Federation Islamic Republic of Iran) Mes Rafsanjan
12	GK	Kumel Al-Rekabe	19 August 2004 (aged 19)	10	0	(Iraq Football Association) Naft Al-Basra
13	DF	Karrar Saad	22 March 2001 (aged 23)	20	1	(Iraq Football Association) Al-Talaba
14	MF	Karrar Mohammed	6 January 2001 (aged 23)	22	0	(Iraq Football Association) Al-Talaba
15	MF	Nihad Mohammed	14 January 2001 (aged 23)	17	0	(Iraq Football Association) Al-Talaba
16	MF	Muntadher Abdulameer	6 October 2001 (aged 22)	24	1	(Iraq Football Association) Al-Zawraa
17	DF	**Mustafa Saadoon**	25 May 2001 (aged 23)	17	2	(Iraq Football Association) Al-Quwa Al-Jawiya
18	FW	**Aymen Hussein***	22 March 1996 (aged 28)	14	11	(Iraq Football Association) Al-Quwa Al-Jawiya
20	DF	Hussein Amer	28 April 2002 (aged 22)	12	0	(Iraq Football Association) Naft Maysan

* Overage player.

Unenrolled alternate players
No.	Pos.	Player	Date of birth (age)	Caps	Goals	Club
19	MF	Blnd Hassan	12 August 2003 (aged 20)	13	4	(Royal Dutch Football Association) De Graafschap
21	FW	Ridha Fadhil	1 April 2001 (aged 23)	16	6	(Iraq Football Association) Amanat Baghdad
22	GK	Hassan Abbas	6 January 2001 (aged 23)	3	0	(Iraq Football Association) Amanat Baghdad

=== Morocco ===
Morocco announced their initial 22-men squad on 4 July 2024. Ayman El Wafi withdrew on 9 July 2024 after his club refused to release him, and was replaced by Bilal El Ouadghiri.

Head coach: Tarik Sektioui

No.	Pos.	Player	Date of birth (age)	Caps	Goals	Club
1	GK	**Munir El Kajoui***	10 May 1989 (aged 35)	0	0	(Saudi Arabian Football Federation) Al-Wehda
2	DF	**Achraf Hakimi*** (captain)	4 November 1998 (aged 25)	2	0	(French Football Federation) Paris Saint-Germain
3	DF	Akram Nakach	7 April 2002 (aged 22)	1	0	(Royal Moroccan Football Federation) Union de Touarga
4	DF	Mehdi Boukamir	26 January 2004 (aged 20)	8	0	(Royal Belgian Football Association) Charleroi
5	DF	Adil Tahif	24 February 2001 (aged 23)	5	0	(Royal Moroccan Football Federation) RS Berkane
6	MF	Benjamin Bouchouari	13 November 2001 (aged 22)	10	0	(French Football Federation) Saint-Étienne
7	FW	**Eliesse Ben Seghir**	16 February 2005 (aged 19)	0	0	(French Football Federation) Monaco
8	MF	**Bilal El Khannous**	10 May 2004 (aged 20)	2	0	(Royal Belgian Football Association) Genk
9	FW	**Soufiane Rahimi***	2 June 1996 (aged 28)	5	5	(United Arab Emirates Football Association) Al-Ain
10	FW	**Ilias Akhomach**	16 April 2004 (aged 20)	1	0	(Royal Spanish Football Federation) Villarreal
11	DF	Zakaria El Ouahdi	31 December 2001 (aged 22)	13	3	(Royal Belgian Football Association) Genk
12	GK	Rachid Ghanimi	25 April 2001 (aged 23)	1	0	(Royal Moroccan Football Federation) FUS Rabat
13	MF	Yassine Kechta	25 February 2002 (aged 22)	7	1	(French Football Federation) Le Havre
14	MF	Oussama Targhalline	20 May 2002 (aged 22)	10	1	(French Football Federation) Le Havre
15	FW	El Mehdi Maouhoub	5 June 2003 (aged 21)	2	1	(Royal Moroccan Football Federation) Raja Casablanca
16	FW	**Abde Ezzalzouli**	25 December 2001 (aged 22)	5	3	(Royal Spanish Football Federation) Real Betis
17	MF	**Oussama El Azzouzi**	29 May 2001 (aged 23)	7	0	(Italian Football Federation) Bologna
18	MF	**Amir Richardson**	24 January 2002 (aged 22)	8	1	(French Football Federation) Reims
19	DF	Haytam Manaout	18 April 2001 (aged 23)	3	0	(Royal Moroccan Football Federation) Union de Touarga

* Overage player.

Unenrolled alternate players
No.	Pos.	Player	Date of birth (age)	Caps	Goals	Club
20	MF	El Mehdi El Moubarik	22 January 2001 (aged 23)	4	0	(Royal Moroccan Football Federation) Raja Casablanca
21	DF	Bilal El Ouadghiri	3 August 2001 (aged 22)	1	0	(Royal Moroccan Football Federation) FUS Rabat
22	GK	Mohamed Reda Asmama	8 February 2002 (aged 22)	2	0	(Royal Moroccan Football Federation) Union de Touarga

=== Ukraine ===
Ukraine announced their initial 22-men squad on 3 July 2024.

Head coach: Ruslan Rotan

No.	Pos.	Player	Date of birth (age)	Caps	Goals	Club
1	GK	Heorhiy Yermakov	28 March 2002 (aged 22)	3	0	(Ukrainian Association of Football) Oleksandriya
2	DF	Illya Krupskyi	2 October 2004 (aged 19)	4	0	(Ukrainian Association of Football) Vorskla Poltava
3	DF	Oleksandr Martynyuk	25 November 2001 (aged 22)	5	1	(Ukrainian Association of Football) Oleksandriya
4	DF	**Maksym Talovyerov***	28 June 2000 (aged 24)	0	0	(Austrian Football Association) LASK
5	MF	Valentyn Rubchynskyi	15 February 2002 (aged 22)	3	0	(Ukrainian Association of Football) Dnipro-1
6	DF	Oleksiy Sych	1 April 2001 (aged 23)	1	0	(Ukrainian Association of Football) Rukh Lviv
7	MF	Oleh Ocheretko	25 May 2003 (aged 21)	1	0	(Ukrainian Association of Football) Shakhtar Donetsk
8	MF	Mykola Mykhaylenko	22 May 2001 (aged 23)	2	1	(Ukrainian Association of Football) Dynamo Kyiv
9	FW	Ihor Krasnopir	1 December 2002 (aged 21)	4	0	(Ukrainian Association of Football) Rukh Lviv
10	MF	Maksym Braharu	21 July 2002 (aged 22)	2	0	(Ukrainian Association of Football) Dynamo Kyiv
11	MF	Maksym Khlan	27 January 2003 (aged 21)	5	2	(Polish Football Association) Lechia Gdańsk
12	GK	Kiril Fesyun	7 August 2002 (aged 21)	3	0	(Ukrainian Association of Football) Shakhtar Donetsk
13	DF	Volodymyr Salyuk	25 June 2002 (aged 22)	3	0	(Ukrainian Association of Football) Chornomorets Odesa
14	FW	**Danylo Sikan** (captain)	16 April 2001 (aged 23)	4	1	(Ukrainian Association of Football) Shakhtar Donetsk
15	MF	Vladyslav Veleten	1 October 2002 (aged 21)	4	2	(Ukrainian Association of Football) Kolos Kovalivka
16	DF	Arseniy Batahov	5 March 2002 (aged 22)	3	0	(Ukrainian Association of Football) Zorya Luhansk
17	MF	Oleh Fedor	23 July 2004 (aged 20)	6	1	(Ukrainian Association of Football) Rukh Lviv
18	MF	Dmytro Kryskiv*	6 October 2000 (aged 23)	0	0	(Ukrainian Association of Football) Shakhtar Donetsk

* Overage player.

Unenrolled alternate players
No.	Pos.	Player	Date of birth (age)	Caps	Goals	Club
19	DF	Yevhen Pavlyuk	18 August 2002 (aged 21)	4	0	(Ukrainian Association of Football) Vorskla Poltava
20	MF	Kyrylo Siheyev	16 May 2004 (aged 20)	6	0	(Ukrainian Association of Football) Shakhtar Donetsk
21	MF	Artem Shulyanskyi	11 April 2001 (aged 23)	1	0	(Ukrainian Association of Football) Oleksandriya
22	GK	Yakiv Kinareykin	22 October 2003 (aged 20)	0	0	(Ukrainian Association of Football) Dnipro-1

== Group C ==
=== Dominican Republic ===
The Dominican Republic announced a 27-player preliminary squad on 12 June 2024. The squad was reduced to 21 players on 28 June. Junior Firpo withdrew from the squad on 23 July after being recalled by his club and was replaced by Josué Báez.

Head coach: (Spain) Ibai Gómez

No.	Pos.	Player	Date of birth (age)	Caps	Goals	Club
1	GK	**Xavier Valdez**	23 November 2003 (aged 20)	0	0	(United States Soccer Federation) Houston Dynamo
2	DF	Francisco Marizán	28 March 2006 (aged 18)	2	0	(Royal Dutch Football Association) Volendam
3	MF	Josué Báez	23 May 2002 (aged 22)	4	0	(Dominican Football Federation) O&M
4	DF	Edgar Pujol	7 August 2004 (aged 19)	1	0	(Royal Spanish Football Federation) Real Madrid
5	DF	**Luiyi de Lucas***	31 August 1994 (aged 29)	0	0	(Cyprus Football Association) AEL Limassol
6	MF	**Heinz Mörschel***	24 August 1997 (aged 26)	0	0	(Hungarian Football Federation) Újpest
7	FW	Óscar Ureña	31 May 2003 (aged 21)	1	0	(Royal Spanish Football Federation) Leganés
8	MF	Ángel Montes de Oca	18 February 2001 (aged 23)	1	0	(Dominican Football Federation) Cibao
9	FW	**Rafael Núñez**	25 January 2002 (aged 22)	4	0	(Royal Spanish Football Federation) Elche
10	MF	**Edison Azcona**	21 November 2003 (aged 20)	4	1	(United States Soccer Federation) Las Vegas Lights
11	FW	Peter González	25 July 2002 (aged 21)	0	0	(Royal Spanish Football Federation) Valencia
12	DF	**Joao Urbáez**	24 July 2002 (aged 22)	4	0	(Royal Spanish Football Federation) Leganés
13	GK	Enrique Bösl	7 February 2004 (aged 20)	2	0	(German Football Association) FC Ingolstadt 04
14	MF	Omar de la Cruz	26 August 2001 (aged 22)	6	0	(Royal Spanish Football Federation) Peña Deportiva
15	MF	**Fabian Messina**	16 September 2002 (aged 21)	5	0	(German Football Association) FSV Frankfurt
16	DF	Nelson Lemaire	19 October 2001 (aged 22)	0	0	(Royal Belgian Football Association) Union Saint-Gilloise
17	FW	José de León	2 March 2004 (aged 20)	1	0	(Royal Spanish Football Federation) Alavés
18	FW	**Nowend Lorenzo** (captain)	2 November 2002 (aged 21)	4	0	(Royal Spanish Football Federation) Osasuna
20	DF	Thomas Jungbauer	30 July 2005 (aged 18)	3	0	(Football Association of the Czech Republic) Dynamo České Budějovice

* Overage player.

Unenrolled alternate players
No.	Pos.	Player	Date of birth (age)	Caps	Goals	Club
22	GK	Anthony Núñez	14 October 2005 (aged 18)	0	0	(The Football Association) Mansfield Town

=== Egypt ===
Egypt announced their initial 22-men squad on 4 July 2024.

Head coach: (Brazil) Rogério Micale

No.	Pos.	Player	Date of birth (age)	Club
1	GK	Hamza Alaa	1 March 2001 (aged 23)	(Egyptian Football Association) Al-Ahly
2	DF	Omar Fayed	4 July 2003 (aged 21)	(Football Association of Serbia) Novi Pazar
3	MF	Ahmed Atef	19 December 2002 (aged 21)	(Egyptian Football Association) ZED FC
4	DF	Ahmed Eid	1 January 2001 (aged 23)	(Egyptian Football Association) Al-Masry
5	DF	**Hossam Abdelmaguid**	30 April 2001 (aged 23)	(Egyptian Football Association) Zamalek
6	MF	Mohamed Shehata	8 February 2001 (aged 23)	(Egyptian Football Association) Zamalek
7	MF	Mahmoud Saber	30 July 2001 (aged 22)	(Egyptian Football Association) Pyramids
8	MF	Ziad Kamal	1 January 2001 (aged 23)	(Egyptian Football Association) Zamalek
9	FW	**Osama Faisal**	1 January 2001 (aged 23)	(Egyptian Football Association) National Bank of Egypt
10	MF	**Ibrahim Adel**	23 April 2001 (aged 23)	(Egyptian Football Association) Pyramids
11	MF	Mostafa Saad	22 August 2001 (aged 22)	(Egyptian Football Association) ZED FC
12	MF	**Ahmed Koka**	4 July 2001 (aged 23)	(Egyptian Football Association) Al-Ahly
13	DF	Karim El Debes	3 June 2003 (aged 21)	(Egyptian Football Association) Al-Ahly
14	MF	**Ahmed Sayed***	10 January 1996 (aged 28)	(Egyptian Football Association) Zamalek
15	DF	Mohamed Tarek	20 April 2002 (aged 22)	(Egyptian Football Association) Al-Masry
16	GK	Ali El Gabry	14 February 2001 (aged 23)	(Egyptian Football Association) Ceramica Cleopatra
17	MF	**Mohamed Elneny*** (captain)	11 July 1992 (aged 32)	(The Football Association) Arsenal
18	FW	Bilal Mazhar	21 November 2003 (aged 20)	(Hellenic Football Federation) Panathinaikos
19	MF	Mohamed Hamdy	26 February 2003 (aged 21)	(Egyptian Football Association) ENPPI

* Overage player.

Unenrolled alternate players
No.	Pos.	Player	Date of birth (age)	Club
20	DF	Ahmed Abdelnaby	20 April 2002 (aged 22)	(Egyptian Football Association) ZED FC
21	DF	Mohamed El Maghrabi	28 April 2001 (aged 23)	(Egyptian Football Association) Smouha
22	GK	Mohamed Seha	1 May 2001 (aged 23)	(Egyptian Football Association) Al-Mokawloon

=== Spain ===
Spain announced their initial 22-men squad on 26 June 2024. The final squad was announced on 10 July.

Head coach: Santi Denia

No.	Pos.	Player	Date of birth (age)	Caps	Goals	Club
1	GK	Arnau Tenas	30 May 2001 (aged 23)	0	0	(French Football Federation) Paris Saint-Germain
2	DF	Marc Pubill	20 June 2003 (aged 21)	0	0	(Royal Spanish Football Federation) Almería
3	DF	**Juan Miranda***	19 January 2000 (aged 24)	5	0	(Royal Spanish Football Federation) Real Betis
4	DF	**Eric García**	9 January 2001 (aged 23)	7	0	(Royal Spanish Football Federation) Girona
5	DF	Pau Cubarsí	22 January 2007 (aged 17)	0	0	(Royal Spanish Football Federation) Barcelona
6	MF	Pablo Barrios	15 June 2003 (aged 21)	0	0	(Royal Spanish Football Federation) Atlético Madrid
7	FW	Diego López	13 May 2002 (aged 22)	0	0	(Royal Spanish Football Federation) Valencia
8	MF	Beñat Turrientes	31 January 2002 (aged 22)	0	0	(Royal Spanish Football Federation) Real Sociedad
9	FW	**Abel Ruiz*** (captain)	28 January 2000 (aged 24)	0	0	(Portuguese Football Federation) Braga
10	MF	**Álex Baena**	20 July 2001 (aged 23)	0	0	(Royal Spanish Football Federation) Villarreal
11	FW	**Fermín López**	11 May 2003 (aged 21)	0	0	(Royal Spanish Football Federation) Barcelona
12	DF	Jon Pacheco	8 January 2001 (aged 23)	0	0	(Royal Spanish Football Federation) Real Sociedad
13	GK	Joan García	4 May 2001 (aged 23)	0	0	(Royal Spanish Football Federation) Espanyol
14	MF	Aimar Oroz	27 November 2001 (aged 22)	0	0	(Royal Spanish Football Federation) Osasuna
15	DF	Miguel Gutiérrez	27 July 2001 (aged 22)	0	0	(Royal Spanish Football Federation) Girona
16	MF	Adrián Bernabé	26 May 2001 (aged 23)	0	0	(Italian Football Federation) Parma
17	FW	Sergio Gómez*	4 September 2000 (aged 23)	0	0	(The Football Association) Manchester City
18	FW	Samu Aghehowa	5 May 2004 (aged 20)	0	0	(Royal Spanish Football Federation) Alavés
19	DF	Cristhian Mosquera	27 June 2004 (aged 20)	0	0	(Royal Spanish Football Federation) Valencia
20	DF	Juanlu Sánchez	15 August 2003 (aged 20)	0	0	(Royal Spanish Football Federation) Sevilla
21	FW	Sergio Camello	10 February 2001 (aged 23)	0	0	(Royal Spanish Football Federation) Rayo Vallecano
22	GK	Alejandro Iturbe	2 September 2003 (aged 20)	0	0	(Royal Spanish Football Federation) Atlético Madrid

* Overage player.

=== Uzbekistan ===
Uzbekistan announced their initial 23-men squad on 3 July 2024. The squad was reduced to 22 players on 9 July.

Head coach: Timur Kapadze

No.	Pos.	Player	Date of birth (age)	Caps	Goals	Club
1	GK	**Abduvohid Nematov**	20 March 2001 (aged 23)	23	0	(Uzbekistan Football Association) Nasaf
2	DF	Saidazamat Mirsaidov	19 July 2001 (aged 23)	26	1	(Uzbekistan Football Association) Olympic Tashkent
3	DF	**Abdukodir Khusanov**	29 February 2004 (aged 20)	6	0	(French Football Federation) Lens
4	DF	**Husniddin Aliqulov***	4 April 1999 (aged 25)	18	0	(Turkish Football Federation) Çaykur Rizespor
5	DF	**Mukhammadkodir Khamraliev**	6 July 2001 (aged 23)	33	2	(Uzbekistan Football Association) Pakhtakor
6	DF	**Ibrokhimkhalil Yuldoshev**	14 February 2001 (aged 23)	20	0	(Kazakhstan Football Federation) Kairat
7	FW	**Abbosbek Fayzullaev**	3 October 2003 (aged 20)	14	3	(Russian Football Union) CSKA Moscow
8	FW	**Ruslanbek Jiyanov**	5 June 2001 (aged 23)	37	3	(Uzbekistan Football Association) Navbahor Namangan
9	FW	**Khusayin Norchaev**	6 February 2002 (aged 22)	32	15	(Uzbekistan Football Association) Neftchi Fergana
10	MF	**Jasurbek Jaloliddinov**	15 May 2002 (aged 22)	44	11	(Uzbekistan Football Association) Neftchi Fergana
11	FW	**Oston Urunov***	29 December 2000 (aged 23)	4	0	(Football Federation Islamic Republic of Iran) Persepolis
12	GK	Vladimir Nazarov	8 June 2002 (aged 22)	23	0	(Uzbekistan Football Association) Pakhtakor
13	DF	**Zafarmurod Abdurakhmatov**	28 April 2003 (aged 21)	4	0	(Uzbekistan Football Association) Nasaf
14	FW	**Eldor Shomurodov*** (captain)	29 June 1995 (aged 29)	3	0	(Italian Football Federation) Cagliari
15	MF	Umarali Rakhmonaliev	18 August 2003 (aged 20)	16	3	(Russian Football Union) Rubin Kazan
16	DF	Asadbek Rakhimjonov	17 February 2004 (aged 20)	14	0	(Uzbekistan Football Association) Olympic Tashkent
17	MF	**Diyor Kholmatov**	22 July 2002 (aged 22)	20	2	(Uzbekistan Football Association) Pakhtakor
18	MF	Abdurauf Buriev	20 July 2002 (aged 22)	33	0	(Uzbekistan Football Association) Olympic Tashkent
19	MF	Ibrokhim Ibrokhimov	12 January 2001 (aged 23)	23	0	(Uzbekistan Football Association) Olympic Tashkent
20	FW	Alisher Odilov	15 July 2001 (aged 23)	34	12	(Uzbekistan Football Association) Olympic Tashkent
21	MF	Bekhruz Askarov	8 March 2003 (aged 21)	4	0	(Uzbekistan Football Association) Pakhtakor

* Overage player.

Unenrolled alternate players
No.	Pos.	Player	Date of birth (age)	Caps	Goals	Club
22	GK	Khamidullo Abdunabiev	20 August 2002 (aged 21)	8	0	(Uzbekistan Football Association) Olympic Tashkent

== Group D ==
=== Israel ===
Israel announced a 29-men preliminary squad on 23 May 2024. The final squad was released on 2 July. Omer Nir'on replaced the injured Daniel Peretz on 18 July, while Roy Sason was called-up as an alternate player.

Head coach: Guy Luzon

No.	Pos.	Player	Date of birth (age)	Caps	Goals	Club
1	GK	Omer Nir'on	17 April 2001 (aged 23)	0	0	(Israel Football Association) Maccabi Netanya
2	DF	Ilay Feingold	23 August 2004 (aged 19)	0	0	(Israel Football Association) Maccabi Haifa
3	DF	**Sean Goldberg***	25 August 1995 (aged 28)	0	0	(Israel Football Association) Maccabi Haifa
4	DF	**Stav Lemkin**	2 April 2003 (aged 21)	0	0	(Ukrainian Association of Football) Shakhtar Donetsk
5	DF	**Roy Revivo**	22 May 2003 (aged 21)	0	0	(Israel Football Association) Maccabi Tel Aviv
6	MF	**Omri Gandelman*** (captain)	16 May 2000 (aged 24)	0	0	(Royal Belgian Football Association) Gent
7	DF	Osher Davida	18 February 2001 (aged 23)	0	0	(Israel Football Association) Maccabi Tel Aviv
8	MF	Ethan Azoulay	26 May 2002 (aged 22)	0	0	(Israel Football Association) Maccabi Netanya
9	FW	**Dor Turgeman**	24 October 2003 (aged 20)	0	0	(Israel Football Association) Maccabi Tel Aviv
10	MF	**Oscar Gloukh**	1 April 2004 (aged 20)	0	0	(Austrian Football Association) Red Bull Salzburg
11	FW	**Liel Abada**	3 October 2001 (aged 22)	0	0	(United States Soccer Federation) Charlotte FC
12	DF	Noam Ben Harush	13 May 2005 (aged 19)	0	0	(Israel Football Association) Hapoel Haifa
13	FW	Elad Madmon	10 February 2004 (aged 20)	0	0	(Israel Football Association) Maccabi Tel Aviv
14	MF	Ayano Preda	29 April 2002 (aged 22)	0	0	(Israel Football Association) Hapoel Jerusalem
15	MF	Adi Yona	17 April 2004 (aged 20)	0	0	(Israel Football Association) Beitar Jerusalem
16	DF	Or Israelov	2 September 2004 (aged 19)	0	0	(Israel Football Association) Hapoel Tel Aviv
17	MF	Ido Shahar	20 August 2001 (aged 22)	0	0	(Israel Football Association) Maccabi Tel Aviv
18	GK	Niv Eliasi	1 February 2002 (aged 22)	0	0	(Israel Football Association) Hapoel Be'er Sheva
22	GK	Roy Sason	13 December 2001 (aged 22)	0	0	(Israel Football Association) Bnei Yehuda Tel Aviv

* Overage player.

Unenrolled alternate players
No.	Pos.	Player	Date of birth (age)	Caps	Goals	Club
19	FW	**Idan Gorno**	9 August 2004 (aged 19)	0	0	(Israel Football Association) Maccabi Petah Tikva
20	MF	Niv Yehoshua	28 January 2005 (aged 19)	0	0	(Israel Football Association) Maccabi Petah Tikva
21	DF	Noam Malmoud	2 August 2002 (aged 21)	0	0	(Israel Football Association) Hapoel Jerusalem

=== Japan ===
Japan announced their final squad on 3 July 2024. Kodai Sano withdrew on 23 July after being recalled by his club and was replaced by Asahi Uenaka in the alternative list. On the following day, Kaito Suzuki replaced the injured Riku Handa, while Takashi Uchino was called-up as an alternate player.

Head coach: Gō Ōiwa

No.	Pos.	Player	Date of birth (age)	Club
1	GK	Leo Kokubo	23 January 2001 (aged 23)	(Portuguese Football Federation) Benfica
2	DF	Kaito Suzuki	25 August 2002 (aged 21)	(Japan Football Association) Júbilo Iwata
3	DF	Ryūya Nishio	16 May 2001 (aged 23)	(Japan Football Association) Cerezo Osaka
4	DF	Hiroki Sekine	11 August 2002 (aged 21)	(Japan Football Association) Kashiwa Reysol
5	DF	Seiji Kimura	24 August 2001 (aged 22)	(Japan Football Association) Sagan Tosu
6	MF	Sota Kawasaki	30 July 2001 (aged 22)	(Japan Football Association) Kyoto Sanga
7	MF	Rihito Yamamoto	12 December 2001 (aged 22)	(Royal Belgian Football Association) Sint-Truiden
8	MF	**Joel Chima Fujita** (captain)	16 February 2002 (aged 22)	(Royal Belgian Football Association) Sint-Truiden
9	FW	Shōta Fujio	2 May 2001 (aged 23)	(Japan Football Association) Machida Zelvia
10	MF	Koki Saito	10 August 2001 (aged 22)	(Royal Dutch Football Association) Sparta Rotterdam
11	FW	**Mao Hosoya**	7 September 2001 (aged 22)	(Japan Football Association) Kashiwa Reysol
12	GK	Taishi Brandon Nozawa	25 December 2002 (aged 21)	(Japan Football Association) FC Tokyo
13	MF	Ryotaro Araki	29 January 2002 (aged 22)	(Japan Football Association) FC Tokyo
14	MF	Shunsuke Mito	28 September 2002 (aged 21)	(Royal Dutch Football Association) Sparta Rotterdam
15	DF	Kota Takai	4 September 2004 (aged 19)	(Japan Football Association) Kawasaki Frontale
16	DF	Ayumu Ohata	27 April 2001 (aged 23)	(Japan Football Association) Urawa Red Diamonds
17	FW	Yu Hirakawa	3 January 2001 (aged 23)	(Japan Football Association) Machida Zelvia
18	FW	Kein Sato	11 July 2001 (aged 23)	(German Football Association) Werder Bremen
19	FW	Asahi Uenaka	1 November 2001 (aged 22)	(Japan Football Association) Yokohama F. Marinos
20	MF	Fuki Yamada	10 July 2001 (aged 23)	(Japan Football Association) Tokyo Verdy
21	DF	Takashi Uchino	7 March 2001 (aged 23)	(German Football Association) Fortuna Düsseldorf

Unenrolled alternate players
No.	Pos.	Player	Date of birth (age)	Club
22	GK	Masato Sasaki	1 May 2002 (aged 22)	(Japan Football Association) Kashiwa Reysol

=== Mali ===
Mali announced their final squad on 8 July 2024.

Head coach: Alou Badra Diallo

No.	Pos.	Player	Date of birth (age)	Club
1	GK	Lassine Diarra	11 November 2002 (aged 21)	(French Football Federation) Lyon
2	DF	Fodé Doucouré	3 February 2001 (aged 23)	(French Football Federation) Red Star
3	DF	Hamidou Diallo	26 January 2002 (aged 22)	(Portuguese Football Federation) Farense
4	DF	Mamadou Tounkara	14 December 2001 (aged 22)	(Portuguese Football Federation) Vitória de Guimarães
5	DF	Ibrahima Cissé	15 February 2001 (aged 23)	(German Football Association) Schalke 04
6	MF	Coli Saco	15 May 2002 (aged 22)	(Italian Football Federation) Ancona
7	FW	Wilson Samaké	30 March 2004 (aged 20)	(French Football Federation) Rennes
8	MF	**Boubacar Traoré** (captain)	20 August 2001 (aged 22)	(The Football Association) Wolverhampton Wanderers
9	FW	Cheickna Doumbia	14 June 2003 (aged 21)	(United Arab Emirates Football Association) Shabab Al-Ahli
10	MF	Salam Jiddou*	1 February 2000 (aged 24)	(Algerian Football Federation) ES Sétif
11	FW	Thiemoko Diarra	19 April 2003 (aged 21)	(French Football Federation) Châteauroux
12	MF	Issouf Sissokho	30 January 2002 (aged 22)	(French Football Federation) Bordeaux
13	MF	Brahima Diarra	5 July 2003 (aged 21)	(The Football Association) Huddersfield Town
14	FW	**Demba Diallo***	13 October 2000 (aged 23)	(Turkish Football Federation) Manisa
15	DF	Mohamed Cisset	28 May 2004 (aged 20)	(United States Soccer Federation) Penn State Nittany Lions
16	GK	Oumar Coulibaly	19 December 2002 (aged 21)	(Malian Football Federation) CO Bamako
17	DF	Ahmed Diomandé	15 December 2002 (aged 21)	(Royal Moroccan Football Federation) Ittifaq Marrakech
18	MF	Moussa Diakité	4 November 2003 (aged 20)	(Royal Spanish Football Federation) Cádiz

* Overage player.

Unenrolled alternate players
No.	Pos.	Player	Date of birth (age)	Club
19	MF	Mohamadou Lamine Bah	23 October 2001 (aged 22)	(Tunisian Football Federation) Olympique Béja
20	FW	Issoufi Maïga	12 February 2002 (aged 22)	(Portuguese Football Federation) Académico de Viseu
21	MF	Fady Sidiki Coulibaly	27 January 2002 (aged 22)	(Malian Football Federation) Stade Malien
22	GK	Hassane Sadawie Diarra	30 November 2004 (aged 19)	(Malian Football Federation) Real Bamako

=== Paraguay ===
Paraguay announced their final squad on 3 July 2024. Gatito Fernández and Fabián Balbuena were added to the squad on 9 July, replacing the injured Ángel González and Gustavo Caballero. On 15 July, Fabrizio Peralta withdrew injured and was replaced by Julio Enciso. On 23 July, Diego González withdrew injured and was replaced by Gustavo Caballero, while Ángel Cardozo Lucena was called-up as an alternate player.

Head coach: Carlos Jara Saguier

No.	Pos.	Player	Date of birth (age)	Club
1	GK	**Gatito Fernández***	29 March 1988 (aged 36)	(Brazilian Football Confederation) Botafogo
2	DF	Alan Núñez	1 October 2004 (aged 19)	(Paraguayan Football Association) Cerro Porteño
3	DF	Ronaldo De Jesús	21 April 2001 (aged 23)	(Paraguayan Football Association) Cerro Porteño
4	DF	Daniel Rivas	6 December 2001 (aged 22)	(Paraguayan Football Association) Nacional
5	DF	Gilberto Flores	1 April 2003 (aged 21)	(Paraguayan Football Association) Sportivo Trinidense
6	MF	Marcos Gómez	10 November 2001 (aged 22)	(Paraguayan Football Association) Olimpia
7	FW	Marcelo Fernández	25 October 2001 (aged 22)	(Paraguayan Football Association) Libertad
8	MF	**Diego Gómez** (captain)	27 March 2003 (aged 21)	(United States Soccer Federation) Inter Miami
9	FW	Kevin Parzajuk	9 August 2002 (aged 21)	(Paraguayan Football Association) Olimpia
10	MF	Wilder Viera	4 March 2002 (aged 22)	(Paraguayan Football Association) Cerro Porteño
11	FW	Enso González	20 January 2005 (aged 19)	(The Football Association) Wolverhampton Wanderers
12	GK	Rodrigo Frutos	6 January 2003 (aged 21)	(Paraguayan Football Association) Olimpia
13	DF	Alexis Cantero	5 February 2003 (aged 21)	(Paraguayan Football Association) Guaraní
14	DF	**Fabián Balbuena***	23 August 1991 (aged 32)	(Russian Football Union) Dynamo Moscow
15	MF	**Julio Enciso**	23 January 2004 (aged 20)	(The Football Association) Brighton & Hove Albion
16	DF	Fernando Román	23 February 2001 (aged 23)	(Paraguayan Football Association) Guaraní
17	FW	Gustavo Caballero	21 September 2001 (aged 22)	(Paraguayan Football Association) Nacional
18	FW	Marcelo Pérez	23 March 2001 (aged 23)	(Argentine Football Association) Huracán
20	MF	**Ángel Cardozo Lucena***	19 October 1994 (aged 29)	(Paraguayan Football Association) Libertad

* Overage player.

Unenrolled alternate players
No.	Pos.	Player	Date of birth (age)	Club
19	FW	Tiago Caballero	27 May 2005 (aged 18)	(Paraguayan Football Association) Nacional
21	MF	Rubén Lezcano	9 February 2004 (aged 20)	(Paraguayan Football Association) Libertad
22	GK	Facundo Insfrán	4 May 2006 (aged 18)	(Paraguayan Football Association) Olimpia
