= Uzbekistan at the 2024 Summer Olympics =

- IOC code: UZB
- NOC: National Olympic Committee of the Republic of Uzbekistan
- Website: www.olympic.uz (in Uzbek, Russian, and English)

in Paris, France 26 July 2024 – 11 August 2024
- Competitors: 85 (54 men and 31 women) in 16 sports
- Flag bearers (opening): Abdumalik Khalokov & Zaynab Dayibekova
- Flag bearer (closing): Ulugbek Rashitov
- Medals Ranked 13th: Gold 8 Silver 2 Bronze 3 Total 13

Summer Olympics appearances (overview)
- 1996; 2000; 2004; 2008; 2012; 2016; 2020; 2024; 2028

Other related appearances
- Russian Empire (1900–1912); Soviet Union (1952–1988); Unified Team (1992)

Uzbekistan competed at the 2024 Summer Olympics in Paris, which took place from 26 July 2024 to 11 August 2024. It was the nation's eighth consecutive appearance at the Summer Olympics in the post-Soviet era.

With eight gold medals, this was Uzbekistan's most successful performance in the Summer Olympics, also matching their 2016 Summer Olympics total medal count of 13. It was also the highest total number of gold medals in a former Soviet territory, with Russia and Belarus banned from the Olympics due to sanctions on the Russian invasion of Ukraine.

== Medalists ==
| Medal | Name | Sport | Event | Date |
|---|---|---|---|---|
| Gold | Diyora Keldiyorova | Judo | Women's 52 kg | 28 July |
| Gold | Ulugbek Rashitov | Taekwondo | Men's 68 kg | 8 August |
| Gold | Hasanboy Dusmatov | Boxing | Men's flyweight | 8 August |
| Gold | Asadkhuja Muydinkhujaev | Boxing | Men's welterweight | 9 August |
| Gold | Lazizbek Mullojonov | Boxing | Men's heavyweight | 9 August |
| Gold | Razambek Zhamalov | Wrestling | Men's freestyle 74 kg | 10 August |
| Gold | Abdumalik Khalokov | Boxing | Men's featherweight | 10 August |
| Gold | Bakhodir Jalolov | Boxing | Men's super heavyweight | 10 August |
| Silver | Akbar Djuraev | Weightlifting | Men's 102 kg | 10 August |
| Silver | Svetlana Osipova | Taekwondo | Women's +67 kg | 10 August |
| Bronze | Muzaffarbek Turoboyev | Judo | Men's 100 kg | 1 August |
| Bronze | Alisher Yusupov | Judo | Men's +100 kg | 2 August |
| Bronze | Gulomjon Abdullaev | Wrestling | Men's freestyle 57 kg | 9 August |

Medals by sport
| Sport | 1st place, gold medalist(s) | 2nd place, silver medalist(s) | 3rd place, bronze medalist(s) | Total |
| Boxing | 5 | 0 | 0 | 5 |
| Taekwondo | 1 | 1 | 0 | 2 |
| Judo | 1 | 0 | 2 | 3 |
| Wrestling | 1 | 0 | 1 | 2 |
| Weightlifting | 0 | 1 | 0 | 1 |
| Total | 8 | 2 | 3 | 13 |

Medals by gender
| Gender | 1st place, gold medalist(s) | 2nd place, silver medalist(s) | 3rd place, bronze medalist(s) | Total |
| Female | 1 | 1 | 0 | 2 |
| Male | 7 | 1 | 3 | 11 |
| Mixed | 0 | 0 | 0 | 0 |
| Total | 8 | 2 | 3 | 13 |

Medals by date
| Date | 1st place, gold medalist(s) | 2nd place, silver medalist(s) | 3rd place, bronze medalist(s) | Total |
| 28 July | 1 | 0 | 0 | 1 |
| 29 July | 0 | 0 | 0 | 0 |
| 30 July | 0 | 0 | 0 | 0 |
| 31 July | 0 | 0 | 0 | 0 |
| 01 August | 0 | 0 | 1 | 1 |
| 02 August | 0 | 0 | 1 | 1 |
| 03 August | 0 | 0 | 0 | 0 |
| 04 August | 0 | 0 | 0 | 0 |
| 05 August | 0 | 0 | 0 | 0 |
| 06 August | 0 | 0 | 0 | 0 |
| 07 August | 0 | 0 | 0 | 0 |
| 08 August | 2 | 0 | 0 | 2 |
| 09 August | 2 | 0 | 1 | 3 |
| 10 August | 3 | 2 | 0 | 5 |
| Total | 8 | 2 | 3 | 13 |

== Competitors ==
The following is the list of the number of competitors in the Games.

| Sport | Men | Women | Total Athletes |
|---|---|---|---|
| Archery | 1 | 1 | 2 |
| Athletics | 2 | 2 | 4 |
| Boxing | 7 | 4 | 11 |
| Canoeing | 1 | 2 | 3 |
| Cycling | 1 | 2 | 3 |
| Diving | 1 | 0 | 1 |
| Fencing | 0 | 1 | 1 |
| Football | 18 | 0 | 18 |
| Gymnastics | 3 | 6 | 9 |
| Judo | 7 | 5 | 12 |
| Modern pentathlon | 0 | 1 | 1 |
| Rowing | 2 | 1 | 3 |
| Swimming | 1 | 1 | 2 |
| Taekwondo | 3 | 2 | 5 |
| Weightlifting | 1 | 2 | 3 |
| Wrestling | 6 | 1 | 7 |
| Total | 54 | 31 | 85 |

== Archery ==
Two Uzbekistani archers qualified for the 2024 Summer Olympics men's and women's individual recurve competitions by virtue of their result at the 2023 Asian Continental Qualification Tournament in Bangkok, Thailand; and 2024 Final Qualification Tournament in Antalya, Turkey.

| Athlete | Event | Ranking round | | Round of 64 | Round of 32 | Round of 16 | Quarterfinals | Semifinals | Final / BM | |
| Athlete | Event | Score | Seed | Opposition Score | Opposition Score | Opposition Score | Opposition Score | Opposition Score | Opposition Score | Rank |
|---|---|---|---|---|---|---|---|---|---|---|
| Amirkhon Sadikov | Men's individual | 674 | 13 | Jajarabilla (ARG); W 6–2 | Nespoli (ITA); L 4–6 | Did not advance | | | | |
| Ziyodakhon Abdusattorova | Women's individual | 649 | 34 | Horáčková (CZE); L 2–6 | Did not advance | | | | | |
| Amirkhon Sadikov; Ziyodakhon Abdusattorova | Mixed team | 1323 | 14 Q | —N/a | | United States; L 0–6 | Did not advance | | | |

== Athletics ==
Uzbek track and field athletes achieved the entry standards for Paris 2024, either by passing the direct qualifying mark (or time for track and road races) or by world ranking, in the following events (a maximum of 3 athletes each):

Key

- Note–Ranks given for track events are within the athlete's heat only
- Q = Qualified for the next round
- q = Qualified for the next round as a fastest loser or, in field events, by position without achieving the qualifying target
- NR = National record
- N/A = Round not applicable for the event
- Bye = Athlete not required to compete in round

Track and road events

| Athlete | Event | Final | |
| Athlete | Event | Result | Rank |
|---|---|---|---|
| Shokhrukh Davlatov | Men's marathon | DNF | —N/a |

Field events

| Athlete | Event | Qualification | | Final | |
| Athlete | Event | Distance | Position | Distance | Position |
|---|---|---|---|---|---|
| Anvar Anvarov | Men's long jump | 7.77 | 20 | Did not advance | |
| Safina Sadullayeva | Women's high jump | 1.95 | 5 Q | 1.95 | 7 |
| Sharifa Davronova | Women's triple jump | 13.74 | 23 | Did not advance | |

== Boxing ==
Uzbekistan entered eleven boxers into the Olympic tournament. Five of them qualified for Paris in their respective divisions by advancing to the semifinals and finals round at the 2022 Asian Games in Hangzhou, China. Later on, the nation secured five additional quotas through the excellent performances at the 2024 World Olympic Qualification Tournament 1 in Busto Arsizio, Italy. Navbakhor Khamidova (women's welterweight) secured her spot following the triumph in quota bouts round at the 2024 World Olympic Qualification Tournament 2 in Bangkok, Thailand. During the tournament, Uzbekistan's head boxing coach Tulkin Kilichev suffered a cardiac arrest while celebrating Hasanboy Dusmatov's gold medal victory. GB Boxing doctor Harj Singh and physiotherapist Robbie Lillis provided emergency treatment, including CPR and use of a defibrillator, and Kilichev was later reported to be in stable condition.

Men

| Athlete | Event | Round of 32 | Round of 16 | Quarterfinals | Semifinals | Final | |
| Athlete | Event | Opposition Result | Opposition Result | Opposition Result | Opposition Result | Opposition Result | Rank |
|---|---|---|---|---|---|---|---|
| Hasanboy Dusmatov | Men's 51 kg | Bye | López Jr. (PUR); W 5–0 | Bibossinov (KAZ); W 3–2 | de Pina (CPV); W 5–0 | Bennama (FRA); W 5–0 | 1st place, gold medalist(s) |
| Abdumalik Khalokov | Men's 57 kg | Bye | Ibrahim (SWE); W 5–0 | Quiles (ESP); W 5–0 | Senior (AUS); W 5–0 | Seiitbek Uulu (KGZ); W 5–0 | 1st place, gold medalist(s) |
| Ruslan Abdullaev | Men's 63.5 kg | Bye | Ramírez (MEX); W 5–0 | Sanford (CAN); L 1–4 | Did not advance | | |
| Asadkhuja Muydinkhujaev | Men's 71 kg | Bye | Elawady (EGY); W 5–0 | Terteryan (DEN); W 5–0 | Jones (USA); W 3–2 | Verde (MEX); W 5–0 | 1st place, gold medalist(s) |
| Turabek Khabibullaev | Men's 80 kg | Bye | Marcial (PHI); W 5–0 | López (CUB); L 2–3 | Did not advance | | |
| Lazizbek Mullojonov | Men's 92 kg | —N/a | Mouhidine (ITA); W 4–1 | Machado (BRA); W 5–0 | Boltaev (TJK); W 4–1 | Alfonso (AZE); W 5–0 | 1st place, gold medalist(s) |
| Bakhodir Jalolov | Men's +92 kg | —N/a | Shiha (NOR); W 5–0 | Teremoana (AUS); W 5–0 | Tiafack (GER); W 5–0 | Ghadfa (ESP); W 5–0 | 1st place, gold medalist(s) |

Women

| Athlete | Event | Round of 32 | Round of 16 | Quarterfinals | Semifinals | Final | |
| Athlete | Event | Opposition Result | Opposition Result | Opposition Result | Opposition Result | Opposition Result | Rank |
|---|---|---|---|---|---|---|---|
| Sabina Bobokulova | Women's 50 kg | —N/a | Raksat (THA); L 0–5 | Did not advance | | | |
| Nigina Uktamova | Women's 54 kg | Ayyad (EGY); WO | Pang C-m (PRK); L 0–5 | Did not advance | | | |
| Sitora Turdibekova | Women's 57 kg | Sakobi (COD); W 3–2 | Lin Y-t (TPE); L 0–5 | Did not advance | | | |
| Navbakhor Khamidova | Women's 66 kg | —N/a | McCane (USA); W 3–2 | Chen N-ch (TPE); L 0–5 | Did not advance | | |

== Canoeing ==
=== Sprint ===
Uzbekistani canoeists qualified three boats for the Games through the result of highest rank eligible nations in the following events, through the 2024 Asian Sprint Canoeing Championships in Tokyo, Japan.

| Athlete | Event | Heats | | Quarterfinals | | Semifinals | | Final | |
| Athlete | Event | Time | Rank | Time | Rank | Time | Rank | Time | Rank |
|---|---|---|---|---|---|---|---|---|---|
| Shakhriyor Makhkamov | Men's K-1 1000 m | 3:40.25 | 3 | 3:35.43 | 3 | Did not advance | | | |
| Ekaterina Shubina | Women's K-1 500 m | 1:58.37 | 6 QF | 1:54.63 | 6 | Did not advance | | | |
| Nilufar Zokirova | Women's C-1 200 m | 48.98 | 3 | 48.47 | 3 | Did not advance | | | |

Qualification Legend: FA = Qualify to final (medal); FB = Qualify to final B (non-medal)

== Cycling ==
=== Road ===
Uzbekistan entered one male and two female riders to compete in the road race events at the Olympics. Uzbekistan secured those quota through the UCI Nation Ranking.

| Athlete | Event | Time | Rank |
|---|---|---|---|
| Nikita Tsvetkov | Men's road race | DNF | |
| Yanina Kuskova | Women's road race | 4:07:16 | 51 |
| Olga Zabelinskaya | Women's road race | 4:10:47 | 70 |
| Olga Zabelinskaya | Women's time trial | 43:53.51 | 23 |

== Diving ==
Uzbekistan entered one diver at Paris 2024. The nation gained the quota by virtue of being the top twelve ranked individual in men's platform, not yet qualified, at the 2024 World Aquatics Championships in Doha, Qatar, marking the nation's debut in this sport.

| Athlete | Event | Preliminary | | Semifinal | | Final | |
| Athlete | Event | Points | Rank | Points | Rank | Points | Rank |
|---|---|---|---|---|---|---|---|
| Igor Myalin | Men's 10 m platform | 357.10 | 21 | Did not advance | | | |

== Fencing ==
Uzbekistan entered one fencer into the Olympic competition. Zaynab Dayibekova secured her quota places in women's sabre events after being nominated as one of the two highest-ranked individual fencers, eligible for the Asia & Oceania zone through the release of the FIE Official ranking for Paris 2024.

| Athlete | Event | Round of 64 | Round of 32 | Round of 16 | Quarterfinal | Semifinal | Final / BM | |
| Athlete | Event | Opposition Score | Opposition Score | Opposition Score | Opposition Score | Opposition Score | Opposition Score | Rank |
|---|---|---|---|---|---|---|---|---|
| Zaynab Dayibekova | Women's sabre | Bye | Yoon J-s (KOR); L 11–15 | Did not advance | | | | |

== Football ==
Summary

Key:

- A.E.T – After extra time.
- P – Match decided by penalty-shootout.

| Team | Event | Group Stage | | | | Quarterfinal | Semifinal | Final / BM | |
| Team | Event | Opposition Score | Opposition Score | Opposition Score | Rank | Opposition Score | Opposition Score | Opposition Score | Rank |
|---|---|---|---|---|---|---|---|---|---|
| Uzbekistan men's | Men's tournament | Spain; L 1–2 | Egypt; L 0–1 | Dominican Republic; D 1–1 | 4 | Did not advance | | | 13 |

=== Men's tournament ===
Uzbekistan men's football team qualified for the Olympics by advancing to the finals of the 2024 AFC U-23 Asian Cup in Doha, Qatar.

Team roster

Uzbekistan announced their initial 23-men squad on 3 July 2024. The squad was reduced to 22 players on 9 July.

Head coach: Timur Kapadze

| No. | Pos. | Player | Date of birth (age) | Caps | Goals | Club |
|---|---|---|---|---|---|---|
| 1 | GK | Abduvohid Nematov | 20 March 2001 (aged 23) | 23 | 0 | (Uzbekistan Football Association) Nasaf |
| 2 | DF | Saidazamat Mirsaidov | 19 July 2001 (aged 23) | 26 | 1 | (Uzbekistan Football Association) Olympic Tashkent |
| 3 | DF | Abdukodir Khusanov | 29 February 2004 (aged 20) | 6 | 0 | (French Football Federation) Lens |
| 4 | DF | Husniddin Aliqulov* | 4 April 1999 (aged 25) | 18 | 0 | (Turkish Football Federation) Çaykur Rizespor |
| 5 | DF | Mukhammadkodir Khamraliev | 6 July 2001 (aged 23) | 33 | 2 | (Uzbekistan Football Association) Pakhtakor |
| 6 | DF | Ibrokhimkhalil Yuldoshev | 14 February 2001 (aged 23) | 20 | 0 | (Kazakhstan Football Federation) Kairat |
| 7 | FW | Abbosbek Fayzullaev | 3 October 2003 (aged 20) | 14 | 3 | (Russian Football Union) CSKA Moscow |
| 8 | FW | Ruslanbek Jiyanov | 5 June 2001 (aged 23) | 37 | 3 | (Uzbekistan Football Association) Navbahor Namangan |
| 9 | FW | Khusayin Norchaev | 6 February 2002 (aged 22) | 32 | 15 | (Uzbekistan Football Association) Neftchi Fergana |
| 10 | MF | Jasurbek Jaloliddinov | 15 May 2002 (aged 22) | 44 | 11 | (Uzbekistan Football Association) Neftchi Fergana |
| 11 | FW | Oston Urunov* | 29 December 2000 (aged 23) | 4 | 0 | (Football Federation Islamic Republic of Iran) Persepolis |
| 12 | GK | Vladimir Nazarov | 8 June 2002 (aged 22) | 23 | 0 | (Uzbekistan Football Association) Pakhtakor |
| 13 | DF | Zafarmurod Abdurakhmatov | 28 April 2003 (aged 21) | 4 | 0 | (Uzbekistan Football Association) Nasaf |
| 14 | FW | Eldor Shomurodov* (captain) | 29 June 1995 (aged 29) | 3 | 0 | (Italian Football Federation) Cagliari |
| 15 | MF | Umarali Rakhmonaliev | 18 August 2003 (aged 20) | 16 | 3 | (Russian Football Union) Rubin Kazan |
| 16 | DF | Asadbek Rakhimjonov | 17 February 2004 (aged 20) | 14 | 0 | (Uzbekistan Football Association) Olympic Tashkent |
| 17 | MF | Diyor Kholmatov | 22 July 2002 (aged 22) | 20 | 2 | (Uzbekistan Football Association) Pakhtakor |
| 18 | MF | Abdurauf Buriev | 20 July 2002 (aged 22) | 33 | 0 | (Uzbekistan Football Association) Olympic Tashkent |
| 19 | MF | Ibrokhim Ibrokhimov | 12 January 2001 (aged 23) | 23 | 0 | (Uzbekistan Football Association) Olympic Tashkent |
| 20 | FW | Alisher Odilov | 15 July 2001 (aged 23) | 34 | 12 | (Uzbekistan Football Association) Olympic Tashkent |
| 21 | MF | Bekhruz Askarov | 8 March 2003 (aged 21) | 4 | 0 | (Uzbekistan Football Association) Pakhtakor |

* Overage player.

Group play

| Pos | Team | Pld | W | D | L | GF | GA | GD | Pts | Qualification |
|---|---|---|---|---|---|---|---|---|---|---|
| 1 | Egypt | 3 | 2 | 1 | 0 | 3 | 1 | +2 | 7 | Advance to knockout stage |
| 2 | Spain | 3 | 2 | 0 | 1 | 6 | 4 | +2 | 6 | Advance to knockout stage |
| 3 | Dominican Republic | 3 | 0 | 2 | 1 | 2 | 4 | −2 | 2 | |
| 4 | Uzbekistan | 3 | 0 | 1 | 2 | 2 | 4 | −2 | 1 | |

Source: FIFA
Rules for classification: Group stage tiebreakers
24 July 2024
15:00

| Uzbekistan | 1–2 | Spain |
|---|---|---|
| Shomurodov 45+3' (pen.) | Report | Pubill 28'; Gómez 62' |

Parc des Princes, Paris
Attendance: 33,732
Referee: Dahane Beida (Mauritania)

27 July 2024
17:00

| Uzbekistan | 0–1 | Egypt |
|---|---|---|
| | Report | Koka 11' |

Stade de la Beaujoire, Nantes
Attendance: 20,658
Referee: Campbell-Kirk Kawana-Waugh (New Zealand)

30 July 2024
15:00

| Dominican Republic | 1–1 | Uzbekistan |
|---|---|---|
| Núñez 51' (pen.) | Report | Odilov 58' |

Parc des Princes, Paris
Attendance: 30,475
Referee: Mahmood Ismail (Sudan)

== Gymnastics ==
=== Artistic ===
Uzbekistan qualified three artistic gymnasts into the games. Rasuljon Abdurakhimov directly secured his quota to compete at the Olympics by being one of the highest-ranked eligible athletes in the men's parallel bars through the final accumulations of the 2024 Apparatus World Cup Series rankings. Khabibullo Ergashev received the reallocated host nation spot after French gymnast Samir Aït Saïd qualified via the aforementioned World Cup series. Abdulla Azimov earned a berth after finishing third at the 2024 Asian Championships, but first among non-qualified gymnasts.

Men

| Athlete | Event | Qualification | | | | | | | | Final | | | | | | | |
| Athlete | Event | Apparatus | | | | | | Total | Rank | Apparatus | | | | | | Total | Rank |
| Athlete | Event | F | PH | R | V | PB | HB | Total | Rank | F | PH | R | V | PB | HB | Total | Rank |
|---|---|---|---|---|---|---|---|---|---|---|---|---|---|---|---|---|---|
| Rasuljon Abdurakhimov | Parallel bars | —N/a | | | | 14.466 | —N/a | 14.466 | 22 | Did not advance | | | | | | | |
| Abdulla Azimov | All-around | 12.966 | 14.4 | 12.166 | 13.866 | 13.766 | 12.8 | 79.498 | 28 R2 | Did not advance | | | | | | | |
| Khabibullo Ergashev | All-around | 13.1 | 13.833 | 12.466 | 12.9 | 13.733 | 12.466 | 78.498 | 41 | Did not advance | | | | | | | |

=== Rhythmic ===
Uzbekistan qualified six rhythmic gymnasts. Takhmina Ikromova qualified for the individual all-around through the nation's results at the 2023 World Championship in Valencia, Spain; meanwhile Uzbekistani women's group qualified for the games following the triumph of winning the gold medal, at the 2024 Asian Championships in Tashkent.

| Athlete | Event | Qualification | | | | | | Final | | | | | |
| Athlete | Event | Hoop | Ball | Clubs | Ribbon | Total | Rank | Hoop | Ball | Clubs | Ribbon | Total | Rank |
|---|---|---|---|---|---|---|---|---|---|---|---|---|---|
| Takhmina Ikromova | Individual | 31.700 | 32.350 | 30.350 | 32.000 | 126.400 | 14 R4 | Did not advance | | | | | |

| Athletes | Event | Qualification | | | | Final | | | |
| Athletes | Event | 5 apps | 3+2 apps | Total | Rank | 5 apps. | 3+2 apps | Total | Rank |
|---|---|---|---|---|---|---|---|---|---|
| Evelina Atalyants; Shakhzoda Ibragimova; Mumtozabonu Iskhokzoda; Amaliya Mamedova; Irodakhon Sadikova | Group | 33.550 (10) | 30.450 (7) | 64.000 | 7 Q | 34.050 (8) | 30.450 (6) | 64.500 | 8 |

== Judo ==
Uzbekistan has qualified eleven judokas via the IJF World Ranking List and continental quotas in Asia.

Men

| Athlete | Event | Round of 64 | Round of 32 | Round of 16 | Quarterfinals | Semifinals | Repechage | Final / BM | |
| Athlete | Event | Opposition Result | Opposition Result | Opposition Result | Opposition Result | Opposition Result | Opposition Result | Opposition Result | Rank |
|---|---|---|---|---|---|---|---|---|---|
| Dilshodbek Baratov | Men's −60 kg | —N/a | Khalmatov (UKR); L 00–01 | Did not advance | | | | | |
| Sardor Nurillaev | Men's −66 kg | —N/a | Lima (BRA); L 00–01 | Did not advance | | | | | |
| Murodjon Yuldoshev | Men's −73 kg | —N/a | Shamsayev (KAZ); W 10–00 | Osmanov (MDA); L 00–10 | Did not advance | | | | |
| Sharofiddin Boltaboev | Men's −81 kg | Bye | ~~Sehen (IRQ)~~; DQB w/o | Djalo (FRA); W 10–00 | Lee J-h (KOR); L 00–10 | Did not advance | Makhmadbekov (TJK); L 00–10 | Did not advance | |
| Davlat Bobonov | Men's −90 kg | —N/a | Grigorian (UAE); L 00–10 | Did not advance | | | | | |
| Muzaffarbek Turoboyev | Men's −100 kg | —N/a | Bye | Sharkhan (KAZ); W 11–01 | Korrel (NED); W 11–00 | Kotsoiev (AZE); L 00–01 | —N/a | Sherazadishvili (ESP); W 10–00 | 3rd place, bronze medalist(s) |
| Alisher Yusupov | Men's +100 kg | —N/a | Bye | Fízeľ (SVK); W 10–00 | Rakhimov (TJK); L 01–11 | —N/a | Tushishvili (GEO); W/O DSQ | Saito (JPN); W 11–00 | 3rd place, bronze medalist(s) |

Women

| Athlete | Event | Round of 64 | Round of 32 | Round of 16 | Quarterfinals | Semifinals | Repechage | Final / BM | |
| Athlete | Event | Opposition Result | Opposition Result | Opposition Result | Opposition Result | Opposition Result | Opposition Result | Opposition Result | Rank |
|---|---|---|---|---|---|---|---|---|---|
| Khalimajon Kurbonova | Women's −48 kg | —N/a | Aliyeva (AZE); W 01–00 | Babulfath (SWE); L 00–10 | Did not advance | | | | |
| Diyora Keldiyorova | Women's −52 kg | —N/a | Bye | Abe (JPN); W 10–01 | Ballhaus (GER); W 10–00 | Buchard (FRA); W 01–00 | —N/a | Krasniqi (KOS); W 01–00 | 1st place, gold medalist(s) |
| Shukurjon Aminova | Women's −57 kg | —N/a | Dabonne (CIV); W 10–00 | Liparteliani (GEO); L 00–01 | Did not advance | | | | |
| Gulnoza Matniyazova | Women's −70 kg | —N/a | Mun S-h (PRK); W 10–00 | Niizoe (JPN); L 00–10 | Did not advance | | | | |
| Iriskhon Kurbanbaeva | Women's −78 kg | —N/a | Bye | Takayama (JPN); L 00–10 | Did not advance | | | | |

Mixed

| Athlete | Event | Round of 32 | Round of 16 | Quarterfinals | Semifinals | Repechage | Final / BM | |
| Athlete | Event | Opposition Result | Opposition Result | Opposition Result | Opposition Result | Opposition Result | Opposition Result | Rank |
|---|---|---|---|---|---|---|---|---|
| Shukurjon Aminova; Murodjon Yuldoshev; Gulnoza Matniyazova; Davlat Bobonov; Iriskhon Kurbanbaeva; Alisher Yusupov | Team | Bye | Canada; W 4–0 | Italy; L 2–4 | —N/a | South Korea; L 2–4 | Did not advance | |

== Modern pentathlon ==
Uzbekistani modern pentathletes confirmed a single quota place for the Olympic games. Alise Fakhrutdinova secured her spots in the women's event by virtue of the top five eligible nations through the 2022 Asian Games in Hangzhou, China.

| Athlete | Event | | Fencing (épée one touch) | | | | Riding (show jumping) | | | Swimming (200 m freestyle) | | | Combined: shooting/running (10 m laser pistol)/(3000 m) | | | Total points | Final rank |
| Athlete | Event | | RR | BR | Rank | MP points | Penalties | Rank | MP points | Time | Rank | MP points | Time | Rank | MP points | Total points | Final rank |
|---|---|---|---|---|---|---|---|---|---|---|---|---|---|---|---|---|---|
| Alise Fakhrutdinova | Women's | Semifinal | 19–16 | 2 | 5 | 222 | 7 | 9 | 293 | 2:21.30 | 14 | 268 | 12:58.08 | 17 | 522 | 1305 | 15 |
| Alise Fakhrutdinova | Women's | Final | 19–16 | Did not advance | | | | | | | | | | | | | |

== Rowing ==
Uzbekistani rowers qualified two boats for the following events through the 2024 Asia & Oceania Qualification Regatta in Chungju, South Korea.

| Athlete | Event | Heats | | Repechage | | Quarterfinals | | Semifinals | | Final | |
| Athlete | Event | Time | Rank | Time | Rank | Time | Rank | Time | Rank | Time | Rank |
|---|---|---|---|---|---|---|---|---|---|---|---|
| Shakhzod Nurmatov; Sobirjon Safaroliyev | Men's lightweight double sculls | 6:56.57 | 5 R | 6:50.61 | 4 FC | Did not advance | | | | 6:31.33 | 15 |
| Hanna Prakatsen | Women's single sculls | 7:37.80 | 2 QF | Bye | | 7:35.91 | 2 SA/B | 7:29.28 | 4 FB | 7:33.57 | 11 |

Qualification Legend: FA=Final A (medal); FB=Final B (non-medal); FC=Final C (non-medal); FD=Final D (non-medal); FE=Final E (non-medal); FF=Final F (non-medal); SA/B=Semifinals A/B; SC/D=Semifinals C/D; SE/F=Semifinals E/F; QF=Quarterfinals; R=Repechage

== Taekwondo ==
Uzbekistan qualified five athletes to compete at the games. Tokyo 2020 gold medalists Ulugbek Rashitov and Svetlana Osipova qualified for Paris 2024 by virtue of finishing within the top five in the Olympic rankings in their respective divisions. Later on, Ozoda Sobirjonova and Jasurbek Jaysunov qualified for the games by winning the semifinal rounds in their respective division, at the 2024 Asian Qualification Tournament in Tai'an, China. Nikita Rafalovich joined the squad through the re-allocations of Individual Neutral Athletes quota.

| Athlete | Event | Round of 16 | Quarterfinals | Semifinals | Repechage | Final / BM | |
| Athlete | Event | Opposition Result | Opposition Result | Opposition Result | Opposition Result | Opposition Result | Rank |
|---|---|---|---|---|---|---|---|
| Ulugbek Rashitov | Men's −68 kg | Lo WF (HKG); W (12–0, 9–2) | Liang Y (CHN); W (2–1, 9–2) | Pérez (ESP); W (7–3, 3–3) | Bye | Kareem (JOR); W (6–4, 5–1) | 1st place, gold medalist(s) |
| Jasurbek Jaysunov | Men's −80 kg | Barkhordari (IRI); L (0–0, 12–0, 6–6) | Did not advance | | Alessio (ITA); L (4–5, 2–5) | Did not advance | 5 |
| Nikita Rafalovich | Men's +80 kg | Salimi (IRI); L (2–8, 1–5) | Did not advance | | | | |
| Ozoda Sobirjonova | Women's −67 kg | Perišić (SRB); L (5–0, 4–8, 0–3) | Did not advance | | Tongchan (THA); W(2–7, 8–1, 11–0) | Chaâri (BEL); L (16–2, 2–3, 4–6) | 5 |
| Svetlana Osipova | Women's +67 kg | Bathily (CIV); W (4–0, 2–7, 0–0) | McGowan (GBR); W (14–6, 14–2) | Lee D-b (KOR); W (3–3, 9–5) | Bye | Laurin (FRA); L (0–3, 3–3) | 2nd place, silver medalist(s) |

== Weightlifting ==
Uzbekistan entered three weightlifters into the Olympic competition. Akbar Djuraev (men's 102 kg) and Rigina Adashbaeva (women's 81 kg) secured one of the top ten slots in their respective weight divisions based on the IWF Olympic Qualification Rankings; meanwhile, Tursunoy Jabborova (women's +81 kg) qualified for the games via the re-allocations of unused host or universality spots.

| Athlete | Event | Snatch | | Clean & Jerk | | Total | Rank |
| Athlete | Event | Result | Rank | Result | Rank | Total | Rank |
|---|---|---|---|---|---|---|---|
| Akbar Djuraev | Men's −102 kg | 189 | 2 | 219 | 2 | 404 | 2nd place, silver medalist(s) |
| Rigina Adashbaeva | Women's −81 kg | 105 | 8 | 131 | 8 | 236 | 8 |
| Tursunoy Jabborova | Women's +81 kg | 118 | 8 | 133 | 12 | 251 | 10 |

== Wrestling ==
Uzbekistan qualified seven wrestlers for each of the following classes into the Olympic competition. Three of them qualified for the games by virtue of top five results through the 2023 World Championships in Belgrade, Serbia; meanwhile, the other wrestlers qualified for the games after winning the semifinal match, at the 2024 Asian Olympic Qualification Tournament in Bishkek, Kyrgyzstan.

Key:

- VT (ranking points: 5–0 or 0–5) – Victory by fall.
- VB (ranking points: 5–0 or 0–5) – Victory by injury (VF for forfeit, VA for withdrawal or disqualification)
- PP (ranking points: 3–1 or 1–3) – Decision by points – the loser with technical points.
- PO (ranking points: 3–0 or 0–3) – Decision by points – the loser without technical points.
- ST (ranking points: 4–0 or 0–4) – Great superiority – the loser without technical points and a margin of victory of at least 8 (Greco-Roman) or 10 (freestyle) points.
- SP (ranking points: 4–1 or 1–4) – Technical superiority – the loser with technical points and a margin of victory of at least 8 (Greco-Roman) or 10 (freestyle) points.

Freestyle

| Athlete | Event | Qualification | Round of 16 | Quarterfinal | Semifinal | Repechage | Final / BM | |
| Athlete | Event | Opposition Result | Opposition Result | Opposition Result | Opposition Result | Opposition Result | Opposition Result | Rank |
|---|---|---|---|---|---|---|---|---|
| Gulomjon Abdullaev | Men's −57 kg | —N/a | Rzazade (AZE); W 11–4 ^{PP} | Harutyunyan (ARM); W 12–5 ^{PP} | Lee (USA); L 4–14 ^{SP} | Did not advance | Almaz Uulu (KGZ); W 5–1 ^{PP} | 3rd place, bronze medalist(s) |
| Razambek Zhamalov | Men's −74 kg | Kadzimahamedau (AIN); W 8–0 ^{PO} | Salkazanov (SVK); W 11–3 ^{PP} | Valiev (ALB); W 6–5 ^{PP} | Rassadin (TJK); W 8–2 ^{PP} | Bye | Takatani (JPN); W 4–0 | 1st place, gold medalist(s) |
| Javrail Shapiev | Men's −86 kg | —N/a | Gamkrelidze (GEO); W 5–1 ^{PP} | Ramazanov (BUL); L 1–4 ^{PP} | Did not advance | Moore (CAN); W 6–1 ^{PP} | Brooks (USA); L 0–5 ^{PP} | 5 |
| Aktenge Keunimjaeva | Women's −50 kg | —N/a | Livach (UKR); L 0–10 ^{SP} | Did not advance | | | | 13 |

Greco-Roman

| Athlete | Event | Round of 16 | Quarterfinals | Semifinals | Repechage | Final / BM | |
| Athlete | Event | Opposition Result | Opposition Result | Opposition Result | Opposition Result | Opposition Result | Rank |
|---|---|---|---|---|---|---|---|
| Islomjon Bakhromov | Men's −60 kg | Valizadeh (EOR); W 9–0 ^{SP} | Ri S-u (PRK); L 0–9 ^{SP} | Did not advance | | | 7 |
| Aram Vardanyan | Men's −77 kg | Abdelrahman (EGY); W 8–0 ^{SP} | Kusaka (JPN); L 2–12 ^{SP} | Did not advance | Ouakali (ALG); W 11–0 ^{SP} | Amoyan (ARM); L 5–6 ^{PP} | 5 |
| Rustam Assakalov | Men's −97 kg | Mejía (HON); W 5–3 ^{PP} | Aleksanyan (ARM); L 5–9 ^{PP} | Did not advance | Kim S-j (KOR); W 8–2 ^{PP} | Rosillo (CUB); L 0–2 ^{PO} | 5 |

== See also ==
- Uzbekistan at the 2024 Winter Youth Olympics
- Uzbekistan at the 2024 Summer Paralympics
