= Mohamed Tarek =

Egyptian footballer (born 1989)

Personal information
- Date of birth: October 19, 1989 (age 37)
- Place of birth: Egypt
- Position: Right back

Team information
- Current team: El Raja (on loan from Alassiouty Sport)
- Number: 21

Senior career*
Years	Team	Apps	(Gls)
2012–2013	Zamalek B		
2013–2014	Tersana		
2014–2015	El Sharkia		
2015–2017	Petrojet	12	(0)
2016–2017	→ El-Entag El-Harby (loan)	9	(0)
2017–	Alassiouty Sport	12	(1)
2018–	→ El Raja (loan)		
- * Club domestic league appearances and goals as of 1 October 2017

Mohamed Tarek (Arabic: محمد طارق; born 19 October 1989) is an Egyptian professional footballer who plays as a right back. In 2017, Tarek signed a 2-year contract for Al-Assiouty in a free agent transfer from Petrojet.
