= Óscar Ureña =

Dominican Republic footballer

Personal information
- Full name: Óscar Rene Ureña García
- Date of birth: 31 May 2003 (age 23)
- Place of birth: Figueres, Spain
- Height: 1.71 m (5 ft 7 in)
- Position: Winger

Team information
- Current team: Zaragoza
- Number: 23

Youth career
- 2009–2014: La Salle
- 2014–2016: Figueres
- 2016–2021: Girona

Senior career*
| Years | Team | Apps | (Gls) |
| 2021–2023 | Girona B | 14 | (1) |
| 2021–2024 | Girona | 13 | (0) |
| 2023 | → Cartagena (loan) | 10 | (0) |
| 2023–2024 | → Leganés (loan) | 17 | (0) |
| 2024–2026 | Barcelona B | 31 | (10) |
| 2026– | Zaragoza | 9 | (3) |

International career^{‡}
| 2024 | Dominican Republic U23 | 5 | (0) |
| 2025– | Dominican Republic | 3 | (0) |
- * Club domestic league appearances and goals as of 4 November 2026 ‡ National team caps and goals as of 5 October 2026

Óscar Rene Ureña García (born 31 May 2003) is a professional footballer who plays as a winger for Real Zaragoza. Born in Spain, he plays for the Dominican Republic national team.

== Club career ==
Born in Figueres, Girona, Catalonia to Dominican parents, Ureña joined Girona FC's youth setup from hometown side UE Figueres. On 14 August 2021, before even having appeared with the reserves, he made his first team debut by starting in a 2–0 Segunda División home win against SD Amorebieta.

On 8 February 2022, Ureña renewed his contract with the club until 2025. On 16 January of the following year, he joined second division side FC Cartagena on loan until the end of the season.

On 14 August 2023, Ureña moved to fellow division two side CD Leganés on loan for the entire 2023–24 campaign. Roughly one year later, he signed a two-year contract with FC Barcelona Atlètic.

On 27 August 2026, Ureña joined Real Zaragoza in the Primera Federación on a two-year deal.

== International career ==
In March 2024, Ureña was called up to the Dominican Republic national under-23 team. He was called up to the senior Dominican Republic national team for a set of friendlies in October 2025.

== Honours ==
Leganés

- Segunda División: 2023–24
