= Omar de la Cruz (footballer) =

Dominican footballer (born 2001)

Personal information
- Full name: José Omar de la Cruz Mangas
- Date of birth: 26 August 2001 (age 25)
- Place of birth: Ibiza, Spain
- Height: 1.68 m (5 ft 6 in)
- Position: Midfielder

Team information
- Current team: Cibao
- Number: 20

Senior career*
Years	Team	Apps	(Gls)
2020–2021	Calahorra B	14	(0)
2021–2022	Calahorra	4	(0)
2022–2023	Ibiza IP	37	(0)
2023–2024	Peña Deportiva	11	(0)
2024	Patriotas	5	(0)
2025–	Cibao	36	(2)

International career^{‡}
2020	Dominican Republic under-23	3	(0)
2024	Dominican Republic Olympic	1	(0)
2024–	Dominican Republic	6	(0)
- * Club domestic league appearances and goals as of 9 September 2026 ‡ National team caps and goals as of 28 November 2025

José Omar de la Cruz Mangas (born 26 August 2001) is a footballer who plays as a midfielder for Liga Dominicana de Fútbol club Cibao. Born in Spain, he represents the Dominican Republic internationally.

He began his career in the lower divisions of Spanish football, before joining Patriotas Boyacá of the Colombian Categoría Primera A in July 2024 and Cibao five months later. He played his first senior game for the Dominican Republic in June 2024 and represented the Olympic team at the 2024 games in France.

== Club career ==
De la Cruz was born in Ibiza in the Balearic Islands, to a father from the Dominican Republic and a local mother. He began playing futsal for CE Insular and then for Penya Blanc i Blava. Aged 14, he moved to live with a relative in Rubí in the Province of Barcelona in order to trial for UE Rubí, going on to further develop his game at Cerdanyola del Vallès FC and CF Damm before joining RCD Mallorca in his native islands.

De la Cruz played for the reserve teams of Mallorca and CD Calahorra, the latter in the Tercera División, while also playing for the first team of the latter in Segunda División B in 2020–21. In January 2022, he went back to his birthplace by signing for CD Ibiza Islas Pitiusas of the Segunda Federación. Eighteen months later, he left the relegated club and remained in the fourth tier at SCR Peña Deportiva.

In July 2024, De la Cruz left Spanish football for the first time, signing with Patriotas Boyacá in the Colombian Categoría Primera A.

On 23 January 2025, De la Cruz signed for Cibao FC in the Liga Dominicana de Fútbol.

== International career ==
In November 2020, 19-year-old De la Cruz was called up for the Dominican Republic national football team for friendlies against Caribbean neighbours. However, the games were cancelled as many players were coming from Spain, where COVID-19 cases were increasing.

De la Cruz played three games for the Dominican Republic national under-23 football team in March 2021, in qualification for the Olympic tournament in Japan. They lost to Mexico, the United States and Costa Rica. Weeks earlier, he was an unused substitute for the senior team in a friendly with Serbia.

In May 2024, De la Cruz was called up to the senior national team, ahead of games against Jamaica and the British Virgin Islands at the start of 2026 FIFA World Cup qualification. He made his debut on 6 June in a 1–0 away loss to Jamaica, in the second minute of added time.

De la Cruz was called up for the 2024 Olympic football in France. He became the first Ibizan to take part in the event's history.
