= Fabian Messina =

Dominican Republic footballer (b. 2002)

Personal information
- Full name: Fabian Messina Liriano
- Date of birth: 16 September 2002 (age 24)
- Place of birth: Stuttgart, Germany
- Height: 1.71 m (5 ft 7 in)
- Position: Midfielder

Team information
- Current team: Arenas
- Number: 14

Youth career
- MTV Stuttgart
- SV Hegnach
- FSV Waiblingen
- 2015–2021: Hoffenheim

Senior career*
Years	Team	Apps	(Gls)
2021–2022	Sonnenhof Großaspach	30	(0)
2022–2024	FSV Frankfurt	33	(0)
2025–2026	Arenas	13	(1)
2026-	TSV Schott Mainz	10	(0)

International career^{‡}
2021–	Dominican Republic U23	5	(0)
2024	Dominican Republic Olympic	1	(0)
2022-	Dominican Republic	7	(0)
- * Club domestic league appearances and goals as of 13 October 2026 ‡ National team caps and goals as of 9 September 2025

Fabian Messina Liriano (born 16 September 2002) is a professional footballer who plays as a midfielder for Spanish Primera Federación club Arenas. Born in Germany, he plays for the Dominican Republic national team.

== Club career ==
Messina is a youth product of Hoffenheim. He transferred to Sonnenhof Großaspach in the Regionalliga on 13 July 2021, where he began his senior career.

== International career ==
Born in Germany, Messina is of Italian and Dominican descent. He is a youth international for the Dominican Republic U23s, having represented them 3 times for the 2020 CONCACAF Men's Olympic Qualifying Championship. He debuted with the senior Dominican Republic national team in a 2–0 2022–23 CONCACAF Nations League B win over Belize on 2 June 2022.
