= Francisco Marizán =

Dominican Republic footballer (b. 2006)

Personal information
- Full name: Francisco Miguel Reyes Marizán
- Date of birth: 28 March 2006 (age 20)
- Place of birth: Santiago, Dominican Republic
- Height: 1.78 m (5 ft 10 in)
- Position: Right-back

Team information
- Current team: Volendam
- Number: 35

Youth career
- Zeeburgia
- 2021–: Volendam

Senior career*
Years	Team	Apps	(Gls)
2022–	Jong Volendam	22	(0)
2023–	Volendam	1	(0)

International career^{‡}
2022–2023	Dominican Republic U17	4	(0)
2022–2023	Dominican Republic U23	4	(0)
2024–	Dominican Republic Olympic	1	(0)
- * Club domestic league appearances and goals as of 6 April 2026 ‡ National team caps and goals as of 24 July 2024

Francisco Miguel Reyes Marizán (born 28 March 2006) is a Dominican professional footballer who plays as a right-back for Eredivisie club Volendam and the Dominican Republic national team.

== Club career ==
In July 2021, Marizán left Amsterdam-based AVV Zeeburgia for FC Volendam. He made his senior debut for Volendam's reserve team on 10 December 2022 in a 1–0 home loss to VV Katwijk in the third-tier Tweede Klasse. On 3 September 2023 he made his first-team debut in the Eredivisie as an 70th-minute substitute for Deron Payne in a 2–0 loss to visitors FC Twente. He gave away a penalty kick, but it was revoked after video assistant referee review.

== International career ==
Marizán is a dual national of the Dominican Republic and the Netherlands. In August 2022, he was called up by the Dominican Republic national under-17 football team for qualifiers for the 2023 CONCACAF U-17 Championship. He was chosen in the under-23 team for the football event at the 2024 Summer Olympics, aged 18.
