= José de León (footballer) =

Dominican Republic footballer (born 2004)

Personal information
- Full name: José Alejandro de León Gómez
- Date of birth: 2 March 2004 (age 22)
- Place of birth: Madrid, Spain
- Height: 1.85 m (6 ft 1 in)
- Position: Winger

Team information
- Current team: Ponferradina

Youth career
- 2019–2021: Alavés

Senior career*
Years	Team	Apps	(Gls)
2021–2025	Alavés B	82	(9)
2024–2026	Alavés	0	(0)
2025–2026	→ Barakaldo (loan)	27	(2)
2026–	Ponferradina	0	(0)

International career^{‡}
2024–	Dominican Republic U23	3	(0)
- * Club domestic league appearances and goals as of 9 June 2026 ‡ National team caps and goals as of 9 February 2025

José Alejandro de León Gómez (born 2 March 2004) is a professional footballer who plays as a winger for Spanish club SD Ponferradina. Born in Spain, he represents the Dominican Republic internationally.

== Career ==
De León joined the youth academy of Deportivo Alavés in 2019. In 2021, he started playing with Alavés B. On 19 May 2022, de León signed a professional contract with Alavés until 2025. He made his senior and professional debut with the senior Alavés side in a 2–0 Copa del Rey loss to Athletic Bilbao on 16 January 2024.

On 16 July 2025, de León was loaned to Primera Federación side Barakaldo CF, for one year. On 8 July of the following year, he moved to SD Ponferradina also in that category.

== International career ==
Born in Spain, de León is of Dominican descent. He was called up to the Spain U16s in February 2020. He was called up to the Spain U18s for a set of friendlies in February 2022. In September 2022, he was called up to the Dominican Republic U20s, but had to pull out due to an ankle sprain during training. In March 2024, he was called up to the Dominican Republic national under-23 team.
