= Nowend Lorenzo =

Dominican Republic footballer (b. 2002)

Personal information
- Full name: Nowend Yenrique Lorenzo Cabrera
- Date of birth: 2 November 2002 (age 24)
- Place of birth: Santo Domingo, Dominican Republic
- Height: 1.81 m (5 ft 11 in)
- Position: Winger

Team information
- Current team: Eastern
- Number: 19

Youth career
- 2013–2021: Osasuna

Senior career*
| Years | Team | Apps | (Gls) |
| 2021–2022 | Subiza | 24 | (3) |
| 2022–2023 | Izarra | 33 | (3) |
| 2023–2025 | Osasuna B | 20 | (0) |
| 2025–2026 | CD Tudelano | 23 | (1) |
| 2026– | Eastern | 8 | (0) |

International career^{‡}
| 2021–2024 | Dominican Republic U23 | 10 | (0) |
| 2024 | Dominican Republic Olympic | 3 | (0) |
| 2021–2023 | Dominican Republic | 18 | (4) |
- * Club domestic league appearances and goals as of 22 November 2026 ‡ National team caps and goals as of 31 July 2024

Nowend Yenrique Lorenzo Cabrera (born 2 November 2002) is a Dominican professional footballer who currently plays as a winger for Hong Kong Premier League club Eastern and the Dominican Republic national team.

== Club career ==
On 24 July 2026, Lorenzo joined Hong Kong Premier League club Eastern.

== International career ==
On 7 January 2021, Lorenzo was called up by the Dominican Republic national team manager Jacques Passy for a friendly against Puerto Rico. He made his full international debut twelve days later, starting in the 0–1 loss at the Estadio Olímpico Félix Sánchez in his hometown.

== Career statistics ==
=== International ===
Appearances and goals by national team and year
| National team | Year | Apps | Goals |
|---|---|---|---|
| Dominican Republic | 2021 | 5 | 2 |
| Dominican Republic | 2022 | 4 | 1 |
| Dominican Republic | 2023 | 9 | 1 |
| Total | | 18 | 4 |

Scores and results list the Dominican Republic's goal tally first, score column indicates score after each Lorenzo goal.

List of international goals scored by Nowend Lorenzo
| No. | Date | Venue | Opponent | Score | Result | Competition |
|---|---|---|---|---|---|---|
| 1 | 27 March 2021 | Inter Miami CF Stadium, Fort Lauderdale, United States | Anguilla | 2–0 | 6–0 | 2022 FIFA World Cup qualification |
| 2 | 27 March 2021 | Inter Miami CF Stadium, Fort Lauderdale, United States | Anguilla | 4–0 | 6–0 | 2022 FIFA World Cup qualification |
| 3 | 10 June 2022 | Félix Sánchez Olympic Stadium, Santo Domingo, Dominican Republic | Guatemala | 1–0 | 1–1 | 2022–23 CONCACAF Nations League B |
| 4 | 27 March 2023 | Estadio Panamericano, San Cristóbal, Dominican Republic | Belize | 2–0 | 2–0 | 2022–23 CONCACAF Nations League B |
