= Ziad Kamal =

Egyptian footballer (born 2001)

Personal information
- Full name: Ziad Mohamed Kamal Mohamed M Zeyada
- Date of birth: 5 July 2001 (age 25)
- Height: 1.95 m (6 ft 5 in)
- Position: Midfielder

Team information
- Current team: ENPPI
- Number: 6

Senior career*
Years	Team	Apps	(Gls)
2020–	ENPPI	83	(4)
2024–2025	Zamalek	11	(0)
- * Club domestic league appearances and goals

Ziad Mohamed Kamal Mohamed M Zeyada (Arabic: زياد محمد كمال محمد زيادة; born 7 May 2001) is an Egyptian professional footballer who plays as a midfielder for Egyptian Premier League club ENPPI. He signed for Zamalek coming from ENPPI SC .

== Honours ==
zamalek

- CAF Confederation Cup: 2023–24
- CAF Super Cup: 2024
