= Joao Urbáez =

Dominican Republic footballer (b. 2002)

Personal information
- Full name: Joao Andrés Urbáez Gómez
- Date of birth: 24 July 2002 (age 24)
- Place of birth: Móstoles, Spain
- Height: 1.79 m (5 ft 10 in)
- Position: Centre-back

Team information
- Current team: Cibao FC
- Number: 12

Youth career
- 2010–2018: Leganés
- 2010–2018: Móstoles
- 2018–2020: Rayo Vallecano
- 2020–2021: Alcorcón

Senior career*
Years	Team	Apps	(Gls)
2021–2023	Alcorcón B	49	(0)
2023–2025	Leganés B	52	(0)
2024–2025	Leganés	0	(0)
2025–2026	Flamurtari	17	(1)
2026-	Cibao	0	(0)

International career^{‡}
2021–	Dominican Republic U23	9	(0)
2024	Dominican Republic Olympic	1	(0)
2022–	Dominican Republic	19	(1)
- * Club domestic league appearances and goals as of 9 September 2026 ‡ National team caps and goals as of 28 March 2026

Joao Andrés Urbáez Gómez (born 24 July 2002) is a professional footballer who plays as a centre-back or right-back for Albanian club Flamurtari. Born in Spain, he plays for the Dominican Republic national team.

== Club career ==
Urbáez is a youth product of the academies of Canillas, Móstoles and Alcorcón. He was promoted to Alcorcón B in August 2021, after making his debut with them in May 2021.

== International career ==
Born in Spain, Urbáez is of Dominican descent. He is a one-time representative of the Dominican Republic U23s in 2021. He was called up to the Dominican Republic national team for matches in June 2022. He debuted with the Dominican Republic in a 3–2 CONCACAF Nations League loss to French Guiana on 5 June 2022.

== Career statistics ==
=== International ===
As of match played 26 March 2026

Appearances and goals by national team and year
National team	Year	Apps	Goals
Dominican Republic	2022	3	0
Dominican Republic	2023	–	
Dominican Republic	2024	4	0
Dominican Republic	2025	10	1
Dominican Republic	2026	2	0
Total		19	1

Scores and results list the Dominican Republic's goal tally first, score column indicates score after each Urbáez goal.

List of international goals scored by Joao Urbáez
No.	Date	Venue	Opponent	Score	Result	Competition
1	18 June 2025	AT&T Stadium, Arlington, United States	Costa Rica	1–1	1–2	2025 CONCACAF
