= Ángel Montes de Oca =

Dominican Republic footballer (b. 2003)

Ángel Montes De Oca
Personal information
- Full name: Ángel Enmanuel Montes de Oca Genao
- Date of birth: 18 February 2003 (age 23)
- Place of birth: Dominican Republic
- Height: 1.80 m (5 ft 11 in)
- Position: Midfielder

Team information
- Current team: O&M FC

Youth career
- Cibao

Senior career*
Years	Team	Apps	(Gls)
2022–2024	Cibao	48	(2)
2025–2026	Lorca Deportiva	0	(0)
2025–2026	→ Caravaca (Loan)	7	(0)
2026–	O&M FC	1	(0)

International career^{‡}
2019	Dominican Republic U17	1	(0)
2022-2023	Dominican Republic U20	7	(4)
2023–	Dominican Republic U23	2	(0)
2024	Dominican Republic Olympic team	2	(1)
2023–	Dominican Republic	5	(0)
- * Club domestic league appearances and goals as of 26 August 2026 ‡ National team caps and goals as of 1 September 2025

Ángel Enmanuel Montes de Oca Genao (born 18 February 2003) is a Dominican Republic footballer who plays as a midfielder for Spanish Tercera Federación club Caravaca on loan from Lorca Deportiva, and the Dominican Republic national team. Montes De Oca is the first Dominican born player to ever score a goal in the Olympics, completing this feat in the 2024 Summer Olympics.

== Honours ==
Cibao FC

Champions:2022, 2023, 2024

Dominican Republic under-20

Runners-up: 2022 CONCACAF U-20 Championship
