= Ahmed Eid (footballer) =

Egyptian footballer (born 2001)

Ahmed Eid أحمد عيد
Personal information
- Full name: Ahmed Eid Mohamed Gadelhaq
- Date of birth: 1 January 2001 (age 25)
- Height: 1.78 m (5 ft 10 in)
- Position: Right-back

Team information
- Current team: Al Ahly SC
- Number: 4

Youth career
- 2011–2015: Al Ahly
- 2015–2020: Zamalek

Senior career*
Years	Team	Apps	(Gls)
2020–2023	Zamalek	16	(0)
2021–2022	→ Ismaily (loan)	3	(0)
2022–2023	→ ENPPI (loan)	16	(0)
2023–2026	Al Masry	31	(0)
2026–	Al Ahly SC	3	(0)

International career
2021–2022	Egypt U20	3	(0)
2023–2024	Egypt U23	4	(0)
2024–	Egypt	4	(0)
Medal record
Representing Egypt
U-23 Africa Cup of Nations
Runner-up	Morocco 2023	U-23 Team
- * Club domestic league appearances and goals

Ahmed Eid Mohamed Gadelhaq (Arabic: أحمد عيد; born 1 January 2001) is an Egyptian professional footballer who plays as a right-back for Egyptian Premier League club Al Ahly SC and the Egypt national team.

== International career ==
On 2 December 2025, Eid was called up to the Egypt squad for the 2025 Africa Cup of Nations.

== Honours ==
=== Zamalek ===
- Egyptian Super Cup: 2019–20
- CAF Super Cup: 2020
