= Mohamed Hamdy (footballer, born 2003) =

Egyptian footballer (born 2003)

Mohamad Hamdy
Personal information
- Full name: Mohamed Hamdy Ibrahim Mohamed Abdelsalam
- Date of birth: 26 February 2003 (age 23)
- Place of birth: Egypt
- Height: 1.68 m (5 ft 6 in)
- Position: Defender

Team information
- Current team: ENPPI
- Number: 47

Youth career
- 20??–2022: ENPPI

Senior career*
Years	Team	Apps	(Gls)
2022–	ENPPI	54	(2)
2024–	→ Zamalek (loan)		

International career^{‡}
2023–	Egypt U20	3	(0)
2024–	Egypt U23	1	(0)
- * Club domestic league appearances and goals as of 28 March 2024 ‡ National team caps and goals as of 20:57, 26 May 2023 (UTC)

Mohamed Hamdy Ibrahim Mohamed Abdelsalam (born 26 February 2003) is an Egyptian professional footballer who plays as a defender for Egyptian Premier League club ENPPI.

== Club career ==
Hamdy started his career in ENPPI, where he made his debut on 4 July 2022 in the Egypt Cup match won 3–1 against Nogoom. He scored his first goal on 25 November 2023, opening the scoring in the Premier League match won 2–1 against El Gouna.

== International career ==
In 2024, Hamdy was called up to the Egyptian U-23 squad for the Olympic Games to replace Ahmed Nabil Koka.

== Honours ==
Zamalek

- CAF Super Cup: 2024
