= Nelson Lemaire =

Dominican Republic footballer (born 2001)

Personal information
- Full name: Nelson Christophe Lemaire Vargas
- Date of birth: 19 October 2001 (age 25)
- Place of birth: Schaarbeek, Belgium
- Height: 1.70 m (5 ft 7 in)
- Position: Left-back

Team information
- Current team: RSD Jette
- Number: 17

Youth career
- 2006–2013: Crossing Schaerbeek
- 2013–2015: RWS Bruxelles
- 2015–2024: Union Saint-Gilloise

Senior career*
Years	Team	Apps	(Gls)
2022–2024	Union SG	0	(0)
2022–2024	Union SG II	44	(2)
2024–2025	Tubize-Braine	2	(0)
2025–	RSD Jette	0	(0)

International career
2023	Dominican Republic U23	1	(0)
2024	Dominican Republic Olympic	3	(0)
- * Club domestic league appearances and goals as of 21 January 2026

Nelson Christophe Lemaire Vargas (born 19 October 2001) is a professional footballer who plays as a left-back for Belgian Division 2 club RSD Jette. Born in Belgium, he represents the Dominican Republic at youth level.

== Club career ==
Lemaire grew up in the youth sector of Union Saint-Gilloise, who picked him up in 2015 from White Star Brussels. In 2022, he was promoted to the Under-23 team playing in the fourth division.

== International career ==
In 2024, he was called up by the Dominican Republic Olympic national team to participate in the Games of the XXXIII Olympiad.

== Personal life ==
Lemaire was born in Belgium to a Mauritian father and a Dominican mother, and holds Belgian and Dominican nationality.

== Career statistics ==
=== Club ===
As of match played 21 September 2024

Appearances and goals by club, season and competition
Club	Season	League			Belgian Cup		Other		Total	
Club	Season	Division	Apps	Goals	Apps	Goals	Apps	Goals	Apps	Goals
Union Saint-Gilloise II	2022–23	Belgian Division 3	8	0	—		—		8	0
Union Saint-Gilloise II	2023–24	Belgian Division 3	17	0	—		—		17	0
Tubize-Braine	2024–25	Belgian Division 1	2	0	0	0	—		1	0
Career total			16	5	0	0	0	0	16	5
