= Edgar Pujol =

Dominican Republic footballer (b. 2004)

Personal information
- Full name: Edgar Climent Pujol Portorreal
- Date of birth: 7 August 2004 (age 22)
- Place of birth: Sabadell, Spain
- Height: 1.77 m (5 ft 10 in)
- Position: Defender

Team information
- Current team: Racing Ferrol
- Number: 3

Youth career
- 2010–2013: UE Castellar
- 2013–2015: Sabadell
- 2015–2016: CFU Can Rull
- 2016–2017: Damm
- 2017–2019: Espanyol
- 2019–2022: Real Madrid

Senior career*
Years	Team	Apps	(Gls)
2021–2025	Real Madrid B	71	(1)
2025–	Racing Ferrol	31	(1)

International career^{‡}
2018–2019	Spain U15	6	(0)
2019-2020	Spain U16	5	(0)
2021–2022	Spain U18	8	(0)
2022–2023	Spain U19	11	(0)
2024–	Dominican Republic U23	3	(0)
2025–	Dominican Republic	12	(0)
- * Club domestic league appearances and goals as of 4 November 2026 ‡ National team caps and goals as of 5 October 2026

Edgar Climent Pujol Portorreal (born 7 August 2004) is a footballer who plays as a defender for Primera Federación club Racing Ferrol. Born in Spain, he plays for the Dominican Republic national team.

== Early life ==
Pujol is a native of Sabadell, Spain.

== Club career ==
As a youth player, Pujol joined the youth academy of Spanish La Liga side Real Madrid, where he was regarded as one of the academy's most important players.

== International career ==
In March 2024, Pujol was called up to the Dominican Republic national under-23 team.

== Style of play ==
Pujol mainly operates as a defender and has been described as "with a great ball strike and a good transition from the back... one of the so-called modern centre-backs".

== Personal life ==
Pujol was born in Spain to a family of Dominican descent.

== Career statistics ==
As of match played 15 December 2025

Appearances and goals by club, season and competition
Club	Season	League			National cup		Other		Total	
Club	Season	Division	Apps	Goals	Apps	Goals	Apps	Goals	Apps	Goals
Real Madrid Castilla	2021–22	Primera División RFEF	2	0	0	0	—		2	0
Real Madrid Castilla	2022–23	Primera Federación	20	1	0	0	0	0	20	1
Real Madrid Castilla	2023–24	Primera Federación	26	0			—		26	0
Real Madrid Castilla	2024–25	Primera Federación	23	0	0	0	0	0	23	0
Real Madrid Castilla	Club Total		71	1	0	0	0	0	71	1
Racing de Ferrol	2025-26	Primera Federación	28	1	1	0	0	0	29	1
Racing de Ferrol	2026-27	Primera Federación	3	0	0	0	0	0	3	0
Racing de Ferrol	Club Total		31	1	0	0	0	0	32	1
Total			102	2	1	0	0	0	103	2

== Honours ==
Real Madrid

- UEFA Champions League: 2023–24
