= Bekhruz Askarov =

Uzbek footballer

Bekhruz Asqarov
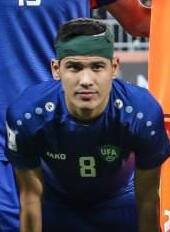

Personal information
- Date of birth: 8 March 2003 (age 23)
- Place of birth: Tashkent, Uzbekistan
- Height: 1.78 m (5 ft 10 in)
- Position: Midfielder

Team information
- Current team: Kattaqorgon (on loan from Pakhtakor)

Youth career
- –2022: Pakhtakor

Senior career*
Years	Team	Apps	(Gls)
2022–2026	Pakhtakor	29	(1)
2025	→ Turan (loan)	10	(1)
2026–	→ Kattaqoʻrgʻon (loan)	0	(0)
2026–	AGMK	0	(0)

International career
2022	Uzbekistan U19	6	(0)
2022–2023	Uzbekistan U20	17	(0)
2023–2025	Uzbekistan U23	4	(0)
- * Club domestic league appearances and goals

Behruz Asqarov (born 8 March 2003, Tashkent, Uzbekistan) is an Uzbek professional footballer who plays as a midfielder for Uzbekistan Pro League club Kattaqoʻrgʻon on loan from Pakhtakor.

== Playing career ==
=== Club career ===
Bekhruz began his professional career in 2022 with Pakhtakor. On 18 October 2022, he made his debut in the 2022 Uzbekistan Super League against Kokand 1912. In February 2024, he moved on loan to Kazakhstan's club Turan.

== Honours ==
Pakhtakor

- Uzbekistan Super League champion (2): 2022, 2023
- Uzbekistan Cup winner: 2025
- Uzbekistan Super Cup winner: 2022

Uzbekistan U20

- AFC U-20 Asian Cup winner: 2023
