= Saidazamat Mirsaidov =

Uzbek footballer

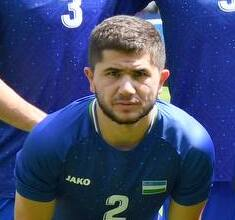

Personal information
- Date of birth: 19 July 2001 (age 25)
- Place of birth: Tashkent, Uzbekistan
- Height: 1.78 m (5 ft 10 in)
- Position: Defender

Team information
- Current team: Navbahor

Youth career
- –2020: Pakhtakor

Senior career*
Years	Team	Apps	(Gls)
2020–2021	Pakhtakor	29	(1)
2021–2024	Olympic	24	(1)
2024–	Navbahor	42	(1)

International career
2018-2020	Uzbekistan U20	3	(0)
2021–2024	Uzbekistan U23	20	(1)
- * Club domestic league appearances and goals

Saidazamat Mirsaidov (born 19 July 2001) is an Uzbek professional footballer who currently plays as a defender for Uzbekistan Super League club Navbahor.

== Career ==
=== Club ===
Saidazamat studied at the academy of Pakhtakor Tashkent. In the 2020 season, trained with the main team. In the 2021 season, he was loaned to the newly formed FC Olympic by Pakhtakor. He initially participated in Uzbekistan Pro League as player of FC Olympic. In the play-off match, Olympic defeated FC Mash'al and won a ticket to the 2022 Uzbekistan Super League. In the 2022 season, spent his first debut season in the Uzbekistan Super League and became the author of 1 goal in 24 matches. He scored his debut goal in the Uzbekistan Super League in an away match against FC AGMK, which his team eventually lost 2-1. Saidazamat, who extended his contract with Olympic for the 2023 season, played in 24 games during the season and scored 1 goal. Before the 2024 season, there was serious interest from Navbahor, a participant in the AFC Asian Champions League, and he was moving to Navbahor.

=== National team ===
Saidazamat was called up to Uzbekistan national U20 team in 2018. He won a silver medal at the 2022 AFC U-23 Asian Cup as part of Uzbekistan U-23 national team. Played in 5 matches for the Uzbekistan Olympic team at the 2022 Asian Games, ultimately winning a bronze medal. On November 13, 2022, he received his first call-up to the Uzbekistan national football team, coached by Srečko Katanec.

== Achievements ==
- Uzbekistan Super League Champion: 2020
- Uzbekistan Cup Winner: 2020
- AFC U-23 Asian Championship 2022: Runner-up
