= Zafarmurod Abdurakhmatov =

Uzbekistani footballer

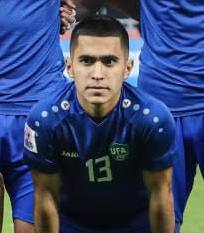

Personal information
- Full name: Zafarmurod Bahrom o'g'li Abdurakhmatov
- Date of birth: 28 April 2003 (age 23)
- Place of birth: Qamashi, Uzbekistan
- Height: 1.70 m (5 ft 7 in)
- Position: Defender

Team information
- Current team: Nasaf
- Number: 8

Youth career
- 2020–2022: Nasaf

Senior career*
Years	Team	Apps	(Gls)
2022–	Nasaf	85	(2)

International career^{‡}
2022	Uzbekistan U19	2	(0)
2023	Uzbekistan U20	14	(2)
2023–	Uzbekistan U23	0	(0)
2024–	Uzbekistan	2	(0)
Medal record
Men's football
Representing Uzbekistan
AFC U-23 Asian Cup
Silver medal – second place	2024 Qatar	Team
- * Club domestic league appearances and goals as of 29 July 2026 ‡ National team caps and goals as of 23 January 2024 (UTC)

Zafarmurod Bahrom o'g'li Abdurakhmatov (born 28 April 2003) is an Uzbekistani footballer who plays for Nasaf and Uzbekistan national football team.

== Career ==
Zafarmurod Abdurakhmatov was born on 28 April 2003 in Qamashi district of Kashkadarya region.

Zafarmurod Abdurakhmatov is a pupil of Nasaf football academy. Until the 2021 season, Zafarmurod Abdurakhmatov worked in the Nasaf U18 team. From 1 January 2021, Nasaf moved to the U21 team.

=== Team ===
Zafarmurod Abdurakhmatov played in several age group teams of Uzbekistan. Uzbekistan U19, Uzbekistan U20 and Uzbekistan U23 from Jumala. Under Timur Kapadze, he will make his debut in Uzbekistan U19 team on September 8, 2022, in a friendly match against Argentina U20 team. He will make his debut in Uzbekistan U20 team under Ravshan Haydarov on February 14, 2023, in a friendly match against Tajikistan U20 team. In the 2023 U-20 Asian Cup held in Uzbekistan, the U20 team of Uzbekistan became the Asian champion.

== Career statistics ==
=== International ===
Abdurakhmatov made his debut for the Uzbekistan main team on 18 January 2024 in a 2023 AFC Asian Cup match against India.

Uzbekistan national team
Year	Apps	Goals
2024	2	0
Total	2	0

Statistics accurate as of match played 23 January.
