= Asadbek Rakhimjonov =

Uzbek footballer

Asadbek Rahimjonov

Personal information
- Full name: Asadbek Rahimjonov
- Date of birth: February 17, 2004 (age 22)
- Place of birth: Namangan, Uzbekistan
- Height: 1.82 m (5 ft 11 1/2 in)
- Position: Midfielder

Team information
- Current team: Bunyodkor

Youth career
- ...-2022: Turon

Senior career*
Years	Team	Apps	(Gls)
2022-2023	Turon	0	(0)
2023	→ Olympic	20	(0)
2024	AGMK	0	(0)
2024	→ Olympic	10	(1)
2024	→ Bunyodkor	11	(0)
2025-	Bunyodkor	0	(0)

International career
2023-	Uzbekistan U-23	20	(0)
- * Club domestic league appearances and goals

Asadbek Rakhimjonov (Uzbek: Asadbek Rahimjonov; born 17 February 2004) is an Uzbekistani footballer who plays as a midfielder for Uzbekistan Super League club Bunyodkor.

== Football career ==
=== Club ===
A pupul of FC Turon youth academy. In 2021-2022, Asadbek played for the U-19 youth team of FC Turon Yaypan. For the 2023 season, the head coach of the Uzbekistan national under-23 football team Timur Kapadze invited Asadbek to join Olympic. Asadbek started the 2023 season on loan to Olympic. He made his debut in the 2023 Uzbekistan Super League during the first round match against Pakhtakor, coming on as a substitute in the 89th minute. Throughout the season, he became one of the key players for Olympic's first squad, appearing in 20 league matches. He also participated in 4 matches in the 2023 Uzbekistan Cup.

At the beginning of the 2024 season, signed a three-year contract with Olmaliq's AGMK. According to the agreement, Asadbek would play for Olympic on loan for one season.

=== International career ===
As a member of the Uzbekistan U23 national team, he participated in the Asian Games held in China in 2022, where the team secured third place by defeating Hong Kong 4-0 in the decisive match. In the 2024 AFC U-23 Asian Cup, Uzbekistan finished as runners-up and earned a qualification spot for the Olympic Games in Paris.

On the eve of the 2024 Summer Olympics in Paris, Timur Kapadze included Rakhimjonov in the extended roster of players competing in the tournament.

== Honors ==
- AFC U-23 Asian Cup runner-up: 2024
