= Rafael Núñez (footballer) =

Dominican footballer

Personal information
- Full name: Rafael Leonardo Núñez Mata
- Date of birth: 25 January 2002 (age 24)
- Place of birth: Bonao, Dominican Republic
- Height: 1.78 m (5 ft 10 in)
- Position: Winger

Team information
- Current team: Elche

Youth career
- Rayo Vallecano
- 2015–2021: Atlético Madrid

Senior career*
Years	Team	Apps	(Gls)
2021	Atlético Madrid B	0	(0)
2021	→ Atlético Ottawa (loan)	25	(0)
2022–2023	Almería B	43	(5)
2023–2024	Elche B	23	(6)
2023–	Elche	14	(1)
2025	→ Cartagena (loan)	14	(1)
2025–2026	→ Eldense (loan)	20	(0)
2026-	→ CD Coria (loan)	0	(0)

International career^{‡}
2021–	Dominican Republic U23	3	(0)
2024	Dominican Republic Olympic	3	(1)
2022–	Dominican Republic	14	(3)
- * Club domestic league appearances and goals as of 2 September 2026 ‡ National team caps and goals as of 21 June 2025

Rafael Leonardo Núñez Mata (born 25 January 2002) is a Dominican professional footballer who plays as a winger for Spanish club Elche.

== Early life ==
Núñez was born in Bonao, Dominican Republic and grew up in Spain.

== Club career ==
=== Atlético Madrid ===
In 2015, Núñez joined the academy program of La Liga side Atlético Madrid. In June 2021, he went on loan with Atléti-owned Canadian Premier League side Atlético Ottawa. He made his professional debut on June 26 against FC Edmonton.

=== Elche ===
==== Loan to Cartagena ====
On 3 February 2025, Núñez moved on loan to Cartagena until the end of the second-tier season.

== International career ==
In March 2021, Núñez represented the Dominican Republic at the 2020 CONCACAF Men's Olympic Qualifying Championship, making three appearances.
