= Dominican Republic national under-23 football team =

National association football team

Dominican Republic Olympic
- Nickname: Los Quisqueyanos
- Confederation: CONCACAF
- Head coach: Ibai Gómez
First colors	Second colors

Summer Olympics
- Appearances: 1 (first in 2024)
- Best result: Group stage (2024)

CONCACAF Men's Olympic Qualifying Championship
- Appearances: 1 (first in 2020)
- Best result: Group stage (2020)

The Dominican Republic national under-23 football team represents the Dominican Republic in tournaments and friendly matches at the under-23 level. They qualified to compete in their first CONCACAF qualifier for the Olympics in 2020, which was postponed due to the coronavirus outbreak in Mexico and around the world. The tournament was later held in March 2021, and the Dominican national U23 team finished last in their group. However, Dominican Republic U20 reached the 2022 CONCACAF U-20 Championship final which qualified the nation to the 2024 Summer Olympics for the first time in their history.

== Summer Olympics record ==
Rules

- 1996–present: under-23 national teams (with three 'no age limit' players allowed, after an agreement between FIFA and OIC)

Note

- No tournament held in 1932

Olympic Games record
Year	Host	Round	Pos.	Pld	W	D	L	GF	GA
1900	(French Third Republic) Paris	Did not qualify							
1904	(United States) St. Louis	Did not qualify							
1908	(United Kingdom of Great Britain and Ireland) London	Did not qualify							
1912	(Sweden) Stockholm	Did not qualify							
1920	(Belgium) Antwerp	Did not qualify							
1924	(France) Paris	Did not qualify							
1928	(Netherlands) Amsterdam	Did not qualify							
1936	(Germany) Berlin	Did not qualify							
1948	(United Kingdom) London	Did not qualify							
1952	(Finland) Helsinki	Did not qualify							
1956	(Australia) Melbourne	Did not qualify							
1960	(Italy) Rome	Did not qualify							
1964	(Japan) Tokyo	Did not qualify							
1968	Mexico City	Did not qualify							
1972	(West Germany) Munich	Did not qualify							
1976	(Canada) Montreal	Did not qualify							
1980	(Soviet Union) Moscow	Did not qualify							
1984	(United States) Los Angeles	Did not qualify							
1988	(South Korea) Seoul	Did not qualify							
1992	(Spain) Barcelona	Did not qualify							
1996	(United States) Atlanta	Did not qualify							
2000	(Australia) Sydney	Did not qualify							
2004	(Greece) Athens	Did not qualify							
2008	(China) Beijing	Did not qualify							
2012	(United Kingdom) London	Did not qualify							
2016	(Brazil) Rio de Janeiro	Did not qualify							
2020	(Japan) Tokyo	Did not qualify							
2024	(France) Paris	Group stage	12th	3	0	2	1	2	4
2028	(United States) Los Angeles	To be determined							
2032	(Australia) Brisbane	To be determined							
Total			1/30	3	0	2	1	2	4

*Denotes draws including knockout matches decided via penalty shoot-out.

== Results and fixtures ==
=== 2024 ===
23 March Friendly	Paraguay	2–0	Dominican Republic	Asunción, Paraguay
19:30	F. Cardozo 8'; Román 70'			Stadium: Estadio Tigo La Huerta; Referee: Juan Jara (Paraguay)

26 March Friendly	Paraguay	1–2	Dominican Republic	Asunción, Paraguay
19:30	Fernández 73'	Report	Lemaire 17'; Ureña 30'	Stadium: Estadio Tigo La Huerta

11 July Friendly	France	7–0	Dominican Republic	Toulon, France
21:15	Millot 10'; Lacazette 28', 45+3'; Olise 51', 56'; Akliouche 80'; Cherki 85'			Stadium: Stade Mayol

24 July Olympics GS	Egypt	0–0	Dominican Republic	Nantes, France
17:00				Stadium: Stade de la Beaujoire

27 July Olympics GS	Dominican Republic	1–3	Spain	Bordeaux, France
15:00	Montes de Oca 38'		Fermín 24'; Baena 55'; Gutiérrez 70'	Stadium: Stade de Bordeaux

30 July Olympics GS	Dominican Republic	1–1	Uzbekistan	Paris, France
15:00	R. Núñez 51'		Odilov 58'	Stadium: Parc des Princes

== Players ==
=== Current squad ===
The following players were called up for the 2024 Olympic Games.

No.	Pos.	Player	Date of birth (age)	Caps	Goals	Club
1	GK	Xavier Valdez	23 November 2003 (age 22)	0	0	(United States Soccer Federation) Houston Dynamo
13	GK	Enrique Bösl	7 February 2004 (age 22)	2	0	(German Football Association) FC Ingolstadt II
2	DF	Francisco Marizán	28 March 2006 (age 20)	2	0	(Royal Dutch Football Association) Volendam U21
4	DF	Edgar Pujol	7 August 2004 (age 22)	1	0	(Royal Spanish Football Federation) Real Madrid Castilla
5	DF	Luiyi de Lucas*	31 August 1994 (age 32)	0	0	(Cyprus Football Association) AEL Limassol
12	DF	Joao Urbáez	24 July 2002 (age 24)	4	0	(Royal Spanish Football Federation) Leganés B
16	DF	Nelson Lemaire	19 October 2001 (age 25)	0	0	(Royal Belgian Football Association) Union SG U23
6	MF	Heinz Mörschel*	24 August 1997 (age 29)	0	0	Unattached
8	MF	Ángel Montes de Oca	18 February 2001 (age 25)	1	0	(Dominican Football Federation) Cibao
14	MF	Omar de la Cruz	26 August 2001 (age 25)	6	0	(Colombian Football Federation) Patriotas
15	MF	Fabian Messina	16 September 2002 (age 24)	5	0	Unattached
3	FW	Josué Báez	23 May 2002 (age 24)	4	0	(Dominican Football Federation) O&M
7	FW	Oscar Ureña	31 May 2003 (age 23)	1	0	(Royal Spanish Football Federation) Girona
9	FW	Rafael Núñez	25 January 2002 (age 24)	4	0	(Royal Spanish Football Federation) Elche Ilicitano
10	FW	Edison Azcona	21 November 2003 (age 22)	4	1	(United States Soccer Federation) Las Vegas Lights
11	FW	Peter González	25 July 2002 (age 24)	0	0	(Royal Spanish Football Federation) Getafe
17	FW	José de León	2 March 2004 (age 22)	1	0	(Royal Spanish Football Federation) Alavés B
18	FW	Nowend Lorenzo	2 November 2002 (age 24)	4	0	(Royal Spanish Football Federation) Osasuna B

* Overage player.

Unenrolled alternate players
No.	Pos.	Player	Date of birth (age)	Caps	Goals	Club
20	GK	Anthony Núñez	14 October 2005 (age 21)	0	0	(The Football Association) Mansfield Town Reserves
22	DF	Thomas Jungbauer	30 July 2005 (age 21)	3	0	(Football Association of the Czech Republic) Dynamo Ceske Budejovice B

=== Latest call ups ===
Pos.	Player	Date of birth (age)	Caps	Goals	Club	Latest call-up
DF	Junior Firpo*	22 August 1996 (age 30)	0	0	(England) Leeds United	2024 Olympic Games^{WD}
DF	Israel Boatwright	2 June 2005 (age 21)	3	0	(United States) Inter Miami	2024 Olympic Games^{PRE}
MF	Isaac Báez	23 May 2002 (age 24)	3	0	(Dominican Republic) O&M	2024 Olympic Games^{PRE}
MF	Yordy Álvarez	3 December 2005 (age 20)	1	9	(Dominican Republic) Atlántico	vs. Paraguay, 26 March 2024
MF	David Rodríguez		0	0	(Paraguay) Cerro Porteño U23	vs. Paraguay, 26 March 2024
FW	Dorny Romero*	24 January 1998 (age 28)	3	0	(Kazakhstan) Aktobe	2024 Olympic Games^{PRE}
FW	Edarlyn Reyes*	30 September 1997 (age 29)	2	0	(Kazakhstan) Elimai	2024 Olympic Games^{PRE}
FW	Mariano Díaz*	1 August 1993 (age 33)	0	0	Unattached	2024 Olympic Games^{PRE}
FW	Derek Cuevas	7 January 2004 (age 22)	0	0	(United States) Carolina Core	2024 Olympic Games^{PRE}
FW	Oliver Schmidhauser	2 June 2004 (age 22)	1	0	Unattached	vs. Paraguay, 26 March 2024
FW	Alessandro Ovalle	19 December 2005 (age 20)	0	0	(Italy) Sampdoria Primavera	vs. Paraguay, 26 March 2024
FW	Yan Friessner	18 March 2006 (age 20)	0	0	(Germany) Rot-Weiss Essen U19	vs. Paraguay, 26 March 2024
^{PRE} Part of the preliminary squad^{INJ} Player injured^{WD} Player withdrew for non-injury related reasons

* Overage player.

=== Overage players in Olympic Games ===
Tournament	Player 1	Player 2	Player 3
2024	Luiyi de Lucas (DF)	Junior Firpo (DF)	Heinz Mörschel (MF)
