= Mexico national football team results (2020–present) =

This article provides details of international football games played by the Mexico national football team from 2020 to present.

== Results ==
Key
Win
Draw
Defeat

=== 2020 ===
26 March 2020 Friendly	Mexico	Cancelled	Czech Republic	Charlotte, United States
				Stadium: Bank of America Stadium

29 March 2020 Friendly	Mexico	Cancelled	Greece	Arlington, United States
				Stadium: AT&T Stadium

30 May 2020 Friendly	Mexico	Cancelled	Colombia	Denver, United States
				Stadium: Empower Field at Mile High

30 September 2020 Friendly	Mexico	3–0	Guatemala	Mexico City, Mexico
21:00 UTC−5	Martín 6'; Pineda 28'; Córdova 36'	Report		Stadium: Estadio Azteca; Attendance: 0 Referee: Fernando Hernández (Mexico)

7 October 2020 Friendly	Netherlands	0–1	Mexico	Amsterdam, Netherlands
20:45 UTC+2		Report	Jiménez 60' (pen.)	Stadium: Johan Cruyff Arena; Attendance: 0 Referee: Srđan Jovanović (Serbia)

13 October 2020 Friendly	Mexico	2–2	Algeria	The Hague, Netherlands
21:00 UTC+2	Corona 43'; D. Lainez 86'	Report	Bennacer 45'; Mahrez 67'	Stadium: Cars Jeans Stadion; Referee: Bas Nijhuis (Netherlands)

14 November 2020 Friendly	Mexico	3–2	South Korea	Wiener Neustadt, Austria
21:00 UTC+1	Jiménez 67'; Antuna 69'; Salcedo 70'	Report	Hwang Ui-jo 20'; Kwon Kyung-won 87'	Stadium: Wiener Neustadt Arena; Attendance: 0 Referee: Harald Lechner (Austria)

17 November 2020 Friendly	Japan	0–2	Mexico	Graz, Austria
21:00 UTC+1		Report	Jiménez 63'; Lozano 68'	Stadium: Liebenauer Stadium; Referee: Manuel Schüttengruber (Austria)

=== 2021 ===
27 March 2021 Friendly	Wales	1–0	Mexico	Cardiff, Wales
20:00 UTC+0	Moore 11'	Report		Stadium: Cardiff City Stadium; Attendance: 0 Referee: Ian McNabb (Northern Ireland)

30 March 2021 Friendly	Costa Rica	0–1	Mexico	Wiener Neustadt, Austria
14:00 UTC−6		Report	Lozano 89'	Stadium: Wiener Neustadt Arena; Attendance: 0 Referee: Christian-Petru Ciochirca (Austria)

29 May 2021 Friendly	Mexico	2–1	Iceland	Arlington, United States
20:00 UTC−5	Lozano 73', 78'	Report	E. Álvarez 14' (o.g.)	Stadium: AT&T Stadium; Attendance: 45,000; Referee: Ted Unkel (United States)

3 June 2021 2021 Nations League SF	Mexico	0–0 (5–4 p)	Costa Rica	Denver, United States
20:30 UTC−5		Report		Stadium: Empower Field at Mile High; Attendance: 34,451; Referee: Bryan López (Guatemala)
	Penalties
	Antuna (penalty missed); Lozano (penalty scored); Pineda (penalty scored); Pulido (penalty scored); Romo (penalty scored); Gallardo (penalty scored)		(penalty scored) Venegas; (penalty missed) Duarte; (penalty scored) Alfaro; (penalty scored) Lassiter; (penalty scored) Calvo; (penalty missed) Cruz

6 June 2021 2021 Nations League F	United States	3–2 (a.e.t.)	Mexico	Denver, United States
19:00 UTC−5 (Note: Though listed with a 19:00 kick-off time, the match actually began at 19:36.)	Reyna 27'; McKennie 82'; Pulisic 114' (pen.)	Report	Corona 2'; Lainez 79'	Stadium: Empower Field at Mile High; Attendance: 37,648; Referee: John Pitti (Panama)

12 June 2021 Friendly	Mexico	0–0	Honduras	Atlanta, United States
20:00 UTC−4		Report		Stadium: Mercedes-Benz Stadium; Attendance: 70,072; Referee: Ted Unkel (United States)

30 June 2021 Friendly	Mexico	3–0	Panama	Nashville, United States
19:00 UTC−5	Lainez 21'; Montes 57'; Martín 90+1'	Report		Stadium: Nissan Stadium; Attendance: 30,386; Referee: Kevin Morrison (Jamaica)

3 July 2021 Friendly	Mexico	4–0	Nigeria	Los Angeles, United States
20:00 UTC−7	Herrera 2', 52'; Funes Mori 4'; Dos Santos 78'	Report		Stadium: Los Angeles Memorial Coliseum; Attendance: 53,258; Referee: Oliver Vergara (Panama)

10 July 2021 2021 Gold Cup GS	Mexico	0–0	Trinidad and Tobago	Arlington, United States
21:00 UTC−5		Report		Stadium: AT&T Stadium; Attendance: 41,229; Referee: Ricardo Montero (Costa Rica)

14 July 2021 2021 Gold Cup GS	Guatemala	0–3	Mexico	Dallas, United States
21:30 UTC−5 (Note: The match, originally scheduled at 21:30 CDT (UTC−5), was delayed until 22:30 CDT due to torrential rain in the area.)		Report	Funes Mori 29', 55'; Pineda 79'	Stadium: Cotton Bowl; Attendance: 15,391; Referee: Daneon Parchment (Jamaica)

18 July 2021 2021 Gold Cup GS	Mexico	1–0	El Salvador	Dallas, United States
21:00 UTC−5	Rodríguez 26'	Report		Stadium: Cotton Bowl; Attendance: 45,792; Referee: Saíd Martínez (Honduras)

24 July 2021 2021 Gold Cup QF	Mexico	3–0	Honduras	Glendale, United States
19:00 UTC−7	Funes Mori 26'; Dos Santos 31'; Pineda 38'	Report		Stadium: State Farm Stadium; Attendance: 64,211; Referee: Mario Escobar (Guatemala)

29 July 2021 2021 Gold Cup SF	Mexico	2–1	Canada	Houston, United States
21:15 UTC−5	Pineda 45+2' (pen.); Herrera 90+8'	Report	Buchanan 57'	Stadium: NRG Stadium; Attendance: 70,304; Referee: Daneon Parchment (Jamaica)

1 August 2021 2021 Gold Cup F	United States	1–0 (a.e.t.)	Mexico	Paradise, United States
19:30 UTC−5	Robinson 118'	Report		Stadium: Allegiant Stadium; Attendance: 61,114; Referee: Saíd Martinez (Honduras)

2 September 2021 2022 World Cup qualification	Mexico	2–1	Jamaica	Mexico City, Mexico
21:00 UTC−5	Vega 50'; Martín 89'	Report	Nicholson 65'	Stadium: Estadio Azteca; Attendance: 0 Referee: Selvin Brown (Honduras)

5 September 2021 2022 World Cup qualification	Costa Rica	0–1	Mexico	San José, Costa Rica
17:00 UTC−6		Report	Pineda 45+1' (pen.)	Stadium: Estadio Nacional; Attendance: 3,000; Referee: Ismail Elfath (United States)

8 September 2021 2022 World Cup qualification	Panama	1–1	Mexico	Panama City, Panama
19:05 UTC−5 (Note: The Panama v Mexico match was originally scheduled on 8 September 2021, 20:05 local time, but was rescheduled to 19:05 local time since Panama maintains a curfew which begins at 00:00 as a preventive measure against the COVID-19 pandemic.)	Blackburn 28'	Report	Corona 76'	Stadium: Estadio Rommel Fernández; Attendance: 16,000; Referee: Mario Escobar (Guatemala)

7 October 2021 2022 World Cup qualification	Mexico	1–1	Canada	Mexico City, Mexico
20:40 UTC−5	J. Sánchez 21'	Report	Osorio 42'	Stadium: Estadio Azteca; Attendance: 0 Referee: Ismael Cornejo (El Salvador)

10 October 2021 2022 World Cup qualification	Mexico	3–0	Honduras	Mexico City, Mexico
18:00 UTC−5 (Note: The Mexico v Honduras match was originally scheduled on 10 October 2021, 17:45 local time, but was rescheduled to 18:00 local time.)	Córdova 18'; Funes Mori 76'; Lozano 86'	Report		Stadium: Estadio Azteca; Attendance: 70,000; Referee: Ismail Elfath (United States)

13 October 2021 2022 World Cup qualification	El Salvador	0–2	Mexico	San Salvador, El Salvador
20:05 UTC−6		Report	Moreno 30'; Jiménez 90+3' (pen.)	Stadium: Estadio Cuscatlán; Attendance: 31,000; Referee: Drew Fischer (Canada)

27 October 2021 Friendly	Mexico	2–3	Ecuador	Charlotte, United States
20:00 UTC−4	Alvarado 6'; Rodríguez 59'	Report	Quiñónez 2'; Corozo 15'; Chalá 75'	Stadium: Bank of America Stadium; Attendance: 39,887; Referee: Ted Unkel (United States)

12 November 2021 2022 World Cup qualification	United States	2–0	Mexico	Cincinnati, United States
21:10 UTC−5	Pulisic 74'; McKennie 85'	Report		Stadium: TQL Stadium; Attendance: 26,000; Referee: Iván Barton (El Salvador)

16 November 2021 2022 World Cup qualification	Canada	2–1	Mexico	Edmonton, Canada
19:05 UTC−7	Larin 45+2', 52'	Report	Herrera 90'	Stadium: Commonwealth Stadium; Attendance: 44,212; Referee: Mario Escobar (Guatemala)

8 December 2021 Friendly	Mexico	2–2	Chile	Austin, United States
20:00 UTC−6	Giménez 9'; Silva 64'	Report	Morales 21'; Parra 86'	Stadium: Q2 Stadium; Attendance: 17,202; Referee: Selvin Brown (Honduras)

=== 2022 ===
27 January 2022 2022 World Cup qualification	Jamaica	1–2	Mexico	Kingston, Jamaica
19:00 UTC−5	Johnson 50'	Report	Martín 81'; Vega 83'	Stadium: Independence Park; Attendance: 0 Referee: Ismael Cornejo (El Salvador)

30 January 2022 2022 World Cup qualification	Mexico	0–0	Costa Rica	Mexico City, Mexico
17:00 UTC−6		Report		Stadium: Estadio Azteca; Attendance: 2,000; Referee: Saíd Martínez (Honduras)

2 February 2022 2022 World Cup qualification	Mexico	1–0	Panama	Mexico City, Mexico
21:00 UTC−6	Jiménez 80' (pen.)	Report		Stadium: Estadio Azteca; Attendance: 2,000; Referee: Iván Barton (El Salvador)

24 March 2022 2022 World Cup qualification	Mexico	0–0	United States	Mexico City, Mexico
20:00 UTC−6		Report		Stadium: Estadio Azteca; Attendance: 47,000; Referee: Mario Escobar (Guatemala)

27 March 2022 2022 World Cup qualification	Honduras	0–1	Mexico	San Pedro Sula, Honduras
17:05 UTC−6		Report	E. Álvarez 70'	Stadium: Estadio Olímpico Metropolitano; Attendance: 0 Referee: Armando Villarreal (United States)

30 March 2022 2022 World Cup qualification	Mexico	2–0	El Salvador	Mexico City, Mexico
19:05 UTC−6	Antuna 17'; Jiménez 43' (pen.)	Report		Stadium: Estadio Azteca; Attendance: 65,200; Referee: Oshane Nation (Jamaica)

27 April 2022 Friendly	Mexico	0–0	Guatemala	Orlando, United States
20:00 UTC−4		Report		Stadium: Camping World Stadium; Attendance: 37,311; Referee: Reon Radix (Grenada)

28 May 2022 Friendly	Mexico	2–1	Nigeria	Arlington, United States
19:08 UTC−5	Giménez 12'; Troost-Ekong 56' (o.g.)	Report	Dessers 54'	Stadium: AT&T Stadium; Attendance: 56,872; Referee: José Torres (Puerto Rico)

2 June 2022 Friendly	Mexico	0–3	Uruguay	Glendale, United States
19:00 UTC−7		Report	Vecino 35'; Cavani 46', 54'	Stadium: State Farm Stadium; Attendance: 57,735; Referee: Juan Gabriel Calderón (Costa Rica)

5 June 2022 Friendly	Mexico	0–0	Ecuador	Chicago, United States
18:30 UTC−5		Report		Stadium: Soldier Field; Attendance: 61,500; Referee: Oliver Vergara (Panama)

11 June 2022 2022–23 Nations League GS	Mexico	3–0	Suriname	Torreón, Mexico
21:00 UTC−5	Reyes 4'; Martín 40' (pen.); É. Sánchez 90+4'	Report		Stadium: Estadio Corona; Referee: Iván Barton (El Salvador)

14 June 2022 2022–23 Nations League GS	Jamaica	1–1	Mexico	Kingston, Jamaica
19:00 UTC−5	Bailey 4'	Report	Romo 45+3'	Stadium: National Stadium; Referee: Bryan López (Guatemala)

31 August 2022 Friendly	Mexico	0–1	Paraguay	Atlanta, United States
21:00 UTC−4		Report	D. González 50'	Stadium: Mercedes-Benz Stadium; Attendance: 51,387; Referee: Nima Saghafi (United States)

24 September 2022 Friendly	Mexico	1–0	Peru	Pasadena, United States
18:00 UTC−3	Lozano 85'	Report		Stadium: Rose Bowl; Attendance: 62,729; Referee: Bryan López (Guatemala)

27 September 2022 Friendly	Mexico	2–3	Colombia	Santa Clara, United States
19:00 UTC−7	Vega 6' (pen.); Arteaga 29'	Report	Sinisterra 49', 52'; Barrios 68'	Stadium: Levi's Stadium; Attendance: 60,000; Referee: Nima Saghafi (United States)

9 November 2022 Friendly	Mexico	4–0	Iraq	Girona, Spain
21:00 UTC+1	Vega 4'; Funes Mori 48'; Gallardo 67'; Antuna 90+2' (pen.)	Report		Stadium: Montilivi; Attendance: 500; Referee: Guillermo Cuadra Fernández (Spain)

16 November 2022 Friendly	Mexico	1–2	Sweden	Girona, Spain
20:30 UTC+1	Vega 60'	Report	Rohdén 54'; Svanberg 84'	Stadium: Montilivi; Attendance: 5,395; Referee: César Soto Grado (Spain)

22 November 2022 2022 World Cup GS	Mexico	0–0	Poland	Doha, Qatar
19:00 UTC+3		Report		Stadium: Stadium 974; Attendance: 39,369; Referee: Chris Beath (Australia)

26 November 2022 2022 World Cup GS	Argentina	2–0	Mexico	Lusail, Qatar
22:00 UTC+3	Messi 64'; Fernández 87'	Report		Stadium: Lusail Iconic Stadium; Attendance: 88,966; Referee: Daniele Orsato (Italy)

30 November 2022 2022 World Cup GS	Saudi Arabia	1–2	Mexico	Lusail, Qatar
22:00 UTC+3	S. Al-Dawsari 90+5'	Report	Martín 47'; Chávez 52'	Stadium: Lusail Iconic Stadium; Attendance: 84,985; Referee: Michael Oliver (England)

=== 2023 ===
23 March 2023 2022–23 Nations League GS	Suriname	0–2	Mexico	Paramaribo, Suriname
21:00 UTC−3		Report	Vásquez 64'; Dankerlui 82' (o.g.)	Stadium: Frank Essed Stadion; Referee: Saíd Martínez (Honduras)

26 March 2023 2022–23 Nations League GS	Mexico	2–2	Jamaica	Mexico City, Mexico
18:00 UTC−6	Pineda 17'; Lozano 45+2' (pen.)	Report	De Cordova-Reid 8'; E. Álvarez 33' (o.g.)	Stadium: Estadio Azteca; Referee: Ismail Elfath (United States)

19 April 2023 Friendly	United States	1–1	Mexico	Glendale, United States
19:22 UTC−7	Ferreira 81'	Report	Antuna 55'	Stadium: State Farm Stadium; Attendance: 55,730; Referee: Bryan López (Guatemala)

7 June 2023 Friendly	Mexico	2–0	Guatemala	Mazatlán, Mexico
19:00 UTC−7	Jiménez 14' (pen.); De la Rosa 80'	Report		Stadium: Estadio de Mazatlán; Attendance: 20,068; Referee: Nelson Salgado (Honduras)

10 June 2023 Friendly	Mexico	2–2	Cameroon	San Diego, United States
19:00 UTC−7	Reyes 45+2'; K. Álvarez 90+4'	Report	Mbeumo 37'; Toko Ekambi 61'	Stadium: Snapdragon Stadium; Attendance: 30,543; Referee: Kimbell Ward (Saint Kitts and Nevis)

15 June 2023 2023 Nations League SF	United States	3–0	Mexico	Paradise, United States
19:00 UTC−7	Pulisic 37', 46'; Pepi 78'	Report		Stadium: Allegiant Stadium; Attendance: 65,000; Referee: Iván Barton (El Salvador)

18 June 2023 2023 Nations League 3rd	Panama	0–1	Mexico	Paradise, United States
15:00 UTC−7		Report	Gallardo 4'	Stadium: Allegiant Stadium; Attendance: 35,000; Referee: Daneon Parchment (Jamaica)

25 June 2023 2023 Gold Cup GS	Mexico	4–0	Honduras	Houston, United States
19:00 UTC−5	Romo 1', 23'; Pineda 52'; Chávez 64'	Report		Stadium: NRG Stadium; Attendance: 66,255; Referee: Mario Escobar (Guatemala)

29 June 2023 2023 Gold Cup GS	Haiti	1–3	Mexico	Glendale, United States
19:00 UTC−7	Jean Jacques 78'	Report	Martín 46'; Adé 56' (o.g.); Giménez 83'	Stadium: State Farm Stadium; Attendance: 34,517; Referee: Walter López (Guatemala)

2 July 2023 2023 Gold Cup GS	Mexico	0–1	Qatar	Santa Clara, United States
18:00 UTC−7		Report	Shehata 27'	Stadium: Levi's Stadium; Attendance: 60,347; Referee: Drew Fischer (Canada)

8 July 2023 2023 Gold Cup QF	Mexico	2–0	Costa Rica	Arlington, United States
20:30 UTC−5	Pineda 52' (pen.); É. Sánchez 87'	Report		Stadium: AT&T Stadium; Attendance: 60,355; Referee: Saíd Martínez (Honduras)

12 July 2023 2023 Gold Cup SF	Jamaica	0–3	Mexico	Paradise, United States
16:30 UTC−7		Report	Martín 2'; Chávez 30'; Alvarado 90+3'	Stadium: Allegiant Stadium; Attendance: 29,886; Referee: Mario Escobar (Guatemala)

16 July 2023 2023 Gold Cup F	Mexico	1–0	Panama	Inglewood, United States
16:30 UTC−7	Giménez 88'	Report		Stadium: SoFi Stadium; Attendance: 72,963; Referee: Saíd Martínez (Honduras)

9 September 2023 Friendly	Mexico	2–2	Australia	Arlington, United States
21:00 UTC−5	Jiménez 69' (pen.); Huerta 83'	Report	Souttar 16'; Boyle 63' (pen.)	Stadium: AT&T Stadium; Attendance: 52,787; Referee: Rubiel Vazquez (United States)

12 September 2023 Friendly	Mexico	3–3	Uzbekistan	Atlanta, United States
19:30 UTC−4	Jiménez 21', 81'; Antuna 88'	Report	Abdikholikov 18'; Turgunboev 45+1'; Shukurov 90+2'	Stadium: Mercedes-Benz Stadium; Attendance: 33,817; Referee: Victor Rivas (United States)

14 October 2023 Friendly	Mexico	2–0	Ghana	Charlotte, United States
21:00 UTC−4	Lozano 57'; Antuna 72'	Report		Stadium: Bank of America Stadium; Attendance: 60,263; Referee: Joe Dickerson (United States)

17 October 2023 Friendly	Mexico	2–2	Germany	Philadelphia, United States
20:00 UTC−4	Antuna 37'; É. Sánchez 47'	Report	Rüdiger 25'; Füllkrug 51'	Stadium: Lincoln Financial Field; Attendance: 62,284; Referee: Rubiel Vazquez (United States)

17 November 2023 2023–24 Nations League QF	Honduras	2–0	Mexico	Tegucigalpa, Honduras
20:00 UTC−6	Lozano 30'; Róchez 72'	Report		Stadium: Estadio Nacional Chelato Uclés; Attendance: 22,444; Referee: Juan Gabriel Calderón (Costa Rica)

21 November 2023 2023–24 Nations League QF	Mexico	2–0 (a.e.t.) (2–2 agg.) (4–2 p)	Honduras	Mexico City, Mexico
20:30 UTC−6	Chávez 43'; E. Álvarez 90+11'	Report		Stadium: Estadio Azteca; Attendance: 70,078; Referee: Iván Barton (El Salvador)
	Penalties
	Giménez (penalty scored); Vásquez (penalty scored); Pineda (penalty scored); Huerta (penalty scored)		(penalty missed) Róchez; (penalty scored) Acosta; (penalty scored) Elis; (penalty missed) Najar

16 December 2023 Friendly	Mexico	2–3	Colombia	Los Angeles, United States
16:00 UTC−8	Govea 40'; G. Martínez 50'	Report	Reyes 55'; R. Martínez 69'; Gómez 90+2'	Stadium: Los Angeles Memorial Coliseum; Attendance: 64,609; Referee: Victor Rivas (United States)

=== 2024 ===
21 March 2024 2024 Nations League SF	Panama	0–3	Mexico	Arlington, United States
21:15 UTC−5		Report	E. Álvarez 40'; Quiñones 43'; Pineda 67'	Stadium: AT&T Stadium; Attendance: 40,926; Referee: Walter López (Guatemala)

24 March 2024 2024 Nations League F	Mexico	0–2	United States	Arlington, United States
20:15 UTC−5		Report	Adams 45'; Reyna 63'	Stadium: AT&T Stadium; Attendance: 59,471; Referee: Drew Fischer (Canada)

31 May 2024 Friendly	Mexico	1–0	Bolivia	Chicago, United States
19:00 UTC−5	E. Álvarez 47'	Report		Stadium: Soldier Field; Attendance: 52,273; Referee: Yusuke Araki (Japan)

5 June 2024 Friendly	Mexico	0–4	Uruguay	Denver, United States
19:00 UTC−6		Report	Núñez 7', 44', 49'; Pellistri 26'	Stadium: Empower Field at Mile High; Attendance: 57,852; Referee: Oshane Nation (Jamaica)

8 June 2024 Friendly	Mexico	2–3	Brazil	College Station, United States
19:30 UTC−5	Quiñones 73'; G. Martínez 90+2'	Report	Pereira 5'; Martinelli 54'; Endrick 90+6'	Stadium: Kyle Field; Attendance: 85,249; Referee: Lukasz Szpala (United States)

22 June 2024 2024 Copa América GS	Mexico	1–0	Jamaica	Houston, United States
20:00 UTC−5	Arteaga 69'	Report		Stadium: NRG Stadium; Attendance: 53,763; Referee: Ismail Elfath (United States)

26 June 2024 2024 Copa América GS	Venezuela	1–0	Mexico	Inglewood, United States
18:00 UTC−7	Rondón 57' (pen.)	Report		Stadium: SoFi Stadium; Attendance: 72,773; Referee: Raphael Claus (Brazil)

30 June 2024 2024 Copa América GS	Mexico	0–0	Ecuador	Glendale, United States
17:00 UTC−7		Report		Stadium: State Farm Stadium; Attendance: 62,565; Referee: Mario Escobar (Guatemala)

7 September 2024 Friendly	Mexico	3–0	New Zealand	Pasadena, United States
18:00 UTC−7	Pineda 5'; Huerta 53'; Romo 57'	Report		Stadium: Rose Bowl; Attendance: 25,271; Referee: Joe Dickerson (United States)

10 September 2024 Friendly	Mexico	0–0	Canada	Arlington, United States
20:00 UTC−5		Report		Stadium: AT&T Stadium; Attendance: 32,623; Referee: Victor Rivas (United States)

12 October 2024 Unofficial friendly	Mexico	2–2	(Spain) Valencia	Puebla, Mexico
20:00 UTC−6	Vega 8'; Herrera 33'	Report	Gómez 43', 62'	Stadium: Estadio Cuauhtémoc; Referee: Juan Gabriel Calderón (Costa Rica)

15 October 2024 Friendly	Mexico	2–0	United States	Zapopan, Mexico
20:30 UTC−6	Jiménez 22'; Huerta 49'	Report		Stadium: Estadio Akron; Attendance: 43,537; Referee: Keylor Herrera (Costa Rica)

15 November 2024 2024–25 Nations League QF	Honduras	2–0	Mexico	San Pedro Sula, Honduras
20:00 UTC−6	Palma 64', 83'	Report		Stadium: Estadio Francisco Morazán; Attendance: 12,866; Referee: Walter López (Guatemala)

19 November 2024 2024–25 Nations League QF	Mexico	4–0 (4–2 agg.)	Honduras	Toluca, Mexico
20:30 UTC−6	Jiménez 42'; Martín 72', 90' (pen.); J. Sánchez 85'	Report		Stadium: Estadio Nemesio Díez; Attendance: 26,898; Referee: Drew Fischer (Canada)

=== 2025 ===
16 January 2025 Unofficial friendly	Internacional (Brazil)	0–2	Mexico	Porto Alegre, Brazil
15:00 UTC−3		Report	Lira 34'; Rubalcava 45+1'	Stadium: Estádio Beira-Rio; Attendance: 43,011; Referee: Rafael Klein (Brazil)

21 January 2025 Unofficial friendly	River Plate (Argentina)	2–0	Mexico	Buenos Aires, Argentina
19:00 UTC−3	Galoppo 7'; Borja 33'	Report		Stadium: Estadio Monumental; Attendance: 84,593; Referee: Sebastián Martínez (Argentina)

20 March 2025 2025 Nations League SF	Canada	0–2	Mexico	Inglewood, United States
19:30 UTC−7		Report	Jiménez 1', 75'	Stadium: SoFi Stadium; Attendance: 50,295; Referee: Saíd Martínez (Honduras)

23 March 2025 2025 Nations League F	Mexico	2–1	Panama	Inglewood, United States
18:30 UTC−7	Jiménez 8', 90+2' (pen.)	Report	Carrasquilla 45+2' (pen.)	Stadium: SoFi Stadium; Attendance: 68,212; Referee: Mario Escobar (Guatemala)

7 June 2025 Friendly	Mexico	2–4	Switzerland	Salt Lake City, United States
14:00 UTC−6	Giménez 51'; Sepúlveda 75'	Report	Embolo 20'; Amdouni 64'; Ndoye 71'; Rieder 90'	Stadium: Rice–Eccles Stadium; Attendance: 41,508; Referee: Victor Rivas (United States)

10 June 2025 Friendly	Mexico	1–0	Turkey	Chapel Hill, United States
20:30 UTC−4	Pineda 45'	Report		Stadium: Kenan Stadium; Attendance: 25,606; Referee: Moeth Gaymes (Saint Vincent and the Grenadines)

14 June 2025 2025 Gold Cup GS	Mexico	3–2	Dominican Republic	Inglewood, United States
19:15 UTC−7	E. Álvarez 45+1'; Jiménez 47'; Montes 53'	Report	Peter 51'; Azcona 67'	Stadium: SoFi Stadium; Attendance: 54,309; Referee: Oshane Nation (Jamaica)

18 June 2025 2025 Gold Cup GS	Suriname	0–2	Mexico	Arlington, United States
21:00 UTC−5		Report	Montes 57', 63'	Stadium: AT&T Stadium; Attendance: 34,015; Referee: Selvin Brown (Honduras)

22 June 2025 2025 Gold Cup GS	Mexico	0–0	Costa Rica	Paradise, United States
19:00 UTC−7		Report		Stadium: Allegiant Stadium; Attendance: 35,000; Referee: Mario Escobar (Guatemala)

28 June 2025 2025 Gold Cup QF	Mexico	2–0	Saudi Arabia	Glendale, United States
19:15 UTC−7	Vega 49'; Madu 81' (o.g.)	Report		Stadium: State Farm Stadium; Attendance: 45,255; Referee: Lukasz Szpala (United States)

2 July 2025 2025 Gold Cup SF	Mexico	1–0	Honduras	Santa Clara, United States
19:00 UTC−7	Jiménez 50'	Report		Stadium: Levi's Stadium; Attendance: 70,975; Referee: Juan Gabriel Calderón (Costa Rica)

6 July 2025 2025 Gold Cup F	United States	1–2	Mexico	Houston, United States
18:00 UTC−5	Richards 4'	Report	Jiménez 27'; E. Álvarez 77'	Stadium: NRG Stadium; Attendance: 70,925; Referee: Mario Escobar (Guatemala)

6 September 2025 Friendly	Mexico	0–0	Japan	Oakland, United States
19:00 UTC−7		Report		Stadium: Oakland Coliseum; Attendance: 12,457; Referee: Rubiel Vazquez (United States)

9 September 2025 Friendly	Mexico	2–2	South Korea	Nashville, United States
20:00 UTC−5	Jiménez 22'; Giménez 90+4'	Report	Son Heung-min 65'; Oh Hyeon-gyu 75'	Stadium: Geodis Park; Attendance: 27,604; Referee: Guido Gonzales Jr. (United States)

11 October 2025 Friendly	Mexico	0–4	Colombia	Arlington, United States
20:00 UTC−5		Report	Lucumí 16'; Díaz 56'; Lerma 64'; Carbonero 87'	Stadium: AT&T Stadium; Attendance: 72,438; Referee: Ismail Elfath (United States)

14 October 2025 Friendly	Mexico	1–1	Ecuador	Zapopan, Mexico
20:30 UTC−6	Berterame 3'	Report	Alcívar 20' (pen.)	Stadium: Estadio Akron; Attendance: 41,235; Referee: Victor Rivas (United States)

15 November 2025 Friendly	Mexico	0–0	Uruguay	Torreón, Mexico
19:00 UTC−6		Report		Stadium: Estadio Corona; Attendance: 24,000; Referee: Fernando Morón (Panama)

18 November 2025 Friendly	Mexico	1–2	Paraguay	San Antonio, United States
18:30 UTC−6	Jiménez 54' (pen.)	Report	Sanabria 48'; Bobadilla 56'	Stadium: Alamodome; Attendance: 28,076; Referee: Joe Dickerson (United States)

=== 2026 ===
22 January 2026 Friendly	Panama	0–1	Mexico	Panama City, Panama
20:00 UTC−5		Report	Peralta 90+3' (o.g.)	Stadium: Estadio Rommel Fernández; Attendance: 16,447; Referee: Guido Gonzales Jr. (United States)

25 January 2026 Friendly	Bolivia	0–1	Mexico	Santa Cruz de la Sierra, Bolivia
15:30 UTC−4		Report	Berterame 68'	Stadium: Estadio Ramón Tahuichi Aguilera; Attendance: 24,000; Referee: Carlos Betancur (Colombia)

25 February 2026 Friendly	Mexico	4–0	Iceland	Querétaro, Mexico
20:00 UTC−6	Ledezma 22'; A. González 24'; Gallardo 59'; B. Gutiérrez 90+2'	Report		Stadium: Estadio Corregidora; Attendance: 34,130; Referee: Steven Madrigal (Costa Rica)

28 March 2026 Friendly	Mexico	0–0	Portugal	Mexico City, Mexico
20:00 UTC−6		Report		Stadium: Estadio Azteca; Attendance: 84,130; Referee: Walter López (Guatemala)

31 March 2026 Friendly	Mexico	1–1	Belgium	Chicago, United States
20:00 UTC−5	J. Sánchez 19'	Report	Lukébakio 46'	Stadium: Soldier Field; Attendance: 52,412; Referee: Rosendo Mendoza (United States)

22 May 2026 Friendly	Mexico	2–0	Ghana	Puebla, Mexico
20:00 UTC−6	B. Gutiérrez 2'; Martínez 54'	Report		Stadium: Estadio Cuauhtémoc; Attendance: 41,235; Referee: Selvin Brown (Honduras)

30 May 2026 Friendly	Mexico	1–0	Australia	Pasadena, United States
18:00 UTC−7	Vásquez 27'	Report		Stadium: Rose Bowl; Attendance: 78,479; Referee: Rubiel Vazquez (United States)

4 June 2026 Friendly	Mexico	5–1	Serbia	Toluca, Mexico
20:00 UTC−6	Vásquez 34'; Bukinac 45+3' (o.g.); Jiménez 57'; Avdić 72' (o.g.); L. Chávez 90'	Report	Stanić 19'	Stadium: Estadio Nemesio Díez; Attendance: 27,163; Referee: Keylor Herrera (Costa Rica)

11 June 2026 2026 FIFA World Cup GS	Mexico	2–0	South Africa	Mexico City, Mexico
13:00 UTC−6	Quiñones 9'; Jiménez 67'	Report		Stadium: Estadio Azteca; Attendance: 80,824; Referee: Wilton Sampaio (Brazil)

18 June 2026 2026 FIFA World Cup GS	Mexico	1–0	South Korea	Zapopan, Mexico
19:00 UTC−6	Romo 50'	Report		Stadium: Estadio Akron; Attendance: 45,522; Referee: Gustavo Tejera (Uruguay)

24 June 2026 2026 FIFA World Cup GS	Czech Republic	0–3	Mexico	Mexico City, Mexico
19:00 UTC−6		Report	M. Chávez 55'; Quiñones 61'; Fidalgo 90+4'	Stadium: Estadio Azteca; Attendance: 80,824; Referee: Yael Falcón (Argentina)

30 June 2026 2026 FIFA World Cup R32	Mexico	2–0	Ecuador	Mexico City, Mexico
20:00 UTC−6	Quiñones 22'; Jiménez 31'	Report		Stadium: Estadio Azteca; Attendance: 80,824; Referee: Slavko Vinčić (Slovenia)

5 July 2026 2026 FIFA World Cup R16	Mexico	2–3	England	Mexico City, Mexico
19:00 UTC−6	Quiñones 42'; Jiménez 69' (pen.)	Report	Bellingham 36', 38'; Kane 60' (pen.)	Stadium: Estadio Azteca; Attendance: 80,824; Referee: Alireza Faghani (Australia)

26 September 2026 Friendly	Mexico	1–1	Colombia	Baltimore, United States
21:00 UTC−4	Mora 62'	Report	Suárez 9'	Stadium: M&T Bank Stadium; Attendance: 67,117; Referee: Guido Gonzales Jr. (United States)

29 September 2026 Friendly	Mexico	1–1	Peru	Harrison, United States
21:00 UTC−4	Guzmán 49'	Report	Vélez 26'	Stadium: Sports Illustrated Stadium; Attendance: 25,728; Referee: Jon Freemon (United States)

3 October 2026 Friendly	United States	3–0	Mexico	Glendale, United States
19:00 UTC−7	Hall 28'; Sullivan 62'; Tillman 84'	Report		Stadium: State Farm Stadium; Attendance: 64,932; Referee: Selvin Brown (Honduras)

6 October 2026 Friendly	Mexico	0–2	Chile	Los Angeles, United States
19:30 UTC−7		Report	Gutiérrez 54'; Pizarro 65'	Stadium: Los Angeles Memorial Coliseum; Attendance: 56,529; Referee: Filip Dujic (Canada)

== Upcoming matches ==
The following matches are currently scheduled:

=== 2026 ===
14 November 2026 2026–27 Nations League QF 1st Leg	Jamaica	v	Mexico	Kingston, Jamaica
20:00 UTC−5		Report		Stadium: Independence Park

17 November 2026 2026–27 Nations League QF 2nd Leg	Mexico	v	Jamaica	Guadalupe, Mexico
20:30 UTC−6		Report		Stadium: Estadio BBVA

== Head to head records ==
As of 3 October 2026

Head to head records
Opponent	Pld	W	D	L	GF	GA	W%	D%	L%
Algeria	1	0	1	0	2	2	0	100	0
Argentina	1	0	0	1	0	2	0	0	100
Australia	2	1	1	0	3	2	100	0	100
Belgium	1	0	1	0	1	1	0	100	0
Bolivia	2	2	0	0	2	0	100	0	0
Brazil	1	0	0	1	2	3	0	0	100
Cameroon	1	0	1	0	2	2	0	100	0
Canada	5	2	2	1	6	4	40	40	20
Chile	2	0	1	2	2	4	0	100	50
Colombia	5	1	2	4	6	12	20	40	80
Costa Rica	5	3	1	0	4	0	60	60	0
Czech Republic	1	1	0	0	3	0	100	0	0
Dominican Republic	1	1	0	0	3	2	100	0	150
Ecuador	5	1	3	1	5	4	100	125	66.67
El Salvador	3	3	0	0	5	0	100	0	0
England	1	0	0	1	2	3	0	0	100
Germany	1	0	1	0	2	2	0	100	0
Ghana	2	2	0	0	4	0	100	0	0
Guatemala	4	3	1	0	8	0	75	25	0
Haiti	1	1	0	0	3	1	100	0	0
Honduras	10	7	1	2	18	4	77.78	11.11	22.22
Iceland	2	2	0	0	10	1	100	0	0
Iraq	1	1	0	0	4	0	100	0	0
Jamaica	6	4	2	0	12	5	66.67	33.33	0
Japan	2	1	1	0	2	0	50	50	0
Netherlands	1	1	0	0	1	0	100	0	0
New Zealand	1	1	0	0	3	0	100	0	0
Nigeria	2	2	0	0	6	1	100	0	0
Panama	8	7	1	0	13	2	87.5	12.5	0
Paraguay	2	0	0	2	1	3	0	0	100
Peru	5	2	2	1	3	2	40	40	20
Poland	1	0	1	0	0	0	0	100	0
Portugal	1	0	1	0	0	0	0	0	0
Qatar	1	0	0	1	0	1	0	0	100
Saudi Arabia	2	2	0	0	4	1	33.33	0	0
Serbia	1	1	0	0	5	1	100	0	100
South Africa	1	1	0	0	2	0	100	0	0
South Korea	3	2	1	0	6	4	100	33.33	0
Suriname	3	3	0	0	7	0	100	0	0
Sweden	1	0	0	1	1	2	0	0	100
Switzerland	1	0	0	1	2	4	0	0	100
Trinidad and Tobago	1	0	1	0	0	0	0	100	0
Turkey	1	1	0	0	1	0	100	0	0
United States	9	2	2	6	7	17	22.22	22.22	88.89
Uruguay	3	0	1	2	0	7	0	0	100
Uzbekistan	1	0	1	0	3	3	0	100	0
Venezuela	1	0	0	1	0	1	0	0	100
Wales	1	0	0	1	0	1	0	0	100
Totals	99	52	24	23	152	84	52.53	24.24	23.23
