= 2025 CONCACAF Gold Cup Group A =

Football competition

Group A of the 2025 CONCACAF Gold Cup consisted of Costa Rica, Dominican Republic, Mexico and Suriname. Teams in this group stage played from June 14 to 22, 2025. The top two teams, Mexico and Costa Rica, advanced to the quarter-finals after winning their opening two matches, while the other two teams were eliminated after two games.

== Standings ==
Pos	Team	Pld	W	D	L	GF	GA	GD	Pts	Qualification
1	Mexico	3	2	1	0	5	2	+3	7	Advance to knockout stage
2	Costa Rica	3	2	1	0	6	4	+2	7	Advance to knockout stage
3	Dominican Republic	3	0	1	2	3	5	−2	1	
4	Suriname	3	0	1	2	3	6	−3	1	

Source: CONCACAF
Rules for classification: Tiebreakers

In the quarter-finals:

- The winners of Group A, Mexico, advanced to play the runners-up of Group D, Saudi Arabia.
- The runners-up of Group A, Costa Rica, advanced to play the winners of Group D, the United States.

== Matches ==
=== Mexico vs Dominican Republic ===
The two teams had met three times previously, but this was the first meeting at the Gold Cup.

June 14, 2025
22:15 (19:15 UTC−7)

Mexico	3–2	Dominican Republic
Ed. Álvarez 44'; Jiménez 47'; Montes 53'	Report	Peter 51'; Azcona 67'

SoFi Stadium, Inglewood
Attendance: 54,309
Referee: Oshane Nation (Jamaica)

Mexico	Dominican Republic

GK	1	Luis Malagón
RB	2	Jorge Sánchez
CB	15	Israel Reyes		(substituted off) 46'
CB	3	César Montes		(substituted off) 83'
LB	23	Jesús Gallardo	(yellow card) 90+6'
RM	25	Roberto Alvarado
CM	6	Érik Lira
CM	4	Edson Álvarez (c)
LM	17	Orbelín Pineda		(substituted off) 46'
CF	11	Santiago Giménez		(substituted off) 73'
CF	9	Raúl Jiménez		(substituted off) 83'
Substitutions:
MF	8	Carlos Rodríguez		(substituted on) 46'
FW	10	Alexis Vega		(substituted on) 46'
FW	16	Julián Quiñones	(yellow card) 90+5'	(substituted on) 73'
MF	19	Jesús Orozco		(substituted on) 83'
FW	21	César Huerta		(substituted on) 83'
Manager:
Javier Aguirre

GK	12	Xavier Valdez
CB	18	Jimmy Kaparos
CB	6	Pablo Rosario
CB	4	Edgar Pujol
RWB	2	Joao Urbáez		(substituted off) 90'
LWB	5	Noah Dollenmayer		(substituted off) 61'
RM	19	Peter González
CM	8	Heinz Mörschel	(yellow card) 65'	(substituted off) 79'
CM	14	Jean Carlos López (c)	(yellow card) 77'
LM	11	Edarlyn Reyes		(substituted off) 61'
CF	17	Dorny Romero		(substituted off) 79'
Substitutions:
DF	23	Luiyi de Lucas		(substituted on) 61'
FW	13	Edison Azcona		(substituted on) 61'
MF	10	Ronaldo Vásquez		(substituted on) 79'
FW	25	Erick Japa	(yellow card) 80'	(substituted on) 79'
MF	16	Juanca Pineda		(substituted on) 90'
Manager:
(Argentina) Marcelo Neveleff

Player of the Match:
Edson Álvarez (Mexico)

Assistant referees:
Caleb Wales (Trinidad and Tobago)
Ojay Duhaney (Jamaica)
Fourth official:
Bryan López (Guatemala)
Video assistant referee:
Edvin Jurisevic (United States)
Assistant video assistant referee:
Ben Whitty (Cayman Islands)

=== Costa Rica vs Suriname ===
June 15, 2025
23:00 (20:00 UTC−7)

Costa Rica	4–3	Suriname
Martínez 14'; Ugalde 19' (pen.), 90+13' (pen.); Alcócer 76'	Report	Kerk 34'; Margaret 59'; Pinas 64' (pen.)

Snapdragon Stadium, San Diego
Attendance: 7,736
Referee: Joe Dickerson (United States)

Costa Rica	Suriname

GK	1	Keylor Navas (c)
CB	3	Jeyland Mitchell
CB	5	Fernán Faerrón
CB	15	Francisco Calvo
RWB	22	Carlos Mora		(substituted off) 78'
LWB	8	Joseph Mora		(substituted off) 78'
CM	16	Alejandro Bran		(substituted off) 66'
CM	14	Orlando Galo
CM	10	Brandon Aguilera		(substituted off) 66'
CF	12	Alonso Martínez	(yellow card) 4'	(substituted off) 85'
CF	9	Manfred Ugalde
Substitutions:
FW	19	Kenneth Vargas		(substituted on) 66'
FW	20	Josimar Alcócer		(substituted on) 66'
DF	11	Ariel Lassiter		(substituted on) 78'
FW	17	Warren Madrigal		(substituted on) 78'
FW	7	Andy Rojas		(substituted on) 85'
Manager:
(Mexico) Miguel Herrera

GK	23	Etienne Vaessen
CB	3	Liam van Gelderen
CB	4	Dion Malone (c)	(yellow card) 84'
CB	19	Shaquille Pinas
RWB	2	Anfernee Dijksteel		(substituted off) 46'
LWB	5	Ridgeciano Haps
CM	10	Denzel Jubitana		(substituted off) 88'
CM	22	Kenneth Paal
CM	9	Denzel Jubitana		(substituted off) 88'
CF	7	Gyrano Kerk
CF	20	Gleofilo Vlijter	(yellow card) 53'	(substituted off) 66'
Substitutions:
DF	12	Myenty Abena		(substituted on) 46'
MF	24	Dhoraso Klas		(substituted on) 66'
MF	14	Jean-Paul Boëtius		(substituted on) 88'
FW	21	Jaden Montnor		(substituted on) 88'
Manager:
(Netherlands) Stanley Menzo

Player of the Match:
Manfred Ugalde (Costa Rica)

Assistant referees:
Cameron Blanchard (United States)
Logan Brown (United States)
Fourth official:
Steffon Dewar (Jamaica)
Video assistant referee:
Chris Penso (United States)
Assistant video assistant referee:
Allen Chapman (United States)

=== Costa Rica vs Dominican Republic ===
June 18, 2025
19:06 (18:06 UTC−5)

Costa Rica	2–1	Dominican Republic
Ugalde 44' (pen.); Alcócer 85'	Report	Urbáez 16'

AT&T Stadium, Arlington
Attendance: 34,015
Referee: Lukasz Szpala (United States)

Costa Rica	Dominican Republic

GK	1	Keylor Navas (c)
CB	3	Jeyland Mitchell
CB	4	Juan Pablo Vargas
CB	15	Francisco Calvo
RWB	22	Carlos Mora
LWB	8	Joseph Mora	(yellow card) 41'
CM	10	Brandon Aguilera		(substituted off) 80'
CM	14	Orlando Galo
CM	20	Josimar Alcócer	(yellow card) 87'	(substituted off) 88'
CF	9	Manfred Ugalde	(yellow card) 49'	(substituted off) 90'
CF	12	Alonso Martínez		(substituted off) 80'
Substitutions:
FW	7	Andy Rojas		(substituted on) 80'
FW	19	Kenneth Vargas	(yellow card) 90+4'	(substituted on) 80'
DF	24	Guillermo Villalobos		(substituted on) 88'
FW	21	Álvaro Zamora		(substituted on) 90'
Manager:
(Mexico) Miguel Herrera

GK	12	Xavier Valdez
RB	2	Joao Urbáez	(yellow card) 49'	(substituted off) 90'
CB	18	Jimmy Kaparos
CB	4	Edgar Pujol		(substituted off) 71'
LB	5	Noah Dollenmayer
DM	6	Pablo Rosario	(yellow card) 90+2'
RM	14	Jean Carlos López (c)
CM	8	Heinz Mörschel		(substituted off) 90'
CM	19	Peter González		(substituted off) 77'
LM	11	Edarlyn Reyes		(substituted off) 77'
CF	17	Dorny Romero
Substitutions:
DF	23	Luiyi de Lucas	(yellow card) 75'	(substituted on) 71'
FW	7	Rafael Núñez		(substituted on) 77'
MF	10	Ronaldo Vásquez		(substituted on) 77'
MF	20	Lucas Bretón		(substituted on) 90'
MF	16	Juanca Pineda		(substituted on) 90'
Other disciplinary actions:
FW	25	Erick Japa	(yellow card) 50'
Manager:
(Argentina) Marcelo Neveleff

Player of the Match:
Josimar Alcócer (Costa Rica)

Assistant referees:
Cory Richardson (United States)
Nick Uranga (United States)
Fourth official:
Pierre-Luc Lauzière (Canada)
Video assistant referee:
Edvin Jurisevic (United States)
Assistant video assistant referee:
Allen Chapman (United States)

=== Suriname vs Mexico ===
June 18, 2025
22:00 (21:00 UTC−5)

Suriname	0–2	Mexico
	Report	Montes 57', 63'

AT&T Stadium, Arlington
Attendance: 34,015
Referee: Selvin Brown (Honduras)

Suriname	Mexico

GK	23	Etienne Vaessen
CB	12	Myenty Abena
CB	4	Dion Malone (c)	(substituted off) 65'
CB	19	Shaquille Pinas
RWB	3	Liam van Gelderen
LWB	5	Ridgeciano Haps
RM	10	Denzel Jubitana	(substituted off) 71'
CM	14	Jean-Paul Boëtius	(substituted off) 65'
CM	22	Kenneth Paal
LM	7	Gyrano Kerk	(substituted off) 86'
CF	9	Richonell Margaret
Substitutions:
MF	24	Dhoraso Klas	(substituted on) 65'
FW	20	Gleofilo Vlijter	(substituted on) 65'
MF	6	Immanuel Pherai	(substituted on) 71'
FW	21	Jaden Montnor	(substituted on) 86'
Manager:
(Netherlands) Stanley Menzo

GK	1	Luis Malagón
RB	15	Israel Reyes
CB	3	César Montes	(yellow card) 88'
CB	5	Johan Vásquez		(substituted off) 76'
LB	23	Jesús Gallardo
RM	25	Roberto Alvarado
CM	4	Edson Álvarez (c)
CM	14	Marcel Ruiz		(substituted off) 72'
LM	10	Alexis Vega		(substituted off) 72'
CF	16	Julián Quiñones		(substituted off) 72'
CF	9	Raúl Jiménez		(substituted off) 64'
Substitutions:
FW	11	Santiago Giménez		(substituted on) 64'
MF	24	Luis Chávez		(substituted on) 72'
FW	21	César Huerta		(substituted on) 72'
FW	18	Ángel Sepúlveda		(substituted on) 72'
MF	19	Jesús Orozco		(substituted on) 76'
Manager:
Javier Aguirre

Player of the Match:
César Montes (Mexico)

Assistant referees:
Gerson Orellana (Honduras)
Roney Salinas (Honduras)
Fourth official:
Julio Luna (Guatemala)
Video assistant referee:
Ben Whitty (Cayman Islands)
Assistant video assistant referee:
Chris Penso (United States)

=== Mexico vs Costa Rica ===
June 22, 2025
22:00 (19:00 UTC−7)

Mexico	0–0	Costa Rica
	Report

Allegiant Stadium, Paradise
Attendance: 35,000
Referee: Mario Escobar (Guatemala)

Mexico	Costa Rica

GK	1	Luis Malagón
RB	2	Jorge Sánchez
CB	3	César Montes	(yellow card) 57'
CB	5	Johan Vásquez
LB	26	Mateo Chávez		(substituted off) 70'
CM	4	Edson Álvarez (c)
CM	24	Luis Chávez	(yellow card) 72'
RW	25	Roberto Alvarado		(substituted off) 75'
AM	14	Marcel Ruiz		(substituted off) 75'
LW	10	Alexis Vega		(substituted off) 88'
CF	9	Raúl Jiménez		(substituted off) 69'
Substitutions:
FW	11	Santiago Giménez		(substituted on) 69'
DF	23	Jesús Gallardo		(substituted on) 70'
MF	8	Carlos Rodríguez		(substituted on) 75'
FW	21	César Huerta		(substituted on) 75'
FW	16	Julián Quiñones		(substituted on) 88'
Manager:
Javier Aguirre

GK	1	Keylor Navas (c)
CB	3	Jeyland Mitchell		(substituted off) 65'
CB	4	Juan Pablo Vargas
CB	15	Francisco Calvo	(yellow card) 3'
RWB	22	Carlos Mora	(yellow card) 3'	(substituted off) 58'
LWB	8	Joseph Mora	(yellow card) 54'
CM	10	Brandon Aguilera
CM	14	Orlando Galo	(yellow card) 57'
CM	20	Josimar Alcócer
CF	12	Alonso Martínez		(substituted off) 88'
CF	9	Manfred Ugalde	(yellow card) 84'	(substituted off) 88'
Substitutions:
FW	7	Andy Rojas		(substituted on) 58'
DF	26	Kenay Myrie		(substituted on) 65'
FW	19	Kenneth Vargas		(substituted on) 88'
DF	5	Fernán Faerrón		(substituted on) 88'
Manager:
(Mexico) Miguel Herrera

Player of the Match:
Keylor Navas (Costa Rica)

Assistant referees:
Luis Ventura (Guatemala)
Humberto Panjoj (Guatemala)
Fourth official:
Bryan López (Guatemala)
Video assistant referee:
Edvin Jurisevic (United States)
Assistant video assistant referee:
Dilia Bradley (Guatemala)

=== Dominican Republic vs Suriname ===
June 22, 2025
22:00 (21:00 UTC−5)

Dominican Republic	0–0	Suriname
	Report

AT&T Stadium, Arlington
Attendance: 20,918
Referee: Ismael Cornejo (El Salvador)

Dominican Republic	Suriname

GK	12	Xavier Valdez
RB	2	Joao Urbáez		(substituted off) 46'
CB	4	Edgar Pujol	(red card) 30'
CB	6	Pablo Rosario
LB	5	Noah Dollenmayer	(yellow card) 16'
CM	14	Jean Carlos López (c)
CM	8	Heinz Mörschel	(yellow card) 45+3'	(substituted off) 46'
RW	19	Peter González
AM	10	Ronaldo Vásquez		(substituted off) 35'
LW	11	Edarlyn Reyes		(substituted off) 88'
CF	17	Dorny Romero		(substituted off) 70'
Substitutions:
DF	18	Jimmy Kaparos		(substituted on) 35'
DF	21	Juan Castillo		(substituted on) 46'
MF	16	Juanca Pineda		(substituted on) 46'
DF	23	Luiyi de Lucas		(substituted on) 70'
MF	20	Lucas Bretón		(substituted on) 88'
Manager:
(Argentina) Marcelo Neveleff

GK	1	Warner Hahn
RB	3	Liam van Gelderen		(substituted off) 74'
CB	12	Myenty Abena	(yellow card) 48'	(substituted off) 90'
CB	19	Shaquille Pinas (c)
LB	17	Djevencio van der Kust	(yellow card) 45'	(substituted off) 66'
CM	24	Dhoraso Klas		(substituted off) 66'
CM	22	Kenneth Paal
RW	7	Gyrano Kerk
AM	10	Denzel Jubitana
LW	9	Richonell Margaret
CF	20	Gleofilo Vlijter		(substituted off) 74'
Substitutions:
MF	6	Immanuel Pherai	(yellow card) 75'	(substituted on) 66'
DF	15	Yannick Leliendal	(yellow card) 86'	(substituted on) 66'
FW	21	Jaden Montnor		(substituted on) 74'
DF	2	Anfernee Dijksteel		(substituted on) 74'
DF	4	Dion Malone		(substituted on) 90'
Manager:
(Netherlands) Stanley Menzo

Player of the Match:
Xavier Valdez (Dominican Republic)

Assistant referees:
Geovany García (El Salvador)
Juan Zumba (El Salvador)
Fourth official:
Reon Radix (Grenada)
Video assistant referee:
Chris Penso (United States)
Assistant video assistant referee:
Shirley Perelló (Honduras)

== Discipline ==
Fair play points would have been used as tiebreakers should the overall and head-to-head records of teams are tied. These were calculated based on yellow and red cards received in all group matches as follows:

- first yellow card: −1 point;
- indirect red card (second yellow card): −3 points;
- direct red card: −4 points;
- yellow card and direct red card: −5 points;

Only one of the above deductions is applied to a player in a single match.

Team	Match 1				Match 2				Match 3				Points
Team	Booked	(yellow card) (yellow-red card)	Sent off (straight red)	(yellow card) (red card)	Booked	(yellow card) (yellow-red card)	Sent off (straight red)	(yellow card) (red card)	Booked	(yellow card) (yellow-red card)	Sent off (straight red)	(yellow card) (red card)	Points
Mexico	2				1				2				–5
Suriname	2								4				–6
Costa Rica	1				4				5				–10
Dominican Republic	3				4				2		1		–13
