= Alfonso Rodríguez Ochoa =

Mexican politician

- Born: 30 January 1949 (age 77); Guadalupe, Nuevo León, Mexico
- Occupation: Politician
- Political party: PRI

Alfonso Rodríguez Ochoa (born 30 January 1949 in Guadalupe, Nuevo León) is a Mexican politician affiliated with the Institutional Revolutionary Party (PRI). In the 2003 mid-terms he was elected to the Chamber of Deputies to represent Nuevo León's 11th district during the 59th session of Congress.
