= Julián Hernández =

Julián Hernández or Julian Hernandez may refer to:

- Julián Hernández Santillán (born 1963), Mexican politician
- Julián Hernández (filmmaker) (born 1972), Mexican film director, film producer, and film editor
