= Juan Manuel Duarte Dávila =

Mexican politician (born 1962)

- Born: 3 December 1962 (age 63); Guadalupe, Nuevo León, Mexico
- Education: UANL
- Occupation: Politician
- Political party: PAN

Juan Manuel Duarte Dávila (born 3 December 1962) is a Mexican politician from the National Action Party (PAN). In the 2000 general election he was elected to the Chamber of Deputies to represent Nuevo León's 11th district during the 58th session of Congress.
