= Héctor García García =

Mexican politician

- Born: 3 May 1963 (age 63); Guadalupe, Nuevo León, Mexico
- Occupation: Politician
- Political party: PRI

Héctor García García (born 3 May 1963 in Guadalupe, Nuevo León) is a Mexican politician affiliated with the Institutional Revolutionary Party (PRI). In the 2012 general election he was elected to the Chamber of Deputies to represent Nuevo León's 11th district during the 62nd session of Congress.
