= María de Jesús Aguirre Maldonado =

Mexican lawyer and politician

- Born: 25 December 1961 (age 64); Valle Hermoso, Tamaulipas, Mexico
- Education: Universidad Autónoma de Nuevo León
- Occupations: Lawyer and politician
- Political party: PRI
- Spouse: Carlos Cerrillo
- Children: Veronica Cerrillo, Carlos Cerrillo

María de Jesús Aguirre Maldonado (born 25 December 1961) is a Mexican lawyer and politician affiliated with the Institutional Revolutionary Party (PRI).

She has been elected to Congress for Nuevo León's 8th district on three occasions: in the 2003 mid-terms; in the 2009 mid-terms; and in the 2021 mid-terms, when she was the president of the Rural Development and Conservation, Agriculture and Food Self-Sufficiency Committee, and a member of the Citizen Security and Social Security Committees.
