= Ernesto Alfonso Robledo =

Mexican politician

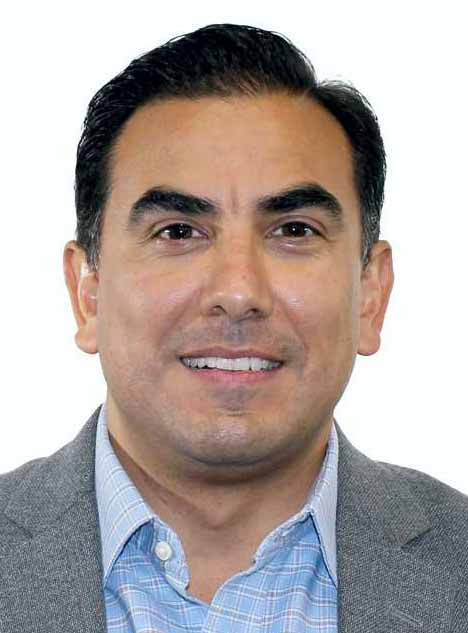
- Ernesto Alfonso Robledo Leal
- Born: 6 June 1976 (age 49); Linares, Nuevo León, Mexico
- Occupation: Politician
- Political party: PAN

Ernesto Alfonso Robledo Leal (born 6 June 1976 in Linares, Nuevo León) is a Mexican politician affiliated with the National Action Party (PAN). In the 2012 general election he was elected to the Chamber of Deputies to represent Nuevo León's 8th district during the 62nd session of Congress. Six years later, in the 2018 general election, he returned to the Chamber of Deputies to represent Nuevo León's 11th district during the 64th session.
