= Juan Francisco Rivera Bedoya =

Mexican politician

- Born: 16 May 1942 (age 84); Matehuala, San Luis Potosí, Mexico
- Education: UANL
- Occupation: Politician
- Political party: PRI

Juan Francisco Rivera Bedoya (born 16 May 1942) is a Mexican politician affiliated with the Institutional Revolutionary Party (PRI). In the 2006 general election he was elected to the Chamber of Deputies to represent Nuevo León's 11th district during the 60th session of Congress.
