= 8th federal electoral district of Nuevo León =

Federal electoral district of Mexico

Nuevo León's 8th
- Electoral district of the Chamber of Deputies of Mexico

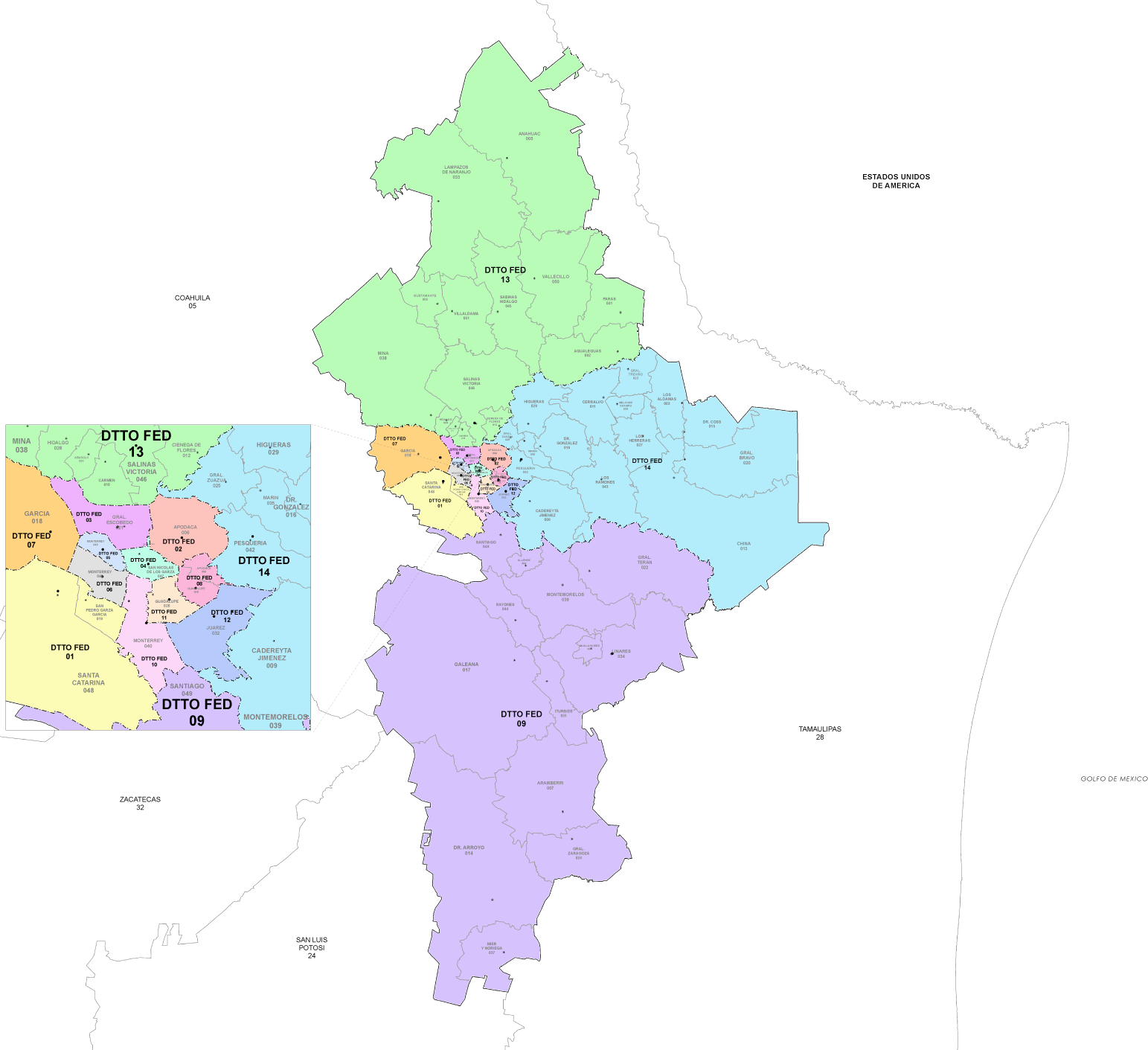
- 8th district

Incumbent
- Member: Adriana Quiroz Gallegos
- Party: ▌Morena
- Congress: 66th (2024–2027)

District
- State: Nuevo León
- Head town: Guadalupe
- Coordinates: 25°40′N 100°15′W
- Covers: Municipalities of Guadalupe (part) and Apodaca (part)
- PR region: Second
- Precincts: 183
- Population: 433,556 (2020 census)

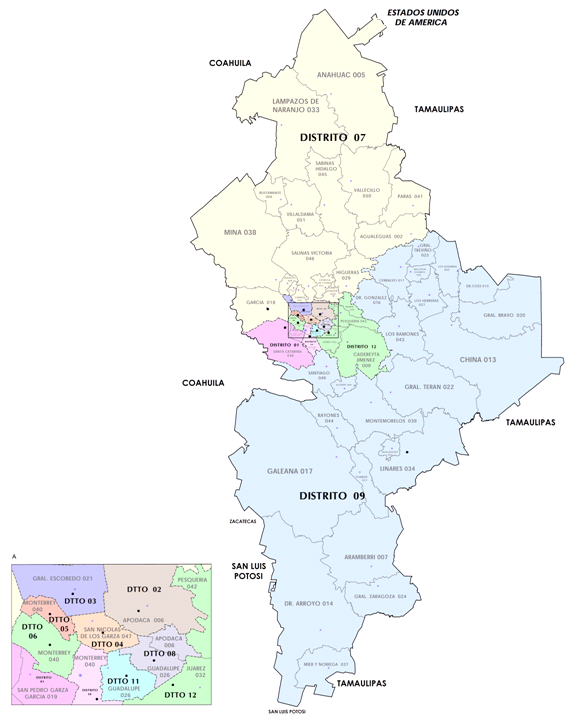
Nuevo León under the 2017 districting plan

The 8th federal electoral district of Nuevo León (Spanish: Distrito electoral federal 08 de Nuevo León) is one of the 300 electoral districts into which Mexico is divided for elections to the federal Chamber of Deputies and one of 14 such districts in the state of Nuevo León.

It elects one deputy to the lower house of Congress for each three-year legislative session by means of the first-past-the-post system. Votes cast in the district also count towards the calculation of proportional representation ("plurinominal") deputies elected from the second region.

The 8th district was created by the 1977 electoral reforms and was first contested in the 1979 mid-term election. The current member for the district, elected in the 2024 general election, is Adriana Quiroz Gallegos of the National Regeneration Movement (Morena).

== District territory ==
In its 2023 districting plan, which is to be used for the 2024, 2027 and 2030 federal elections, the National Electoral Institute (INE) increased Nuevo León's congressional seat allocation from 12 to 14. The 8th district is in the Monterrey metropolitan area and covers parts of two municipalities:

- 83 electoral precincts (secciones electorales) in Guadalupe and 100 precincts in Apodaca. (Note: The remainder of Guadalupe is assigned to the 11th district, and the remainder of Apodaca is assigned to the 2nd district.)

The district's head town (cabecera distrital), where results from individual polling stations are gathered together and tallied, is the city of Guadalupe. The district reported a population of 433,556 in the 2020 census.

== Previous districting schemes ==
Evolution of electoral district numbers
	1974	1978	1996	2005	2017	2023
Nuevo León	7	11	11	12	12	14
Chamber of Deputies	196	300				

2017–2022

Between 2017 and 2022, the district's head town was at Guadalupe. As in the 2023 plan, it covered parts of Guadalupe (70 precincts) and Apodaca (93 precincts).

2005–2017

Under the 2005 districting plan, the district covered 157 precincts in the north of the municipality of Guadalupe, with the remainder of the municipality assigned to the 11th district.

1996–2005

From 1996 to 2005, the district comprised 135 precincts in the north of the municipality of Guadalupe, with the remainder of the municipality assigned to the 11th district.

1978–1996

The districting scheme in force from 1978 to 1996 was the result of the 1977 electoral reforms, which increased the number of single-member seats in the Chamber of Deputies from 196 to 300. Under that plan, Nuevo León's seat allocation rose from 7 to 11. The newly created 8th district's head town was the state capital, Monterrey, and it covered a part of that city.

== Deputies returned to Congress ==
(Mexico) National parties
- Current
- PAN
- PRI
- PT
- PVEM
- MC
- Morena
- PAZ
- Somos
- Defunct or local only
- PLM
- PNR
- PRM
- PNM
- PP
- PPS
- PARM
- PFCRN
- CON
- PANAL
- PSD
- PES
- PES
- PRD

Nuevo León's 8th district
Election	Deputy	Party	Term	Legislature
1979	Francisco Valero Sánchez	Institutional Revolutionary Party	1979–1982	51st Congress
1982	Antonio Medina Ojeda	Institutional Revolutionary Party	1982–1985	52nd Congress
1985	Pedro Ortega Chavira	Institutional Revolutionary Party	1985–1988	53rd Congress
1988	Rosalio Elías Zúñiga Gutiérrez	Institutional Revolutionary Party	1988–1991	54th Congress
1991	Gloria Josefina Mendiola Ochoa	Institutional Revolutionary Party	1991–1994	55th Congress
1994	Antonio Medina Ojeda	Institutional Revolutionary Party	1994–1997	56th Congress
1997	José Armando Jasso Silva	National Action Party (Mexico)	1997–2000	57th Congress
2000	Julián Hernández Santillán	National Action Party (Mexico)	2000–2003	58th Congress
2003	María de Jesús Aguirre Maldonado	Institutional Revolutionary Party	2003–2006	59th Congress
2006	Javier Martín Zambrano Elizondo	National Action Party (Mexico)	2006–2009	60th Congress
2009	María de Jesús Aguirre Maldonado	Institutional Revolutionary Party	2009–2012	61st Congress
2012	Ernesto Alfonso Robledo Leal (Note: Robledo Leal resigned his seat on 1 February 2015 was replaced for the remainder of his term by his alternate, Lomelí Cervantes.); Simón Lomelí Cervantes	National Action Party (Mexico)	2012–2015; 2015	62nd Congress
2015	Daniel Torres Cantú (Note: Originally elected for the PRI, Torres Cantú declared himself an independent on 1 June 2017.)	Institutional Revolutionary Party Independent politician	2015–2018	63rd Congress
2018	Ernesto Alonso Vargas Contreras	Social Encounter Party	2018–2021	64th Congress
2021	María de Jesús Aguirre Maldonado	Institutional Revolutionary Party	2021–2024	65th Congress
2024	Adriana Belinda Quiroz Gallegos	National Regeneration Movement	2024–2027	66th Congress

== Presidential elections ==
Nuevo León's 8th district
Election	District won by	Party or coalition	%
2018	Andrés Manuel López Obrador	Juntos Haremos Historia	38.7005
2024	Claudia Sheinbaum Pardo	Sigamos Haciendo Historia	51.8520
