= 11th federal electoral district of Nuevo León =

Federal electoral district of Mexico

Nuevo León's 11th
- Electoral district of the Chamber of Deputies of Mexico

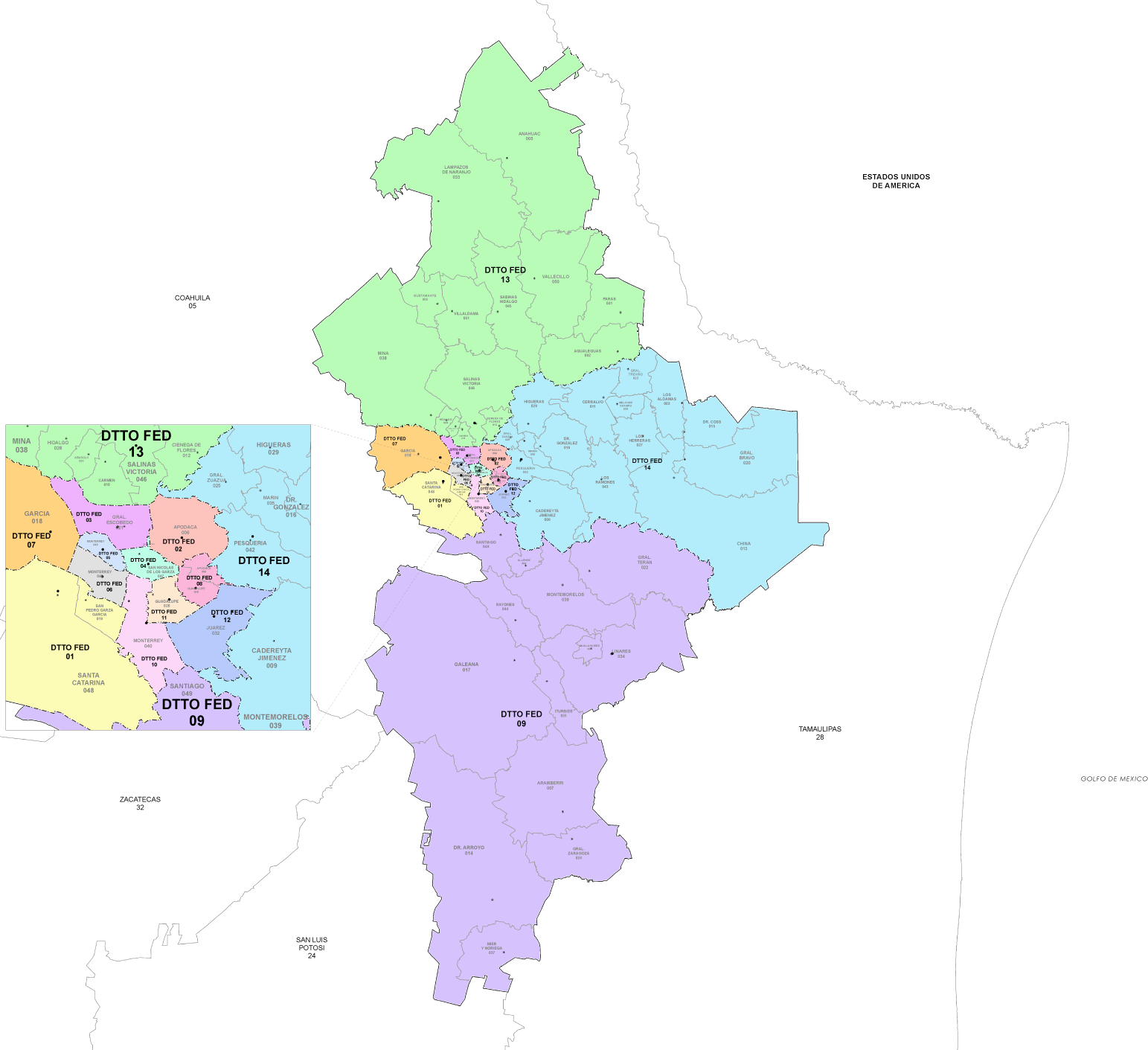
- 11th district

Incumbent
- Member: Samantha Garza de la Garza
- Party: ▌National Action Party
- Congress: 66th (2024–2027)

District
- State: Nuevo León
- Head town: Guadalupe
- Coordinates: 25°40′N 100°15′W
- Covers: Municipality of Guadalupe (part)
- PR region: Second
- Precincts: 222
- Population: 417,573 (2020 census)

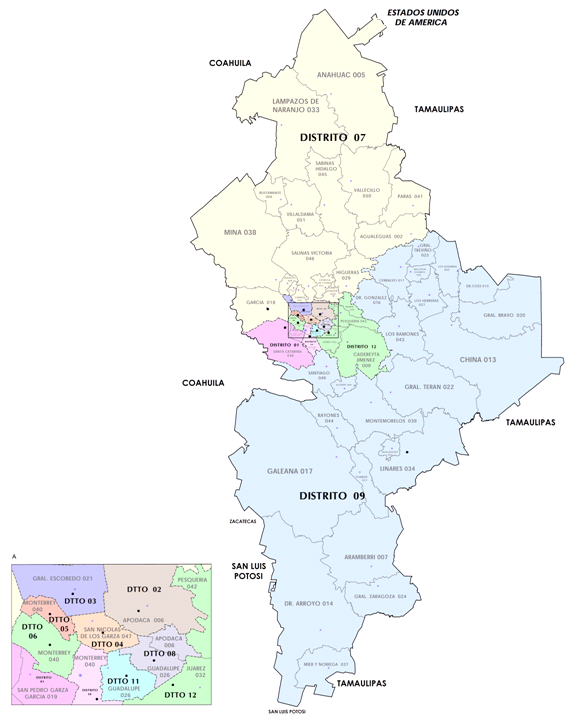
Nuevo León's districts in 2017–2022

The 11th federal electoral district of Nuevo León (Spanish: Distrito electoral federal 11 de Nuevo León) is one of the 300 electoral districts into which Mexico is divided for elections to the federal Chamber of Deputies and one of 14 such districts in the state of Nuevo León.

It elects one deputy to the lower house of Congress for each three-year legislative session by means of the first-past-the-post system. Votes cast in the district also count towards the calculation of proportional representation ("plurinominal") deputies elected from the second region.

The 11th district was created by the 1977 electoral reforms and was first contested in the 1979 mid-term election.

Pedro Garza Treviño of the National Action Party (PAN) was re-elected for the district in the 2024 general election, but requested an indefinite leave of absence from his congressional duties on 2 April 2025. He was replaced by his daughter and alternate, Samantha Margarita Garza de la Garza.

== District territory ==
In its 2023 districting plan, which is to be used for the 2024, 2027 and 2030 federal elections, the National Electoral Institute (INE) increased Nuevo León's congressional seat allocation from 12 to 14. The reconfigured 11th district is in the Monterrey metropolitan area and covers 222 electoral precincts (secciones electorales) in the municipality of Guadalupe. (Note: The remainder of Guadalupe is assigned to the 8th district.)

Its head town (cabecera distrital), where results from individual polling stations are gathered together and tallied, is the city of Guadalupe. The district reported a population of 417,573 in the 2020 census.

== Previous districting schemes ==
Evolution of electoral district numbers
	1974	1978	1996	2005	2017	2023
Nuevo León	7	11	11	12	12	14
Chamber of Deputies	196	300				

2017–2022

Between 2017 and 2022, the district comprised 200 precincts in the municipality of Guadalupe. The 8th district covered the remainder of the municipality.

2005–2017

Under the 2005 districting plan, the district covered 122 precincts in the south of the municipality of Guadalupe, with the northern sector assigned to the 8th district.

1996–2005

From 1996 to 2005, the district covered 169 precincts in the south of the municipality of Guadalupe, with the northern sector assigned to the 8th district.

1978–1996

The districting scheme in force from 1978 to 1996 was the result of the 1977 electoral reforms, which increased the number of single-member seats in the Chamber of Deputies from 196 to 300. Under that plan, Nuevo León's seat allocation rose from 7 to 11. The newly created 11th district's head town was at Santa Catarina and it covered the municipalities of Allende, Cadereyta Jiménez, Montemorelos, Rayones, Santa Catarina and Santiago.

== Deputies returned to Congress ==
(Mexico) National parties
- Current
- PAN
- PRI
- PT
- PVEM
- MC
- Morena
- PAZ
- Somos
- Defunct or local only
- PLM
- PNR
- PRM
- PNM
- PP
- PPS
- PARM
- PFCRN
- CON
- PANAL
- PSD
- PES
- PES
- PRD

Nuevo León's 11th district
Election	Deputy	Party	Term	Legislature
1979	Armando Thomae Serna	Institutional Revolutionary Party	1979–1982	51st Congress
1982	Guillermo Garza Luna	Institutional Revolutionary Party	1982–1985	52nd Congress
1985	Gloria Josefina Mendiola Ochoa	Institutional Revolutionary Party	1985–1988	53rd Congress
1988	Raúl Caballero Escamilla	Institutional Revolutionary Party	1988–1991	54th Congress
1991	Andrés Silva Alvarado	Institutional Revolutionary Party	1991–1994	55th Congress
1994	Néstor Molina Martínez	Institutional Revolutionary Party	1994–1997	56th Congress
1997	Américo Alejandro Ramírez Rodríguez	National Action Party (Mexico)	1997–2000	57th Congress
2000	Juan Manuel Duarte Dávila	National Action Party (Mexico)	2000–2003	58th Congress
2003	Alfonso Rodríguez Ochoa	Institutional Revolutionary Party	2003–2006	59th Congress
2006	Juan Francisco Rivera Bedoya	Institutional Revolutionary Party	2006–2009	60th Congress
2009	Cristina Díaz Salazar	Institutional Revolutionary Party	2009–2012	61st Congress
2012	Héctor García García	Institutional Revolutionary Party	2012–2015	62nd Congress
2015	Pedro Garza Treviño (Note: Garza Treviño requested an indefinite leave of absence from his congressional duties on 1 February 2018; he was replaced by his alternate, Jasso Silva.); José Armando Jasso Silva	National Action Party (Mexico)	2015–2018	63rd Congress
2018	Ernesto Alfonso Robledo Leal (Note: Robledo Leal requested an indefinite leave of absence from his congressional duties on 25 February 2021; he was replaced by his alternate, Serna Vega.); Rafael Alejandro Serna Vega	National Action Party (Mexico)	2018–2021	64th Congress
2021	Pedro Garza Treviño	National Action Party (Mexico)	2021–2024	65th Congress
2024	Pedro Garza Treviño (Note: Garza Treviño requested an indefinite leave of absence from his congressional duties on 2 April 2025; he was replaced by his alternate, Garza de la Garza.); Samantha Margarita Garza de la Garza	National Action Party (Mexico)	2024–2027	66th Congress

== Presidential elections ==
Nuevo León's 11th district
Election	District won by	Party or coalition	%
2018	Andrés Manuel López Obrador	Juntos Haremos Historia	34.1336
2024	Claudia Sheinbaum Pardo	Sigamos Haciendo Historia	43.5463
