= Alonso Martínez (footballer) =

Costa Rican footballer (born 1998)

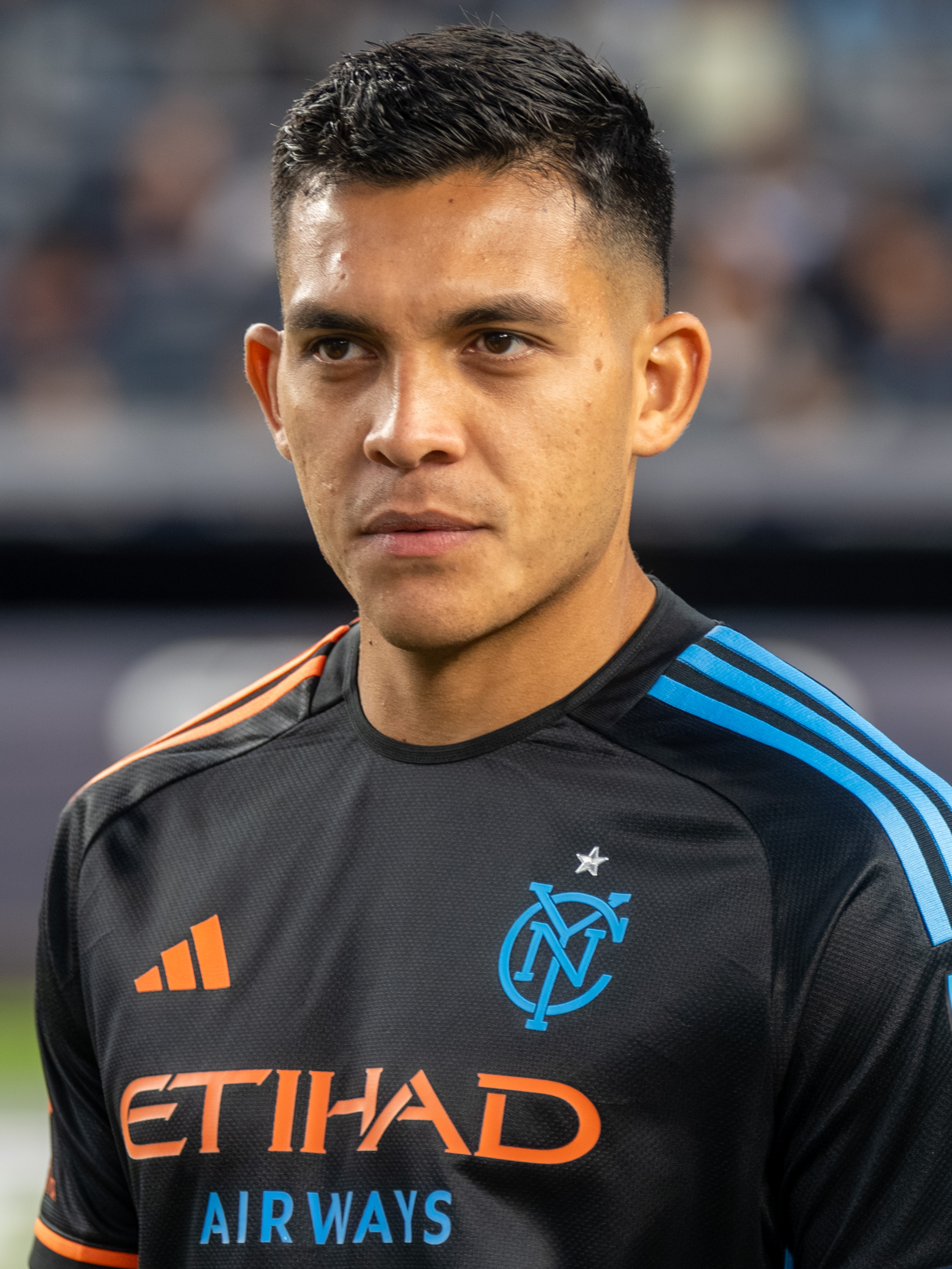
- Martínez with New York City FC in 2025

Personal information
- Full name: Adrián Alonso Martínez Batista
- Date of birth: 15 October 1998 (age 28)
- Place of birth: Puntarenas, Costa Rica
- Height: 1.77 m (5 ft 10 in)
- Positions: Winger; forward

Team information
- Current team: New York City FC
- Number: 16

Senior career*
Years	Team	Apps	(Gls)
2015–2016	Puntarenas		
2016–2021	Alajuelense	42	(11)
2017–2018	→ COFUTPA (loan)	20	(15)
2018–2020	→ Guadalupe (loan)	53	(11)
2021–2023	Lommel	35	(8)
2021	→ Alajuelense (loan)	14	(4)
2023–	New York City FC	65	(34)

International career^{‡}
2021	Costa Rica U23	3	(0)
2021–	Costa Rica	31	(8)
- * Club domestic league appearances and goals as of 28 October 2026 ‡ National team caps and goals as of 13 November 2025

Adrián Alonso Martínez Batista (born 15 October 1998) is a Costa Rican professional footballer who plays as a winger or forward for Major League Soccer club New York City FC and the Costa Rica national team.

== Club career ==
On 18 August 2021, Martínez joined Belgian First Division B club Lommel on a five-year deal, returning to Alajuelense until the end of the year.

=== New York City FC ===
On 4 August 2023, it was announced that Martínez had signed with Major League Soccer club New York City FC. On 31 May 2024, Martinez came on as a substitute and scored a 10-minute hat-trick in a 5–1 win vs San Jose Earthquakes. Martinez had a breakout season with NYCFC with his scoring displays. Despite playing a winger for most of his career, New York City FC coach Nick Cushing decided to play Martinez as a striker; Martinez had a career high 16 goals in the 2024 MLS Season and helped guide NYCFC into the playoffs after missing out in 2023.

== International career ==
Martínez was called up to the Costa Rica national team on 9 May 2021 for the 2021 CONCACAF Nations League Finals, and was included in the final 23 on 25 May. He made his debut on 3 June 2021 in a semi-final against Mexico.

He had also played for the U-23 team for the 2020 Summer Olympics qualifying, debuting on 18 March 2021, with a 1–0 defeat to the United States U-23.

== Career statistics ==
=== Club ===
As of match played 28 October 2026

Appearances and goals by club, season and competition
Club	Season	League			National cup		Continental		Other		Total	
Club	Season	Division	Apps	Goals	Apps	Goals	Apps	Goals	Apps	Goals	Apps	Goals
Alajuelense	2016–17	Liga FPD	0	0	—		—		—		0	0
Alajuelense	2017–18	Liga FPD	0	0	0	0	—		—		0	0
Alajuelense	2018–19	Liga FPD	7	0	—		—		—		7	0
Alajuelense	2020–21	Liga FPD	35	11	—		6 (Note: Two appearances in CONCACAF Champions Cup, four appearances and one goal in CONCACAF League)	1	—		41	12
Alajuelense	Total		42	11	—		6	1	—		48	12
COFUTPA (loan)	2017–18	Segunda División de Costa Rica	20	15	—		—		—		20	15
Guadalupe (loan)	2018–19	Liga FPD	18	2	—		—		—		18	2
Guadalupe (loan)	2019–20	Liga FPD	35	11	—		—		—		35	11
Guadalupe (loan)	Total		53	13	—		—		—		53	13
Lommel	2022–23	Challenger Pro League	35	8	1	0	—		—		36	8
Alajuelense (loan)	2021–22	Liga FPD	14	4	—		2 (Note: Appearances in CONCACAF League)	1	1 (Note: Appearance in Supercopa de Costa Rica)	0	17	5
New York City FC	2023	MLS	3	0	—		—		—		3	0
New York City FC	2024	MLS	26	16	—		—		9 (Note: Five appearances and one goal in Leagues Cup, four appearances and one goal in MLS Cup playoffs)	2	35	18
New York City FC	2025	MLS	30	17	0	0	—		6 (Note: Three appearances and two goals in Leagues Cup, three appearances and two goals in MLS Cup playoffs)	4	36	21
New York City FC	2026	MLS	6	1	0	0	—		0	0	6	1
New York City FC	Total		65	34	0	0	—		15	6	80	40
Career total			229	85	1	0	8	2	16	6	254	93

=== International ===
As of match played 13 November 2025

Appearances and goals by national team and year
National team	Year	Apps	Goals
Costa Rica	2021	6	0
Costa Rica	2022	6	0
Costa Rica	2023	2	0
Costa Rica	2024	5	1
Costa Rica	2025	10	7
Total		31	8

Scores and results list Costa Rica's goal tally first.

List of international goals scored by Alonso Martínez
No.	Date	Venue	Opponent	Score	Result	Competition
1.	18 November 2024	Estadio Rommel Fernández, Panama City, Panama	Panama	2–2	2–2	2024–25 CONCACAF Nations League A
2.	25 March 2025	Estadio Nacional, San José, Costa Rica	Belize	3–0	6–1	2025 CONCACAF Gold Cup qualification
3.	7 June 2025	BFA Technical Centre, Wildey, Barbados	Bahamas	1–0	8–0	2026 FIFA World Cup qualification
4.	15 June 2025	Snapdragon Stadium, San Diego, United States	Suriname	1–0	4–3	2025 CONCACAF Gold Cup
5.	29 June 2025	U.S. Bank Stadium, Minneapolis, United States	United States	2–2	2–2 (3–4 p)	2025 CONCACAF Gold Cup
6.	9 September 2025	Estadio Nacional, San José, Costa Rica	Haiti	2–0	3–3	2026 FIFA World Cup qualification
7.	13 October 2025	Estadio Nacional, San José, Costa Rica	Nicaragua	1–0	4–1	2026 FIFA World Cup qualification
8.	13 October 2025	Estadio Nacional, San José, Costa Rica	Nicaragua	2–1	4–1	2026 FIFA World Cup qualification

== Honours ==
Alajuelense

- Liga FPD: Apertura 2020
- CONCACAF League: 2020
