= Javier Zambrano Elizondo =

Mexican politician

- Born: 3 November 1962 (age 63); Nuevo León, Mexico
- Occupation: Politician
- Political party: PAN

Javier Martín Zambrano Elizondo (born 3 November 1962) is a Mexican politician affiliated with the National Action Party (PAN). In the 2006 general election he was elected to the Chamber of Deputies to represent Nuevo León's 8th district during the 60th session of Congress.
