= Denzel Jubitana =

Belgian footballer

Personal information
- Full name: Denzel Jubitana
- Date of birth: 6 May 1999 (age 27)
- Place of birth: Antwerp, Belgium
- Height: 1.75 m (5 ft 9 in)
- Positions: Attacking midfielder; forward

Team information
- Current team: Atromitos
- Number: 11

Youth career
- 2004–2006: Turk Sport
- 2006–2010: Beveren
- 2010–2015: Lierse
- 2015–2018: Mechelen

Senior career*
Years	Team	Apps	(Gls)
2018–2021	Waasland-Beveren	38	(2)
2021–2022	Roda	15	(2)
2022–2023	Iraklis	39	(22)
2023–	Atromitos	76	(12)

International career^{‡}
2024–	Suriname	15	(1)
- * Club domestic league appearances and goals as of 27 April 2026 ‡ National team caps and goals as of 19 November 2025

Denzel Jubitana (born 6 May 1999) is a professional footballer who plays as a midfielder for Super League Greece club Atromitos. Born in Belgium, he represents the Suriname national team.

== Club career ==
Playing for S.K. Beveren, Jubitana scored his first goal in the Belgian top flight on 18 August 2018 against Sint-Truiden.

On 19 July 2021, Jubitana signed a one-year contract with Roda JC Kerkrade after completing a successful trial.

On 4 February 2022, Jubitana moved to Iraklis in Greece.

=== Atromitos ===
On 25 June 2023, he signed a three-year contract with top tier club Atromitos. On 23 September 2023, Jubitana scored his first goal in a 1–1 away draw against OFI.

== International career ==
On 26 August 2024, Jubitana got called up for the Suriname national football team for their Nations League matches against Guyana and Guadeloupe. He subsequently scored his first international goal in a 5–1 win over Guyana.

The following year, he featured for the country at the 2025 CONCACAF Gold Cup.

== Personal life ==
Born in Belgium, Jubitana is of Surinamese decent. His grandfather, Rudi Jubitana, was also a Surinamese international footballer.

== Career statistics ==
As of 17 April 2026

Club	Season	League			Cup		Continental		Other		Total	
Club	Season	Division	Apps	Goals	Apps	Goals	Apps	Goals	Apps	Goals	Apps	Goals
Waasland-Beveren	2018–19	Belgian First Division A	18	2	0	0	—		—		18	2
Waasland-Beveren	2019–20	Belgian First Division A	15	0	0	0	—		—		15	0
Waasland-Beveren	2020–21	Belgian First Division A	5	0	1	0	—		—		6	0
Waasland-Beveren	Total		38	2	1	0	—		—		39	2
Roda	2021–22	Eerste Divisie	15	2	2	0	—		—		17	2
Iraklis	2021–22	Superleague Greece 2	17	8	—		—		—		17	8
Iraklis	2022–23	Superleague Greece 2	22	14	1	0	—		—		23	14
Iraklis	Total		39	22	1	0	—		—		40	22
Atromitos	2023–24	Superleague Greece	23	3	3	2	—		—		26	5
Atromitos	2025–25	Superleague Greece	23	4	1	0	—		—		24	4
Atromitos	2025–26	Superleague Greece	28	5	5	0	—		—		33	5
Atromitos	Total		74	12	9	2	—		—		83	14
Career total			166	38	13	2	0	0	0	0	179	40

=== International ===
As of match played 25 September 2026

Scores and results list Suriname's goal tally first, score column indicates score after each Jubitana goal.

List of international goals scored by Denzel Jubitana
No.	Date	Venue	Opponent	Score	Result	Competition
1	25 September 2026	Chelato Uclés National Stadium, Tegucigalpa, Honduras	Honduras	2–2	3–2	2026–27 CONCACAF Nations League A
