= Edson Álvarez =

Mexican footballer (born 1997)

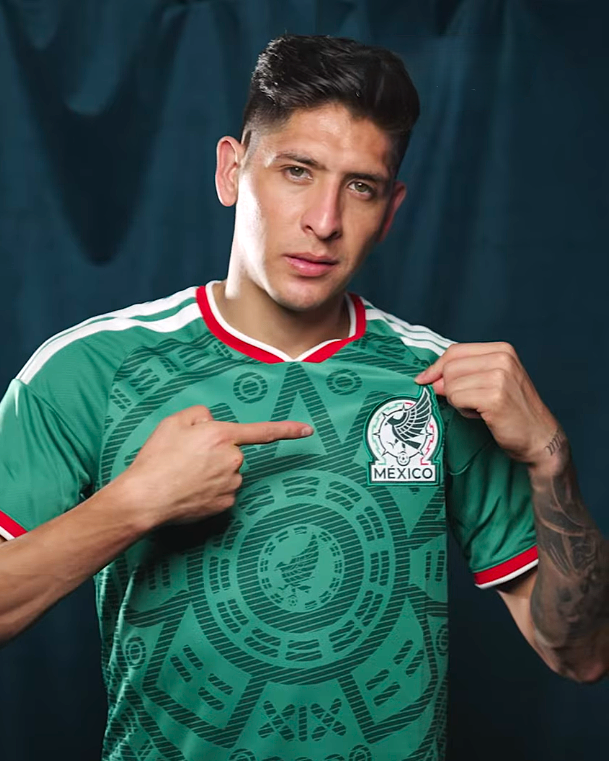
- Álvarez with Mexico in 2025

Personal information
- Full name: Edson Omar Álvarez Velázquez
- Date of birth: 24 October 1997 (age 29)
- Place of birth: Tlalnepantla, State of Mexico, Mexico
- Height: 1.87 m (6 ft 2 in)
- Positions: Defensive midfielder; centre-back

Team information
- Current team: West Ham United
- Number: 4

Youth career
- –2014: Pachuca
- 2014–2016: América

Senior career*
Years	Team	Apps	(Gls)
2016–2019	América	86	(5)
2019–2023	Ajax	98	(10)
2023–	West Ham United	60	(1)
2025–2026	→ Fenerbahçe (loan)	12	(0)

International career^{‡}
2015	Mexico U18	2	(1)
2017	Mexico U20	10	(1)
2017–	Mexico	102	(7)
Medal record
Men's football
Representing Mexico
CONCACAF Gold Cup
Winner	2019 United States
Winner	2023 United States–Canada
Winner	2025 United States–Canada
Runner-up	2021 United States
CONCACAF Nations League
Winner	2025 United States
Runner-up	2021 United States
Runner-up	2024 United States
Third place	2023 United States
- * Club domestic league appearances and goals as of 21 November 2026 ‡ National team caps and goals as of 6 July 2026

Edson Omar Álvarez Velázquez (Spanish pronunciation: [ˈedson ˈalβaɾes]; born 24 October 1997) is a Mexican professional footballer who plays as a defensive midfielder or centre-back for EFL Championship club West Ham United, and the Mexico national team.

== Early life ==
Álvarez was born in Tlalnepantla de Baz, a municipality just north of Mexico City, to Adriana Velázquez and Evaristo Álvarez. As a child he worked for his family's business of manufacturing football kits for local teams, which he cites as his first foray into the sport. At the age of 10, Álvarez joined Pachuca, before leaving the club just two years later due to his short stature. Contemplating quitting football, to the resistance of his parents who believed he had the talent to pursue his dream of playing professionally, Álvarez decided to try out for Club América's youth team, eventually making the team after a three-month tryout. He would make it to the daily team practices by way of a three-to-four-hour round trip commute from his home in Tlalnepantla and the club's training ground in Coapa. According to Álvarez, he would spend almost 70 percent of his monthly salary toward transportation.

== Club career ==
=== América ===
In 2014, at age 16, Álvarez joined Club América's youth system, playing for the under-17 team. The following year, while still playing for the under-17 squad, Álvarez was promoted to América's second division team.

In August 2016, first team coach Ignacio Ambríz gave Álvarez his first call-up, sitting on the bench in América's week 5 league match against Monarcas Morelia, using the jersey number 282. On 29 October, newly appointed coach Ricardo La Volpe gave 19-year-old Álvarez his Liga MX debut in the team's win over Santos Laguna; he played all 90 minutes and was voted third in a Man of the Match online poll by club fans. On 25 December, he scored his first career goal in the Apertura final against Tigres UANL.

Prior to the start of the 2017–18 season, Álvarez was handed the number 4 shirt, which was vacated following the departure of Erik Pimentel.

On 16 December 2018, Álvarez was given the start for the return leg of the Apertura final against Cruz Azul, playing in midfield in place of the injured Mateus Uribe, and scored twice as América won its 13th league title following a 2–0 aggregate score. On 23 February 2019, Álvarez made his 100th competitive appearance for América in the team's 3–0 victory over Lobos BUAP.

=== Ajax ===
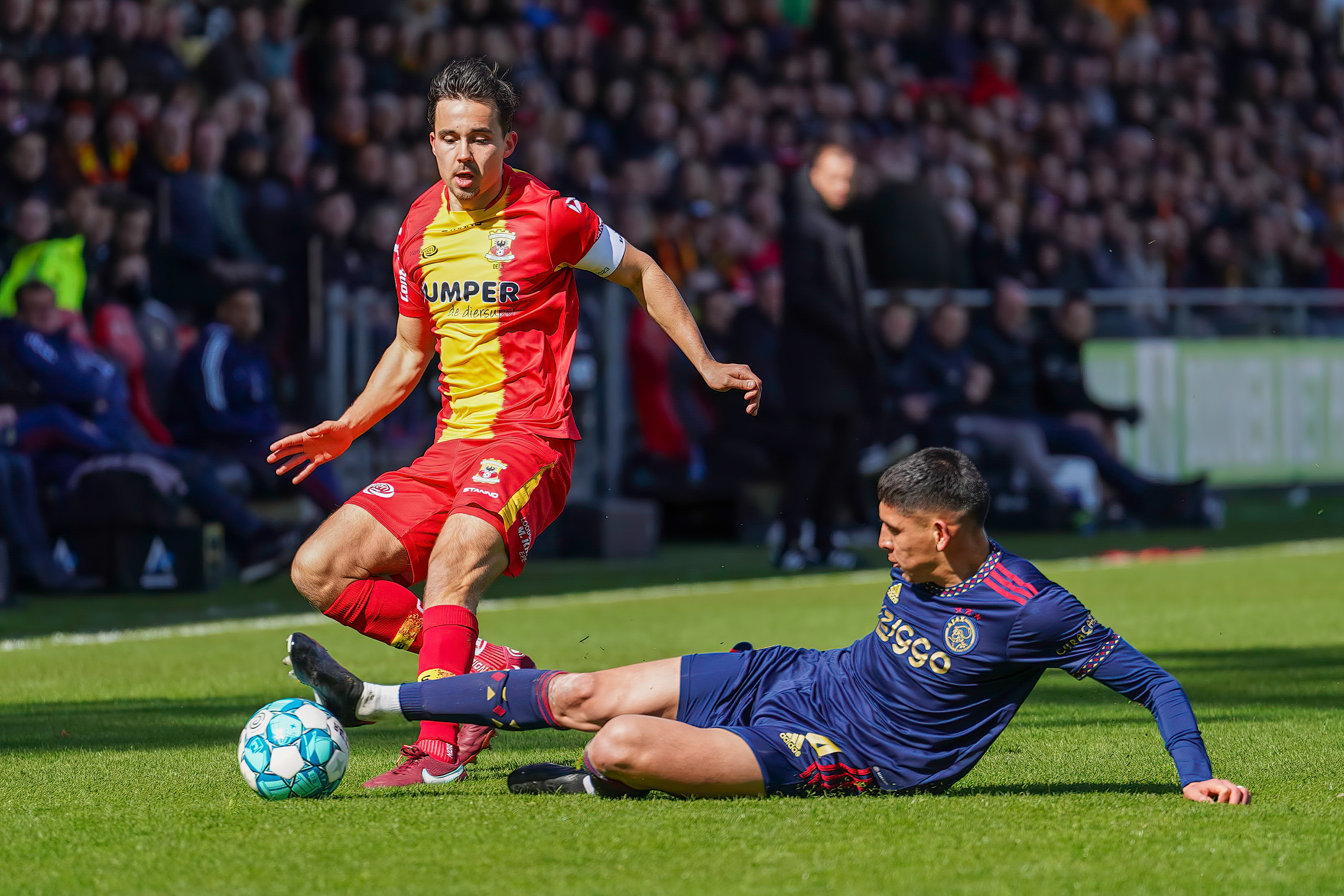
Álvarez (right) tackling against Go Ahead Eagles in 2023

On 19 July 2019, Dutch club AFC Ajax announced an agreement with Club América for the signing of Álvarez on a five-year contract, subject to a medical, for a reported fee of US$17 million. He passed his medical and was officially presented on 22 July, being handed the number 4 shirt which had been vacated following the departure of Matthijs de Ligt. The club announced an official transfer sum of €15 million. On 17 August, Álvarez made his competitive debut for Ajax as a 74th-minute substitute in the team's 4–1 league win over VVV-Venlo. On 29 August, Álvarez scored his first goal in his first start against APOEL in the second-leg of the UEFA Champions League play-off round. On 17 September, Álvarez scored the second goal in the 3–0 Champions League group stage victory over Lille, becoming the first Mexican player to score on his Champions League debut.

On 21 March 2021, Álvarez scored his first Eredivisie goal for Ajax in a 5–0 victory over ADO Den Haag. On 18 April, in the Dutch Cup final against Vitesse, he played the entirety of the match in a 2–1 victory. At the end of his second season, he was nominated for the league Player of the Year Award.

On 27 October 2021, it was announced Álvarez had signed a contract extension with Ajax, keeping him with the club until 2025. On 30 April 2022 he was inducted into the club's Club van 100, making his 100th appearance in a 3–0 league victory over PEC Zwolle, becoming the 174th player in the history of the club to join the ranks.

=== West Ham United ===
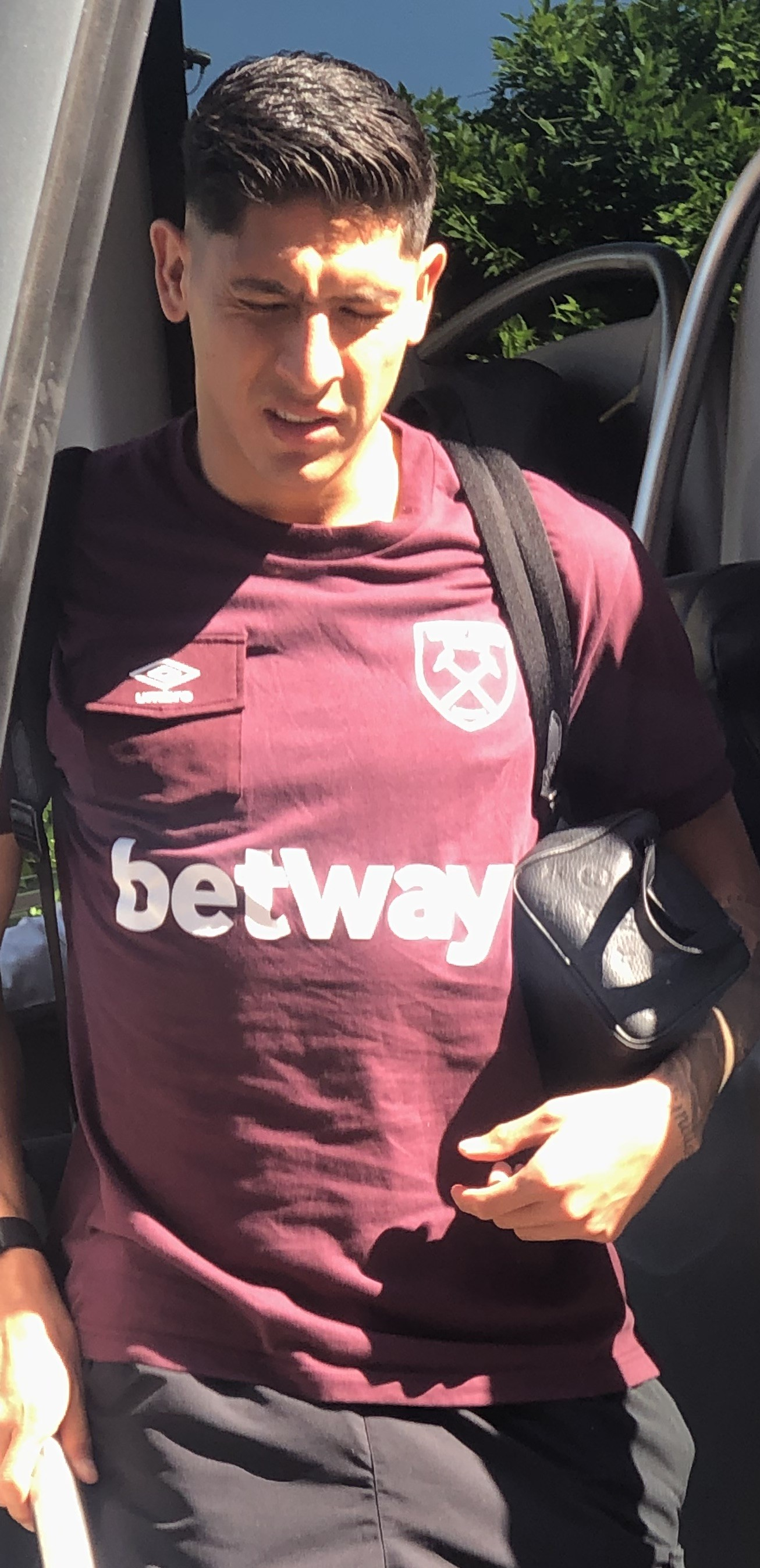
Álvarez with West Ham United in 2024

On 10 August 2023, English club West Ham United announced they had signed Álvarez on a five-year contract for a reported fee of £35 million. He was handed the number 19 jersey. He became the fourth Mexican player, after Guillermo Franco, Pablo Barrera, and Javier Hernández, to represent West Ham United. He made his debut on 20 August, coming on as an 81st-minute substitute for James Ward-Prowse in a 3–1 victory against Chelsea.

On 14 December 2023, Álvarez scored his first goal for West Ham, scoring against SC Freiburg in a 2–0 victory in the Europa League. On 2 March 2024, in a 3–1 win against Everton at Goodison Park, Álvarez scored his first Premier league goal collecting a pass from Jarrod Bowen in the 5th minute of added-time.

==== Loan to Fenerbahçe ====
On 23 August 2025, Álvarez joined Süper Lig club Fenerbahçe on a season-long loan with option to buy. He became the second Mexican player after Diego Reyes, to represent Fenerbahçe. On 31 August 2025, he made his league debut with the team in a 3–1 away victory over Gençlerbirliği. On 2 October 2025, he made his continental debut for the club against OGC Nice in 2–1 league stage win in the UEFA Europa League.

== International career ==
=== Youth ===
Álvarez was called up to the under-20 team camp preparing for the 2017 CONCACAF U-20 Championship en route to the 2017 FIFA U-20 World Cup. He was included in the tournament's best XI. Álvarez was included in the World Cup under-20 squad, and scored the winning goal in Mexico's 3–2 win over Group B minnows Vanuatu.

=== Senior ===
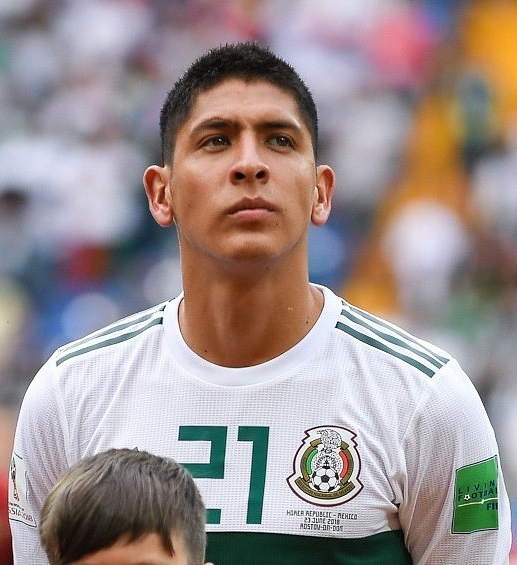
Álvarez prior to the 2018 FIFA World Cup match against South Korea

On 30 January 2017, Álvarez received his first call up to the senior national team for a friendly against Iceland. He made his senior debut on 8 February against Iceland, replacing Jesús Molina in the 60th minute. Along with Alejandro Mayorga, he was cited to be a supporting practice squad player with the Confederations Cup team. He was called up to the Gold Cup, making him the youngest player on the squad. The roster was largely composed of alternate players, as the primary squad was in Russia competing in the Confederations Cup. On 17 July, in the last game of the group stage against Curaçao, Álvarez scored his first goal for the national team in their 2–0 win, becoming the youngest Mexican player to score a goal in a Gold Cup tournament at 19 years old.

In May 2018, Álvarez was named to Mexico's preliminary 28-man squad for the World Cup. He was the youngest player on the list. He was ultimately included in the final 23-man roster revealed on 4 June. He appeared in all of Mexico's group stage matches; in Mexico's final group match against Sweden, Álvarez started at right-back and scored an own goal at the 74th minute when the ball deflected off his left thigh in Mexico's 3–0 loss. He also started in the round-of-16 defeat to Brazil.

In May 2019, Álvarez was included in Gerardo Martino's provisional Gold Cup roster. In a friendly match against Venezuela, he suffered an apparent knee injury but was revealed to only be a scare. He was included in the final list for the competition. Álvarez appeared as a starter in five matches, including the final, as Mexico would go on to win the tournament.

In October 2022, Álvarez was named in Mexico's preliminary 31-man squad for the World Cup, and in November, was ultimately included in the final 26-man roster. Álvarez played in the group stage draw against Poland as well as the win against Saudi Arabia.

On 6 July 2025, he scored the winning goal in the 2025 CONCACAF Gold Cup final in the 2–1 victory over the United States and was awarded the Golden Ball award, signifying the best player of the tournament.

Álvarez was named in the 26-man squad for the 2026 FIFA World Cup, hosted on home soil. On 11 June 2026, he made his 100th international appearance for Mexico, coming on as a substitute in a 2–0 win against South Africa in the opening match of the tournament. (Note: Álvarez played in a match against Martinique in 2019, but it is not recognised as an official international by FIFA.)

== Career statistics ==
=== Club ===
As of match played 8 August 2026

Appearances and goals by club, season and competition
Club	Season	League			National cup (Note: Includes Copa MX, KNVB Cup, FA Cup, Turkish Cup)		League cup (Note: Includes EFL Cup)		Continental		Other		Total	
Club	Season	Division	Apps	Goals	Apps	Goals	Apps	Goals	Apps	Goals	Apps	Goals	Apps	Goals
América	2016–17	Liga MX	21	2	6	0	—		—		1 (Note: Appearance in FIFA Club World Cup)	0	28	2
América	2017–18	Liga MX	31	0	4	0	—		4 (Note: Appearances in CONCACAF Champions League)	0	—		39	0
América	2018–19	Liga MX	34	3	12	0	—		—		—		46	3
América	Total		86	5	22	0	—		4	0	1	0	113	5
Ajax	2019–20	Eredivisie	12	0	3	0	—		8 (Note: Seven appearances and two goals in UEFA Champions League, one appearance in UEFA Europa League)	2	—		23	2
Ajax	2020–21	Eredivisie	24	2	5	0	—		10 (Note: Four appearances in UEFA Champions League, six appearances in UEFA Europa League)	0	—		39	2
Ajax	2021–22	Eredivisie	31	5	3	0	—		7 (Note: Appearances in UEFA Champions League)	0	0	0	41	5
Ajax	2022–23	Eredivisie	31	3	4	0	—		8 (Note: Six appearances and one goal in UEFA Champions League, two appearances in UEFA Europa League)	1	1 (Note: Appearance in Johan Cruyff Shield)	0	44	4
Ajax	Total		98	10	15	0	—		33	3	1	0	147	13
West Ham United	2023–24	Premier League	31	1	1	0	3	0	7 (Note: Appearances in UEFA Europa League)	1	—		42	2
West Ham United	2024–25	Premier League	28	0	1	0	2	0	—		—		31	0
West Ham United	2026–27	Championship	0	0	0	0	1	0	—		—		1	0
West Ham United	Total		59	1	2	0	6	0	7	1	—		74	2
Fenerbahçe (loan)	2025–26	Süper Lig	12	0	1	0	—		5	0	0	0	18	0
Career total			255	16	40	0	6	0	49	4	2	0	352	20

=== International ===
As of match played 5 July 2026

Appearances and goals by national team and year
National team	Year	Apps	Goals
Mexico	2017	9	1
Mexico	2018	11	0
Mexico	2019	10 (Note: Álvarez additionally played a match against Martinique in 2019, which is not recognized by FIFA.)	1
Mexico	2020	3	0
Mexico	2021	18	0
Mexico	2022	9	1
Mexico	2023	14	1
Mexico	2024	8	1
Mexico	2025	13	2
Mexico	2026	7	0
Total		102	7

Scores and results list Mexico's goal tally first, score column indicates score after each Álvarez goal.

List of international goals scored by Edson Álvarez
No.	Date	Venue	Opponent	Score	Result	Competition
1	16 July 2017	Alamodome, San Antonio, United States	Curaçao	2–0	2–0	2017 CONCACAF Gold Cup
2	15 November 2019	Estadio Rommel Fernández, Panama City, Panama	Panama	2–0	3–0	2019–20 CONCACAF Nations League A
3	27 March 2022	Estadio Olímpico Metropolitano, San Pedro Sula, Honduras	Honduras	1–0	1–0	2022 FIFA World Cup qualification
4	21 November 2023	Estadio Azteca, Mexico City, Mexico	Honduras	2–0	2–0 (a.e.t.)	2023–24 CONCACAF Nations League A
5	21 March 2024	AT&T Stadium, Arlington, United States	Panama	1–0	3–0	2024 CONCACAF Nations League Finals
6	14 June 2025	SoFi Stadium, Inglewood, United States	Dominican Republic	1–0	3–2	2025 CONCACAF Gold Cup
7	6 July 2025	NRG Stadium, Houston, United States	United States	2–1	2–1	2025 CONCACAF Gold Cup final

== Honours ==
América

- Liga MX: Apertura 2018
- Copa MX: Clausura 2019

Ajax

- Eredivisie: 2020–21, 2021–22
- KNVB Cup: 2020–21

Fenerbahçe

- Turkish Super Cup: 2025

Mexico

- CONCACAF Gold Cup: 2019, 2023, 2025
- CONCACAF Nations League: 2024–25

Individual

- CONCACAF U-20 Championship Best XI: 2017
- CONCACAF Best XI: 2018, 2021
- CONCACAF Gold Cup Golden Ball: 2025
- CONCACAF Gold Cup Best XI: 2021, 2025
- IFFHS Men's CONCACAF Best XI: 2020, 2021, 2024, 2025
- CONCACAF Nations League Finals Best XI: 2024, 2025

== See also ==
- List of men's footballers with 100 or more international caps
