= Marcelo Neveleff =

Argentine football manager (born 1963

Personal information
- Full name: Gabriel Marcelo Neveleff
- Date of birth: 9 March 1963 (age 63)
- Place of birth: La Plata, Argentina

Team information
- Current team: Dominican Republic (Head coach)

Managerial career
- Years: Team
- 2007–2008: Sete de Setembro
- 2010–2011: Miami FC (assistant)
- 2011–2012: Wilstermann
- 2012–2013: Aurora
- 2017–2019: New England Revolution (assistant)
- 2019: United States U20 (assistant)
- 2019–2020: Orlando City B
- 2023–: Dominican Republic

Gabriel Marcelo Neveleff (born 9 March 1963) is an Argentine football manager who is the current head coach of Dominican Republic national football team.

== History ==
Neveleff guided Dominican Republic national team to their first major tournament: the 2025 Gold Cup.
