= Julián Hernández Santillán =

Mexican politician (born 1963)

Julián Hernández Santillán (born 6 April 1963 in Nuevo León) is a Mexican politician affiliated with the National Action Party (PAN).

In the 2000 general election he was elected to the Chamber of Deputies to represent Nuevo León's 8th district during the 58th session of Congress. In the 2006 Nuevo León state election he was elected local deputy to serve in the Congress of Nuevo León from 2006 to 2009, where he served as the leader of the PAN faction in the Congress.
