= Peter González (footballer) =

Dominican Republic footballer (b. 2002)

Personal information
- Full name: Peter Federico González Carmona
- Date of birth: 25 July 2002 (age 24)
- Place of birth: Madrid, Spain
- Height: 1.80 m (5 ft 11 in)
- Position: Winger

Team information
- Current team: Górnik Zabrze
- Number: 19

Youth career
- 2011–2014: Getafe Olímpico
- 2014–2015: Ciudad Getafe
- 2015–2021: Real Madrid

Senior career*
Years	Team	Apps	(Gls)
2020–2024	Real Madrid B	111	(13)
2021–2024	Real Madrid	3	(0)
2024	→ Valencia (loan)	15	(0)
2024–2026	Getafe	17	(0)
2025–2026	→ Valladolid (loan)	36	(6)
2026–	Górnik Zabrze	12	(4)

International career^{‡}
2017	Dominican Republic U15	3	(1)
2024	Dominican Republic Olympic	3	(0)
2025–	Dominican Republic	14	(2)
- * Club domestic league appearances and goals as of 14:01, 9 November 2026 (UTC) ‡ National team caps and goals as of 10:19, 18 November 2026 (UTC)

Peter Federico González Carmona (born 25 July 2002), commonly known as Peter, is a professional footballer who plays as a winger for Ekstraklasa club Górnik Zabrze. Born in Spain, he plays for the Dominican Republic national team.

== Club career ==
A youth product of Getafe Olímpico and Ciudad Getafe, Peter joined the youth academy of Real Madrid in 2015. He made his professional debut with Real Madrid in a 2–1 La Liga win over Athletic Bilbao on 22 December 2021.

On 31 January 2024, Peter was loaned to top-tier side Valencia until the end of the season. On 4 July, he moved to fellow league team Getafe on a four-year deal.

On 1 September 2025, Peter moved to Valladolid in the second division on a one-year loan deal.

On 12 July 2026, Peter signed a three-year-contract with Ekstraklasa club Górnik Zabrze. On 8 August 2026, Peter made his Ekstraklasa debut against Radomiak Radom, scoring two goals. The game ended with a 3–1 win for Górnik.

== International career ==
Born in Spain to Dominican parents, He represented the Dominican Republic U15s in the 2017 CONCACAF U15 Championship, with a goal in 3 appearances.

He debuted for the senior team during a 2–2 friendly draw against Puerto Rico on 22 March 2025, and he scored the Dominican Republic's first ever CONCACAF Gold Cup goal on 14 June 2025 during the 3–2 loss against Mexico.

== Career statistics ==
=== Club ===
As of match played 7 November 2026

Appearances and goals by club, season and competition
Club	Season	League			National cup (Note: Includes Copa del Rey, Polish Cup)		Other		Total	
Club	Season	Division	Apps	Goals	Apps	Goals	Apps	Goals	Apps	Goals
Real Madrid Castilla	2020–21	Segunda División B	20	2	—		1 (Note: Appearance in Segunda División B play-offs)	0	21	2
Real Madrid Castilla	2021–22	Primera División RFEF	36	3	—		—		36	3
Real Madrid Castilla	2022–23	Primera Federación	37	6	—		3 (Note: Appearances in Primera Federación play-offs)	0	40	6
Real Madrid Castilla	2023–24	Primera Federación	18	2	—		—		18	2
Real Madrid Castilla	Total		111	13	0	0	4	0	115	13
Real Madrid	2021–22	La Liga	3	0	0	0	0	0	3	0
Valencia (loan)	2023–24	La Liga	15	0	0	0	—		15	0
Getafe	2024–25	La Liga	17	0	4	1	—		21	1
Valladolid (loan)	2025–26	Segunda División	36	6	1	0	—		37	6
Górnik Zabrze	2026–27	Ekstraklasa	12	4	1	0	5 (Note: One appearance in UEFA Champions League, two appearances in UEFA Europa League, two appearances in UEFA Conference League)	0	18	4
Career total			194	23	6	1	9	0	209	24

=== International ===
As of match played 17 November 2026

Appearances and goals by national team and year
National team	Year	Apps	Goals
Dominican Republic	2025	7	2
Dominican Republic	2026	7	0
Total		14	2

Scores and results list Dominican Republic’s goal tally first, score column indicates score after each González goal.

List of international goals scored by Peter González
No.	Date	Venue	Opponent	Score	Result	Competition
1	10 June 2025	Félix Sánchez Olympic Stadium, Santo Domingo, Dominican Republic	Dominica	5–0	5–0	2026 FIFA World Cup qualification
2	14 June 2025	SoFi Stadium, Inglewood, United States	Mexico	1–2	2–3	2025 CONCACAF Gold Cup

== Honours ==
Real Madrid Juvenil A

- UEFA Youth League: 2019–20

Real Madrid

- La Liga: 2021–22

Individual

- CONCACAF Gold Cup Best XI: 2025
