= Guadalupe, Nuevo León =

Ciudad Guadalupe
- City and Municipality
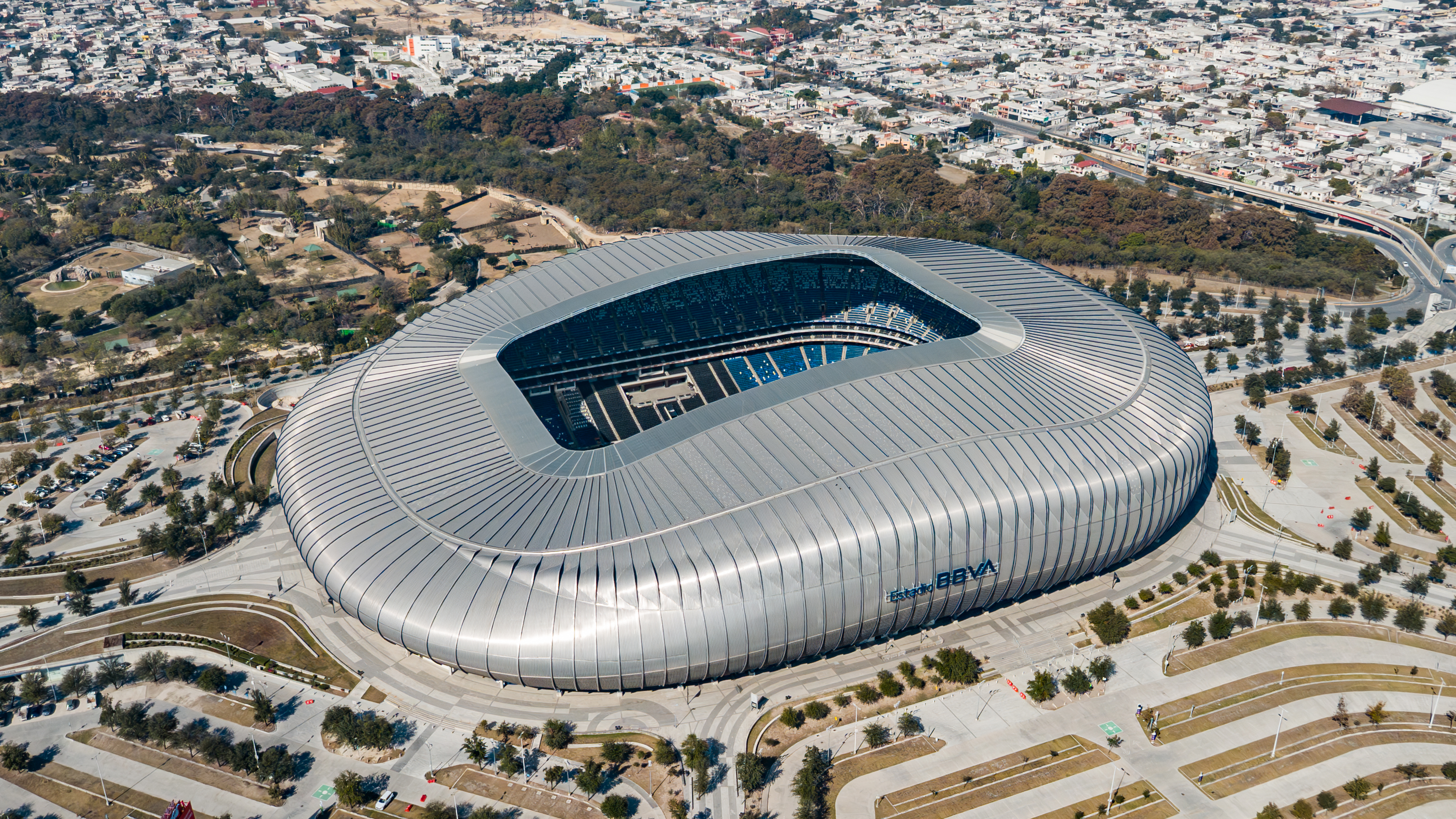

- Coat of arms
- Nickname: Guadalupe
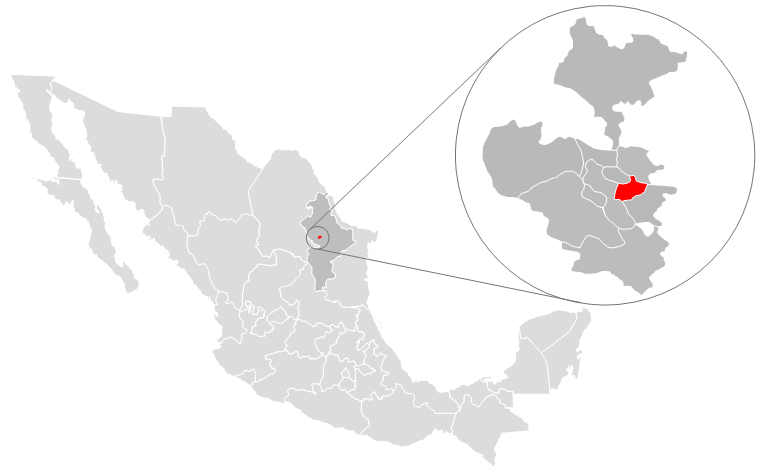
- Coordinates: 25°40′39″N 100°15′35″W
- Country: Mexico
- State: Nuevo León
- Founded: 4 January 1716

Government
  - Mayor: Cristina Díaz (PRI)
  - Federal electoral district: NL-8 & NL-11

Area
  - Municipality: 117.7 km^{2} (45.4 sq mi)
  - City: 95.17 km^{2} (36.75 sq mi)
- Elevation: 500 m (1,600 ft)

Population (2020 census)
  - Municipality: 643,143
  - Density: 5,464/km^{2} (14,150/sq mi)
  - Metro: 5,341,177
  - City: 635,862
  - City density: 6,681/km^{2} (17,300/sq mi)
- Time zone: UTC−06:00 (Zona Centro)
- Website: www.guadalupe.gob.mx

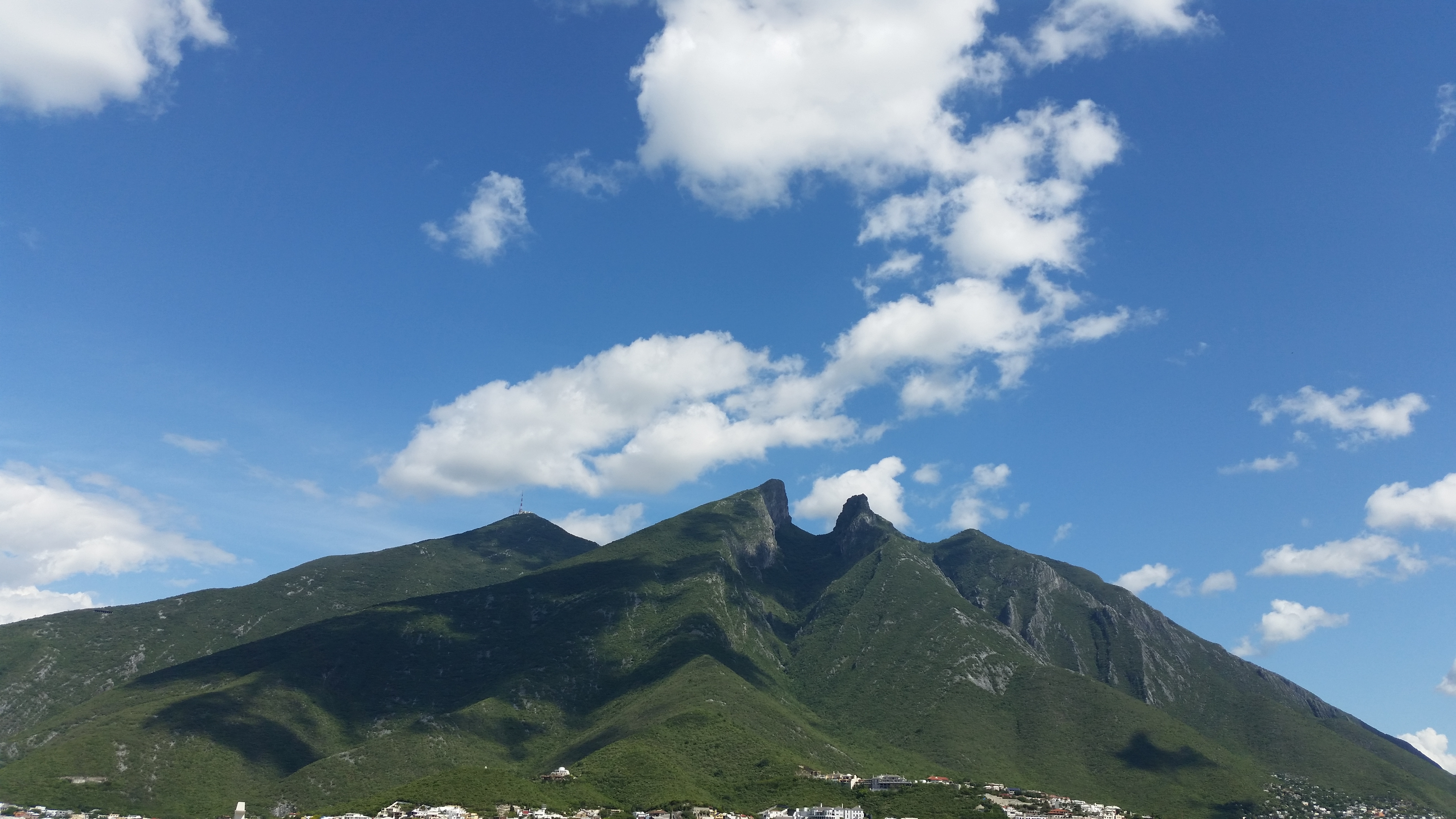
Cerro de la Silla (Saddle Mountain), in Guadalupe, Nuevo León (part of the Monterrey metro area)

Guadalupe is a city and surrounding municipality located in the state of Nuevo León, which is located in northern Mexico. It is part of the Greater Monterrey Metropolitan area.

The municipality of Guadalupe, which lies adjacent to the east side of Monterrey, also borders the municipalities of San Nicolás de los Garza, Apodaca, Pesquería, and Juárez. Covering a territory of 117.7 km^{2} (45.4 sq mi), it is located at 25°40′39″N 100°15′35″W, at an altitude of 500 meters above sea level. As of the 2005 census its official population was 691,434 in the city and 691,931 in the entire municipality. It is the second-largest city and municipality in the state. The municipality has an area of 117.7 km^{2} (45.4 sq mi) (58.42 sq mi).

The city was founded on 4 January 1716, but the land was inhabited long before the official founding. When Monterrey was founded in 1596, the land, which was populated by various indigenous tribes, was ceded to Diego de Montemayor, the founder of Monterrey, but he did not make use of the land. In 1627, the land was turned into large plantations, where sugar cane and corn was raised. The owner of the land around the turn of the 18th century was named Capitán Nicolás Ochoa de Elejalde, but the land was taken from him by the Spanish government and converted into a mission in February 1715. In 1756, the city was renamed the "Pueblo de la Nueva Tlaxcala de Nuestra Señora de Guadalupe de Horcasitas". On 5 March 1825, the city was declared a municipality of Nuevo León and categorized as a villa, even though for many years it continued to be called the "Villa de Guadalupe".

== Tourist attractions ==
Cerro de la Silla: Although it is the icon of the city of Monterrey, it is located in the municipality of Guadalupe and is the preferred place for athletes to climb it and it is also a family walk.

- La Pastora Park: Inside the park, there is a zoo, an aviary, and a herbarium.
- Pipo Park: Park dedicated to the "Pipo" region clown, has walkers along the river and various green areas.
- BBVA Stadium: Opened in 2015 with a seating capacity of 53,500 spectators, Liga MX soccer team Monterrey's home games are played here. The venue has also hosted several concerts since its opening.
- Guadalupe Expo: The Regional Livestock Exhibition is held annually, which in addition to the sample of cattle and sheep, there are mechanical games, restaurants of Mexican snacks and regional dishes and El Domo Care which is where great artists perform.
- Magic Forest: A few meters from the park the shepherdess is this tourist attraction with entertainment for the whole family, some of its attractions are the zombie ride, mice against police, the king loop fighter, ski flyer, etc.
- Tolteca Park: It has the permanent water of the La Silla River, a place for family recreation, it has: boats, slides and soda fountains, grills and snacks.
- Guadalupe City Museum: Dedicated to the approach to the origins of the municipality through its history, geographical features and original settlers.

== Gender Violence Alert ==
Due to the high incidence of femicide-related violence in the municipality, the Gender Violence Alert Against Women was declared on 18 November 2016.

== Patron Saint Celebrations ==
The town celebrates a holy cross named Cristo de la Expiration, "Christ in Expiration", the celebration is held on the second Sunday of the month of August. For the celebration there are various activities including music, fireworks and dancing in the main square.

== Sister cities ==
Guadalupe has three sister cities:

- (United States) - McAllen, Texas, USA
- (United States) - Reno, Nevada, USA
- (United States) - Laredo, Texas, USA
