= 2026 FIFA World Cup Group C =

FIFA World Cup group

Group C of the 2026 FIFA World Cup took place from June 13 to 24, 2026. The group consisted of Brazil, Morocco, Haiti, and Scotland. Brazil, Morocco and Scotland were also drawn together in Group A in the 1998 edition of the competition, which was also Scotland's latest appearance prior to this tournament. This also marked Haiti's first appearance in the World Cup finals since 1974, following a 52-year absence.

Five-time champions Brazil and the previous tournament's fourth-place team Morocco topped the group, with Brazil clinching first place over Morocco based on goal difference. Thus, these two teams advanced to the round of 32.

Scotland finished third in the group with only one win at the group stage, and were eliminated as they were outperformed by third-place teams in other groups. Haiti were the first team eliminated from the tournament after two consecutive group-stage losses, and they finished fourth after losing their third group game against Morocco.

== Teams ==
Draw position	Team	Pot	Confederation	Method of qualification	Date of qualification	Finals appearance	Last appearance	Previous best performance	FIFA Rankings	
Draw position	Team	Pot	Confederation	Method of qualification	Date of qualification	Finals appearance	Last appearance	Previous best performance	November 2025 (Note: The rankings of November 2025 were used for seeding for the final draw.)	June 2026
C1	Brazil	1	CONMEBOL	CONMEBOL round robin fifth place	June 10, 2025	23rd	2022	Winner (1958, 1962, 1970, 1994, 2002)	5	6
C2	Morocco	2	CAF	CAF Group E winner	September 5, 2025	7th	2022	Fourth place (2022)	11	7
C3	Haiti	4	CONCACAF	CONCACAF Group C winner	November 18, 2025	2nd	1974	Group stage (1974)	84	83
C4	Scotland	3	UEFA	UEFA Group C winner	November 18, 2025	9th	1998	Group stage (1954, 1958, 1974, 1978, 1982, 1986, 1990, 1998)	36	42

== Standings ==
Pos	Team	Pld	W	D	L	GF	GA	GD	Pts	Qualification
1	Brazil	3	2	1	0	7	1	+6	7 (Note: Tied on head-to-head result (Brazil 1–1 Morocco). Overall goal difference was used as the tiebreaker.)	Advance to knockout stage
2	Morocco	3	2	1	0	6	3	+3	7	Advance to knockout stage
3	Scotland	3	1	0	2	1	4	−3	3	
4	Haiti	3	0	0	3	2	8	−6	0	

Source: FIFA
Rules for classification: Group stage tiebreakers
Notes:

In the round of 32:

- The winner of Group C, Brazil, advanced to play the runner-up of Group F, Japan.
- The runner-up of Group C, Morocco, advanced to play the winner of Group F, the Netherlands.

== Matches ==
All times listed are local, UTC−4 (EDT).

=== Brazil vs Morocco ===
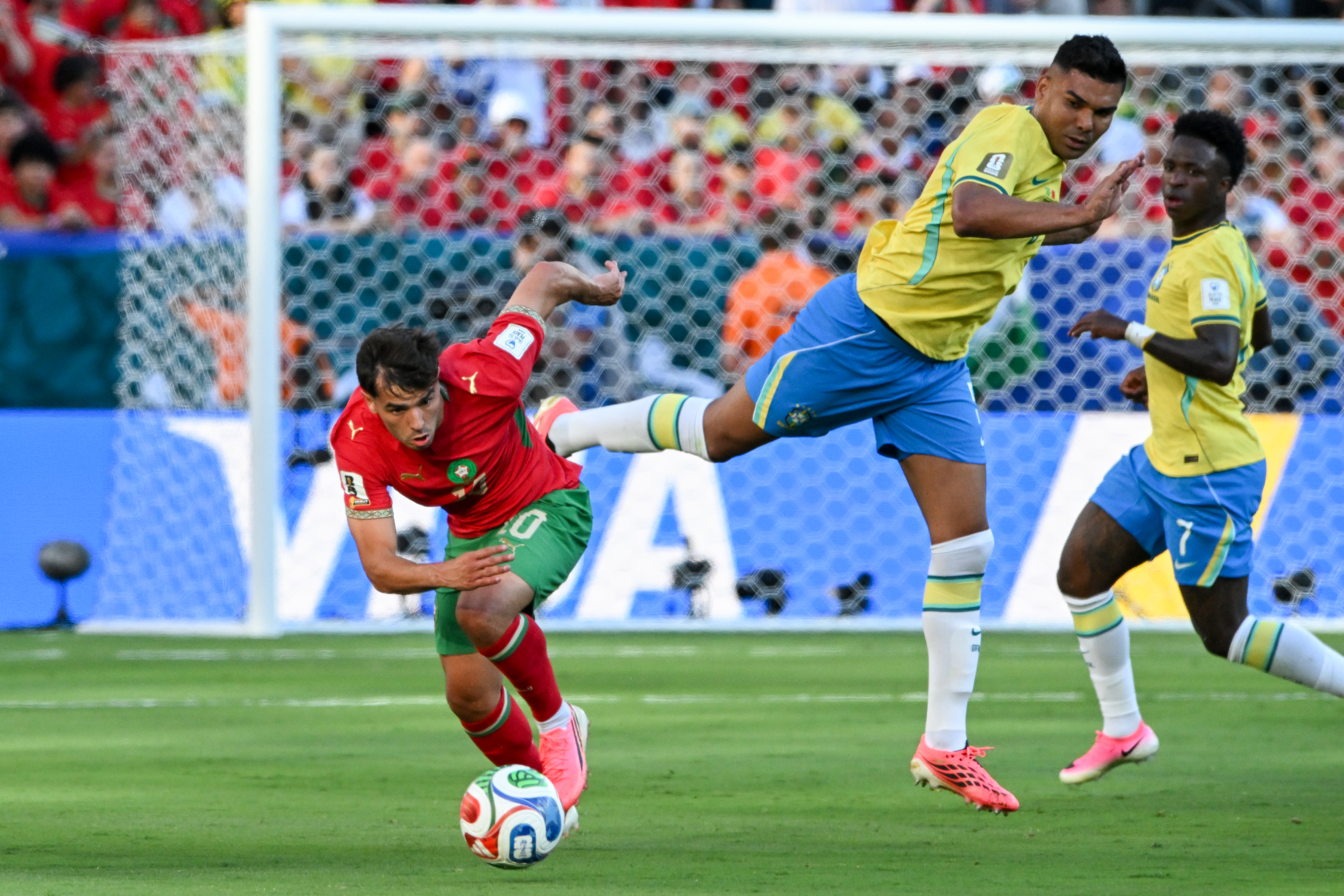
During the match between Brazil and Morocco

The teams had met three times previously, including once in the World Cup, a 3–0 group stage victory for Brazil in 1998, and most recently in 2023, a 2–1 win for Morocco (their first) in a friendly.

Morocco made a fast start in the match, with Neil El Aynaoui having an effort blocked away by Bruno Guimarães after Noussair Mazraoui had dribbled past Roger Ibañez. Morocco's early pressure was rewarded as they took the lead in the 21st minute after Brahim Díaz managed to play a through ball to Ismael Saibari, who then lobbed the ball over Alisson and into the back of the net. The Moroccans did not cease their pressure immediately following the goal, with Achraf Hakimi having two efforts slice off target with Brazil struggling to get a foothold on the game.

Despite Morocco registering 12 shots by the 30th minute, Brazil managed to strike back in the 32nd after Vinícius Júnior received the ball inside the Morocco penalty area before cutting inside and striking a right-footed effort into the corner of the net to make it 1–1. Both sides had promising chances to win the game in the second half, including from Danilo Santos for Brazil and Ayoube Amaimouni for Morocco, however the match ultimately ended in a draw.

June 13, 2026
6:00 p.m.

Brazil	1–1	Morocco
Vinícius 32'	(Note: "Brazil vs Morocco | First Stage | FIFA World Cup 2026". FIFA. Retrieved June 13, 2026.; "Match Report – Group C – Brazil v. Morocco". FIFA. June 14, 2026. Retrieved June 14, 2026.; "Post match summary report – Group C – Brazil v. Morocco". FIFA. June 14, 2026. Retrieved June 14, 2026.)	Saibari 21'

MetLife Stadium, East Rutherford
Attendance: 80,663
Referee: Slavko Vinčić (Slovenia)

Brazil	Morocco

GK	1	Alisson
RB	24	Roger Ibañez	(yellow card) 43'	(substituted off) 46'
CB	4	Marquinhos (c)
CB	3	Gabriel Magalhães
LB	16	Douglas Santos
RM	20	Lucas Paquetá		(substituted off) 61'
CM	5	Casemiro	(yellow card) 37'	(substituted off) 46'
CM	8	Bruno Guimarães		(substituted off) 80'
LM	7	Vinícius Júnior
CF	25	Igor Thiago		(substituted off) 61'
CF	11	Raphinha
Substitutions:
DF	13	Danilo Luiz		(substituted on) 46'
MF	17	Fabinho		(substituted on) 46'
FW	21	Luiz Henrique		(substituted on) 61'
FW	9	Matheus Cunha		(substituted on) 61'
MF	18	Danilo Santos		(substituted on) 80'
Manager:
(Italy) Carlo Ancelotti

GK	1	Yassine Bounou
RB	2	Achraf Hakimi (c)
CB	14	Issa Diop
CB	18	Chadi Riad
LB	3	Noussair Mazraoui	(substituted off) 80'
CM	24	Neil El Aynaoui
CM	6	Ayyoub Bouaddi
RW	10	Brahim Díaz	(substituted off) 64'
AM	8	Azzedine Ounahi	(substituted off) 64'
LW	23	Bilal El Khannouss	(substituted off) 80'
CF	11	Ismael Saibari	(substituted off) 89'
Substitutions:
MF	15	Samir El Mourabet	(substituted on) 64'
MF	7	Chemsdine Talbi	(substituted on) 64'
FW	21	Ayoube Amaimouni	(substituted on) 80'
DF	26	Anass Salah-Eddine	(substituted on) 80'
FW	9	Soufiane Rahimi	(substituted on) 89'
Manager:
Mohamed Ouahbi

Man of the Match:
Vinícius Júnior (Brazil)

Assistant referees:
Tomaž Klančnik (Slovenia)
Andraž Kovačič (Slovenia)
Fourth official:
Sandro Schärer (Switzerland)
Reserve assistant referee:
Stéphane De Almeida (Switzerland)
Video assistant referee:
Bastian Dankert (Germany)
Assistant video assistant referee:
Willy Delajod (France)
Support video assistant referee:
Ivan Bebek (Croatia)

=== Haiti vs Scotland ===
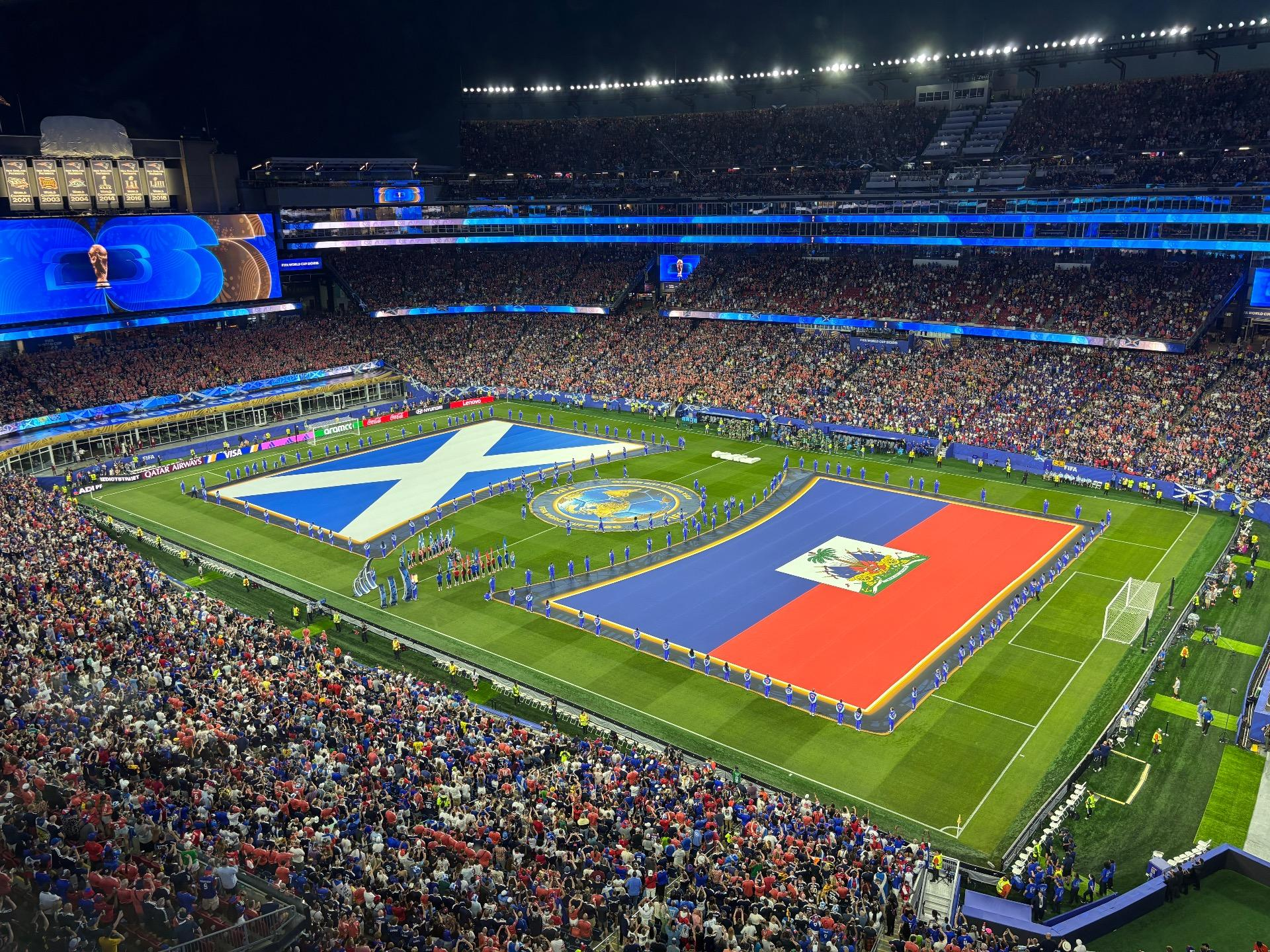
Pre-match ceremony between Haiti and Scotland

The two teams had never met before.

After both sides had previously managed to create promising opportunities in their opponents halves, Scott McTominay struck the post in the 16th minute for Scotland after being set up by Ben Gannon-Doak. In the 28th minute, the Scots went ahead after Ché Adams had a close range effort saved by Johny Placide before John McGinn managed to score the rebound with a scuffed effort that deflected into the net. McGinn had the chance to double the lead in the second half, but dragged his effort wide. Haiti pushed for an equaliser, with Ruben Providence playing an intriguing ball into the Scotland penalty area which Wilson Isidor could not quite latch on to. Despite renewed late pressure from the Haitians, including Frantzdy Pierrot having a header go wide to the left, Scotland went on to win 1–0.

The match marked the first time Scotland won a World Cup match since 1990, when the team defeated Sweden 2–1.

June 13, 2026
9:00 p.m.

Haiti	0–1	Scotland
	(Note: "Haiti vs Scotland | First Stage | FIFA World Cup 2026". FIFA. Retrieved June 13, 2026.; "Match Report – Group C – Haiti v. Scotland". FIFA. June 14, 2026. Retrieved June 14, 2026.; "Post match summary report – Group C – Haiti v. Scotland". FIFA. June 14, 2026. Retrieved June 14, 2026.)	McGinn 28'

Gillette Stadium, Foxborough
Attendance: 64,146
Referee: Mustapha Ghorbal (Algeria)

Haiti	Scotland

GK	1	Johny Placide (c)
RB	2	Carlens Arcus
CB	4	Ricardo Adé
CB	5	Hannes Delcroix
LB	8	Martin Expérience
RM	11	Louicius Deedson		(substituted off) 61'
CM	17	Danley Jean Jacques
CM	10	Jean-Ricner Bellegarde	(yellow card) 39'
LM	15	Ruben Providence		(substituted off) 85'
CF	20	Frantzdy Pierrot
CF	18	Wilson Isidor		(substituted off) 75'
Substitutions:
FW	21	Josué Casimir		(substituted on) 61'
FW	16	Lenny Joseph		(substituted on) 75'
FW	19	Yassin Fortuné		(substituted on) 85'
Manager:
(France) Sébastien Migné

GK	1	Angus Gunn
RB	2	Aaron Hickey	(yellow card) 46'	(substituted off) 75'
CB	5	Grant Hanley
CB	13	Jack Hendry
LB	3	Andy Robertson (c)
RM	17	Ben Gannon-Doak		(substituted off) 75'
CM	4	Scott McTominay
CM	19	Lewis Ferguson
LM	7	John McGinn		(substituted off) 82'
CF	20	Lawrence Shankland		(substituted off) 82'
CF	10	Ché Adams		(substituted off) 75'
Substitutions:
DF	22	Nathan Patterson		(substituted on) 75'
MF	11	Ryan Christie		(substituted on) 75'
FW	9	Lyndon Dykes		(substituted on) 75'
MF	23	Kenny McLean	(yellow card) 90+5'	(substituted on) 82'
FW	25	Findlay Curtis	(yellow card) 90+1'	(substituted on) 82'
Manager:
Steve Clarke

Man of the Match:
John McGinn (Scotland)

Assistant referees:
Mokrane Gourari (Algeria)
Abbes Akram Zerhouni (Algeria)
Fourth official:
Alejandro Hernández Hernández (Spain)
Reserve assistant referee:
José Enrique Naranjo Pérez (Spain)
Video assistant referee:
Abdullah Al-Shehri (Saudi Arabia)
Assistant video assistant referee:
Mohammed Obaid Khadim (United Arab Emirates)
Support video assistant referee:
Fedayi San (Switzerland)

=== Scotland vs Morocco ===
The teams' only meeting took place in their final group stage match at the 1998 FIFA World Cup, as Morocco won 3–0.

Morocco took the lead in just the second minute of the game, after Brahim Díaz played a ball over the top of Scotland's defence and into the path of Ismael Saibari, who struck the ball into the left-hand corner of the net from the right to score for the second straight game. Morocco came forward with a similar looking attack in the 18th minute, with Díaz playing another ball over the top which Achraf Hakimi tried to collect, but Angus Gunn was able to block Hakimi from touching the ball into the net. Morocco continued to push for another goal with Neil El Aynaoui and Bilal El Khannouss both having efforts fly over the bar in the 30th and 36th minutes respectively.

Early in the second half, Scotland players protested for a penalty following an alleged foul by El Aynaoui on John McGinn inside the penalty area, however no penalty was forthcoming. Morocco pushed forward again through El Khannouss, who squared the ball across to Saibari whose deflected effort struck the crossbar. Scotland continued to push for an equaliser, and in the 82nd minute, they protested for a penalty again after Scott McTominay went down inside the penalty area following a tackle from El Aynaoui. Again, no penalty was ultimately awarded. Morocco came close to scoring a second goal in the last minutes of the match, with Chemsdine Talbi having an effort tipped over by Gunn and Ayoube Amaimouni having his shot go just wide.

June 19, 2026
6:00 p.m.

Scotland	0–1	Morocco
	(Note: "Scotland vs Morocco | First Stage | FIFA World Cup 2026". FIFA. Retrieved June 19, 2026.; "Match Report – Group C – Scotland v. Morocco". FIFA. June 20, 2026. Retrieved June 20, 2026.; "Post match summary report – Group C – Scotland v. Morocco". FIFA. June 19, 2026. Retrieved June 20, 2026.)	Saibari 2'

Gillette Stadium, Foxborough
Attendance: 64,146
Referee: Ilgiz Tantashev (Uzbekistan)

Scotland	Morocco

GK	1	Angus Gunn
RB	22	Nathan Patterson		(substituted off) 89'
CB	5	Grant Hanley
CB	13	Jack Hendry
LB	3	Andy Robertson (c)	(yellow card) 65'
RM	7	John McGinn		(substituted off) 89'
CM	19	Lewis Ferguson
CM	11	Ryan Christie		(substituted off) 72'
LM	6	Kieran Tierney		(substituted off) 60'
CF	4	Scott McTominay
CF	10	Ché Adams		(substituted off) 71'
Substitutions:
FW	17	Ben Gannon-Doak		(substituted on) 60'
FW	9	Lyndon Dykes		(substituted on) 71'
MF	23	Kenny McLean		(substituted on) 72'
FW	14	Ross Stewart		(substituted on) 89'
DF	24	Anthony Ralston		(substituted on) 89'
Manager:
Steve Clarke

GK	1	Yassine Bounou
RB	2	Achraf Hakimi (c)
CB	14	Issa Diop	(yellow card) 23'
CB	18	Chadi Riad
LB	3	Noussair Mazraoui
CM	24	Neil El Aynaoui
CM	6	Ayyoub Bouaddi
RW	10	Brahim Díaz		(substituted off) 84'
AM	8	Azzedine Ounahi		(substituted off) 90'
LW	23	Bilal El Khannouss		(substituted off) 84'
CF	11	Ismael Saibari		(substituted off) 84'
Substitutions:
FW	9	Soufiane Rahimi		(substituted on) 84'
FW	21	Ayoube Amaimouni		(substituted on) 84'
MF	7	Chemsdine Talbi		(substituted on) 84'
MF	15	Samir El Mourabet		(substituted on) 90'
Manager:
Mohamed Ouahbi

Man of the Match:
Ismael Saibari (Morocco)

Assistant referees:
Andrey Tsapenko (Uzbekistan)
Timur Gaynullin (Uzbekistan)
Fourth official:
Adham Makhadmeh (Jordan)
Reserve assistant referee:
Mohammad Al-Kalaf (Jordan)
Video assistant referee:
Armando Villarreal (United States)
Assistant video assistant referee:
Erick Miranda (Mexico)
Support video assistant referee:
Hernán Mastrángelo (Argentina)

=== Brazil vs Haiti ===
The teams had met thrice previously, most recently in 2016, a 7–1 win for Brazil in the group stage of the Copa América Centenario in 2016.

Brazil took control of the wide areas of the game early on through Raphinha and Vinícius Júnior, and they thought they had took the lead in the 11th minute after Raphinha struck the ball into the net after being played into a one-on-one situation by Bruno Guimarães, but the goal was disallowed for offside. Brazil did get the breakthrough 12 minutes later after Vinícius had an effort saved by Johny Placide before Matheus Cunha followed up with the rebound from close range. This lead was then doubled in the 36th minute, with Vinícius playing a through ball to Cunha, who managed to strike his left-footed effort into the top corner of the net. Vinícius scored Brazil's third in the final stages of the first half, after running on a ball played over the top from Lucas Paquetá before slotting the ball through Placide and into the net.

With this result, Haiti became the first team eliminated from the tournament after losing two consecutive matches.

June 19, 2026
8:30 p.m.

Brazil	3–0	Haiti
Cunha 23', 36'; Vinícius 45+3'	(Note: "Brazil vs Haiti | First Stage | FIFA World Cup 2026". FIFA. Retrieved June 20, 2026.; "Match Report – Group C – Brazil v. Haiti". FIFA. June 20, 2026. Retrieved June 20, 2026.; "Post match summary report – Group C – Brazil v. Haiti". FIFA. June 19, 2026. Retrieved June 20, 2026.)

Lincoln Financial Field, Philadelphia
Attendance: 68,324
Referee: Alejandro Hernández Hernández (Spain)

Brazil	Haiti

GK	1	Alisson
RB	13	Danilo Luiz
CB	4	Marquinhos (c)
CB	3	Gabriel Magalhães
LB	16	Douglas Santos	(yellow card) 65'
CM	8	Bruno Guimarães		(substituted off) 81'
CM	5	Casemiro
CM	20	Lucas Paquetá		(substituted off) 64'
RF	7	Vinícius Júnior		(substituted off) 81'
CF	9	Matheus Cunha		(substituted off) 64'
LF	11	Raphinha		(substituted off) 40'
Substitutions:
FW	26	Rayan		(substituted on) 40'
FW	22	Gabriel Martinelli		(substituted on) 64'
FW	19	Endrick		(substituted on) 64'
MF	18	Danilo Santos		(substituted on) 81'
MF	2	Éderson Silva		(substituted on) 81'
Manager:
(Italy) Carlo Ancelotti

GK	1	Johny Placide (c)
CB	22	Jean-Kévin Duverne
CB	4	Ricardo Adé
CB	5	Hannes Delcroix
RWB	2	Carlens Arcus	(yellow card) 4'	(substituted off) 46'
LWB	8	Martin Expérience
RM	21	Josué Casimir		(substituted off) 63'
CM	17	Danley Jean Jacques	(yellow card) 72'
CM	10	Jean-Ricner Bellegarde		(substituted off) 81'
LM	15	Ruben Providence		(substituted off) 71'
CF	20	Frantzdy Pierrot	(yellow card) 45+4'	(substituted off) 46'
Substitutions:
MF	25	Dominique Simon		(substituted on) 46'
FW	18	Wilson Isidor		(substituted on) 46'
FW	11	Louicius Deedson		(substituted on) 63'
FW	16	Lenny Joseph		(substituted on) 71'
FW	7	Derrick Etienne Jr.		(substituted on) 81'
Manager:
(France) Sébastien Migné

Man of the Match:
Vinícius Júnior (Brazil)

Assistant referees:
José Enrique Naranjo Pérez (Spain)
Diego Sánchez Rojo (Spain)
Fourth official:
Sandro Schärer (Switzerland)
Reserve assistant referee:
Stéphane De Almeida (Switzerland)
Video assistant referee:
Carlos del Cerro Grande (Spain)
Assistant video assistant referee:
Willy Delajod (France)
Support video assistant referee:
Mahmoud Ashour (Egypt)

=== Scotland vs Brazil ===
The teams had faced each other in ten previous matches including at the FIFA World Cup on four previous occasions, all of them in the first round. Their first meeting was a 0–0 draw at the 1974 FIFA World Cup and then Brazil won the next three group stage encounters: 4–1 in 1982, 1–0 in 1990, and a 2–1 victory in the 1998 FIFA World Cup opening match. Their latest match took place in 2011, as Brazil won a 2–0 friendly to keep their unbeaten head-to-head record.

Ultimately, Scotland were eliminated from the group stage after missing out on the top eight of third-place teams.

June 24, 2026
6:00 p.m.

Scotland	0–3	Brazil
	(Note: "Scotland vs Brazil | First Stage | FIFA World Cup 2026". FIFA. Retrieved June 25, 2026.; "Match Report – Group C – Scotland v. Brazil". FIFA. June 25, 2026. Retrieved June 25, 2026.; "Post match summary report – Group C – Scotland v. Brazil". FIFA. June 25, 2026. Retrieved June 25, 2026.)	Vinícius 7', 45+3'; Cunha 60'

Hard Rock Stadium, Miami Gardens
Attendance: 64,478
Referee: César Arturo Ramos (Mexico)

Scotland	Brazil

GK	1	Angus Gunn
RB	22	Nathan Patterson		(substituted off) 81'
CB	26	Scott McKenna
CB	13	Jack Hendry
LB	3	Andy Robertson (c)		(substituted off) 46'
CM	19	Lewis Ferguson
CM	7	John McGinn		(substituted off) 90+1'
RW	17	Ben Gannon-Doak		(substituted off) 81'
AM	4	Scott McTominay
LW	23	Kenny McLean
CF	20	Lawrence Shankland		(substituted off) 90+1'
Substitutions:
DF	6	Kieran Tierney		(substituted on) 46'
DF	24	Anthony Ralston		(substituted on) 81'
MF	11	Ryan Christie	(yellow card) 89'	(substituted on) 81'
MF	25	Findlay Curtis		(substituted on) 90+1'
FW	10	Ché Adams		(substituted on) 90+1'
Manager:
Steve Clarke

GK	1	Alisson
RB	13	Danilo Luiz	(yellow card) 62'
CB	4	Marquinhos (c)
CB	3	Gabriel Magalhães
LB	16	Douglas Santos		(substituted off) 82'
CM	8	Bruno Guimarães
CM	5	Casemiro		(substituted off) 66'
CM	20	Lucas Paquetá		(substituted off) 66'
RF	26	Rayan		(substituted off) 82'
CF	9	Matheus Cunha		(substituted off) 76'
LF	7	Vinícius Júnior
Substitutions:
MF	17	Fabinho	(yellow card) 82'	(substituted on) 66'
FW	22	Gabriel Martinelli		(substituted on) 66'
FW	10	Neymar		(substituted on) 76'
FW	19	Endrick		(substituted on) 82'
DF	6	Alex Sandro		(substituted on) 82'
Manager:
(Italy) Carlo Ancelotti

Man of the Match:
Vinícius Júnior (Brazil)

Assistant referees:
Alberto Morín (Mexico)
Marco Bisguerra (Mexico)
Fourth official:
Espen Eskås (Norway)
Reserve assistant referee:
Jan Erik Engan (Norway)
Video assistant referee:
Guillermo Pacheco (Mexico)
Assistant video assistant referee:
Abdullah Al-Shehri (Saudi Arabia)
Support video assistant referee:
Tomasz Kwiatkowski (Poland)

=== Morocco vs Haiti ===
The two teams had never met before.

Morocco dominated through the match against the inexperienced Haitian team that were already eliminated, though Yassine Bounou made a costly own goal in the 10-minute first half. The Moroccan team bounced back and scored four goals throughout, with Haiti's Wilson Isidor scoring a goal though it was not enough as it concluded with their 4–2 defeat.

With three additional defeats, Haiti has six overall losses from their two World Cup appearances, remaining winless in their 52-year return.

June 24, 2026
6:00 p.m.

Morocco	4–2	Haiti
Hakimi 39'; Saibari 45+1'; Rahimi 78'; Yassine 89'	(Note: "Morocco vs Haiti | First Stage | FIFA World Cup 2026". FIFA. Retrieved June 25, 2026.; "Match Report – Group C – Morocco v. Haiti". FIFA. June 25, 2026. Retrieved June 25, 2026.; "Post match summary report – Group C – Morocco v. Haiti". FIFA. June 25, 2026. Retrieved June 25, 2026.)	Bounou 10' (o.g.); Isidor 43'

Mercedes-Benz Stadium, Atlanta
Attendance: 68,239
Referee: Danny Makkelie (Netherlands)

Morocco	Haiti

GK	1	Yassine Bounou
RB	2	Achraf Hakimi (c)
CB	25	Redouane Halhal
CB	18	Chadi Riad
LB	26	Anass Salah-Eddine	(substituted off) 83'
CM	4	Sofyan Amrabat
CM	24	Neil El Aynaoui	(substituted off) 83'
RW	10	Brahim Díaz	(substituted off) 70'
AM	11	Ismael Saibari	(substituted off) 70'
LW	23	Bilal El Khannouss
CF	20	Ayoub El Kaabi	(substituted off) 70'
Substitutions:
FW	9	Soufiane Rahimi	(substituted on) 70'
MF	8	Azzedine Ounahi	(substituted on) 70'
MF	16	Gessime Yassine	(substituted on) 70'
MF	15	Samir El Mourabet	(substituted on) 83'
DF	3	Noussair Mazraoui	(substituted on) 83'
Manager:
Mohamed Ouahbi

GK	1	Johny Placide (c)	(yellow card) 79'
RB	22	Jean-Kévin Duverne		(substituted off) 80'
CB	4	Ricardo Adé
CB	5	Hannes Delcroix
LB	8	Martin Expérience
RM	21	Josué Casimir	(yellow card) 90+3'
CM	17	Danley Jean Jacques		(substituted off) 80'
CM	10	Jean-Ricner Bellegarde
LM	15	Ruben Providence		(substituted off) 67'
CF	18	Wilson Isidor		(substituted off) 67'
CF	16	Lenny Joseph		(substituted off) 83'
Substitutions:
FW	9	Duckens Nazon	(yellow card) 80'	(substituted on) 67'
FW	11	Louicius Deedson		(substituted on) 67'
DF	2	Carlens Arcus		(substituted on) 80'
MF	25	Dominique Simon		(substituted on) 80'
FW	20	Frantzdy Pierrot		(substituted on) 83'
Manager:
(France) Sébastien Migné

Man of the Match:
Achraf Hakimi (Morocco)

Assistant referees:
Hessel Steegstra (Netherlands)
Jan de Vries (Netherlands)
Fourth official:
João Pinheiro (Portugal)
Reserve assistant referee:
Bruno Jesus (Portugal)
Video assistant referee:
Dennis Higler (Netherlands)
Assistant video assistant referee:
Fedayi San (Switzerland)
Support video assistant referee:
Bram Van Driessche (Belgium)

== Discipline ==
The team conduct ("fair play") score would have been used as a tiebreaker if the head-to-head and overall records of teams were tied. It would also be used as a tiebreaker for the third-place ranking between groups if the overall records of teams were tied. The score was calculated based on yellow and red cards received by players and team officials in all group matches as follows:

- yellow card: −1 point;
- indirect red card (second yellow card): −3 points;
- direct red card: −4 points;
- yellow card and direct red card: −5 points;

Only one of the above deductions could be applied to a player or team official in a single match.

Team	Match 1				Match 2				Match 3				Score
Team	Booked	(yellow card) (yellow-red card)	Sent off (straight red)	(yellow card) (red card)	Booked	(yellow card) (yellow-red card)	Sent off (straight red)	(yellow card) (red card)	Booked	(yellow card) (yellow-red card)	Sent off (straight red)	(yellow card) (red card)	Score
Morocco					1								−1
Brazil	2				1				2				−5
Scotland	3				1				1				−5
Haiti	1				3				3				−7
