= 2025 CONCACAF Gold Cup Group D =

Football competition

Group D of the 2025 CONCACAF Gold Cup consisted of United States, Haiti, Trinidad and Tobago, and Saudi Arabia. Teams in this group played from June 15 to 22, 2025. The top two teams, United States and Saudi Arabia, advanced to the quarter-finals.

== Standings ==
Pos	Team	Pld	W	D	L	GF	GA	GD	Pts	Qualification
1	United States (H)	3	3	0	0	8	1	+7	9	Advance to knockout stage
2	Saudi Arabia	3	1	1	1	2	2	0	4	Advance to knockout stage
3	Trinidad and Tobago	3	0	2	1	2	7	−5	2	
4	Haiti	3	0	1	2	2	4	−2	1	

Source: CONCACAF
Rules for classification: Tiebreakers
(H) Co-host

In the quarter-finals:

- The winners of Group D, the United States, advanced to play the runners-up of Group A, Costa Rica.
- The runners-up of Group D, Saudi Arabia, advanced to play the winners of Group A, Mexico.

== Matches ==
=== United States vs Trinidad and Tobago ===
June 15, 2025
18:00 (15:00 UTC−7)

United States	5–0	Trinidad and Tobago
Tillman 16', 41'; Agyemang 44'; B. Aaronson 82'; Wright 84'	Report

PayPal Park, San Jose
Attendance: 12,610
Referee: Adonai Escobedo (Mexico)

United States	Trinidad and Tobago

GK	25	Matt Freese
RB	16	Alex Freeman
CB	3	Chris Richards	(substituted off) 87'
CB	13	Tim Ream (c)
LB	18	Maximilian Arfsten
CM	8	Sebastian Berhalter
CM	14	Luca de la Torre	(substituted off) 83'
RW	6	Jack McGlynn	(substituted off) 74'
AM	17	Malik Tillman
LW	10	Diego Luna	(substituted off) 74'
CF	24	Patrick Agyemang	(substituted off) 73'
Substitutions:
FW	19	Haji Wright	(substituted on) 73'
MF	11	Brenden Aaronson	(substituted on) 74'
DF	22	Mark McKenzie	(substituted on) 74'
FW	21	Paxten Aaronson	(substituted on) 83'
DF	12	Miles Robinson	(substituted on) 87'
Manager:
(Argentina) Mauricio Pochettino

GK	1	Marvin Phillip
CB	16	Alvin Jones		(substituted off) 46'
CB	4	Sheldon Bateau
CB	5	Justin Garcia	(yellow card) 34'
RWB	24	Isaiah Garcia		(substituted off) 62'
LWB	13	Tyrese Spicer
CM	19	Ajani Fortune
CM	23	Noah Powder		(substituted off) 46'
CM	8	Daniel Phillips
CF	10	Kevin Molino (c)		(substituted off) 74'
CF	26	Isaiah Lee		(substituted off) 46'
Substitutions:
DF	6	Andre Raymond		(substituted on) 46'
MF	9	Nathaniel James		(substituted on) 46'
FW	15	Dante Sealy		(substituted on) 46'
DF	17	Rio Cardines		(substituted on) 62'
DF	3	Joevin Jones		(substituted on) 74'
Manager:
Dwight Yorke

Player of the Match:
Malik Tillman (United States)

Assistant referees:
Michel Espinoza (Mexico)
Leonardo Castillo (Mexico)
Fourth official:
Pierre-Luc Lauzière (Canada)
Video assistant referee:
Óscar Macías (Mexico)
Assistant video assistant referee:
Dilia Bradley (Guatemala)

=== Haiti vs Saudi Arabia ===
June 15, 2025
20:15 (17:15 UTC−7)

Haiti	0–1	Saudi Arabia
	Report	Al-Shehri 21' (pen.)

Snapdragon Stadium, San Diego
Attendance: 7,736
Referee: Walter López (Guatemala)

Haiti	Saudi Arabia

GK	1	Johny Placide (c)
RB	2	Carlens Arcus
CB	4	Ricardo Adé
CB	22	Jean-Kévin Duverne	(yellow card) 89'
LB	8	Martin Expérience
DM	14	Leverton Pierre	(yellow card) 17'	(substituted off) 84'
RM	10	Louicius Deedson		(substituted off) 62'
CM	21	Christopher Attys		(substituted off) 84'
CM	17	Danley Jean Jacques
LM	9	Duckens Nazon		(substituted off) 74'
CF	20	Frantzdy Pierrot	(yellow card) 50'
Substitutions:
FW	18	Ruben Providence		(substituted on) 62'
MF	11	Dany Jean	(yellow card) 90+3'	(substituted on) 74'
MF	5	Carl Fred Sainté		(substituted on) 84'
FW	16	Mondy Prunier		(substituted on) 84'
Manager:
(France) Sébastien Migné

GK	1	Nawaf Al-Aqidi
RB	12	Saud Abdulhamid
CB	4	Abdulelah Al-Amri
CB	14	Hassan Kadesh (c)		(substituted off) 32'
LB	13	Nawaf Boushal
CM	6	Ali Al-Hassan
CM	10	Faisal Al-Ghamdi		(substituted off) 46'
RW	25	Hammam Al-Hammami		(substituted off) 46'
AM	16	Ziyad Al-Johani
LW	8	Marwan Al-Sahafi		(substituted off) 83'
CF	11	Saleh Al-Shehri		(substituted off) 62'
Substitutions:
DF	5	Abdullah Madu	(yellow card) 52'	(substituted on) 32'
MF	15	Ayman Yahya		(substituted on) 46'
FW	24	Abdulrahman Al-Aboud		(substituted on) 46'
FW	9	Firas Al-Buraikan		(substituted on) 62'
MF	19	Turki Al-Ammar		(substituted on) 83'
Manager:
(France) Hervé Renard

Player of the Match:
Saleh Al-Shehri (Saudi Arabia)

Assistant referees:
Keytzel Corrales (Nicaragua)
Raymundo Feliz (Dominican Republic)
Fourth official:
Julio Luna (Guatemala)
Video assistant referee:
Diego Ojer (Guatemala)
Assistant video assistant referee:
Yasith Monge (Costa Rica)

=== Trinidad and Tobago vs Haiti ===
June 19, 2025
18:45 (17:45 UTC−5)

Trinidad and Tobago	1–1	Haiti
J. Garcia 68'	Report	Pierrot 49'

Shell Energy Stadium, Houston
Attendance: 2,409
Referee: Ismael Cornejo (El Salvador)

Trinidad and Tobago	Haiti

GK	1	Marvin Phillip
RB	17	Rio Cardines
CB	4	Sheldon Bateau
CB	5	Justin Garcia
LB	6	Andre Raymond
RM	15	Dante Sealy		(substituted off) 56'
CM	18	Andre Rampersad	(yellow card) 72'
CM	8	Daniel Phillips		(substituted off) 56'
LM	13	Tyrese Spicer		(substituted off) 87'
CF	11	Levi García (c)		(substituted off) 89'
CF	9	Nathaniel James		(substituted off) 56'
Substitutions:
FW	10	Kevin Molino		(substituted on) 56'
MF	20	Real Gill		(substituted on) 56'
MF	7	Steffen Yeates		(substituted on) 56'
DF	25	Kaihim Thomas		(substituted on) 87'
FW	12	Isaiah Leacock		(substituted on) 89'
Manager:
Dwight Yorke

GK	1	Johny Placide (c)
RB	2	Carlens Arcus		(substituted off) 70'
CB	4	Ricardo Adé
CB	22	Jean-Kévin Duverne	(red card) 39'
LB	8	Martin Expérience
RM	10	Louicius Deedson		(substituted off) 81'
CM	14	Leverton Pierre
CM	17	Danley Jean Jacques	(yellow card) 72'
LM	18	Ruben Providence		(substituted off) 71'
CF	9	Duckens Nazon		(substituted off) 42'
CF	20	Frantzdy Pierrot		(substituted off) 81'
Substitutions:
DF	6	Garven Metusala	(yellow card) 90+2'	(substituted on) 42'
DF	24	Wilguens Paugain		(substituted on) 70'
MF	21	Christopher Attys		(substituted on) 71'
FW	16	Mondy Prunier		(substituted on) 81'
MF	11	Dany Jean		(substituted on) 81'
Manager:
(France) Sébastien Migné

Player of the Match:
Justin Garcia (Trinidad and Tobago)

Assistant referees:
Geovany García (El Salvador)
Juan Zumba (El Salvador)
Fourth official:
Adonis Carrasco (Dominican Republic)
Video assistant referee:
Yasith Monge (Costa Rica)
Assistant video assistant referee:
Jesús Montero (Costa Rica)

=== Saudi Arabia vs United States ===
June 19, 2025
21:15 (20:15 UTC−5)

Saudi Arabia	0–1	United States
	Report	Richards 63'

Q2 Stadium, Austin
Attendance: 11,727
Referee: Marco Ortíz (Mexico)

Saudi Arabia	United States

GK	1	Nawaf Al-Aqidi
RB	26	Ali Majrashi
CB	4	Abdulelah Al-Amri (c)
CB	5	Abdullah Madu
LB	13	Nawaf Boushal		(substituted off) 75'
DM	6	Ali Al-Hassan		(substituted off) 58'
CM	12	Saud Abdulhamid
CM	16	Ziyad Al-Johani
RF	24	Abdulrahman Al-Aboud	(yellow card) 89'
CF	9	Firas Al-Buraikan		(substituted off) 85'
LF	15	Ayman Yahya		(substituted off) 57'
Substitutions:
FW	11	Saleh Al-Shehri		(substituted on) 57'
MF	7	Mukhtar Ali		(substituted on) 58'
MF	8	Marwan Al-Sahafi		(substituted on) 75'
FW	20	Abdullah Al-Salem		(substituted on) 85'
Manager:
(France) Hervé Renard

GK	25	Matt Freese
RB	16	Alex Freeman		(substituted off) 88'
CB	3	Chris Richards
CB	13	Tim Ream (c)
LB	18	Maximilian Arfsten
CM	8	Sebastian Berhalter	(yellow card) 90'
CM	14	Luca de la Torre		(substituted off) 62'
RW	6	Jack McGlynn		(substituted off) 62'
AM	10	Diego Luna	(yellow card) 67'	(substituted off) 76'
LW	17	Malik Tillman
CF	24	Patrick Agyemang		(substituted off) 88'
Substitutions:
MF	4	Tyler Adams		(substituted on) 62'
FW	9	Damion Downs		(substituted on) 62'
MF	11	Brenden Aaronson		(substituted on) 76'
DF	12	Miles Robinson		(substituted on) 88'
MF	15	Johnny Cardoso		(substituted on) 88'
Manager:
(Argentina) Mauricio Pochettino

Player of the Match:
Chris Richards (United States)

Assistant referees:
Michel Morales (Mexico)
Jorge Sánchez (Mexico)
Fourth official:
Bryan López (Guatemala)
Video assistant referee:
Óscar Mejía (Mexico)
Assistant video assistant referee:
Benjamín Pineda (Costa Rica)

=== Saudi Arabia vs Trinidad and Tobago ===
June 22, 2025
19:00 (16:00 UTC−7)

Saudi Arabia	1–1	Trinidad and Tobago
Al-Buraikan 60'	Report	Sealy 10'

Allegiant Stadium, Paradise
Attendance: 35,000
Referee: Keylor Herrera (Costa Rica)

Saudi Arabia	Trinidad and Tobago

GK	1	Nawaf Al-Aqidi
RB	26	Ali Majrashi	(yellow card) 75'
CB	4	Abdulelah Al-Amri
CB	5	Abdullah Madu
LB	12	Saud Abdulhamid
DM	7	Mukhtar Ali		(substituted off) 46'
CM	16	Ziyad Al-Johani
CM	15	Ayman Yahya		(substituted off) 46'
RF	9	Firas Al-Buraikan
CF	11	Saleh Al-Shehri (c)		(substituted off) 80'
LF	24	Abdulrahman Al-Aboud		(substituted off) 80'
Substitutions:
MF	19	Turki Al-Ammar		(substituted on) 46'
MF	6	Ali Al-Hassan		(substituted on) 46'
MF	8	Marwan Al-Sahafi		(substituted on) 80'
DF	13	Nawaf Boushal		(substituted on) 80'
Manager:
(France) Hervé Renard

GK	1	Marvin Phillip
RB	17	Rio Cardines
CB	16	Alvin Jones
CB	5	Justin Garcia
LB	6	Andre Raymond
RM	15	Dante Sealy		(substituted off) 80'
CM	18	Andre Rampersad
CM	10	Kevin Molino (c)		(substituted off) 66'
CM	8	Daniel Phillips	(yellow card) 39'	(substituted off) 66'
LM	20	Real Gill		(substituted off) 71'
CF	11	Levi García
Substitutions:
MF	19	Ajani Fortune		(substituted on) 66' (substituted off) 80'
MF	7	Steffen Yeates		(substituted on) 66'
MF	9	Nathaniel James		(substituted on) 71'
DF	3	Joevin Jones		(substituted on) 80'
DF	25	Kaihim Thomas		(substituted on) 80'
Manager:
Dwight Yorke

Player of the Match:
Firas Al-Buraikan (Saudi Arabia)

Assistant referees:
William Chow (Costa Rica)
Víctor Ramírez (Costa Rica)
Fourth official:
Pierre-Luc Lauzière (Canada)
Video assistant referee:
Daneon Parchment (Jamaica)
Assistant video assistant referee:
Ben Whitty (Cayman Islands)

=== United States vs Haiti ===
June 22, 2025
19:00 (18:00 UTC−5)

United States	2–1	Haiti
Tillman 10'; Agyemang 75'	Report	Deedson 19'

AT&T Stadium, Arlington
Attendance: 20,918
Referee: Katia García (Mexico)

United States	Haiti

GK	25	Matt Freese
RB	16	Alex Freeman
CB	3	Chris Richards
CB	13	Tim Ream (c)
LB	2	John Tolkin
CM	4	Tyler Adams	(yellow card) 1'	(substituted off) 88'
CM	14	Luca de la Torre		(substituted off) 81'
RW	7	Quinn Sullivan		(substituted off) 70'
AM	17	Malik Tillman
LW	11	Brenden Aaronson		(substituted off) 70'
CF	24	Patrick Agyemang		(substituted off) 82'
Substitutions:
MF	10	Diego Luna		(substituted on) 70'
MF	6	Jack McGlynn		(substituted on) 70'
MF	15	Johnny Cardoso		(substituted on) 81'
FW	23	Brian White		(substituted on) 82'
FW	21	Paxten Aaronson		(substituted on) 88'
Manager:
(Argentina) Mauricio Pochettino

GK	1	Johny Placide (c)
RB	2	Carlens Arcus	(substituted off) 88'
CB	4	Ricardo Adé
CB	6	Garven Metusala
LB	8	Martin Expérience
RM	10	Louicius Deedson	(substituted off) 46'
CM	14	Leverton Pierre
CM	17	Danley Jean Jacques
LM	18	Ruben Providence	(substituted off) 88'
CF	20	Frantzdy Pierrot
CF	9	Duckens Nazon	(substituted off) 80'
Substitutions:
MF	21	Christopher Attys	(substituted on) 46'
MF	11	Dany Jean	(substituted on) 80'
FW	15	Mikaël Cantave	(substituted on) 88'
DF	24	Wilguens Paugain	(substituted on) 88'
Manager:
(France) Sébastien Migné

Player of the Match:
Malik Tillman (United States)

Assistant referees:
Sandra Ramírez (Mexico)
Karen Díaz (Mexico)
Fourth official:
Julio Luna (Guatemala)
Video assistant referee:
Óscar Mejía (Mexico)
Assistant video assistant referee:
Yasith Monge (Costa Rica)

== Discipline ==
Fair play points would have been used as tiebreakers should the overall and head-to-head records of teams were tied. These were calculated based on yellow and red cards received in all group matches as follows:

- first yellow card: −1 point;
- indirect red card (second yellow card): −3 points;
- direct red card: −4 points;
- yellow card and direct red card: −5 points;

Only one of the above deductions is applied to a player in a single match.

Team	Match 1				Match 2				Match 3				Points
Team	Booked	(yellow card) (yellow-red card)	Sent off (straight red)	(yellow card) (red card)	Booked	(yellow card) (yellow-red card)	Sent off (straight red)	(yellow card) (red card)	Booked	(yellow card) (yellow-red card)	Sent off (straight red)	(yellow card) (red card)	Points
United States					2				1				–3
Saudi Arabia	1				1				1				–3
Trinidad and Tobago	1				1				1				–3
Haiti	4				2		1						–10
