= Noubissie =

Noubissie is a Cameroonian surname. Notable people with the surname include:

- Patrick Noubissie (born 1983), French footballer
- Simon Laroche Nganou Noubissie (born 1994), better known as Benash, Cameroonian rapper
- Tyrese Noubissie (born 2009), French footballer

== See also ==
- Marius Noubissi (born 1996), Cameroonian footballer
