= 2025–26 RC Strasbourg Alsace season =

RC Strasbourg Alsace
2025–26 season
- Owner: BlueCo
- President: Marc Keller
- Head coach: Liam Rosenior (until 6 January); Gary O'Neil (from 7 January)
- Stadium: Stade de la Meinau
- Ligue 1: 8th
- Coupe de France: Semi-finals
- UEFA Conference League: Semi-finals
- Top goalscorer: League: Joaquín Panichelli (16); All: Joaquín Panichelli (20)
- Average home league attendance: 27,656
Home colours	Away colours	Third colours

The 2025–26 season was the 120th season in the history of RC Strasbourg Alsace, and the club's ninth consecutive season in Ligue 1. In addition to the domestic league, the club participated in the Coupe de France and UEFA Conference League.

== Season summary ==
With five wins and a draw during the league phase of the UEFA Conference League, Strasbourg finished top of the table and advanced to the round of 16.

On 6 January 2026, it was announced that fellow BlueCo owned club Chelsea had appointed Liam Rosenior as their new head coach.

== Players ==
=== First-team squad ===
As of 2 February 2026

Note: Flags indicate national team as defined under FIFA eligibility rules; some limited exceptions apply. Players may hold more than one non-FIFA nationality.

No.	Pos.	Nation	Player
1	GK	SWE	Karl-Johan Johnsson
2	DF	IRL	Andrew Omobamidele
3	DF	ENG	Ben Chilwell
5	DF	ARG	Aarón Anselmino (on loan from Chelsea)
6	DF	FRA	Ismaël Doukouré
7	FW	BEL	Diego Moreira
8	MF	POL	Maxi Oyedele
9	FW	ARG	Joaquín Panichelli
10	FW	NED	Emmanuel Emegha (captain)
11	FW	SWE	Sebastian Nanasi
15	FW	CIV	David Datro Fofana (on loan from Chelsea)
17	MF	FRA	Mathis Amougou

No.	Pos.	Nation	Player
19	MF	PAR	Julio Enciso
20	FW	CIV	Martial Godo
22	DF	CIV	Guéla Doué
24	DF	DEN	Lucas Høgsberg
27	FW	ENG	Sam Amo-Ameyaw
29	MF	MAR	Samir El Mourabet
32	MF	ARG	Valentín Barco
39	GK	BEL	Mike Penders (on loan from Chelsea)
42	FW	CIV	Abdoul Ouattara
50	GK	FRA	Stefan Bajic
80	FW	MAR	Gessime Yassine
83	MF	POR	Rafael Luís (on loan from Benfica)

=== Out on loan ===
Note: Flags indicate national team as defined under FIFA eligibility rules; some limited exceptions apply. Players may hold more than one non-FIFA nationality.

No.	Pos.	Nation	Player
—	DF	FRA	Soumaïla Coulibaly (at Brest until 30 June 2026)
—	DF	FRA	Yoni Gomis (at Beveren until 30 June 2026)
—	DF	GUI	Saïdou Sow (at Clermont until 30 June 2026)
—	DF	CIV	Abakar Sylla (at Nantes until 30 June 2026)
—	MF	SEN	Pape Diong (at Dunkerque until 30 June 2026)
—	MF	SEN	Pape Demba Diop (at Toulouse until 30 June 2026)

No.	Pos.	Nation	Player
—	MF	FRA	Rabby Nzingoula (at 1. FC Nürnberg until 30 June 2026)
—	FW	SRB	Miloš Luković (at Preston North End until 30 June 2026)
—	FW	FRA	Sékou Mara (at Auxerre until 30 June 2026)
—	FW	FRA	Rayane Messi (at Neom until 30 June 2026)
—	FW	COL	Óscar Perea (at AVS until 30 June 2026)

== Management team ==
Position	Name
Head coach	(England) Gary O'Neil
Assistant head coach	Vacant
First-team coach	Vacant
Goalkeeping coach	(France) Sébastien Gimenez
Fitness coach	(France) Dany Eberhardt
Youth coach	(France) Martin Djetou (France) Guillaume Lacour
Video analyst	(Comoros) Hachim Ali M'Bae

== Transfers and contracts ==
=== In ===
Date	Pos.	Player	From	Fee	Ref.
24 June 2025	CB	(Republic of Ireland) Andrew Omobamidele	(England) Nottingham Forest	Undisclosed	
26 June 2025	RW	(England) Sam Amo-Ameyaw	(England) Southampton	Undisclosed	
27 June 2025	MF	(Senegal) Pape Demba Diop	(Belgium) Zulte Waregem	Undisclosed	
2 July 2025	LB	(Argentina) Valentín Barco	(England) Brighton & Hove Albion	£7,870,000	
7 July 2025	CB	(France) Soumaïla Coulibaly	(Germany) Borussia Dortmund	Undisclosed	
16 July 2025	MF	(Poland) Maxi Oyedele	(Poland) Legia Warsaw	€6,000,000	
27 July 2025	FW	(Argentina) Joaquín Panichelli	(Spain) Alavés	Undisclosed	
30 July 2025	LB	(England) Ishé Samuels-Smith	(England) Chelsea	£6,500,000	
9 August 2025	CB	(Denmark) Lucas Høgsberg	(Denmark) Nordsjælland	Undisclosed	
16 August 2025	GK	(France) Stefan Bajic	(England) Bristol City	Undisclosed	
1 September 2025	CAM	(Paraguay) Julio Enciso	(England) Brighton & Hove Albion	Undisclosed	
1 September 2025	LB	(England) Ben Chilwell	(England) Chelsea	Undisclosed	

=== Out ===
Date	Pos.	Player	To	Fee	Ref.
9 June 2025	DF	(Senegal) Mamadou Sarr (Note: Transfer for 2025–26 season, but eligible to play in 2024–25 season for the 2025 FIFA Club World Cup)	(England) Chelsea	£12,000,000	
18 June 2025	FW	(Martinique) Jérémy Sebas	(France) Bastia	Undisclosed	
1 July 2025	CM	(Senegal) Habib Diarra	(England) Sunderland	£30,000,000	
1 July 2025	RB	(France) Marvin Senaya	(France) Auxerre	Undisclosed	
1 July 2025	MF	(France) Jessy Deminguet	(France) Metz	Undisclosed	
1 July 2025	GK	(Morocco) Alaa Bellaarouch	(Portugal) Braga	Undisclosed	
4 July 2025	GK	(France) Robin Risser	(France) Lens	Undisclosed	
5 July 2025	CB	(France) Steven Baseya	(Portugal) Alverca	Undisclosed	
13 July 2025	LB	(France) Thomas Delaine	(France) Le Havre	Undisclosed	
16 July 2025	FW	(Ivory Coast) Patrick Ouotro	(France) Nancy	Undisclosed	
24 July 2025	FW	(Comoros) Aboubacar Ali Abdallah	(Belgium) Francs Borains	Undisclosed	
29 July 2025	FW	(Ivory Coast) Moïse Sahi Dion	(Belgium) Dender	Undisclosed	
1 September 2025	LB	(England) Ishé Samuels-Smith	(England) Chelsea	Undisclosed	
1 September 2025	RW	(France) Dilane Bakwa	(England) Nottingham Forest	Undisclosed	

=== Loaned in ===
Date	Pos.	Player	From	Ref.
28 July 2025	GK	(Belgium) Mike Penders	(England) Chelsea	
31 July 2025	AM	(Ecuador) Kendry Páez	(England) Chelsea	
1 August 2025	CB	(Senegal) Mamadou Sarr	(England) Chelsea	
2 February 2026	CB	(Argentina) Aarón Anselmino	(England) Chelsea	
2 February 2026	ST	(Ivory Coast) David Datro Fofana	(England) Chelsea	

=== Loaned out ===
Date	Pos.	Player	To	Ref.
14 July 2025	CB	(France) Yoni Gomis	(Belgium) Beveren	
16 July 2025	MF	(Senegal) Pape Diong	(France) Dunkerque	
12 August 2025	FW	(Serbia) Miloš Luković	(Spain) Las Palmas	
31 August 2025	MF	(Senegal) Pape Demba Diop	(Germany) 1. FC Nürnberg	

== Competitions ==
=== Overall record ===
Competition	First match	Last match	Starting round	Final position	Record							
Competition	First match	Last match	Starting round	Final position	Pld	W	D	L	GF	GA	GD	Win %
Ligue 1	17 August 2025	17 May 2026	Matchday 1	8th	34	15	8	11	58	47	+11	44.12
Coupe de France	21 December 2025	22 April 2026	Round of 64	Semi-finals	5	4	0	1	13	5	+8	80.00
UEFA Conference League	21 August 2025	7 May 2026	Play-off round	Semi-finals	14	8	3	3	21	13	+8	57.14
Total					53	27	11	15	92	65	+27	50.94

Source: Soccerway

=== Ligue 1 ===
==== League table ====
Pos	Team	Pld	W	D	L	GF	GA	GD	Pts	Qualification or relegation
6	Rennes	34	17	8	9	59	50	+9	59	Qualification for the Europa League league phase (Note: Since the 2025–26 Coupe de France winners, Lens, qualified for the Champions League via league position, the Europa League spot awarded to the cup winners was passed to the sixth-placed team, and the Conference League spot was passed to the seventh-placed team.)
7	Monaco	34	16	6	12	60	54	+6	54	Qualification for the Conference League play-off round
8	Strasbourg	34	15	8	11	58	47	+11	53	
9	Toulouse	34	12	9	13	47	46	+1	45	
10	Lorient	34	11	12	11	48	51	−3	45	

Source: Ligue 1
Rules for classification: 1) Points; 2) Goal difference; 3) Head-to-head points; 4) Head-to-head goal difference; 5) Head-to-head goals scored; 6) Head-to-head away goals scored; 7) Goals scored; 8) Away goals scored; 9) Fair-play points (Note: Head-to-head record is used only after all the matches between the teams in question have been played).

==== Results summary ====
Overall								Home						Away					
Pld	W	D	L	GF	GA	GD	Pts	W	D	L	GF	GA	GD	W	D	L	GF	GA	GD
34	15	8	11	58	47	+11	53	9	3	5	30	19	+11	6	5	6	28	28	0

Source: Ligue 1

==== Results by round ====
Round	1	2	3	4	5	6	7	8	9	10	11	12	13	14	15	16	17	18	19	20	21	22	23	24	25	26	27	28	30	31	32	33	29^{1}	34
Ground	A	H	A	H	A	H	H	A	A	H	A	H	A	H	A	H	A	H	A	H	A	A	H	H	A	H	A	H	H	A	H	A	A	H
Result	W	W	L	W	W	L	W	D	L	W	L	W	L	L	L	D	D	W	W	L	L	D	W	D	D	D	W	W	L	W	L	D	W	W
Position	3	4	6	5	5	5	3	3	7	4	7	4	5	8	8	7	7	7	7	7	7	7	7	8	8	8	8	8	8	8	8	8	8	8

Source: Ligue 1
A = Away; H = Home; W = Win; D = Draw; L = Loss

^{1} Matchday 29 (vs Brest) was postponed due to Strasbourg's involvement in the UEFA Conference League.

==== Matches ====
17 August 2025 1	Metz	0–1	Strasbourg	Longeville-lès-Metz
17:15 CEST (UTC+2)		Report	Panichelli 86'	Stadium: Stade Saint-Symphorien; Attendance: 25,009; Referee: Mathieu Vernice

24 August 2025 2	Strasbourg	1–0	Nantes	Strasbourg
17:15 CEST (UTC+2)	Emegha 81'	Report		Stadium: Stade de la Meinau; Attendance: 22,468; Referee: Bastien Dechepy

31 August 2025 3	Monaco	3–2	Strasbourg	Monaco
17:15 CEST (UTC+2)	Akliouche 6', (yellow card) 90+11'; Balogun 48'; Minamino 90+6'; Mamadou Coulibaly (yellow card) 90+11'	Report	Doukouré (yellow card) 8'; Bakwa 73'; Panichelli 76' (pen.); Nzingoula (red card) 90+9'	Stadium: Stade Louis II; Attendance: 8,718; Referee: Benoît Bastien

14 September 2025 4	Strasbourg	1–0	Le Havre	Strasbourg
17:15 CEST (UTC+2)	Panichelli 90+1' (pen.); Høgsberg (red card) 90+4'	Report		Stadium: Stade de la Meinau; Attendance: 22,250; Referee: Willy Delajod

21 September 2025 5	Paris FC	2–3	Strasbourg	Paris
15:00 CEST (UTC+2)	Dicko 81'; Gory 90+4'	Report	Godo (yellow card) 21'; Páez 27'; Sarr (yellow card) 74'; Doue 78'; Emegha 87', (yellow card) 90'; Barco (yellow card) 90+2'; Penders (yellow card) 90+10'	Stadium: Stade Jean-Bouin; Attendance: 17,912; Referee: François Letexier

26 September 2025 6	Strasbourg	1–2	Marseille	Strasbourg
20:45 CEST (UTC+2)	Emegha (yellow card) 45+1'; Ouattara 49'; Amo-Ameyaw (yellow card) 66'	Report	Aguerd (yellow card) 24'; Murillo (yellow card) 27', (goal) 90+1'; O'Riley (yellow card) 38'; Balerdi (yellow card) 45'; Aubameyang 78'	Stadium: Stade de la Meinau; Attendance: 23,262; Referee: Jérémie Pignard

5 October 2025 7	Strasbourg	5–0	Angers	Strasbourg
17:15 CEST (UTC+2)	Barco (yellow card) 26'; Panichelli 36', 51'; Moreira (yellow card) 59'; Ouattara 61'; Godo 66', 70'	Report	Belkebla (yellow card) 6'; Camara (yellow card) 79'	Stadium: Stade de la Meinau; Attendance: 22,171; Referee: Guillaume Paradis

17 October 2025 8	Paris Saint-Germain	3–3	Strasbourg	Paris
20:45 CEST (UTC+2)	Barcola 6'; Ramos 58' (pen.); Hernandez (yellow card) 60'; Lee (yellow card) 74'; Mayulu 79'	Report	Panichelli 26', 49'; Moreira 41'; Penders (yellow card) 56'	Stadium: Parc des Princes; Attendance: 47,754; Referee: Clément Turpin

26 October 2025 9	Lyon	2–1	Strasbourg	Décines-Charpieu
20:45 CET (UTC+1)	Doukouré 31' (o.g.); Tolisso (penalty missed) 43'; Moreira 90+1'	Report	Panichelli 25'; Moreira (yellow card) 61'; Doukouré (red card) 67'; Sarr (yellow card) 68'; Doué (yellow card) 80'; Lemaréchal (yellow card) 90+6'	Stadium: Parc Olympique Lyonnais; Attendance: 49,058; Referee: Eric Wattellier

29 October 2025 10	Strasbourg	3–0	Auxerre	Strasbourg
22:05 CEST (UTC+2)	Panichelli 46'; Nanasi 55'; Barco 60'; Godo (yellow card) 90+4'	Report	Matondo (yellow card) 90+2'	Stadium: Stade de la Meinau; Attendance: 22,667; Referee: Ruddy Buquet

2 November 2025 11	Rennes	4–1	Strasbourg	Rennes
15:00 CET (UTC+1)	Lepaul 9', 48', 60'; Meïté 35'; Frankowski (yellow card) 90+4'	Report	Nanasi 77'; Chilwell (yellow card) 83'	Stadium: Roazhon Park; Attendance: 27,658; Referee: Thomas Léonard

9 November 2025 12	Strasbourg	2–0	Lille	Strasbourg
17:15 CET (UTC+1)	Emegha 33', 62'; Panichelli (yellow card) 35'; Enciso (yellow card) 37'; Chilwell (yellow card) 65'; Penders (yellow card) 80'	Report	Perraud (yellow card) 37'; André (yellow card) 90+3'; Verdonk (red card) 90+3'; Mukau (yellow card) 90+5'	Stadium: Stade de la Meinau; Attendance: 29,000; Referee: François Letexier

22 November 2025 13	Lens	1–0	Strasbourg	Lens
17:00 CET (UTC+1)	Ganiou 69'; Thomasson (yellow card) 77'; Guilavogui (red card) 90+5'; Sotoca (yellow card) 90+6'	Report	El Mourabet (yellow card) 2'; Doué (yellow card) 68'; Barco (red card) 77'; Emegha (yellow card) 90+7'	Stadium: Stade Bollaert-Delelis; Attendance: 38,211; Referee: Jérôme Brisard

30 November 2025 14	Strasbourg	1–2	Brest	Strasbourg
15:00 CET (UTC+1)	Amo-Ameyaw 11'	Report	Del Castillo 55' (pen.); Chardonnet (yellow card) 44'; Magnetti 82'; Ajorque (yellow card) 90'; Lala (yellow card) 90+2'	Stadium: Stade de la Meinau; Attendance: 30,017; Referee: Bastien Dechepy

6 December 2025 15	Toulouse	1–0	Strasbourg	Toulouse
19:00 CET (UTC+1)	Emersonn 18'; Cásseres (yellow card) 28'; Magri (yellow card) 44'; Messali (yellow card) 90+4'	Report	Moreira (yellow card) 82'; El Mourabet (yellow card) 85'; Chilwell (yellow card) 89'	Stadium: Stadium de Toulouse; Attendance: 22,031; Referee: Stéphanie Frappart

14 December 2025 16	Strasbourg	0–0	Lorient	Strasbourg
17:15 CET (UTC+1)	Omobamidele (yellow card) 50'	Report		Stadium: Stade de la Meinau; Attendance: 29,951; Referee: Gaël Angoula

3 January 2026 17	Nice	1–1	Strasbourg	Nice
19:00 CET (UTC+1)	Oppong (yellow card) 4'; Wahi 54'	Report	Panichelli 13' (pen.); Doukouré (yellow card) 35'; Amougou (yellow card) 90+3'	Stadium: Allianz Riviera; Attendance: 18,365; Referee: Clément Turpin

18 January 2026 18	Strasbourg	2–1	Metz	Strasbourg
15:00 CET (UTC+1)	Moreira 12'; Barco (yellow card) 25'; Høgsberg (yellow card) 25'; Godo 43'	Report	Hein 24' (pen.); Sané (yellow card) 39'; Tsitaishvili (yellow card) 45+2'; Yegbe (yellow card) 58'	Stadium: Stade de la Meinau; Attendance: 30,612; Referee: Jérémie Pignard

25 January 2026 19	Lille	1–4	Strasbourg	Villeneuve-d'Ascq
20:45 CET (UTC+1)	Bouaddi (yellow card) 36'; Perraud (yellow card) 63'; Fernandez-Pardo 90+3'	Report	Panichelli 25'; Enciso 26'; Doué (yellow card) 36'; El Mourabet (yellow card) 55'; Godo 58', 72'	Stadium: Stade Pierre-Mauroy; Attendance: 38,551; Referee: Willy Delajod

1 February 2026 20	Strasbourg	1–2	Paris Saint-Germain	Strasbourg
20:45 CET (UTC+1)	Panichelli (penalty missed) 20'; Doué 27'; Moreira (yellow card) 90+6'	Report	Mayulu 22'; Hakimi (red card) 75'; Mendes 81'	Stadium: Stade de la Meinau; Attendance: 31,324; Referee: Éric Wattellier

8 February 2026 21	Le Havre	2–1	Strasbourg	Le Havre
17:15CET (UTC+1)	Zagadou 26'; Soumaré 54', (yellow card) 85'; Gourna-Douath (yellow card) 74'	Report	Doukouré (red card) 29'; Chilwell (yellow card) 32'; Godo 36'	Stadium: Stade Océane; Attendance: 18,014; Referee: Abdelatif Kherradji

14 February 2026 22	Marseille	2–2	Strasbourg	Marseille
17:00 CET (UTC+1)	Greenwood 14'; Pavard (yellow card) 26'; Aguerd (yellow card) 42'; Gouiri 47'; Paixão (yellow card) 72'; Weah (yellow card) 90+8'	Report	Nanasi 73'; Panichelli (yellow card) 83', (goal) 90+7' (pen.); Barco (yellow card) 90+9'	Stadium: Stade Vélodrome; Attendance: 59,238; Referee: François Letexier

22 February 2026 23	Strasbourg	3–1	Lyon	Strasbourg
20:45 CET (UTC+1)	Godo 37'; Moreira 52'; Omobamidele (yellow card) 57'; Panichelli 83' (pen.)	Report	Kluivert (yellow card) 57'; Tolisso 59'; Endrick (yellow card) 60'	Stadium: Stade de la Meinau; Attendance: 29,000; Referee: Ruddy Buquet

27 February 2026 24	Strasbourg	1–1	Lens	Strasbourg
18:45 CET (UTC+1)	Ouattara (yellow card) 4'; Panichelli 18'; Enciso (yellow card) 79'	Report	Thomasson (yellow card) 45+1'; Sangaré 62'; Udol (yellow card) 87'	Stadium: Stade de la Meinau; Attendance: 29,000; Referee: Clément Turpin

7 March 2026 25	Auxerre	0–0	Strasbourg	Auxerre
19:00 CET (UTC+1)	Mensah (yellow card) 43'; Senaya (yellow card) 56'	Report	El Mourabet (yellow card) 11'; Omobamidele (yellow card) 63'	Stadium: Stade de l'Abbé-Deschamps; Attendance: 16,237; Referee: Jérémie Pignard

15 March 2026 26	Strasbourg	0–0	Paris FC	Strasbourg
15:00 CET (UTC+1)	Omobamidele (yellow card) 37'	Report		Stadium: Stade de la Meinau; Attendance: 29,865; Referee: Benoît Millot

22 March 2026 27	Nantes	2–3	Strasbourg	Nantes
21:45 CET (UTC+1)	Tabibou 6'; Sissoko (yellow card) 45+3'; Lepenant (yellow card) 51'; Abline 53'; Guirassy (yellow card) 90+1'	Report	Barco (yellow card) 16'; Amo-Ameyaw (yellow card) 29'; Oyedele 45+2', (yellow card) 58'; Panichelli 78', 90+2'	Stadium: Stade de la Beaujoire; Attendance: 21,878; Referee: Mathieu Vernice

4 April 2026 28	Strasbourg	3–1	Nice	Strasbourg
17:00 CEST (UTC+2)	Godo 28'; Enciso 36'; El Mourabet 42'	Report	Boudaoui (yellow card) 41'; Sanson (yellow card) 43'; Mendy 82'	Stadium: Stade de la Meinau; Attendance: 29,000; Referee: Thomas Léonard

19 April 2026 30	Strasbourg	0–3	Rennes	Strasbourg
17:15 CEST (UTC+2)		Report	Lepaul 20'; Szymański (yellow card) 44'; Embolo 50'; Al-Taamari 52'	Stadium: Stade de la Meinau; Attendance: 29,000; Referee: Ruddy Buquet

26 April 2026 31	Lorient	2–3	Strasbourg	Lorient
15:00 CEST (UTC+2)	Cadiou 26'; Pagis 54' (pen.); Katseris (yellow card) 71'	Report	Høgsberg (yellow card) 25'; Nanasi 62'; Oyedele (yellow card) 73'; Adjei 90+2' (o.g.); Omobamidele 90+9'	Stadium: Stade du Moustoir; Attendance: 15,674; Referee: Benoît Millot

3 May 2026 32	Strasbourg	1–2	Toulouse	Strasbourg
17:15 CEST (UTC+2)	Diémé (yellow card) 20'; Amo-Ameyaw 27'	Report	Methalie 43' (yellow card); Vossah (yellow card) 75'; Emersonn 84'; Dønnum (yellow card) 90+7'	Stadium: Stade de la Meinau; Attendance: 30,246; Referee: Gaël Angoula

10 May 2026 33	Angers	1–1	Strasbourg	Angers
21:00 CEST (UTC+2)		Report		Stadium: Stade Raymond Kopa

13 May 2026 29	Brest	1–2	Strasbourg	Brest
19:00 CEST (UTC+2)		Report		Stadium: Stade Francis-Le Blé

17 May 2026 34	Strasbourg	5–4	Monaco	Strasbourg
21:00 CEST (UTC+2)	Godo 34', 84'; Moreira 58'; Nanasi 61', 72'; Noubissie (yellow card) 69'	Report	Camara 10', 42', (yellow card) 51'; Mawissa (yellow card) 31'; Fati 45+2'; Doukouré 55' (o.g.)	Stadium: Stade de la Meinau; Attendance: 30,321; Referee: Benoît Bastien

=== Coupe de France ===
21 December 2025 Round of 64	Strasbourg	2–1	Dunkerque	Strasbourg
14:45 CET (UTC+1)	Enciso 26'; Doukouré 40'	Report	Robinet 54' (pen.)	Stadium: Stade de la Meinau; Attendance: 27,707; Referee: Benoît Bastien

10 January 2026 Round of 32	Avranches	0–6	Strasbourg	Avranches
18:00 CET (UTC+1)	Boateng (yellow card) 42'; Dudouit (yellow card) 45+2'; Herbin (yellow card) 85'	Report	Panichelli 13'; Enciso 22', 89'; Moreira 39'; Sylla (yellow card) 48'; Godo 57'; Amougou (yellow card) 63'; Nanasi 67'; Penders (yellow card) 85'	Stadium: Stade René Fenouillère; Attendance: 4,300; Referee: Mathieu Vernice

5 February 2026 Round of 16	Strasbourg	3–1	Monaco	Strasbourg
21:00 CET (UTC+1)	Godo 7'; Barco (yellow card) 22'; Enciso 55', 61'	Report	Biereth (yellow card) 11', (goal) 58'; Vanderson (yellow card) 22'; Zakaria (yellow card) 27'; Golovin (yellow card) 40'	Stadium: Stade de la Meinau; Attendance: 29,586; Referee: Jérémy Stinat

3 March 2026 Quarter-finals	Strasbourg	2–1	Reims	Strasbourg
20:00 CET (UTC+1)	Yassine (yellow card) 37'; Panichelli 83' (pen.); Enciso 87' (pen.)	Report	Pallois (yellow card) 79'; Olliero (yellow card) 86'; Zabi 90+4'	Stadium: Stade de la Meinau; Attendance: 29,848; Referee: Éric Wattelier

22 April 2026 Semi-finals	Strasbourg	0–2	Nice	Strasbourg
21:00 CEST (UTC+2)		Report	Wahi 51', 82' (pen.)	Stadium: Stade de la Meinau; Referee: François Letexier

=== UEFA Conference League ===
==== Play-off round ====
Win Draw Loss Fixtures

The draw for the play-off round was held on 4 August 2025.

21 August 2025 First leg	Strasbourg (France)	0–0	(Denmark) Brøndby	Stade de la Meinau, Strasbourg
20:00		Report		Attendance: 22,080; Referee: Genc Nuza (Kosovo)

28 August 2025 Second leg	Brøndby (Denmark)	2–3 (2–3 agg.)	(France) Strasbourg	Brøndby Stadium, Brøndbyvester
20:00	Wass 45'; Gregoritsch 86'	Report	Emegha 15', 66'; Doukouré 40'	Attendance: 23,930; Referee: Nenad Minaković (Serbia)

==== League phase ====
Pos	Team	Pld	W	D	L	GF	GA	GD	Pts	Qualification
1	(French Football Federation) Strasbourg	6	5	1	0	11	5	+6	16	Advance to round of 16 (seeded)
2	(Polish Football Association) Raków Częstochowa	6	4	2	0	9	2	+7	14	Advance to round of 16 (seeded)
3	(Hellenic Football Federation) AEK Athens	6	4	1	1	14	7	+7	13	Advance to round of 16 (seeded)
4	(Football Association of the Czech Republic) Sparta Prague	6	4	1	1	10	3	+7	13	Advance to round of 16 (seeded)
5	(Royal Spanish Football Federation) Rayo Vallecano	6	4	1	1	13	7	+6	13	Advance to round of 16 (seeded)

Source: UEFA
Rules for classification: League phase tiebreakers

Round	1	2	3	4	5	6
Ground	A	H	H	A	A	H
Result	W	D	W	W	W	W
Position	12	9	7	2	1	1
Points	3	4	7	10	13	16

Updated to match(es) played on 15 November 2025. Source: UEFA
A = Away; H = Home; W = Win; D = Draw; L = Loss

2 October 2025 1	Slovan Bratislava (Slovakia)	1–2	(France) Strasbourg	Tehelné pole, Bratislava
21:00	Ibrahim 64'	Report	Yirajang 26' (o.g.); Ouattara 41'	Attendance: 15,204; Referee: Andrea Colombo (Italy)

23 October 2025 2	Strasbourg (France)	1–1	(Poland) Jagiellonia Białystok	Stade de la Meinau, Strasbourg
18:45	Panichelli 79'	Report	Stojinović 52'	Attendance: 21,748; Referee: Dario Bel (Croatia)

6 November 2025 3	BK Häcken (Sweden)	1–2	(France) Strasbourg	Gamla Ullevi, Gothenburg (Note: BK Häcken will play their home matches at Gamla Ullevi, Gothenburg, instead of their regular stadium, Bravida Arena, Gothenburg, which did not meet UEFA requirements.)
21:00	Lundqvist (yellow card) 56'; Dembe 61'; Holm (yellow card) 90+1'	Report	Enciso 21'; Godo 60', (yellow card) 69'	Attendance: 4,082; Referee: Luca Pairetto (Italy)

27 November 2025 4	Strasbourg (France)	2–1	(England) Crystal Palace	Strasbourg, France
21:00 CET	Emegha 53'; El Mourabet (yellow card) 73', (goal) 77'	Report	Mitchell 35'; Lacroix (yellow card) 67'; Canvot (yellow card) 86'	Stadium: Stade de la Meinau; Attendance: 29,528; Referee: Javier Alberola Rojas (Spain)

11 December 2025 5	Aberdeen (Scotland)	0–1	(France) Strasbourg	Pittodrie Stadium, Aberdeen
21:00 (20:00 UTC+0)	Knoester (yellow card) 7'; Lobban (yellow card) 75'	Report	Páez (yellow card) 20'; Luís (yellow card) 33'; Godo 35'; Doué (yellow card) 39'; Nzingoula (yellow card) 82'; Barco (yellow card) 90+5'	Attendance: 15,404; Referee: Robert Schröder (Germany)

18 December 2025 6	Strasbourg (France)	3–1	(Iceland) Breiðablik	Stade de la Meinau, Strasbourg
21:00	Nanasi 11'; Godo 80'; Enciso 90+4'	Report	Margeirsson (yellow card) 19'; Gunnlaugsson 37'; Thorsteinsson (yellow card) 42'	Attendance: 24,416; Referee: Ondrej Berka (Czechia)

==== Knockout phase ====
===== Round of 16 =====
The draw for the round of 16 took place on 27 February 2026.

12 March 2026 First leg	Rijeka (Croatia)	1–2	(France) Strasbourg	Rijeka, Croatia
19:45 CET (UTC+1)	Majstorović (yellow card) 52', (goal) 76'; Fruk (yellow card) 45'	Report	Panichelli 2'; Doukouré (yellow card) 29'; Omobamidele (yellow card) 47'; Godo 72'; Doué (yellow card) 84'	Stadium: Stadion Rujevica; Attendance: 8,154; Referee: Vasilis Fotias (Greece)

19 March 2026 Second leg	Strasbourg (France)	1–1 (3–2 agg.)	(Croatia) Rijeka	Strasbourg, France
22:00 CET (UTC+1)	Barco 71'	Report	Fruk 21'; Husić (yellow card) 31'; Radeljić (yellow card) 68'; Barco (yellow card) 90+5'	Stadium: Stade de la Meinau; Attendance: 24,233; Referee: Mykola Balakin (Ukraine)

===== Quarter-final =====
9 April 2026 First leg	Mainz (Germany)	2–0	(France) Strasbourg	Mainz, Germany
20:00 CET	Sano 11'; Posch 19', (yellow card) 90+5'; Sieb 90+5'	Report	Doué (yellow card) 31'; Moreira (yellow card) 90+5'	Stadium: Mewa Arena; Attendance: 32,000; Referee: Rade Obrenovič (Slovenia)

16 April 2026 Second leg	Strasbourg (France)	4–0 (4–2 agg.)	(Germany) Mainz	Strasbourg, France
20:00 CET	Nanasi 26', (yellow card) 45'; Ouattara 35'; Barco (yellow card) 36'; El Mourabet (yellow card) 49'; Emegha (penalty missed) 66', 74'; Enciso 69'; Moreira (yellow card) 90+3'; Godo (yellow card) 90+6'	Report	Kohr (yellow card) 19'; Zentner (yellow card) 60'; Sieb (yellow card) 90+4'; Veratschnig (yellow card) 90+4'; Amiri (red card) 90+6'	Stadium: Stade de la Meinau; Attendance: 30,631; Referee: João Pinheiro (Portugal)

===== Semi-final =====
30 April 2026 First leg	Rayo Vallecano (Spain)	1–0	(France) Strasbourg	Madrid, Spain
20:00 CET	Alemão 54'	Report		Stadium: Vallecas Stadium; Attendance: 14,333; Referee: Donatas Rumšas (Lithuania)

7 May 2026 Second leg	Strasbourg (France)	0–1 (0–2 agg.)	(Spain) Rayo Vallecano	Strasbourg, France
20:00 CET		Report	Alemão 42'	Stadium: Stade de la Meinau; Attendance: 31,071; Referee: Ivan Kružliak (Slovakia)
