= Lucas Høgsberg =

Danish footballer (born 2006)

Personal information
- Full name: Lucas Høgsberg
- Date of birth: 23 June 2006 (age 20)
- Place of birth: Farum, Denmark
- Height: 1.87 m (6 ft 2 in)
- Position: Defender

Team information
- Current team: Strasbourg
- Number: 24

Youth career
- 2010–2023: Nordsjælland

Senior career*
Years	Team	Apps	(Gls)
2023–2025	Nordsjælland	32	(0)
2025–	Strasbourg	28	(0)

International career^{‡}
2021–2022	Denmark U16	9	(1)
2022–2023	Denmark U17	11	(2)
2023–2024	Denmark U19	20	(0)
2025–	Denmark	6	(0)
Medal record
Men's football
Representing Denmark
UEFA European Under-17 Championship
Bronze medal – third place	2024 Cyprus
- * Club domestic league appearances and goals as of 17:04, 11 October 2026 (UTC) ‡ National team caps and goals as of 23:31, 7 June 2026 (UTC)

Lucas Høgsberg (born 23 June 2006) is a Danish footballer who plays as a defender for Ligue 1 club Strasbourg and the Denmark national team.

== Club career ==
=== Nordsjælland ===
Lucas Høgsberg is a product of FC Nordsjælland, where started playing at the age of three, and played his way up through the club's youth ranks. In February 2023, 16-year-old Høgsberg was selected for Nordsjælland's training camp in Turkey.

On 5 April 2022, 16-year old Høgsberg got his official debut for Nordsjælland against Aarhus Fremad in the Danish Cup. On 22 May 2023, Høgsberg also got his Danish Superliga debut when he came off the bench for the final minutes against Randers FC in the Danish Superliga. Just a few days earlier, 16-year-old Høgsberg had just been permanently promoted to the first team squad.

On 13 August 2024, Høgsberg extended his contract until June 2028. On 16 September 2024, in a match against Randers FC, 18-year-old Høgsberg recorded his first assist at senior level when he set up Jeppe Tverskov's 1–1 score.

After an autumn in the 2024–25 season where Høgsberg had become a starter for Nordsjælland, in late January 2025 there were rumors of strong interest from Italian Serie A club Como 1907, who had reportedly offered 10 million euros for the Dane, which was rejected by Nordsjælland.

=== Strasbourg ===
On 9 August 2025, it was confirmed that 19-year-old Høgsberg had transferred to the French Ligue 1 club Strasbourg on a contract until June 2030. According to several media outlets, the price was around €15 million.

== International career ==
In March 2025, 18-year-old Høgsberg was called up for the Danish national team for the first time for the 2024-25 UEFA Nations League A quarterfinals against Portugal.

== Career statistics ==
=== Club ===
As of match played 11 October 2026

Appearances and goals by club, season and competition
Club	Season	League			National cup (Note: Includes Danish Cup, Coupe de France)		Europe		Total	
Club	Season	Division	Apps	Goals	Apps	Goals	Apps	Goals	Apps	Goals
Nordsjælland	2022–23	Danish Superliga	1	0	1	0	—		2	0
Nordsjælland	2023–24	Danish Superliga	0	0	1	0	—		1	0
Nordsjælland	2024–25	Danish Superliga	28	0	2	0	—		30	0
Nordsjælland	2025–26	Danish Superliga	3	0	—		—		3	0
Nordsjælland	Total		32	0	4	0	—		36	0
Strasbourg	2025–26	Ligue 1	24	0	4	0	11 (Note: Appearances in UEFA Conference League)	0	39	0
Strasbourg	2026–27	Ligue 1	4	0	0	0	—		4	0
Strasbourg	Total		28	0	4	0	11	0	43	0
Career total			60	0	8	0	11	0	79	0

=== International ===
As of match played 7 June 2026

Appearances and goals by national team and year
National team	Year	Apps	Goals
Denmark	2025	3	0
Denmark	2026	3	0
Total		6	0
