= Martial Godo =

Ivorian footballer (born 2003)

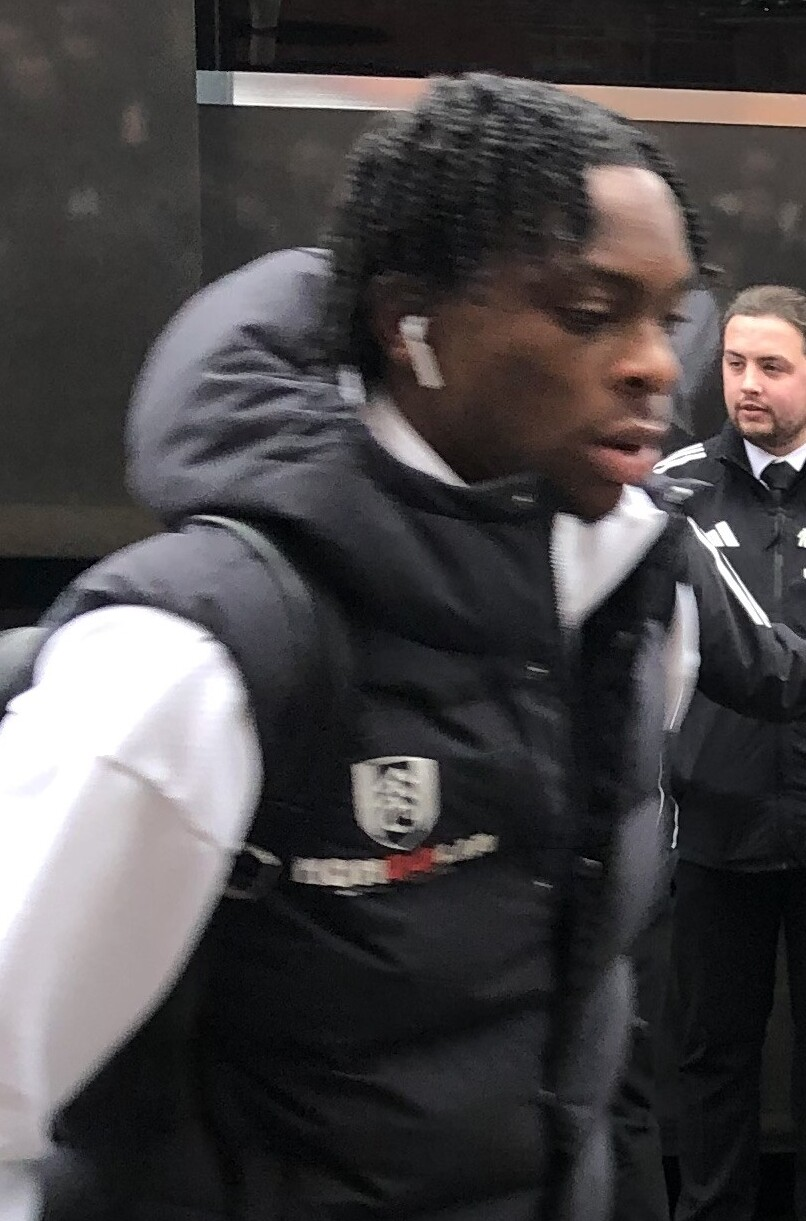
- Godo with Fulham in 2024

Personal information
- Full name: Becket Fabrice-Martial Godo
- Date of birth: 14 March 2003 (age 23)
- Place of birth: Greenwich, England
- Height: 1.69 m (5 ft 7 in)
- Position: Left winger

Team information
- Current team: Strasbourg
- Number: 20

Youth career
- 2019–2021: Dartford

Senior career*
Years	Team	Apps	(Gls)
2021–2022	Dartford	0	(0)
2021–2022	→ Margate (dual registration)	18	(3)
2022–2025	Fulham	2	(0)
2023–2024	→ Wigan Athletic (loan)	34	(4)
2025–	Strasbourg	28	(10)

International career^{‡}
2023–2024	England U20	6	(0)
2025–	Ivory Coast U23	1	(0)
2026–	Ivory Coast	1	(1)
- * Club domestic league appearances and goals as of 23:04, 17 May 2026 (UTC) ‡ National team caps and goals as of 16:05, 28 March 2026 (UTC)

Becket Fabrice-Martial Godo (born 14 March 2003), known as Martial Godo, is a professional footballer who plays as a left winger for Ligue 1 club Strasbourg. Born in England, he plays for the Ivory Coast national team.

== Club career ==
Godo started his professional football career at Dartford when he joined them in 2019 and progressed through the club's youth system. Godo moved to join Margate on a dual registration with Dartford Academy. He made his debut for the club, coming on as a 78th minute substitute, in a 2–1 win against Cray Wanderers on 31 August 2021. Godo then scored his first professional football goal, scoring the winning goal, in a 2–1 win against Enfield Town on 25 September 2021. He scored two consecutive goals between 27 December 2021 and 1 January 2022 against Cray Wanderers and Folkestone Invicta. By the time Godo departed Margate, he had made eighteen appearances, scoring three times in all competitions for the side.

=== Fulham ===
Godo left Margate in March 2022 to sign for Championship side Fulham, following a successful trial period, and was immediately sent to the U21 team. His first appearance for Fulham's U21 team came on 18 March 2022, in a 0–0 draw against Middlesbrough U21. On 23 August 2022, he made his Fulham first team debut, coming on as a second-half substitute, in a 2–0 loss against Crawley Town in the second round of the EFL Cup.

Godo spoke about his development at the club's U21 team throughout the 2022–23 season. He later scored two goals in the 2022–23 season, coming against Tottenham Hotspur U21 and Brighton & Hove Albion U21. At the end of the 2022–23 season, Fulham opted to take up their option of a contract extension that would ensure Godo remained under contract for the 2023–24 season.

On 7 August 2023, he signed his first professional contract with the club on a two-year contract. Soon after, Godo scored five goals in the first month to the 2023–24 season, including two braces, coming against Wolverhampton Wanderers U21 and Crystal Palace U21. As a result of his performance prior to his loan move to Wigan Athletic, he was named PL2 Player of the Month Award for August.

=== Wigan Athletic (loan) ===
On 1 September 2023, Godo joined Wigan Athletic on a season-long loan.

He made his debut for the club, starting the match, and set up a goal for Thelo Aasgaard, in a 2–1 win against Cambridge United on 16 September 2023. Two weeks later on 30 September 2023, Godo scored his first goal for Wigan Athletic, in a 2–1 loss against Portsmouth. For his performance, he won the club's Player of the Month for September. After joining Wigan Athletic, Godo became a first team regular, playing in either left-wing and right-wing position. He scored his second goal of the season, scoring from 12 yards, in a 2–0 win against Exeter City on 21 October 2023. One week later on 31 October, Godo set up two late goals for the Latics, as the club lost 3–2 against Charlton Athletic. This was followed up by scoring the opener, in a 2–1 win against Peterborough United.

However, he suffered ankle injury that saw him out for the rest of 2024. Godo made his return to the starting line-up from injury, in a 1–1 draw against Barnsley on 1 January 2024. However, his return was short-lived when he suffered a calf injury and was substituted in the 38th minute during a 1–0 win against Reading. After missing only one match, he made his return from injury, coming on as a second-half substitute, in a 3–2 loss against Stevenage on 27 January 2024.

After returning from injury, Godo regained his first team place, once again, playing in either left-wing and right-wing position. On 1 April 2024, he scored his fourth goal for Wigan Athletic, in a 3–1 loss against Cambridge United. By the end of the 2023–24 season, Godo had made thirty-seven appearances, scoring four times in all competitions. Following this, he returned to his parent club. Godo reflected on his time at the Latics, crediting the club for helping him "growing up from a boy into a man".

=== Strasbourg ===
On 1 September 2025, Godo joined French Ligue 1 side Strasbourg for a reported fee of £6 million. He signed a five-year deal with the club.

== International career ==
Born in England to Ivorian-French parents, Godo holds dual Ivorian-French citizenship. On 10 November 2023, he was called up to the England U20 squad for the first time. Six days later on 16 November 2023, he made his England U20 debut as a substitute during a 3–0 defeat to Italy at the Eco-Power Stadium. In a follow-up match against Germany U20, Godo made his first start for England U20; but in the second-half, he scored an own-goal in the 55th minute before amending his mistake four minutes later by assisting an equaliser, as England U20 won 3–2. On 28 May 2025, he was called up to the Ivory Coast U23s for a set of friendly matches. He made his debut for Ivory Coast U23 in a friendly 3–0 loss to the Netherlands U21 on 6 June 2025.

Godo was called up to the senior Ivory Coast national team for a set of friendlies in March 2026.

== Career statistics ==
=== Club ===
As of match played 17 May 2026

Appearances and goals by club, season and competition
Club	Season	League			National cup (Note: Includes FA Cup, Coupe de France)		League cup (Note: Includes EFL Cup)		Europe		Other		Total	
Club	Season	Division	Apps	Goals	Apps	Goals	Apps	Goals	Apps	Goals	Apps	Goals	Apps	Goals
Dartford	2021–22	National League South	0	0	0	0	—		—		0	0	0	0
Margate (dual registration)	2021–22	Isthmian League	18	3	1	0	—		—		3 (Note: Two appearances in FA Trophy, one appearance in Kent Senior Cup)	0	22	3
Fulham U21	2023–24	—			—		—		—		1 (Note: Appearance in EFL Trophy)	1	1	1
Fulham U21	2024–25	—			—		—		—		1	1	1	1
Fulham U21	Total		—		—		—		—		2	2	2	2
Fulham	2021–22	Championship	0	0	0	0	0	0	—		—		0	0
Fulham	2022–23	Premier League	0	0	0	0	1	0	—		—		1	0
Fulham	2024–25	Premier League	2	0	2	0	1	0	—		—		5	0
Fulham	Total		2	0	2	0	2	0	—		—		6	0
Wigan Athletic (loan)	2023–24	League One	34	4	3	0	0	0	—		0	0	37	4
Strasbourg	2025–26	Ligue 1	28	10	5	2	—		11 (Note: Appearances in UEFA Conference League)	4	—		44	16
Career total			82	18	11	2	2	0	11	4	5	2	111	25

=== International ===
As of match played 28 March 2026

Appearances and goals by national team and year
National team	Year	Apps	Goals
Ivory Coast	2026	1	1
Total		1	1

Ivory Coast score listed first, score column indicates score after each Godo goal.

List of international goals scored by Martial Godo
No.	Date	Venue	Opponent	Score	Result	Competition
1	28 March 2026	Stadium MK, Milton Keynes, England	South Korea	3–0	4–0	Friendly

== Honours ==
Individual

- UEFA Conference League Team of the Season: 2025–26
