= Gessime Yassine =

Footballer (born 2005)

- Yassine with Morocco in 2026

Personal information
- Full name: Gessime Ben Youssef Mustapha Yassine
- Date of birth: 22 November 2005 (age 20)
- Place of birth: Salon-de-Provence, France
- Height: 1.72 m (5 ft 8 in)
- Position: Winger

Team information
- Current team: Strasbourg
- Number: 80

Youth career
- –2023: Istres
- 2023–2024: Marignane GCB

Senior career*
Years	Team	Apps	(Gls)
2022	Istres	2	(0)
2024–2026	Dunkerque	61	(7)
2026–	Strasbourg	21	(4)

International career^{‡}
2024–2026	Morocco U20	16	(4)
2026–	Morocco	9	(1)
Medal record
Men's football
Representing Morocco
FIFA U-20 World Cup
Winner	2025 Chile
- * Club domestic league appearances and goals as of 20:37, 4 November 2026 (UTC) ‡ National team caps and goals as of 5 October 2026

Gessime Ben Youssef Mustapha Yassine (born 22 November 2005) is a professional footballer who plays as a winger for Ligue 1 club Strasbourg. Born in France, he represents the Morocco national team.

== Club career ==
After playing for Istres and Marignane GCB, Yassine signed for Ligue 2 club Dunkerque in January 2024. He quickly established himself in the side's starting eleven, and was chosen as Dunkerque's player of the month in February and March. He was elected Ligue 2 young player of the month in February, and was nominated for Ligue 2 young player of the season.

On 17 January 2026, Yassine signed a four-and-a-half-year contract with Strasbourg.

== International career ==
In March 2024, Yassine received his first call-up to the Morocco U20s for two friendly matches against DR Congo.

On 26 May 2026, Yassine was selected in the 26-man squad for the 2026 FIFA World Cup. On 24 June, he scored his first World Cup goal in a 4–2 victory over Haiti, becoming the youngest Moroccan player ever to score at the FIFA World Cup, at 20 years and 214 days.

== Personal life ==
Born in France, Yassine is of Moroccan descent.

== Career statistics ==
=== Club ===
As of match played 1 November 2026

Appearances and goals by club, season and competition
Club	Season	League			Coupe de France		Europe		Other		Total	
Club	Season	Division	Apps	Goals	Apps	Goals	Apps	Goals	Apps	Goals	Apps	Goals
Istres	2021–22	National 3	2	0	—		—		—		2	0
Dunkerque	2023–24	Ligue 2	19	2	1	0	—		—		20	2
Dunkerque	2024–25	Ligue 2	29	3	6	0	—		2 (Note: Appearances in Ligue 1 relegation/promotion play-offs)	0	37	3
Dunkerque	2025–26	Ligue 2	13	2	2	1	—		—		15	3
Dunkerque	Total		61	7	9	1	—		2	0	72	8
Strasbourg	2025–26	Ligue 1	12	0	3	0	4 (Note: Appearances in UEFA Conference League)	0	—		18	0
Strasbourg	2026–27	Ligue 1	9	4	0	0	—		—		9	4
Strasbourg	Total		21	4	3	0	4	0	—		28	4
Career total			84	11	12	1	4	0	2	0	102	12

=== International ===
As of match played 4 October 2026

Appearances and goals by national team and year
National team	Year	Apps	Goals
Morocco	2026	9	1
Total		9	1

Scores and results list Morocco's goal tally first, score column indicates score after each Yassine goal.

List of international goals scored by Gessime Yassine
No.	Date	Venue	Cap	Opponent	Score	Result	Competition
1	24 June 2026	Mercedes-Benz Stadium, Atlanta, United States	5	Haiti	4–2	4–2	2026 FIFA World Cup

== Honours ==
Morocco U20

- FIFA U-20 World Cup: 2025
