= Rafael Luís =

Portuguese footballer (born 2005)

Personal information
- Full name: Rafael Filipe Gonçalves Soares Luís
- Date of birth: 18 February 2005 (age 21)
- Place of birth: Amadora, Portugal
- Height: 1.88 m (6 ft 2 in)
- Position: Defensive midfielder

Team information
- Current team: Gençlerbirliği
- Number: 83

Youth career
- 2010–2023: Benfica

Senior career*
Years	Team	Apps	(Gls)
2023–2025	Benfica B	53	(0)
2025–2026	Benfica	0	(0)
2025–2026	→ Strasbourg (loan)	12	(0)
2026–	Gençlerbirliği	5	(1)

International career^{‡}
2021	Portugal U16	1	(0)
2021–2022	Portugal U17	14	(0)
2023	Portugal U18	3	(1)
2023–2024	Portugal U19	11	(0)
2024–	Portugal U20	3	(0)
2025–	Portugal U21	1	(0)
- * Club domestic league appearances and goals as of 17 October 2026 ‡ National team caps and goals as of 01:01, 30 November 2025 (UTC)

Rafael Filipe Gonçalves Soares Luís (born 18 February 2005) is a Portuguese professional footballer who plays as a defensive midfielder for Turkish Süper Lig club Gençlerbirliği.

== Club career ==
Luís is a product of Benfica's youth academy since 2010 and worked his way up their youth categories, signing an academy contract with them on 27 February 2019. On 17 June 2022, he signed his first professional contract with Benfica,and was promoted to their reserves. On 5 September 2023, he renewed his contract with Benfica until 2028. He made the Benfica senior squad for the 2025 FIFA Club World Cup. On 17 August 2025, he joined Strasbourg on loan in the French Ligue 1 for the 2025–26 season.

On 4 September 2026, Luís signed a two-season contract with Gençlerbirliği in Turkey.

== International career ==
Luís was called up to the Portugal U17s for the 2022 UEFA European Under-17 Championship.

== Career statistics ==
As of match played 10 May 2026

Appearances and goals by club, season and competition
Club	Season	League			National cup		Europe		Other		Total	
Club	Season	Division	Apps	Goals	Apps	Goals	Apps	Goals	Apps	Goals	Apps	Goals
Benfica B	2023–24	Liga Portugal 2	23	0	—		—		—		23	0
Benfica B	2024–25	Liga Portugal 2	30	0	—		—		—		30	0
Benfica B	Total		53	0	—		—		—		53	0
Benfica	2024–25	Primeira Liga	0	0	0	0	0	0	0	0	0	0
Strasbourg (loan)	2025–26	Ligue 1	12	0	1	0	5 (Note: Appearances in UEFA Conference League)	0	—		18	0
Career total			65	0	1	0	5	0	0	0	71	0
