= Wilguens Paugain =

Haitian footballer (born 2001)

Personal information
- Full name: Wilguens Raphael Polynice Paugain
- Date of birth: 24 August 2001 (age 25)
- Place of birth: Thomazeau, Haiti
- Height: 1.80 m (5 ft 11 in)
- Position: Right-back

Team information
- Current team: Zulte Waregem
- Number: 12

Youth career
- 2007–2008: AS Nomexy Vincey
- 2008–2015: Épinal
- 2015–2019: Nancy

Senior career*
Years	Team	Apps	(Gls)
2019–2022	Nancy II	5	(0)
2022–2023	Akritas Chlorakas	21	(0)
2023–2024	FK Auda	21	(0)
2024–2025	SKN St. Pölten	14	(0)
2025	→ Zulte Waregem (loan)	3	(0)
2025–	Zulte Waregem	24	(1)

International career^{‡}
2018	France U18	2	(0)
2025–	Haiti	8	(0)
- * Club domestic league appearances and goals as of 11 May 2026 ‡ National team caps and goals as of 23:12, 5 June 2026 (UTC)

Wilguens Raphael Polynice Paugain (born 24 August 2001) is a Haitian professional football player who plays as right-back for Zulte Waregem. A former youth international for France, he plays for the Haiti national team.

== Club career ==
Paugain is a youth product of AS Nomexy Vincey and Épinal, before moving to Nancy's academy in 2015 where he finished his development. He debuted with their reserves in the Championnat National 3 in 2019. On 22 July 2022, he transferred to the Cypriot club Akritas Chlorakas. In 2023, he moved to the Latvian club FK Auda. On 31 July 2024, he transferred to the Belgian club Zulte Waregem until 2026. On 1 February 2025, he joined Zulte Waregem on loan for the second half of the 2024–25 season.

== International career ==
Born in Haiti, Paugain moved to France at a young age and is a dual-citizen. He played for the France U18s in friendlies in 2018. In March 2025, he was called up to the Haiti national team for a set of friendlies.

On 15 May 2026, he was included in Haiti head coach Sébastien Migné's 26-man squad for the 2026 FIFA World Cup.

== Career statistics ==
=== Club ===
As of match played 2 May 2026

Appearances and goals by club, season and competition
Club	Season	League			Cup		Europe		Other		Total	
Club	Season	Division	Apps	Goals	Apps	Goals	Apps	Goals	Apps	Goals	Apps	Goals
Nancy II	2018–19	National 3	1	0	—		—		—		1	0
Nancy II	2019–20	National 3	4	0	—		—		—		4	0
Nancy II	Total		5	0	—		—		—		5	0
Akritas Chlorakas	2022–23	Cypriot First Division	21	0	2	0	—		—		23	0
FK Auda	2023	Latvian Higher League	3	0	—		—		—		3	0
FK Auda	2024	Latvian Higher League	18	0	—		—		—		18	0
FK Auda	Total		21	0	—		—		—		21	0
SKN St. Pölten	2024–25	2. Liga	14	0	1	0	—		—		15	0
Zulte Waregem (loan)	2024–25	Challenger Pro League	3	0	—		—		—		3	0
Zulte Waregem	2025–26	Challenger Pro League	24	1	1	0	—		—		25	1
Career total			88	0	4	0	0	0	0	0	92	1

=== International ===
As of match played 5 June 2026

Appearances and goals by national team and year
National team	Year	Apps	Goals
Haiti	2025	4	0
Haiti	2026	4	0
Total		8	0
