= Tyrese Noubissie =

Footballer (born 2009)

Personal information
- Date of birth: 13 May 2009 (age 17)
- Place of birth: Livingston, Scotland
- Height: 1.88 m (6 ft 2 in)
- Position: Midfielder

Team information
- Current team: Strasbourg
- Number: 28

Youth career
- 2017–2023: Leicester City
- 2023–2025: Manchester City
- 2025–: Strasbourg

Senior career*
Years	Team	Apps	(Gls)
2025–	Strasbourg B	12	(0)
2025–	Strasbourg	4	(0)

International career^{‡}
2024	England U15	3	(0)
2025	France U16	8	(0)
2026–	France U17	2	(0)
2026–	England U18	3	(0)
- * Club domestic league appearances and goals as of 23:04, 17 May 2026 ‡ National team caps and goals as of 19:26, 27 September 2026 (UTC)

Tyrese Noubissie (born 13 May 2009) is a professional footballer who plays as a midfielder for Ligue 1 club Strasbourg. Born in Scotland, he has been selected by both England and France at youth international level.

== Early life ==
Noubissie was born in Livingston. He is of Cameroonian descent through his father, and Scottish descent through his mother. He is the son of French-born former footballer Patrick Noubissie.

== Club career ==
Noubissie started his career in the youth academy of Leicester City. Despite interest from various clubs including Manchester United, he signed for Manchester City in August 2023 for a transfer fee of £1 million.

On 22 August 2025, he joined French Ligue 1 club Strasbourg on a professional contract, signing a three-year deal. On 19 April 2026, Noubissie made his Ligue 1 debut for Strasbourg, coming off the bench in a 0–3 loss at home to Rennes.

== International career ==
Noubissie is eligible to play for France, Scotland, Cameroon and England. In November 2023, he was called up to the England under-15s. In February 2024, Noubissie made his international debut for England U15 in games against Scotland and Belgium.

On 28 February 2025, Noubissie made his debut for the France under-16s.

In September 2026, Noubissie was selected for England under-18. He captained the side on his debut at this level in a victory against Colombia in a UEFA Friendship Cup match.

== Career statistics ==
As of match played 17 May 2026

Appearances and goals by club, season and competition
Club	Season	League			Cup		Europe		Other		Total	
Club	Season	Division	Apps	Goals	Apps	Goals	Apps	Goals	Apps	Goals	Apps	Goals
Strasbourg B	2025–26	National 3	12	0	—		—		—		12	0
Strasbourg	2025–26	Ligue 1	4	0	—		—		—		4	0
Career total			16	0	0	0	0	0	0	0	16	0

== Honours ==
France U16

- Montaigu Tournament: 2025
