= Patrick Noubissie =

French footballer (born 1983)

Personal information
- Full name: Patrick Benjamin Noubissie Youmbi
- Date of birth: 25 June 1983 (age 43)
- Place of birth: Bois-Colombes, France
- Height: 1.80 m (5 ft 11 in)
- Position: Midfielder

Team information
- Current team: Morecambe (Head of Recruitment)

Senior career*
Years	Team	Apps	(Gls)
2001–2006	Sedan	32	(0)
2004–2005	→ US Roye (loan)	30	(0)
2006–2007	Crewe Alexandra	0	(0)
2007	Swindon Town	23	(0)
2007–2008	Hibernian	4	(0)
2007	→ Livingston (loan)	7	(0)
2008	→ Dundee (loan)	9	(0)
2008–2009	Ayia Napa	15	(0)
2009–2012	Kettering Town	104	(1)
2012	Droylsden	0	(0)
2013	Kettering Town	1	(0)
2014	Harborough Town	3	(0)
- * Club domestic league appearances and goals

Patrick Benjamin Noubissie Youmbi (born 25 June 1983) is a French former professional footballer who played as a midfielder. After his football career, he became a physiotherapist. He is currently Head of Recruitment at Morecambe.

== Playing career ==
Noubissie has played for French sides CS Brétigny sur Orge, Le Mée sur Seine S.C., CS Sedan Ardennes and US Roye Foot Picardie 80 before signing for English teams Crewe Alexandra and Swindon Town.

In August 2007, Noubissie signed a two-year contract with Hibernian. Noubissie was then immediately loaned to Livingston for three months to build up his match fitness. He returned to Easter Road in November 2007 and made a few appearances for Hibs, but he then fell out of favour after manager John Collins resigned.

Noubissie was subsequently loaned out to Dundee on 4 March 2008 as an emergency loan. At the end of the season, Noubissie was released by Hibs.

In July 2009, he trained and played in pre-season friendlies for English Conference National side Kettering Town, with the club's manager Mark Cooper aiming to agree a deal for the midfielder.

In August 2009, he joined Kettering after gaining international clearance from the Cypriot FA. and made his debut in the 1–1 draw against local rivals Oxford United After a short stint at Droylsden F.C., played for non-league sides Harborough Town F.C. and Sunday football club Guru Nanak Gurdwara

== Physiotherapy career ==
Due to a long-standing hip injury and multiple surgeries, Patrick was forced to retire from football aged 28 while playing for Kettering Town in the conference at the end of the season 2011/2012.

He trained as a physiotherapist at Coventry University where he graduated with a Bachelor of Science degree in physiotherapy and Master of Science degree in Manual Therapy.

Patrick Firstly took a position as assistant First team physiotherapist at Northamptonshire County Cricket Club assisting Barry Goudriaan, the Head of Sports and Exercise Medicine.

He then moved on to join Leicester City Football Club as an Academy Physiotherapist.

On 1 September 2018, with the appointment of Dutch duo Clarence Seedorf and Patrick Kluivert respectively named Cameroon National Team Head coach and assistant coach, Patrick was appointed as Cameroon National team Physiotherapist.

== Personal life ==
Born in France, Noubissie is of Cameroonian descent. His son, Tyrese Noubissie, is also a footballer.
