= Samir El Mourabet =

Footballer (born 2006)

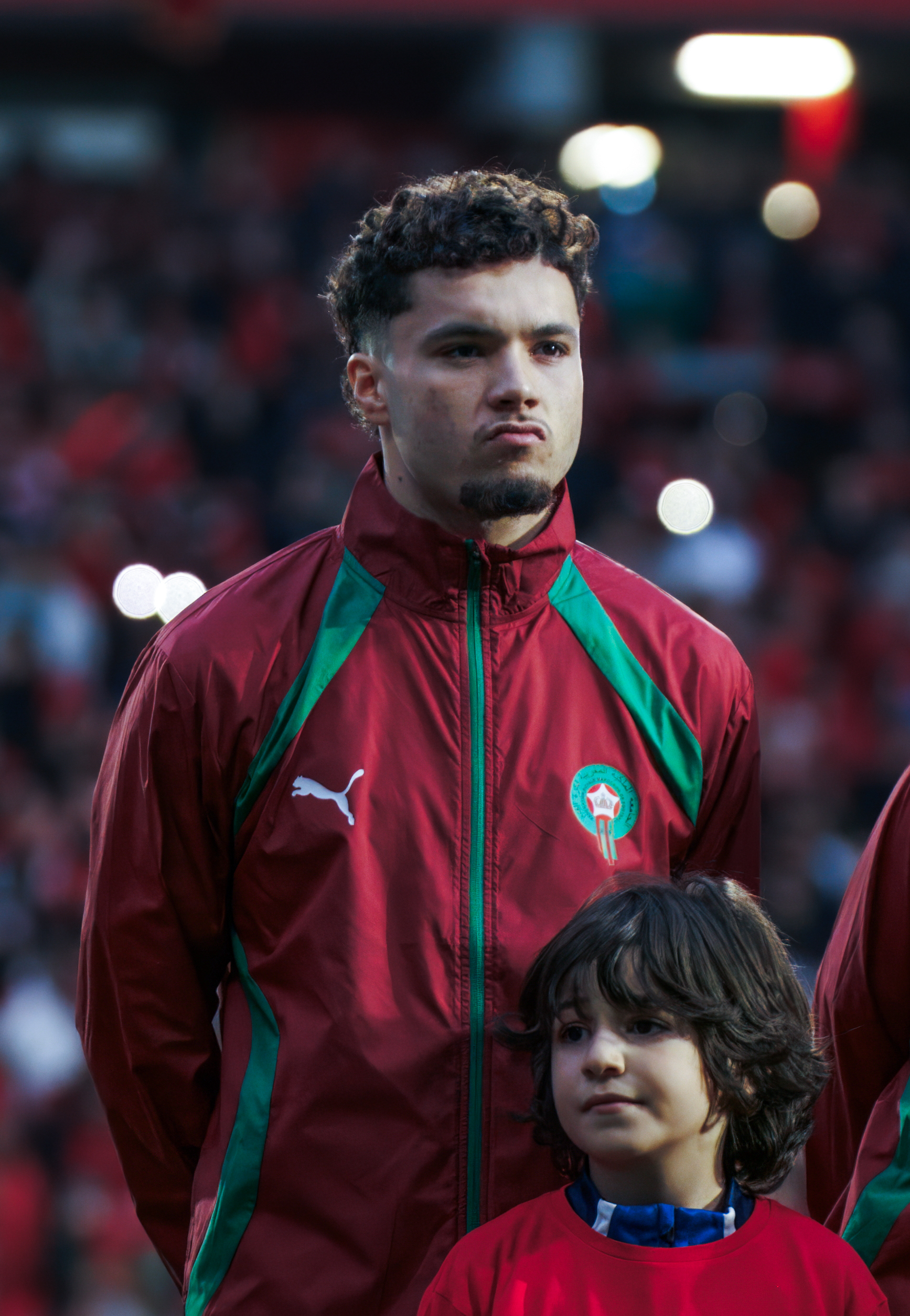
- El Mourabet with Morocco in 2026

Personal information
- Date of birth: 6 October 2005 (age 21)
- Place of birth: Strasbourg, France
- Height: 1.86 m (6 ft 1 in)
- Position: Defensive midfielder

Team information
- Current team: Strasbourg
- Number: 29

Youth career
- Strasbourg
- 2021–2022: ASPV Strasbourg
- 2022–2023: Strasbourg

Senior career*
Years	Team	Apps	(Gls)
2023–2025	Strasbourg II	37	(2)
2024–	Strasbourg	38	(1)

International career^{‡}
2023–2026	Morocco U20	9	(0)
2026–	Morocco	9	(0)
- * Club domestic league appearances and goals as of 19:14, 17 October 2026 (UTC) ‡ National team caps and goals as of 19:30, 4 July 2026 (UTC)

Samir El Mourabet (Arabic: سمير المرابط, romanized: Samīr al-Murābiṭ; born 6 October 2005) is a professional football player who plays as a defensive midfielder for Ligue 1 club Strasbourg. Born in France, he represents the Morocco national team.

== Club career ==
El Mourabet joined the youth academy of Strasbourg as a youth, before switching to futsal with Lyon Futsal, returning to Strasbourg in 2022. On 6 January 2024, he made his senior and professional debut with Strasbourg in a 4–0 Coupe de France win over Avoine OCC. On 27 May 2024, he signed his first professional contract with Strasbourg until 2027.

== International career ==
Born in France, El Mourabet is of Moroccan descent. He played for the France Futsal U19s in 2022. He is a youth international for Morocco, having played for the Morocco U20s starting in 2023.

On 26 May 2026, El Mourabet was selected in the 26-man squad for the 2026 FIFA World Cup.

== Career statistics ==
=== Club ===
As of match played 17 October 2026

Appearances and goals by club, season and competition
Club	Season	League			National cup		Europe		Other		Total	
Club	Season	Division	Apps	Goals	Apps	Goals	Apps	Goals	Apps	Goals	Apps	Goals
Strasbourg II	2022–23	National 3	5	0	—		—		—		5	0
Strasbourg II	2023–24	National 3	23	1	—		—		—		23	1
Strasbourg II	2024–25	National 3	9	1	—		—		—		9	1
Strasbourg II	Total		37	2	—		—		—		37	2
Strasbourg	2023–24	Ligue 1	0	0	1	0	—		—		1	0
Strasbourg	2024–25	Ligue 1	0	0	1	0	—		—		1	0
Strasbourg	2025–26	Ligue 1	33	1	5	0	10 (Note: Appearances in UEFA Conference League)	1	—		48	2
Strasbourg	2026–27	Ligue 1	5	0	0	0	—		—		5	0
Strasbourg	Total		38	1	7	0	10	1	—		55	2
Career total			75	3	7	0	10	1	0	0	92	4

=== International ===
As of match played 4 July 2026

Appearances and goals by national team and year
National team	Year	Apps	Goals
Morocco	2026	9	0
Total		9	0
