= Antoine Mendy =

Antoine Mendy may refer to:

- Antoine Mendy (basketball) (born 1983), Senegalese basketball player
- Antoine Mendy (footballer) (born 2004), Senegalese footballer
