= Martin Expérience =

Haitian footballer (born 1999)

Personal information
- Full name: Martin Yves Experiénce
- Date of birth: 9 March 1999 (age 27)
- Place of birth: Châteaubriant, France
- Height: 1.78 m (5 ft 10 in)
- Position: Left-back

Team information
- Current team: Dender EH
- Number: 23

Youth career
- 2017–2018: Xerez

Senior career*
Years	Team	Apps	(Gls)
2018–2020	Changé	18	(0)
2020	Avranches II	3	(2)
2020–2022	Avranches	29	(1)
2022–2024	Cholet	54	(3)
2024–2026	Nancy	49	(1)
2026–	Dender EH	6	(0)

International career^{‡}
2021	Haiti U23	1	(0)
2021–	Haiti	27	(0)
- * Club domestic league appearances and goals as of 20 September 2026 ‡ National team caps and goals as of 23:13, 1 October 2026 (UTC)

Martin Yves Expérience (born 9 March 1999) is a professional footballer who plays as a left-back for Challenger Pro League club Dender EH in Belgium. Born in France, he plays for the Haiti national team.

== Club career ==
A youth product of Xerez, Expérience began his senior career with Changé in 2018. After a couple of seasons there, he moved to Avranches in 2020. In June 2022, he signed with Cholet.

On 31 May 2024, Expérience joined Championnat National club Nancy.

== International career ==
Expérience debuted with the Haiti national team in a 6–1 2021 CONCACAF Gold Cup qualification win over Saint Vincent and the Grenadines on 2 July 2021.

On 15 May 2026, he was included in Haiti head coach Sébastien Migné's 26-man squad for the 2026 FIFA World Cup.

== Career statistics ==
=== Club ===
As of match played 20 September 2026

Appearances and goals by club, season and competition
Club	Season	League			Cup		Other		Total	
Club	Season	Division	Apps	Goals	Apps	Goals	Apps	Goals	Apps	Goals
Changé	2018–19	National 3	1	0	—		—		1	0
Changé	2019–20	National 3	17	0	—		—		17	0
Changé	Total		18	0	—		—		18	0
Avranches II	2020–21	National 3	3	2	—		—		3	2
Avranches	2020–21	Ligue 3	17	1	0	0	—		17	1
Avranches	2021–22	Ligue 3	12	0	1	0	—		13	0
Avranches	Total		29	1	1	0	—		30	1
Cholet	2022–23	Ligue 3	31	1	3	0	—		34	1
Cholet	2023–24	Ligue 3	23	2	1	0	—		24	2
Cholet	Total		54	3	4	0	—		58	3
Nancy	2024–25	Ligue 3	29	0	—		—		29	0
Nancy	2025–26	Ligue 2	20	1	3	0	—		23	1
Nancy	Total		49	1	3	0	—		52	1
Dender	2026–27	Challenger Pro League	6	0	0	0	—		6	0
Career total			147	7	7	0	0	0	154	7

=== International ===
As of match played 1 October 2026

Appearances and goals by national team and year
National team	Year	Apps	Goals
Haiti	2021	4	0
Haiti	2023	1	0
Haiti	2024	4	0
Haiti	2025	8	0
Haiti	2026	10	0
Total		27	0

== Honours ==
Nancy

- Championnat National: 2024–25
