= Sébastien Migné =

French football coach and former player (born 1972)

Personal information
- Full name: Sébastien Bernard Henri Clément Migné
- Date of birth: 30 November 1972 (age 53)
- Place of birth: La Roche-sur-Yon, France
- Height: 1.73 m (5 ft 8 in)
- Position: Midfielder

Senior career*
| Years | Team | Apps | (Gls) |
| 1989–1993 | La Roche VF | | |
| 1994–1996 | Stade Vallauris | | |
| 1996 | Hoxton | | |
| 1997 | Boreham Wood | | |
| 1997–1998 | Leyton Orient | | |
| 2000–2002 | FC Gaillard | | |

Managerial career
- 1998–2000: FC Mougins
- 2005–2006: La Roche VF
- 2013: DR Congo U20
- 2017–2018: Congo
- 2018–2019: Kenya
- 2019–2020: Equatorial Guinea
- 2021: Marumo Gallants
- 2024–2026: Haiti
- 2026–: Gabon
- * Club domestic league appearances and goals

Sébastien Bernard Henri Clément Migné (French pronunciation: [sebastjɛ̃ miɲe]; born 30 November 1972) is a French professional football former player, who is currently the head coach of the Gabon national team.

== Managerial career ==
Migné was previously coach of the DR Congo national under-20 team. He was the first coach to qualify the team for the continental championships.

Migné was appointed coach of the Congo national team in March 2017. He left in March 2018.

On 3 May 2018, Migné was named the new coach of the Kenya national team. Under Migné Kenya was nominated for the CAF Men's national team of the year award in 2018, for the first time in history. He left in August 2019.

On 7 November 2019, he was announced as coach of the Equatorial Guinea national team.

He was dismissed by Marumo Gallants shortly before the club's second round 2021–22 CAF Confederation Cup game against AS Vita Club after the team had failed to win any of their first five league games, scoring only one goal, and after he had apparently directed abusive language at the club's technical director, Harris Choeu.

On 28 February 2022, Migné joined the Cameroon national team coaching staff as an assistant to head coach Rigobert Song. He resigned from his position in February 2024.

In June 2024 he became Head Coach of the Haiti national team. Following a 2–0 victory over Nicaragua in November 2025, Migné led Haiti to qualify for the 2026 FIFA World Cup, their second ever World Cup appearance. He did this despite having never set foot in the country due to the ongoing conflict.

On July 15, 2026, Migné resigned from Haiti and was announced as the new head coach of the Gabon national team.

== Managerial statistics ==
As of match played 17 November 2026

Managerial record by team and tenure
| Team | Nat. | From | To | Record | | | | | Ref. |
| Team | Nat. | From | To | G | W | D | L | Win % | Ref. |
|---|---|---|---|---|---|---|---|---|---|
| Congo | (Republic of the Congo) | 6 March 2017 | 29 March 2018 | 7 | 0 | 4 | 3 | 0.00 | |
| Kenya | (Kenya) | 3 May 2018 | 12 August 2019 | 16 | 8 | 2 | 6 | 50.00 | |
| Equatorial Guinea | (Equatorial Guinea) | 7 November 2019 | 4 June 2020 | 2 | 0 | 0 | 2 | 0.00 | |
| Marumo Gallants | (South Africa) | 15 July 2021 | 10 October 2021 | 5 | 0 | 2 | 3 | 0.00 | |
| Haiti | (Haiti) | 8 March 2024 | 15 July 2026 | 27 | 13 | 5 | 9 | 48.15 | |
| Gabon | (Gabon) | 15 July 2026 | Present | 4 | 2 | 0 | 2 | 50.00 | |
| Career Total | | | | 61 | 23 | 13 | 25 | 37.70 | |
