= Football at the 2004 Summer Olympics – Men's team squads =

The following is a list of squads for each nation competing in men's football at the 2004 Summer Olympics in Athens. Each nation must submit a squad of 18 players, 15 of whom must be born on or after 1 January 1981, and three of whom can be older dispensation players.

== Group A ==
=== Greece ===
The following is the Greek squad in the men's football tournament of the 2004 Summer Olympics.

Head coach: Stratos Apostolakis

No.	Pos.	Player	Date of birth (age)	Caps	Goals	2004 club
1	GK	Georgios Ambaris	23 April 1982 (aged 22)	2	0	(Hellenic Football Federation) Iraklis
2	DF	Aris Galanopoulos	13 September 1981 (aged 22)	1	0	(Hellenic Football Federation) Kalamata
3	MF	Panagiotis Lagos	18 July 1985 (aged 19)	3	0	(Hellenic Football Federation) Iraklis
4	DF	Evangelos Moras	26 August 1981 (aged 22)	3	0	(Hellenic Football Federation) AEK Athens
5	DF	Spyros Vallas	26 August 1981 (aged 22)	3	0	(Hellenic Football Federation) Olympiacos
6	MF	Ieroklis Stoltidis*	2 February 1975 (aged 29)	3	1	(Hellenic Football Federation) Olympiacos
7	FW	Anestis Agritis	16 April 1981 (aged 23)	1	0	(Hellenic Football Federation) Egaleo
8	MF	Konstantinos Nebegleras*	14 April 1975 (aged 29)	3	0	(Hellenic Football Federation) Iraklis
9	FW	Dimitris Salpingidis	18 August 1981 (aged 22)	3	0	(Hellenic Football Federation) PAOK
10	FW	Nikolaos Mitrou	10 July 1983 (aged 21)	2	0	(Hellenic Football Federation) Panionios
11	FW	Dimitrios Papadopoulos	20 October 1981 (aged 22)	3	1	(Hellenic Football Federation) Panathinaikos
12	DF	Christos Karypidis	2 December 1982 (aged 21)	0	0	(Hellenic Football Federation) PAOK
13	MF	Fanouris Goundoulakis	13 July 1981 (aged 23)	0	0	(Hellenic Football Federation) Panionios
14	MF	Georgios Fotakis	29 October 1981 (aged 22)	1	0	(Hellenic Football Federation) Egaleo
15	MF	Miltiadis Sapanis*	28 January 1976 (aged 28)	3	0	(Hellenic Football Federation) Panathinaikos
16	DF	Loukas Vyntra	5 February 1981 (aged 23)	3	0	(Hellenic Football Federation) Panathinaikos
17	MF	Giannis Taralidis	17 May 1981 (aged 23)	3	2	(Hellenic Football Federation) Olympiacos
18	GK	Kleopas Giannou	4 May 1982 (aged 22)	1	0	(Hellenic Football Federation) Olympiacos

* Over-aged player.

=== Mali ===
The following is the Malian squad in the men's football tournament of the 2004 Summer Olympics.

Head coach: Cheick Oumar Koné

No.	Pos.	Player	Date of birth (age)	Caps	Goals	2004 club
1	GK	Fousseiny Tangara*	12 June 1978 (aged 26)	0	0	(French Football Federation) FC Mantes
2	FW	Mamadi Berthe	17 January 1983 (aged 21)	0	0	(French Football Federation) Sedan
3	DF	Adama Tamboura	18 May 1985 (aged 19)	0	0	(Malian Football Federation) Djoliba AC
4	DF	Moussa Coulibaly	15 September 1981 (aged 22)	0	0	(Malian Football Federation) AS Bamako
5	DF	Boubacar Koné	21 August 1984 (aged 19)	0	0	(Malian Football Federation) AS Bamako
6	DF	Boucader Diallo	14 September 1984 (aged 19)	0	0	(Malian Football Federation) Stade Malien
7	FW	Tenema N'Diaye	13 February 1981 (aged 23)	0	0	(Tunisian Football Federation) CS Sfaxien
8	MF	Abdou Traore	5 August 1981 (aged 23)	0	0	(Malian Football Federation) Djoliba AC
9	MF	Rafan Sidibé	12 March 1984 (aged 20)	0	0	(Malian Football Federation) Stade Malien
10	MF	Mintou Doucouré	19 July 1982 (aged 22)	0	0	(Malian Football Federation) JS Centre Setif Keita
11	FW	Sédonoudé Abouta	1 January 1981 (aged 23)	0	0	(Malian Football Federation) Djoliba AC
12	DF	Drissa Diakité	18 February 1985 (aged 19)	0	0	(Malian Football Federation) Djoliba AC
13	FW	Dramane Traoré	17 June 1982 (aged 22)	0	0	(Egyptian Football Association) Ismaily SC
14	MF	Mohamed Sissoko	22 January 1985 (aged 19)	0	0	(Royal Spanish Football Federation) Valencia
15	MF	Jimmy Kébé	19 January 1984 (aged 20)	0	0	(French Football Federation) Lens
16	GK	Soumbeïla Diakité	25 August 1984 (aged 19)	0	0	(Malian Football Federation) Stade Malien
17	FW	Mamadou Diallo	17 April 1982 (aged 22)	0	0	(Algerian Football Federation) USM Alger
18	GK	Cheick Bathily	10 October 1982 (aged 21)	0	0	(Malian Football Federation) Djoliba AC

* Over-aged player.

=== Mexico ===
The following is the Mexican squad in the men's football tournament of the 2004 Summer Olympics.

Head coach: (Argentina) Ricardo La Volpe

No.	Pos.	Player	Date of birth (age)	Caps	Goals	2004 club
1	GK	José de Jesús Corona	26 January 1981 (aged 23)	5	0	(Mexican Football Federation) Tecos UAG
2	DF	Francisco Rodríguez	20 October 1981 (aged 22)	5	0	(Mexican Football Federation) Chivas
3	DF	Mario Pérez	17 June 1982 (aged 22)	5	0	(Mexican Football Federation) Necaxa
4	DF	Ismael Rodríguez	10 January 1981 (aged 23)	2	0	(Mexican Football Federation) Monterrey
5	MF	Israel López*	29 September 1974 (aged 29)	0	0	(Mexican Football Federation) Club Toluca
6	DF	Aarón Galindo	8 May 1982 (aged 22)	5	0	(Mexican Football Federation) Cruz Azul
7	MF	Sinha*	23 May 1976 (aged 28)	0	0	(Mexican Football Federation) Club Toluca
8	DF	Diego Martínez	15 February 1981 (aged 23)	5	3	(Mexican Football Federation) Necaxa
9	FW	Omar Bravo*	4 March 1980 (aged 24)	0	0	(Mexican Football Federation) Chivas
10	MF	Luis Ernesto Pérez	12 January 1981 (aged 23)	5	2	(Mexican Football Federation) Monterrey
11	FW	Rafael Márquez Lugo	2 November 1981 (aged 22)	5	3	(Mexican Football Federation) Morelia
12	DF	Gonzalo Pineda	19 October 1982 (aged 21)	3	0	(Mexican Football Federation) Pumas UNAM
13	FW	Sergio Amaury Ponce	13 August 1981 (aged 23)	3	0	(Mexican Football Federation) Club Toluca
14	FW	Juan Pablo García	24 November 1981 (aged 22)	3	1	(Mexican Football Federation) Atlas
15	DF	Hugo Sánchez Guerrero	8 August 1981 (aged 23)	2	0	(Mexican Football Federation) UANL Tigres
16	MF	Ismael Íñiguez	23 July 1981 (aged 23)	3	1	(Mexican Football Federation) Pumas UNAM
17	MF	Gerardo Espinoza	3 October 1981 (aged 22)	5	0	(Mexican Football Federation) Dorados
18	GK	Guillermo Ochoa	13 July 1985 (aged 19)	0	0	(Mexican Football Federation) Club América

* Over-aged player.

=== South Korea ===
The following is the South Korean squad in the men's football tournament of the 2004 Summer Olympics.

Head coach: Kim Ho-kon

No.	Pos.	Player	Date of birth (age)	Caps	Goals	2004 club
1	GK	Kim Young-kwang	28 June 1983 (aged 21)	18	0	(Korea Football Association) Jeonnam Dragons
2	DF	Choi Won-kwon	8 November 1981 (aged 22)	22	0	(Korea Football Association) FC Seoul
3	DF	Kim Chi-gon	29 July 1983 (aged 21)	11	0	(Korea Football Association) FC Seoul
4	DF	Park Yong-ho	25 March 1981 (aged 23)	19	1	(Korea Football Association) FC Seoul
5	DF	Cho Byung-kuk	1 July 1981 (aged 23)	22	0	(Korea Football Association) Suwon Samsung Bluewings
6	MF	Yoo Sang-chul*	18 October 1971 (aged 32)	0	0	(Japan Football Association) Yokohama F. Marinos
7	MF	Kim Do-heon	14 July 1982 (aged 22)	23	2	(Korea Football Association) Suwon Samsung Bluewings
8	FW	Chung Kyung-ho*	22 May 1980 (aged 24)	0	0	(Korea Football Association) Ulsan Hyundai Horangi
9	FW	Lee Chun-soo	9 July 1981 (aged 23)	3	1	(Royal Spanish Football Federation) Real Sociedad
10	FW	Choi Sung-kuk	8 February 1983 (aged 21)	21	2	(Korea Football Association) Ulsan Hyundai Horangi
11	FW	Choi Tae-uk	13 March 1981 (aged 23)	22	10	(Korea Football Association) Incheon United
12	MF	Park Kyu-seon	24 September 1981 (aged 22)	18	0	(Korea Football Association) Jeonbuk Hyundai Motors
13	MF	Kim Dong-jin	29 January 1982 (aged 22)	23	3	(Korea Football Association) FC Seoul
14	MF	Kim Jung-woo	9 May 1982 (aged 22)	20	1	(Korea Football Association) Ulsan Hyundai Horangi
15	DF	Lee Jung-youl	16 August 1981 (aged 22)	5	0	(Korea Football Association) FC Seoul
16	FW	Namkung Do	4 June 1982 (aged 22)	9	0	(Korea Football Association) Jeonbuk Hyundai Motors
17	FW	Cho Jae-jin	9 July 1981 (aged 23)	22	7	(Japan Football Association) Shimizu S-Pulse
18	GK	Kim Jee-hyuk	26 October 1981 (aged 22)	3	0	(Korea Football Association) Busan I'Cons

* Over-aged player.

== Group B ==
=== Ghana ===
The following is the Ghanaian squad in the men's football tournament of the 2004 Summer Olympics.

Head coach: (Portugal) Mariano Barreto

No.	Pos.	Player	Date of birth (age)	Caps	Goals	2004 club
1	GK	George Owu	17 June 1982 (aged 22)	0	0	(Ghana Football Association) Asante Kotoko
2	MF	Nasir Lamine	7 February 1985 (aged 19)	0	0	(Ghana Football Association) Ashanti Gold
3	FW	Baffour Gyan*	2 July 1980 (aged 24)	0	0	(Russian Football Union) Dynamo Moscow
4	DF	Emmanuel Osei	23 May 1982 (aged 22)	0	0	(Turkish Football Federation) Akçaabat Sebatspor
5	DF	John Mensah	29 November 1982 (aged 21)	0	0	(Italian Football Federation) Chievo Verona
6	DF	Emmanuel Pappoe	3 March 1981 (aged 23)	0	0	(Israel Football Association) F.C. Ashdod
7	MF	Abubakari Yahuza	8 August 1983 (aged 21)	0	0	(Ghana Football Association) King Faisal Babes
8	FW	Charles Asampong Taylor	17 June 1981 (aged 23)	0	0	(Ghana Football Association) Asante Kotoko
9	FW	Kwadwo Poku	5 May 1985 (aged 19)	0	0	(Danish Football Association) Midtjylland
10	MF	Stephen Appiah	24 December 1980 (aged 23)	0	0	(Italian Football Federation) Juventus
11	DF	Patrick Villars	21 May 1984 (aged 20)	0	0	(Israel Football Association) Maccabi Petah Tikva
12	FW	Asamoah Gyan	22 November 1985 (aged 18)	0	0	(Italian Football Federation) Udinese
13	MF	Razak Pimpong	30 December 1982 (aged 21)	0	0	(Danish Football Association) Midtjylland
14	DF	John Paintsil	15 June 1981 (aged 23)	0	0	(Israel Football Association) Maccabi Tel Aviv
15	DF	Daniel Coleman	1 January 1984 (aged 20)	0	0	(Ghana Football Association) Hearts of Oak
16	FW	William Kwabena Tiero	3 December 1980 (aged 23)	0	0	(Ghana Football Association) Asante Kotoko
17	MF	Yussif Chibsah	30 December 1983 (aged 20)	0	0	(Ghana Football Association) Asante Kotoko
18	GK	Mohammed Alhassan	9 January 1984 (aged 20)	0	0	(Ghana Football Association) Asante Kotoko

* Over-aged player.

=== Italy ===
The following is the Italian squad in the men's football tournament of the 2004 Summer Olympics.

Head coach: Claudio Gentile

No.	Pos.	Player	Date of birth (age)	Caps	Goals	2004 club
1	GK	Marco Amelia	2 April 1982 (aged 22)	20	0	(Italian Football Federation) Livorno
2	DF	Giorgio Chiellini	14 August 1984 (aged 19)	7	1	(Italian Football Federation) Livorno
3	DF	Emiliano Moretti	11 June 1981 (aged 23)	21	0	(Italian Football Federation) Parma
4	DF	Matteo Ferrari*	5 December 1979 (aged 24)	60	0	(Italian Football Federation) Parma
5	DF	Daniele Bonera	31 May 1981 (aged 23)	32	0	(Italian Football Federation) Parma
6	MF	Daniele De Rossi	24 July 1983 (aged 21)	12	2	(Italian Football Federation) Roma
7	MF	Giampiero Pinzi	11 March 1981 (aged 23)	30	2	(Italian Football Federation) Udinese
8	MF	Angelo Palombo	25 September 1981 (aged 22)	17	0	(Italian Football Federation) Sampdoria
9	FW	Alberto Gilardino	5 July 1982 (aged 22)	37	15	(Italian Football Federation) Parma
10	MF	Andrea Pirlo*	19 May 1979 (aged 25)	59	17	(Italian Football Federation) AC Milan
11	FW	Giuseppe Sculli	23 March 1981 (aged 23)	20	9	(Italian Football Federation) Juventus
12	MF	Andrea Gasbarroni	6 August 1981 (aged 23)	10	2	(Italian Football Federation) Juventus
13	DF	Andrea Barzagli	8 May 1981 (aged 23)	11	0	(Italian Football Federation) Palermo
14	DF	Cesare Bovo	14 January 1983 (aged 21)	9	1	(Italian Football Federation) Roma
15	MF	Marco Donadel	21 April 1983 (aged 21)	9	0	(Italian Football Federation) AC Milan
16	FW	Simone Del Nero	4 August 1981 (aged 23)	8	0	(Italian Football Federation) Brescia
17	DF	Giandomenico Mesto	25 May 1982 (aged 22)	7	0	(Italian Football Federation) Reggina
18	GK	Ivan Pelizzoli*	18 November 1980 (aged 23)	19	0	(Italian Football Federation) Roma

* Over-aged player.

=== Japan ===
The following is the Japanese squad in the men's football tournament of the 2004 Summer Olympics.

Head coach: Masakuni Yamamoto

No.	Pos.	Player	Date of birth (age)	Caps	Goals	2004 club
1	GK	Hitoshi Sogahata*	2 August 1979 (aged 25)	4	0	(Japan Football Association) Kashima Antlers
2	DF	Marcus Tulio Tanaka	24 April 1981 (aged 23)	0	0	(Japan Football Association) Urawa Red Diamonds
3	DF	Teruyuki Moniwa	8 September 1981 (aged 22)	3	0	(Japan Football Association) FC Tokyo
4	DF	Daisuke Nasu	10 October 1981 (aged 22)	0	0	(Japan Football Association) Yokohama F. Marinos
5	MF	Yuki Abe	6 September 1981 (aged 22)	0	0	(Japan Football Association) JEF United Ichihara
6	MF	Yasuyuki Konno	25 January 1983 (aged 21)	0	0	(Japan Football Association) FC Tokyo
7	MF	Kōji Morisaki	9 May 1981 (aged 23)	0	0	(Japan Football Association) Sanfrecce Hiroshima
8	MF	Shinji Ono*	27 September 1979 (aged 24)	42	4	(Royal Dutch Football Association) Feyenoord
9	FW	Daiki Takamatsu	8 September 1981 (aged 22)	0	0	(Japan Football Association) Oita Trinita
10	MF	Daisuke Matsui	11 May 1981 (aged 23)	1	0	(Japan Football Association) Kyoto Purple Sanga
11	FW	Tatsuya Tanaka	27 November 1982 (aged 21)	0	0	(Japan Football Association) Urawa Red Diamonds
12	DF	Naoya Kikuchi	24 November 1984 (aged 19)	0	0	(Japan Football Association) Júbilo Iwata
13	MF	Yūichi Komano	25 June 1981 (aged 23)	0	0	(Japan Football Association) Sanfrecce Hiroshima
14	MF	Naohiro Ishikawa	12 May 1981 (aged 23)	2	0	(Japan Football Association) FC Tokyo
15	DF	Yūhei Tokunaga	25 September 1983 (aged 20)	0	0	(Japan Football Association) Waseda University
16	FW	Yoshito Ōkubo	9 June 1982 (aged 22)	15	0	(Japan Football Association) Cerezo Osaka
17	FW	Sōta Hirayama	6 June 1985 (aged 19)	0	0	(Japan Football Association) University of Tsukuba
18	GK	Takaya Kurokawa	7 April 1981 (aged 23)	0	0	(Japan Football Association) Shimizu S-Pulse

* Over-aged player.

=== Paraguay ===
The following is the Paraguayan squad in the men's football tournament of the 2004 Summer Olympics.

Head coach: Carlos Jara Saguier

No.	Pos.	Player	Date of birth (age)	Caps	Goals	2004 club
1	GK	Rodrigo Romero	8 November 1982 (aged 21)	0	0	(Paraguayan Football Association) Nacional Asunción
2	DF	Emilio Martinez	10 April 1981 (aged 23)	8	0	(Paraguayan Football Association) Libertad
3	DF	Julio Manzur	22 June 1981 (aged 23)	8	0	(Paraguayan Football Association) Guaraní
4	DF	Carlos Gamarra*	17 February 1971 (aged 33)	11	5	(Italian Football Federation) Inter Milan
5	DF	José Devaca	18 September 1982 (aged 21)	8	1	(Paraguayan Football Association) Cerro Porteño
6	DF	Celso Esquivel	20 March 1981 (aged 23)	0	0	(Argentine Football Association) San Lorenzo
7	FW	Pablo Giménez	29 June 1981 (aged 23)	8	1	(Paraguayan Football Association) Guaraní
8	MF	Edgar Barreto	15 July 1984 (aged 20)	8	0	(Royal Dutch Football Association) NEC Nijmegen
9	FW	Fredy Barreiro	27 March 1982 (aged 22)	8	2	(Paraguayan Football Association) Libertad
10	MF	Diego Figueredo	28 April 1982 (aged 22)	8	2	(Royal Spanish Football Federation) Real Valladolid
11	DF	Aureliano Torres	16 June 1982 (aged 22)	8	1	(Paraguayan Football Association) Guaraní
12	DF	Pedro Benitez	23 March 1981 (aged 23)	0	0	(Paraguayan Football Association) Cerro Porteño
13	MF	Julio César Enciso*	5 August 1974 (aged 30)	0	0	(Paraguayan Football Association) Olimpia Asunción
14	FW	Julio González	26 August 1981 (aged 22)	8	2	(Paraguayan Football Association) Nacional Asunción
15	DF	Ernesto Cristaldo	16 March 1984 (aged 20)	0	0	(Paraguayan Football Association) Cerro Porteño
16	MF	Osvaldo Diaz	22 December 1981 (aged 22)	8	1	(Paraguayan Football Association) Guaraní
17	FW	José Cardozo*	14 March 1971 (aged 33)	6	2	(Mexican Football Federation) Toluca
18	GK	Diego Barreto	16 July 1981 (aged 23)	8	0	(Paraguayan Football Association) Cerro Porteño

* Over-aged player.

== Group C ==
=== Argentina ===
The following is the Argentine squad in the men's football tournament of the 2004 Summer Olympics.

Head coach: Marcelo Bielsa

No.	Pos.	Player	Date of birth (age)	Caps	Goals	2004 club
1	GK	Willy Caballero	28 September 1981 (aged 22)	8	0	(Argentine Football Association) Boca Juniors
2	DF	Roberto Ayala*	14 April 1973 (aged 31)	90	5	(Royal Spanish Football Federation) Valencia
3	DF	Nicolás Burdisso	12 April 1981 (aged 23)	10	0	(Italian Football Federation) Inter Milan
4	DF	Fabricio Coloccini	22 January 1982 (aged 22)	7	0	(Italian Football Federation) Milan
5	MF	Javier Mascherano	8 June 1984 (aged 20)	13	0	(Argentine Football Association) River Plate
6	DF	Gabriel Heinze*	19 April 1978 (aged 26)	13	0	(The Football Association) Manchester United
7	FW	Javier Saviola	11 December 1981 (aged 22)	18	4	(Royal Spanish Football Federation) Barcelona
8	FW	César Delgado	18 August 1981 (aged 22)	19	2	(Mexican Football Federation) Cruz Azul
9	FW	Luciano Figueroa	19 May 1981 (aged 23)	10	5	(Mexican Football Federation) Cruz Azul
10	FW	Carlos Tevez	5 February 1984 (aged 20)	13	2	(Argentine Football Association) Boca Juniors
11	MF	Kily González*	4 August 1974 (aged 30)	55	8	(Italian Football Federation) Inter Milan
12	FW	Mauro Rosales	24 February 1981 (aged 23)	14	0	(Argentine Football Association) Newell's Old Boys
13	MF	Nicolás Medina	17 February 1982 (aged 22)	5	0	(The Football Association) Sunderland
14	DF	Clemente Rodríguez	31 July 1981 (aged 23)	13	0	(Russian Football Union) Spartak Moscow
15	MF	Andrés D'Alessandro	15 April 1981 (aged 23)	16	3	(German Football Association) Wolfsburg
16	MF	Lucho González	19 January 1981 (aged 23)	20	4	(Argentine Football Association) River Plate
17	FW	Mariano González	5 May 1981 (aged 23)	17	1	(Italian Football Federation) Palermo
18	GK	Germán Lux	7 June 1982 (aged 22)	0	0	(Argentine Football Association) River Plate
21	DF	Leandro Fernández (Note: Replaces Nicolás Burdisso who was injured during the competition)	30 January 1983 (aged 21)	0	0	(Argentine Football Association) Newell's Old Boys

* Over-aged player.

=== Australia ===
The following is the Australian squad in the men's football tournament of the 2004 Summer Olympics.

Head coach: Frank Farina

No.	Pos.	Player	Date of birth (age)	Caps	Goals	2004 club
1	GK	Brad Jones	19 March 1982 (aged 22)	4	0	(The Football Association) Middlesbrough
2	DF	Jade North	7 January 1982 (aged 22)	38	5	(Football Australia) Perth Glory
3	DF	Shane Cansdell-Sherriff	10 November 1982 (aged 21)	21	4	(Danish Football Association) Aarhus GF
4	DF	Craig Moore*	12 December 1975 (aged 28)	60	3	(Scottish Football Association) Rangers
5	MF	Jon McKain	21 September 1982 (aged 21)	16	2	(Romanian Football Federation) FC National Bucharest
6	DF	Adrian Madaschi	11 July 1982 (aged 22)	19	3	(Scottish Football Association) Partick Thistle
7	MF	Ahmad Elrich	30 May 1981 (aged 23)	35	7	(Football Australia) Parramatta Power
8	MF	Luke Wilkshire	2 October 1981 (aged 22)	22	5	(The Football Association) Bristol City
9	FW	John Aloisi*	5 February 1976 (aged 28)	38	18	(Royal Spanish Football Federation) Osasuna
10	MF	Tim Cahill*	6 December 1979 (aged 24)	4	6	(The Football Association) Millwall
11	FW	Alex Brosque	12 October 1983 (aged 20)	22	5	(Football Australia) Marconi Stallions
12	DF	David Tarka	11 February 1983 (aged 21)	19	1	(The Football Association) Nottingham Forest
13	MF	Carl Valeri	14 August 1984 (aged 19)	34	3	(Italian Football Federation) Inter Milan
14	FW	Brett Holman	27 March 1984 (aged 20)	18	7	(Royal Dutch Football Association) Excelsior Rotterdam
15	MF	Anthony Danze	15 March 1984 (aged 20)	21	8	(Football Australia) Perth Glory
16	MF	Spase Dilevski	13 May 1985 (aged 19)	25	2	(The Football Association) Tottenham Hotspur
17	MF	Ryan Griffiths	21 August 1981 (aged 22)	8	2	(Football Australia) Newcastle United Jets
18	GK	Eugene Galeković	12 June 1981 (aged 23)	6	0	(Football Australia) South Melbourne FC

* Over-aged player.

=== Serbia and Montenegro ===
The following is the Serbia and Montenegrin squad in the men's football tournament of the 2004 Summer Olympics.

Head coach: Vladimir Petrović

No.	Pos.	Player	Date of birth (age)	Caps	Goals	2004 club
1	GK	Nikola Milojević	16 April 1981 (aged 23)	7	0	(Football Association of Serbia and Montenegro) FK Hajduk Kula
2	DF	Milan Biševac	31 August 1983 (aged 20)	4	0	(Football Association of Serbia and Montenegro) Red Star Belgrade
3	DF	Bojan Neziri	26 February 1982 (aged 22)	5	0	(Ukrainian Association of Football) Metalurh Donetsk
4	DF	Milan Stepanov	2 April 1983 (aged 21)	0	0	(Football Association of Serbia and Montenegro) FK Vojvodina
5	DF	Đorđe Jokić	20 January 1981 (aged 23)	19	1	(Football Association of Serbia and Montenegro) OFK Belgrade
6	DF	Marko Baša	29 December 1982 (aged 21)	11	1	(Football Association of Serbia and Montenegro) OFK Belgrade
7	MF	Dejan Milovanović	21 January 1984 (aged 20)	13	3	(Football Association of Serbia and Montenegro) Red Star Belgrade
8	MF	Goran Lovré	23 March 1982 (aged 22)	11	1	(Royal Belgian Football Association) Anderlecht
9	FW	Andrija Delibašić	24 April 1981 (aged 23)	24	7	(Royal Spanish Football Federation) Mallorca
10	FW	Simon Vukčević	29 January 1986 (aged 18)	3	1	(Football Association of Serbia and Montenegro) FK Partizan
11	MF	Igor Matić	22 June 1981 (aged 23)	17	4	(Football Association of Serbia and Montenegro) OFK Belgrade
12	MF	Branimir Petrović	26 June 1982 (aged 22)	5	2	(Football Association of Serbia and Montenegro) FK Partizan
13	DF	Marko Lomić	13 September 1983 (aged 20)	0	0	(Football Association of Serbia and Montenegro) FK Železnik
14	DF	Branko Lazarević	14 May 1984 (aged 20)	0	0	(Football Association of Serbia and Montenegro) FK Vojvodina
15	MF	Miloš Krasić	1 November 1984 (aged 19)	7	1	(Russian Football Union) CSKA Moscow
16	FW	Nikola Nikezić	13 June 1981 (aged 23)	3	0	(Football Association of Serbia and Montenegro) FK Sutjeska
17	FW	Srđan Radonjić	8 May 1981 (aged 23)	2	1	(Football Association of Serbia and Montenegro) FK Partizan
18	GK	Aleksandar Čanović	18 February 1983 (aged 21)	0	0	(Football Association of Serbia and Montenegro) FK Vojvodina

* Over-aged player.

=== Tunisia ===
The following is the Tunisian squad in the men's football tournament of the 2004 Summer Olympics.

Head coach: Khemais Labidi

No.	Pos.	Player	Date of birth (age)	Caps	Goals	2004 club
1	GK	Khaled Fadhel*	29 September 1976 (aged 27)	0	0	(Tunisian Football Federation) CS Sfaxien
2	DF	Anis Boussaidi	10 April 1981 (aged 23)	0	0	(Tunisian Football Federation) Stade Tunisien
3	DF	Karim Haggui	20 January 1984 (aged 20)	0	0	(French Football Federation) Strasbourg
4	DF	Alaeddine Yahia	26 September 1981 (aged 22)	0	0	(French Football Federation) Guingamp
5	FW	Sabeur Trabelsi	18 February 1984 (aged 20)	0	0	(Tunisian Football Federation) Étoile Sahel
6	MF	Houcine Ragued	11 February 1983 (aged 21)	0	0	(French Football Federation) Paris Saint-Germain
7	DF	Amir Hadj Massaoued	8 February 1981 (aged 23)	0	0	(Tunisian Football Federation) CS Sfaxien
8	DF	Zied Bhairi	5 February 1981 (aged 23)	0	0	(Tunisian Football Federation) Espérance
9	FW	Ali Zitouni	11 January 1981 (aged 23)	0	0	(Tunisian Football Federation) Espérance
10	MF	Khaled Mouelhi	13 February 1981 (aged 23)	0	0	(Tunisian Football Federation) Club Africain
11	FW	Amine Ltaief	4 July 1984 (aged 20)	0	0	(French Football Federation) Créteil
12	DF	Anis Ayari	16 February 1982 (aged 22)	0	0	(Tunisian Football Federation) Stade Tunisien
13	MF	Wissem Ben Yahia	9 September 1984 (aged 19)	0	0	(Tunisian Football Federation) Club Africain
14	MF	Mejdi Traoui	13 December 1983 (aged 20)	0	0	(Tunisian Football Federation) Étoile Sahel
15	DF	Jose Clayton*	21 March 1974 (aged 30)	0	0	(Tunisian Football Federation) Espérance
16	DF	Issam Merdassi	16 March 1981 (aged 23)	0	0	(Tunisian Football Federation) CS Sfaxien
17	FW	Mohamed Jedidi*	10 September 1978 (aged 25)	0	0	(Tunisian Football Federation) Étoile Sahel
18	GK	Jassem Khaloufi	2 September 1981 (aged 22)	0	0	(Tunisian Football Federation) AS Marsa

* Over-aged player.

== Group D ==
=== Costa Rica ===
The following is the Costa Rican squad in the men's football tournament of the 2004 Summer Olympics.

Head coach: Rodrigo Kenton

No.	Pos.	Player	Date of birth (age)	Caps	Goals	2004 club
1	GK	Victor Bolivar	3 September 1983 (aged 20)	0	0	(Costa Rican Football Federation) Municipal Liberia
2	DF	Michael Rodriguez	30 December 1981 (aged 22)	0	1	(Costa Rican Football Federation) Alajuelense
3	DF	Pablo Salazar	21 November 1982 (aged 21)	0	2	(Costa Rican Football Federation) LD Alajuelense
4	DF	Michael Umaña	16 July 1982 (aged 22)	0	0	(Costa Rican Football Federation) Herediano
5	DF	Roy Myrie	21 August 1982 (aged 21)	0	3	(Costa Rican Football Federation) Alajuelense
6	FW	Whayne Wilson*	7 September 1975 (aged 28)	0	0	(Costa Rican Football Federation) Cartaginés
7	FW	Erick Scott	29 May 1981 (aged 23)	0	10	(United States Soccer Federation) Columbus Crew
8	MF	José Luis López	31 March 1981 (aged 23)	0	2	(Costa Rican Football Federation) Herediano
9	MF	Pablo Brenes	4 August 1982 (aged 22)	0	1	(United States Soccer Federation) MetroStars
10	MF	Warren Granados	6 December 1981 (aged 22)	0	3	(Costa Rican Football Federation) Alajuelense
11	FW	Álvaro Saborío	25 March 1982 (aged 22)	0	11	(Costa Rican Football Federation) Deportivo Saprissa
12	MF	Leonardo Araya	15 February 1982 (aged 22)	0	1	(Costa Rican Football Federation) Santos de Guápiles
13	DF	Daniel Vallejos	27 May 1981 (aged 23)	0	0	(Costa Rican Football Federation) Herediano
14	DF	José Villalobos	5 June 1981 (aged 23)	0	0	(Costa Rican Football Federation) Cartaginés
15	DF	Júnior Díaz	12 September 1983 (aged 20)	0	4	(Costa Rican Football Federation) Herediano
16	MF	Carlos Hernández	9 April 1982 (aged 22)	0	0	(Costa Rican Football Federation) Alajuelense
17	FW	Jairo Arrieta	25 August 1983 (aged 20)	0	0	(Costa Rican Football Federation) Brujas
18	GK	Neighel Drummond	2 February 1982 (aged 22)	0	0	(Costa Rican Football Federation) Alajuelense

* Over-aged player.

=== Iraq ===
The following is the Iraqi squad in the men's football tournament of the 2004 Summer Olympics.

Head coach: Adnan Hamad

No.	Pos.	Player	Date of birth (age)	Caps	Goals	2004 club
1	GK	Noor Sabri	18 June 1984 (aged 20)	0	0	(Iraq) Al-Talaba
2	DF	Saad Attiya	26 February 1987 (aged 17)	0	0	(Iraq) Al-Zawraa
3	DF	Bassim Abbas	1 July 1982 (aged 22)	0	0	(Iraq) Al-Talaba
4	DF	Haidar Abdul-Jabar*	25 August 1976 (aged 27)	0	0	(Syrian Football Association) Al-Ittihad Aleppo
5	MF	Nashat Akram	12 September 1984 (aged 19)	0	0	(Saudi Arabian Football Federation) Al Shabab
6	MF	Salih Sadir	21 August 1981 (aged 22)	0	0	(Lebanese Football Association) Al-Ansar
7	FW	Emad Mohammed	24 July 1982 (aged 22)	0	0	(Football Federation Islamic Republic of Iran) Foolad FC
8	MF	Abdul-Wahab Abu Al-Hail*	21 December 1976 (aged 27)	0	0	(Football Federation Islamic Republic of Iran) Esteghlal Ahvaz
9	FW	Razzaq Farhan*	1 July 1977 (aged 27)	0	0	(Bahrain Football Association) Al Rifaa
10	FW	Younis Mahmoud	3 February 1983 (aged 21)	0	0	(Qatar Football Association) Al-Khor
11	MF	Hawar Mulla Mohammed	1 June 1981 (aged 23)	0	0	(Lebanese Football Association) Al-Ansar
12	DF	Haidar Abdul-Razzaq	9 June 1982 (aged 22)	0	0	(Syrian Football Association) Al-Ittihad Aleppo
13	MF	Qusay Munir	12 April 1981 (aged 23)	0	0	(Saudi Arabian Football Federation) Al Hazm
14	DF	Haidar Abdul-Amir	5 April 1982 (aged 22)	0	0	(Iraq) Al-Zawraa
15	MF	Mahdi Karim	10 December 1983 (aged 20)	0	0	(Cyprus Football Association) Apollon Limassol
16	FW	Ahmad Mnajed	13 December 1981 (aged 22)	0	0	(Iraq) Al-Zawraa
17	FW	Ahmed Salah	18 June 1982 (aged 22)	0	0	(Syrian Football Association) Al-Ittihad Aleppo
18	GK	Uday Talib	6 November 1981 (aged 22)	0	0	(Iraq) Al-Zawraa

* Over-aged player.

=== Morocco ===
The following is the Moroccan squad in the men's football tournament of the 2004 Summer Olympics.

Head coach: Mustapha Madih

No.	Pos.	Player	Date of birth (age)	Caps	Goals	2004 club
1	GK	Omar Charef	19 February 1981 (aged 23)	24	0	(Royal Moroccan Football Federation) Mouloudia Club d'Oujda
2	DF	Moncef Zerka	30 August 1981 (aged 22)	10	0	(French Football Federation) Nancy
3	MF	Salaheddine Aqqal	1 January 1984 (aged 20)	18	1	(Royal Moroccan Football Federation) Khourigba
4	DF	Jamal Alioui	2 June 1982 (aged 22)	11	1	(Italian Football Federation) Perugia
5	MF	Merouane Zemmama	7 October 1983 (aged 20)	12	9	(Royal Moroccan Football Federation) Raja Casablanca
6	DF	Badr El Kaddouri	31 January 1981 (aged 23)	19	0	(Ukrainian Association of Football) Dynamo Kyiv
7	FW	Farid Talhaoui	10 February 1982 (aged 22)	4	0	(French Football Federation) Guingamp
8	MF	Yazid Kaissi	16 May 1981 (aged 23)	9	3	(French Football Federation) Lens
9	FW	Mustapha Allaoui	30 May 1983 (aged 21)	21	12	(Royal Moroccan Football Federation) MAS Fes
10	FW	Bouabid Bouden	1 February 1982 (aged 22)	28	15	(French Football Federation) Lens
11	FW	Mehdi Taouil	20 May 1983 (aged 21)	6	2	(German Football Association) Nürnberg
12	FW	Bouchaib El Moubarki*	12 January 1978 (aged 26)	20	0	(United Arab Emirates Football Association) Al Wasl FC
13	DF	Oussama Souaidy	25 August 1981 (aged 22)	18	7	(Royal Spanish Football Federation) Mallorca
14	MF	Azzeddine Ourahou	12 August 1984 (aged 20)	4	0	(French Football Federation) Istres
15	DF	Tajeddine Sami	10 June 1982 (aged 22)	18	2	(Royal Moroccan Football Federation) Raja Casablanca
16	DF	Elamine Erbate	1 January 1981 (aged 23)	31	5	(Royal Moroccan Football Federation) Raja Casablanca
17	MF	Otmane El Assas*	30 January 1979 (aged 25)	35	8	(Qatar Football Association) Al Ittihad
18	GK	Nadir Lamyaghri*	13 February 1976 (aged 28)	30	13	(Royal Moroccan Football Federation) Wydad Athletic Club

* Over-aged player.

=== Portugal ===
The following is the Portuguese squad in the men's football tournament of the 2004 Summer Olympics.

Head coach: José Romão

No.	Pos.	Player	Date of birth (age)	Caps	Goals	2004 club
1	GK	José Moreira	20 March 1982 (aged 22)	81	0	(Portuguese Football Federation) Benfica
2	DF	Mário Sérgio	28 July 1981 (aged 23)	24	0	(Portuguese Football Federation) Sporting CP
3	MF	Raul Meireles	17 March 1983 (aged 21)	52	3	(Portuguese Football Federation) Porto
4	DF	Bruno Alves	27 November 1981 (aged 22)	30	3	(Portuguese Football Federation) Porto
5	DF	Ricardo Costa	16 May 1981 (aged 23)	87	9	(Portuguese Football Federation) Porto
6	DF	Fernando Meira*	5 June 1978 (aged 26)	83	2	(German Football Association) Stuttgart
7	FW	Cristiano Ronaldo	5 February 1985 (aged 19)	44	17	(The Football Association) Manchester United
8	MF	Hugo Viana	15 January 1983 (aged 21)	64	8	(Portuguese Football Federation) Sporting CP
9	FW	Hugo Almeida	23 May 1984 (aged 20)	0	0	(Portuguese Football Federation) Porto
10	MF	Carlos Martins	29 April 1982 (aged 22)	70	20	(Portuguese Football Federation) Sporting CP
11	MF	Jorge Ribeiro	9 November 1981 (aged 22)	55	7	(Portuguese Football Federation) Gil Vicente
12	DF	Nuno Frechaut*	24 September 1977 (aged 26)	37	1	(Portuguese Football Federation) Boavista
13	MF	Luís Boa Morte*	4 August 1977 (aged 27)	53	11	(The Football Association) Fulham
14	DF	José Bosingwa	24 August 1982 (aged 21)	57	2	(Portuguese Football Federation) Porto
15	FW	Luís Lourenço	5 June 1983 (aged 21)	71	24	(Portuguese Football Federation) Belenenses
16	DF	João Paulo	6 June 1981 (aged 23)	38	7	(Portuguese Football Federation) União de Leiria
17	FW	Danny	7 August 1983 (aged 21)	32	4	(Portuguese Football Federation) Sporting CP
18	GK	Bruno Vale	8 April 1983 (aged 21)	43	0	(Portuguese Football Federation) Porto

* Over-aged player.
