= Football at the 2004 Summer Olympics – Men's tournament final =

2004 Summer Olympics Men's football final
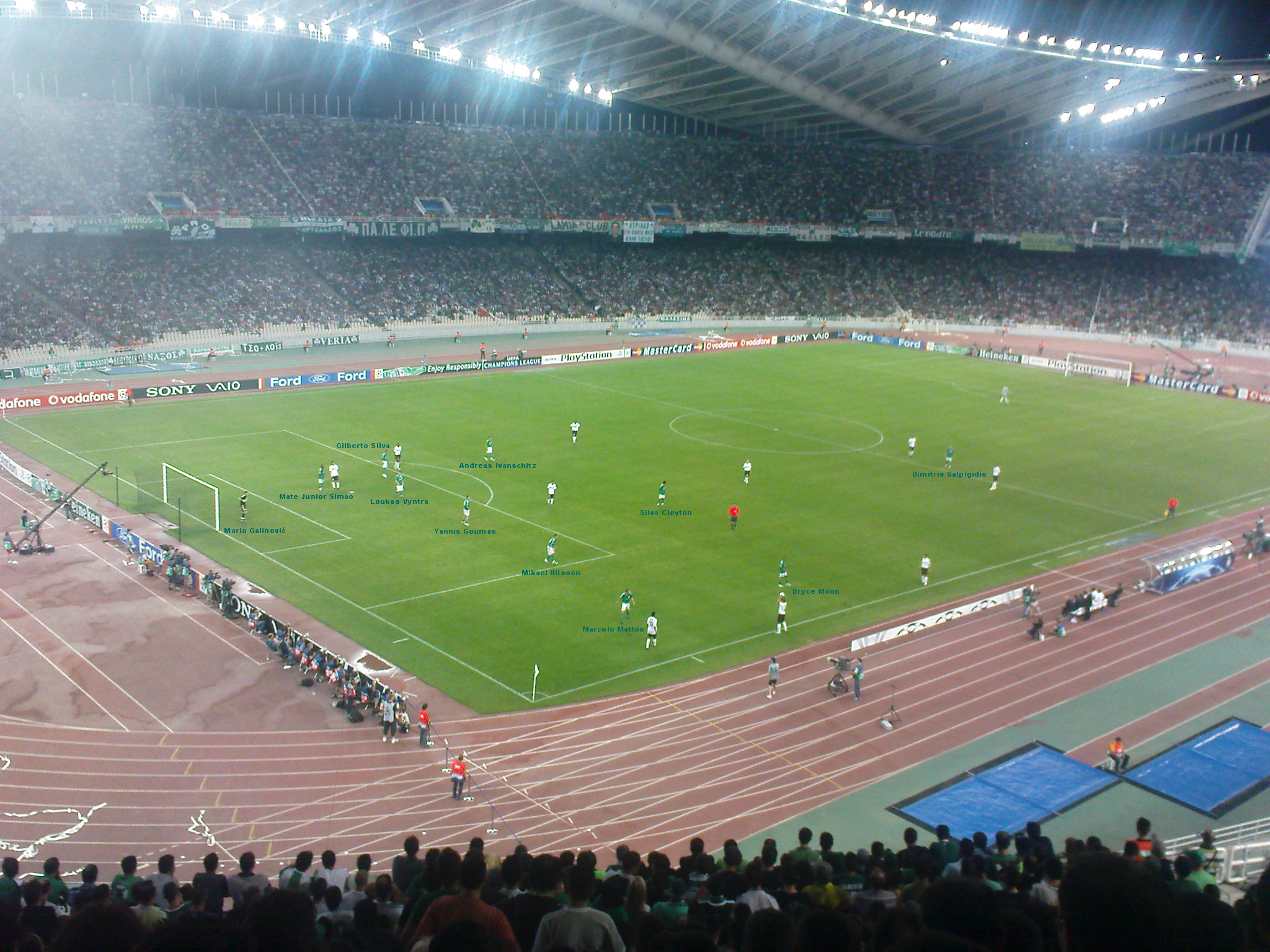
- Olympic Stadium in Athens hosted the final
- Event: Football at the 2004 Summer Olympics – Men's tournament
Argentina	Paraguay
1	0
- Date: 28 August 2004
- Venue: Olympic Stadium, Athens
- Referee: Kyros Vassaras (Greece)
- Attendance: 41,116

The 2004 Summer Olympics Football Final was a football match that took place at the Summer Olympic Games in Athens, Greece on 28 August 2004 to determine the winner of the men's football tournament at the 2004 Summer Olympics. It was the 21nd final of the men's football tournament at the Summer Olympics, a quadrennial tournament contested for the men's under-23 national teams of FIFA to decide the Olympic champions.

Argentina contested their third final (their previous appearance had been in 1928 and 1996 winning the silver medal) while Paraguay contested their first olympic final

In front of a crowd of 41,116, Argentina won their first Olympic gold medal in football, defeating Paraguay, 1–0. It was the second olympic final contested by teams from South America after the 1928 edition.

== Background ==
Argentina's manager was Marcelo Bielsa, who had been in charge of the national side since 1998. Roberto Ayala, Gabriel Heinze, and Cristian González were the three above 23-age players that took part in the tournament.

From the outset, the approach to the competition had its own unique aspects. Unlike the usual practice of the Argentine Football Association (AFA), the men's football squad stayed in the Olympic village rather than in a hotel separate from the other athletes.

The experience was completely different for us. Living in the Olympic Village shows you the amateur world, which has nothing to do with professional football. Encountering the most genuine side of amateurism was beautiful. It was a situation we hadn't expected, but it motivated us as we approached the tournament.

— Nicolás Burdisso

We spent three or four days preparing for the final, getting up at 6 a.m. because the match was played at 10 a.m. During those days, we ran a sort of dress rehearsal to get ready for the schedule: we'd wake up, go have breakfast in the Olympic village dining hall, and then head to the pitch

— Javier Mascherano

On the other hand, Paraguay, coached by Carlos Jara Saguier, drew against Brazil in the South American Pre-Olympic tournament held in Chile that same year, reaching the 6 points needed to finish second in the final standings –behind Argentina, but ahead of the Brazilian side and the host nation– thereby securing a spot in the Olympic Games. Defender Carlos Gamarra, midfielder Julio César Enciso, and forward José Cardozo were the three players over the age of 23 permitted by the International Olympic Committee.

== Route to the final ==
Argentina
R.	Opponent	Result
1	Serbia and Montengreo	6–0
2	Tunisia	2–0
3	Australia	1–0
QF	Costa Rica	4–0
SF	Italy	3–0

Paraguay
R.	Opponent	Result
1	Japan	4–3
2	Ghana	1–2
3	Italy	1–0
QF	South Korea	3–2
SF	Iraq	3–1

== Match ==
=== Summary ===
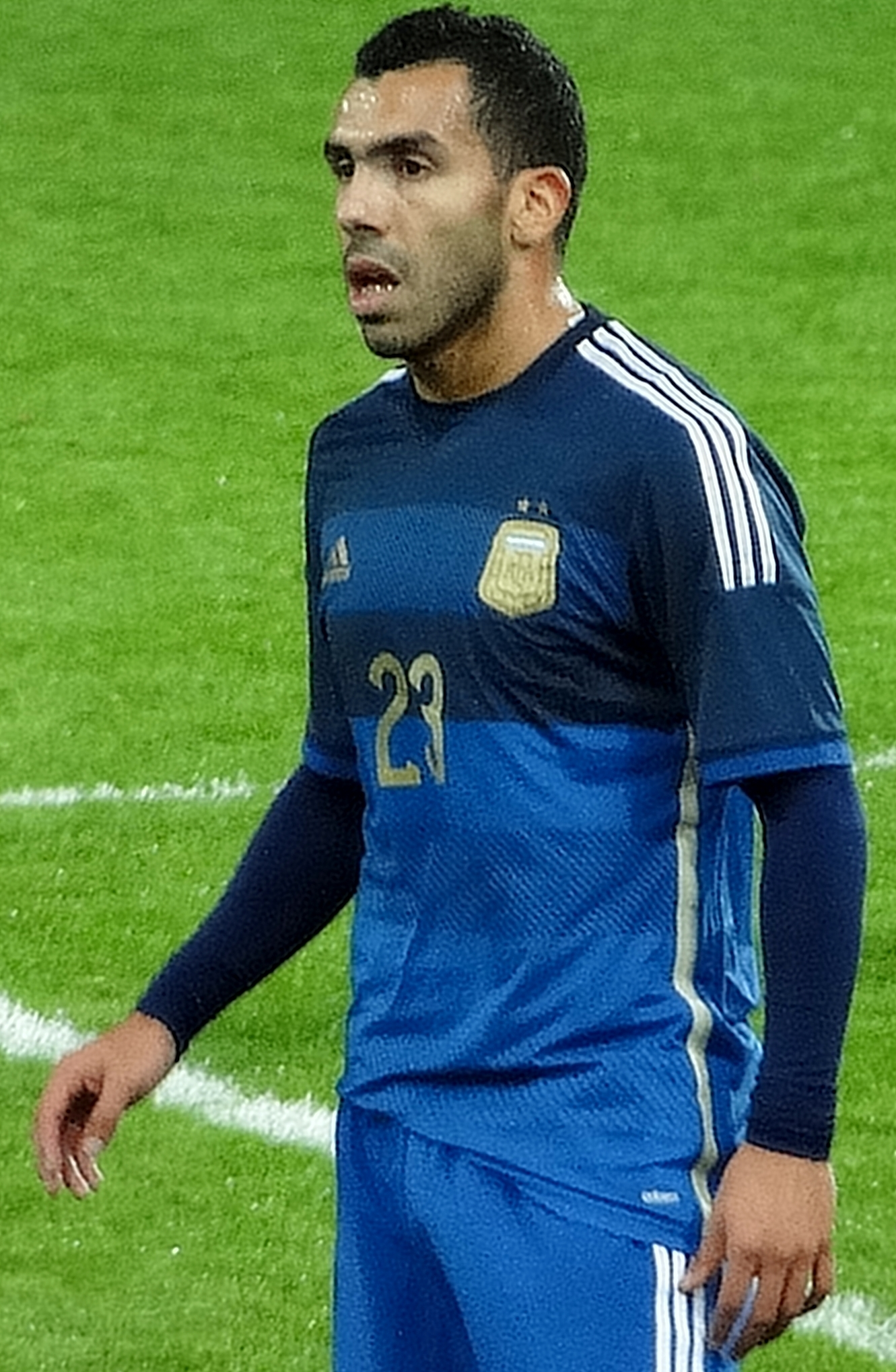
Carlos Tévez scored the only goal of the match. Besides, he was the tournament's top scorer with 8 goals

The first 15 minutes of play passed without either team establishing clear dominance, and there were no dangerous scoring chances, save for an error by goalkeeper Germán Lux and a shot from César "Chelito" Delgado.

The Paraguayan team, managed by Carlos García Jara, entered into the pitch without his star forward José Cardozo due to injury. They began with a defensive approach and tight marking on the Argentine side, who proved unable to overcome this defensive resistance from Paraguay. Thus it was not until the 18th minute that Argentina managed to open the scoring, when Lucho González sent a cross to Carlos Tévez, who anticipated the fierce marking by Julio Manzur and Carlos Gamarra to score the goal that put Argentina in the lead.

Despite the Paraguay persisted with its style of play, relying solely on crosses into the Argentine area while maintaining an aggressive defensive stance (bordering on foul play) that resulted in five yellow cards and two red cards by the end of the match. At this stage, Argentina clearly dominated the match, generating several dangerous opportunities to extend their lead. In the final five minutes of the first half, Argentina persistently sought a second goal with shots from Andrés D'Alessandro, Lucho González, and Tévez, being the last one saved by Paraguayan goalkeeper Diego Barreto.

Argentina took control of the match, creating several dangerous opportunities to extend their lead. The first of these came from "Chelito" Delgado, whose left-footed shot—which had already beaten goalkeeper Diego Barreto was deflected by the Paraguayan defense for a corner kick.

The team managed by Marcelo Bielsa began the second half with the composure that comes from holding a lead. In the 50th minute, Kily González delivered a pass to Mauro Rosales, and two minutes later, Tevez also took a shot; both attempts went wide, highlighting Argentina's superiority over their opponents.

Gamarra saved a shot from Delgado that was headed for a goal, and the subsequent sending-off of Diego Figueredo all but sealed the final result. Argentina won their first gold medal in the history of the national team

=== Details ===
28 August 2004
10:00

Argentina	1–0	Paraguay
Tevez 18'	Report

Olympic Stadium, Athens
Attendance: 41,116
Referee: Kyros Vassaras (Greece)

Source for cards:

Argentina	Paraguay

GK	18	Germán Lux
RB	4	Fabricio Coloccini
CB	2	Roberto Ayala (c)
CB	5	Javier Mascherano
LB	6	Gabriel Heinze
CM	12	Mauro Rosales
CM	16	Lucho González
CM	11	Kily González	(yellow card) 48'
AM	15	Andrés D'Alessandro
CF	8	César Delgado		(substituted off) 76'
CF	10	Carlos Tevez
Substitutes:
DF	14	Clemente Rodríguez		(substituted on) 76'
Manager:
(Argentina) Marcelo Bielsa

GK	18	Diego Barreto
RB	2	Emilio Martínez	(red card) 66'
CB	4	Carlos Gamarra (c)	(yellow card) 30'
CB	3	Julio Manzur	(yellow card) 37'
LB	6	Celso Esquivel	(yellow card) 45'	(substituted off) 76'
CM	8	Edgar Barreto		(substituted off) 72'
CM	13	Julio Enciso		(substituted off) 63'
RW	9	Fredy Bareiro
AM	10	Diego Figueredo	(yellow card) 65'
LW	11	Aureliano Torres	(yellow card) 72'
CF	7	Pablo Giménez
Substitutes:
MF	16	Osvaldo Díaz		(substituted on) 63'
MF	15	Ernesto Cristaldo		(substituted on) 72'
FW	14	Julio González	(yellow card) 87'	(substituted on) 76'
Manager:
(Paraguay) Carlos Jara Saguier

== Aftermath ==
Marcelo Bielsa leaded the team to the first olympic medal in their history

That gold medal won in Athens was the first Olympic final won by Argentina after two losses in 1928 and 1996, earning the only title that Argentina did not have, also winning the first official title since the 1986 FIFA World Cup Argentina finished the tournament without conceding a single goal and took home the Fair Play trophy. Furthermore, the team scored 17 goals in 5 matches and Carlos Tévez was the top scorer of the tournamente

Carlos Tévez (scored 8 goals in 6 matches), Javier Mascherano, Lucho González, and Andrés D'Alessandro were some key figures for Argentina in that tournament President of AFA Julio Grondona praised the performance of the national team highlighting "the tremendous love for the jersey they [the players] wear and when I say 'love', I am using the right word"

It was also the first title won by manager Marcelo Bielsa with a national team, won his first tournament with the national team after the demise in the 2002 FIFA World Cup when the national side was eliminated in the first round, and the 2004 Copa América final lost to Brazil some months earlier.

Nevertheless, a few days after the Olympic triumph, on September 14 and after a 3–1 win v Peru in the 2006 FIFA World Cup qualification, Marcelo Bielsa announced his resignation with a phrase that left an indelible mark: "I have run out of energy2

The secret was the spirit and harmony of the group. Despite the pain we were carrying [after the Copa América final lost], we steeled ourselves to win the gold that no one had ever achieved before. What we accomplished in Athens is something truly wonderful—the kind of achievement that is celebrated for a lifetime, and one that only grows more meaningful as time goes by.

— Andrés D'Alessandro
