= 2004 CONMEBOL Pre-Olympic Tournament =

Tournament details
- Host country: Chile
- Dates: 7 January – 25 January
- Teams: 10
- Venue: 5 (in 5 host cities)

Final positions
- Champions: Argentina (4th title)
- Runners-up: Paraguay
- Third place: Brazil
- Fourth place: Chile

Tournament statistics
- Matches played: 28
- Goals scored: 89 (3.18 per match)
- Top scorer: (Colombia) Sergio Herrera (5 goals)

The 2004 CONMEBOL Pre-Olympic Tournament began on 7 January 2004, and is the 12th CONMEBOL Pre-Olympic Tournament. This was the 4th tournament is open to players under the age of 23 without any other restriction. There is no qualification stage and all 10 member of CONMEBOL automatic qualified. The winner and the runner-up qualified for 2004 Summer Olympics. Players born on or after 1 January 1981 were eligible to play in this competition.

== Host nation and venues ==
On 16 July 2002, during a meeting of the CONMEBOL Executive Committee, Chile was named as the host country of the tournament at the request of the Football Federation of Chile. This decision was ratified a year later, on 7 August 2003. It was the first time that Chile hosted the CONMEBOL Pre-Olympic Tournament.

On 22 August 2003, the Football Federation of Chile proposed five host cities, with Concepción (Group A), La Serena and Coquimbo (both of Group B) as host cities of the first stage matches, while Viña del Mar and Valparaíso would host the final stage matches.

Coquimbo	La Serena	Location of host cities
Estadio Municipal Francisco Sánchez Rumoroso	Estadio La Portada	Location of host cities
Capacity: 13,000	Capacity: 18,000	Location of host cities
Viña del Mar	Valparaíso	Location of host cities
Estadio Sausalito	Estadio Playa Ancha	Location of host cities
Capacity: 18,000	Capacity: 16,000	Location of host cities
Concepción		Location of host cities
Estadio Municipal de Concepción		Location of host cities
Capacity: 32,000		Location of host cities

== Teams ==
All ten CONMEBOL member national teams entered the tournament.

Team	Appearance	Previous best top-4 performance
Argentina	10th	Winners (1960, 1964, 1980)
Bolivia	7th	Third place (1987)
Brazil (holders)	12th	Winners (1968, 1971, 1976, 1984, 1987, 1996, 2000)
Chile (hosts)	11th	Runners-up (1984, 2000)
Colombia	12th	Runners-up (1968, 1971, 1980, 1992)
Ecuador	9th	Fourth place (1984, 1992)
Paraguay	8th	Winners (1992)
Peru	11th	Runners-up (1960)
Uruguay	10th	Runners-up (1976)
Venezuela	9th	Fourth place (1980, 1996)

== Groups composition ==
The groups were composed according to the proposal presented by Reinaldo Sanchez, president of the Football Federation of Chile, on 22 August 2003. The proposal was unanimously approved by the CONMEBOL Executive Committee and the groups were formed as follows:

Group A Chile Brazil Uruguay Paraguay Venezuela	Group B Argentina Colombia Ecuador Bolivia Peru

== Match officials ==
On 10 December 2003, the CONMEBOL Referee Commission announced 11 referees and 22 assistant referees appointed for the tournament.

- (Argentina) Claudio Martín
  - Assistant: Juan Carlos Rebollo
- (Bolivia) René Ortubé
  - Assistant: Arol Valda
- (Brazil) Paulo César de Oliveira
  - Assistant: Valter José Reis
- (Chile) Carlos Chandía and Pablo Pozo
  - Assistant: Cristian Julio
- (Colombia) Fernando Paneso
  - Assistant: Carlos Sierra
- (Ecuador) Pedro Senatore Ramos
  - Assistant: Félix Badaraco
- (Paraguay) Carlos Amarilla
  - Assistants: Amelio Andino
- (Peru) Gilberto Hidalgo and Víctor Hugo Rivera
  - Assistant: Luis Ávila
- (Uruguay) Gustavo Méndez
  - Assistant: Pablo Fandiño
- (Venezuela) Luis Solórzano
  - Assistants: Gerardo Quintero

== Matches ==
=== First stage ===
==== Group A ====
Team	Pld	W	D	L	GF	GA	GD	Pts
Chile	4	3	1	0	10	3	+7	10
Brazil	4	2	2	0	9	2	+7	8
Paraguay	4	2	0	2	7	8	-1	6
Uruguay	4	0	2	2	3	7	-4	2
Venezuela	4	0	1	3	2	11	-9	1

7 January 2004
20:00

Chile	3 – 0	Uruguay
M.González 5'; Soto 33'; Villanueva 49'	Report

Estadio Municipal, Concepción
Attendance: 32,000
Referee: Claudio Martín (Argentina)

7 January 2004
22:10

Brazil	4 – 0	Venezuela
Diego 47'; Dagoberto 58'; Robinho 83' (pen.); Marcel 89'	Report

Estadio Municipal, Concepción
Attendance: 20,000
Referee: Fernando Paneso (Colombia)

9 January 2004
20:00

Chile	3 – 0	Venezuela
Valdivia 42'; Villanueva 54'; Luis Figueroa 90+1'	Report

Estadio Municipal, Concepción
Attendance: 17,000
Referee: Pedro Ramos (Ecuador)

9 January 2004
22:10

Brazil	3 – 0	Paraguay
Diego 8' (pen.); Robinho 51' (pen.); Maicon 53'	Report

Estadio Municipal, Concepción
Attendance: 14,000
Referee: Gilberto Hidalgo (Peru)

11 January 2004
16:00

Brazil	1 – 1	Uruguay
Robinho 41'	Report	Vigneri 37'

Estadio Municipal, Concepción
Attendance: 1,500
Referee: Claudio Martín (Argentina)

11 January 2004
18:10

Paraguay	3 – 1	Venezuela
J.González 11' (pen.) 43'; Giménez 52'	Report	Maldonado 25'

Estadio Municipal, Concepción
Attendance: 1,200
Referee: René Ortubé (Bolivia)

13 January 2004
20:00

Uruguay	1 – 1	Venezuela
Olivera 61'	Report	Maldonado 2'

Estadio Municipal, Concepción
Attendance: 15,000
Referee: Víctor Rivera (Peru)

13 January 2004
22:10

Chile	3 – 2	Paraguay
Soto 65' (pen.); Beausejour 75'; Leal 83'	Report	Figueredo 41'; Torres 70'

Estadio Municipal, Concepción
Attendance: 27,000
Referee: Fernando Paneso (Colombia)

15 January 2004
20:00

Uruguay	1 – 2	Paraguay
García 30'	Report	Díaz 9'; Bareiro 85'

Estadio Municipal, Concepción
Attendance: 30,000
Referee: Gilberto Hidalgo (Peru)

15 January 2004
22:10

Chile	1 – 1	Brazil
Beausejour 63'	Report	Alex 19'

Estadio Municipal, Concepción
Attendance: 33,000
Referee: Claudio Martín (Argentina)

==== Group B ====
Team	Pld	W	D	L	GF	GA	GD	Pts
Argentina	4	3	1	0	11	5	+6	10
Ecuador	4	3	0	1	10	9	+1	9
Colombia	4	2	0	2	7	6	+1	6
Peru	4	1	1	2	6	9	-3	4
Bolivia	4	0	0	4	5	10	-5	0

8 January 2004
20:00

Colombia	0 – 1	Ecuador
	Report	Miña 14'

Estadio Francisco Sánchez Rumoroso, Coquimbo
Attendance: 5,000
Referee: Paulo César Oliveira (Brazil)

8 January 2004
22:10

Argentina	0 – 0	Peru
	Report

Estadio Francisco Sánchez Rumoroso, Coquimbo
Attendance: 7,000
Referee: Carlos Chandía (Chile)

10 January 2004
20:00

Argentina	2 – 1	Bolivia
Tevez 45+1'; Luis González 49'	Report	Arce 16'

Estadio Francisco Sánchez Rumoroso, Coquimbo
Attendance: 2,500
Referee: Luis Solórzano (Venezuela)

10 January 2004
22:10

Colombia	3 – 1	Peru
Herrera 45+1' (pen.), 57', 86'	Report	Guerrero 34'

Estadio Francisco Sánchez Rumoroso, Coquimbo
Attendance: 3,500
Referee: Gustavo Méndez (Uruguay)

12 January 2004
20:00

Ecuador	4 – 2	Peru
Baldeón 9', 16'; Salas 58' (pen.); Miña 72'	Report	Alberto Rodríguez 47'; Guerrero 82'

Estadio Francisco Sánchez Rumoroso, Coquimbo
Attendance: 2,000
Referee: Carlos Amarilia (Paraguay)

12 January 2004
22:10

Colombia	2 – 0	Bolivia
Herrera 28'; Arzuaga 90'	Report

Estadio Francisco Sánchez Rumoroso, Coquimbo
Attendance: 2,000
Referee: Pablo Pozo (Chile)

14 January 2004
20:00

Argentina	5 – 2	Ecuador
Luis González 6'; Ferreyra 9', 60'; Fernández 22'; Delgado 75'	Report	Salas 1' (pen.); Perlaza 50'

Estadio La Portada, La Serena
Attendance: 4,679
Referee: Paulo César Oliveira (Brazil)

14 January 2004
22:10

Peru	3 – 2	Bolivia
Guerrero 58'; Aguirre 66', 68'	Report	Arce 31'; Castillo 75'

Estadio La Portada, La Serena
Attendance: 4,679
Referee: Carlos Chandía (Chile)

16 January 2004
20:00

Argentina	4 – 2	Colombia
Mosquera 14' (o.g.); Luis González 30'; Gonzalo Rodríguez 38'; Ferreyra 66'	Report	Álvaro Domínguez 21'; Herrera 70'

Estadio La Portada, La Serena
Attendance: 2,500
Referee: Carlos Amarilia (Paraguay)

16 January 2004
22:10

Ecuador	3 – 2	Bolivia
Checa 29'; Salas 47'; Borja 70'	Report	Ortiz 58'; Castillo 65'

Estadio La Portada, La Serena
Attendance: 5,000
Referee: Gustavo Méndez (Uruguay)

=== Playoffs ===
18 January 2004
17:00

Brazil	3 – 0	Colombia
Alex 11'; Marcel 46'; Dudu 81'	Report

Estadio Playa Ancha, Valparaíso
Attendance: 1,000
Referee: Gustavo Méndez (Uruguay)

18 January 2004
19:30

Ecuador	0 – 0	Paraguay
	Report
Penalties
Guagua (penalty scored); Miña (penalty scored); Valencia (penalty missed); Baldeón (penalty missed)	2 – 4	(penalty scored) Díaz; (penalty scored) E.Barreto; (penalty scored) Bareiro; (penalty scored) Martínez

Estadio Playa Ancha, Valparaíso
Attendance: 1,300
Referee: Luis Solórzano (Venezuela)

=== Final stage ===
Team	Pld	W	D	L	GF	GA	GD	Pts
Argentina	3	2	1	0	5	3	+2	7
Paraguay	3	2	0	1	4	3	+1	6
Brazil	3	1	0	2	3	3	0	3
Chile	3	0	1	2	4	7	-3	1

21 January 2004
21:00

Chile	1 – 2	Paraguay
Millar 62'	Report	Bareiro 80'; Figueredo 82'

Estadio Playa Ancha, Valparaíso
Attendance: 16,505
Referee: Gustavo Méndez (Uruguay)

21 January 2004
23:10

Argentina	1 – 0	Brazil
G. Rodríguez 77'	Report

Estadio Playa Ancha, Valparaíso
Attendance: 16,505
Referee: Gilberto Hidalgo (Peru)

23 January 2004
20:00

Argentina	2 – 1	Paraguay
Figueroa 76', 79'	Report	Achucarro 55'

Estadio Sausalito, Viña del Mar
Attendance: 15,292
Referee: René Ortubé (Bolivia)

23 January 2004
22:10

Chile	1 – 3	Brazil
M. González 30'	Report	Marcel 5'; Dudu 51'; Diego 55'

Estadio Sausalito, Viña del Mar
Attendance: 15,292
Referee: Luis Solórzano (Venezuela)

25 January 2004
17:00

Brazil	0 – 1	Paraguay
	Report	Devaca 32'

Estadio Sausalito, Viña del Mar
Attendance: 9,000
Referee: Gustavo Méndez (Uruguay)

25 January 2004
19:30

Chile	2 – 2	Argentina
Bascuñán 5'; Beausejour 61'	Report	Figueroa 4'; A. Domínguez 38'

Estadio Sausalito, Viña del Mar
Attendance: 12,000
Referee: Gilberto Hidalgo (Peru)

== Scorers ==
5 goals

- (Colombia) Sergio Herrera

3 goals

- (Argentina) Osmar Ferreyra
- (Argentina) Luciano Figueroa
- (Argentina) Luis González
- (Brazil) Diego
- (Brazil) Marcel
- (Brazil) Robinho
- (Chile) Jean Beausejour
- (Ecuador) Franklin Salas
- (Peru) José Paolo Guerrero

2 goals

- (Argentina) Gonzalo Rodríguez
- (Bolivia) Juan Carlos Arce
- (Bolivia) José Alfredo Castillo
- (Brazil) Alex
- (Brazil) Dudu
- (Chile) Mark González
- (Chile) Joel Soto
- (Chile) José Luis Villanueva
- (Ecuador) Jhonny Baldeón
- (Ecuador) Roberto Miña
- (Paraguay) Fredy Bareiro
- (Paraguay) Diego Figueredo
- (Paraguay) Julio González
- (Peru) Wilmer Aguirre
- (Venezuela) Giancarlo Maldonado

1 goal

- (Argentina) César Delgado
- (Argentina) Alejandro Domínguez
- (Argentina) Leandro Fernández
- (Argentina) Carlos Tevez
- (Bolivia) Jorge Ortiz
- (Brazil) Dagoberto
- (Brazil) Maicon
- (Chile) Rubén Bascuñán
- (Chile) Luis Pedro Figueroa
- (Chile) Braulio Leal
- (Chile) Rodrigo Millar
- (Chile) Jorge Valdivia
- (Colombia) Martín Arzuaga
- (Colombia) Álvaro Domínguez
- (Ecuador) Félix Borja
- (Ecuador) Luis Checa
- (Ecuador) José Luis Perlaza
- (Paraguay) Jorge Achucarro
- (Paraguay) José Devaca
- (Paraguay) Osvaldo Díaz
- (Paraguay) Pablo Giménez
- (Paraguay) Aureliano Torres
- (Peru) Alberto Junior Rodríguez
- (Uruguay) Sebastián García
- (Uruguay) Rubén Olivera
- (Uruguay) Nicolás Vigneri

Own goal

- (Colombia) Aquivaldo Mosquera (playing against Argentina)
