= Rubén Bascuñán =

Chilean footballer (born 1982)

Personal information
- Full name: Rubén Eduardo Bascuñán
- Date of birth: 23 February 1982 (age 44)
- Place of birth: Santiago, Chile
- Height: 1.72 m (5 ft 7 1/2 in)
- Position: Midfielder

Senior career*
Years	Team	Apps	(Gls)
2000–2001	Colo-Colo		
2002	Deportes Colchagua		
2003	Provincial Osorno		
2004	Deportes Temuco		
2005	Everton		
2006	Antofagasta		
2007–2008	Unión Española		
2009–2011	Antofagasta		

International career^{‡}
2001	Chile U-21	4	(1)
2004	Chile U-23		
- * Club domestic league appearances and goals as of 21:56, 4 February 2010 (UTC) ‡ National team caps and goals as of 21:56, 4 February 2010 (UTC)

Rubén Eduardo Bascuñán is a Chilean former footballer who last played in Antofagasta of the Second Division of Chile.

A product of Colo-Colo's youth system, he played mainly in lower-tier teams such as Deportes Colchagua of the third division of Chile, Provincial Osorno, Deportes Temuco, Everton, Antofagasta in two occasions, and Unión Española.

== International career ==
Due to his good performances in Provincial Osorno, Bascuñán was part of the Chilean U-23 squad that failed to qualify to the 2004 Olympics.
