= Neighel Drummond =

Costa Rican footballer (born 1982)

Personal information
- Full name: Neighel Drummond Morales
- Date of birth: February 2, 1982 (age 44)
- Place of birth: San José, Costa Rica
- Height: 1.81 m (5 ft 11 1/2 in)
- Position: Goalkeeper

Team information
- Current team: Puma

Youth career
- Saprissa

Senior career*
Years	Team	Apps	(Gls)
2001–2005	Alajuelense		
2003	→ Pérez Zeledón (loan)		
2005–2006	Saprissa		
2006–2007	Brujas		
2007–2008	Carmelita		
2008–2010	Ramonense		
2010	Cartaginés		
2011–2014	UCR		
2014–	Puma		
- * Club domestic league appearances and goals

Neighel Drummond Morales (born 2 February 1982) is a Costa Rican football player who, as of 2011 was playing as a goalkeeper for Puma in the Costa Rican Primera División.

== Club career ==
Drummond made his league debut on 25 May 2003 against Municipal Osa and has played as a goalkeeper for local sides Ramonense, Alajuelense and Cartaginés. In June 2003, Alajuelense player Drummond, who was on loan at Pérez Zeledón, suffered severe facial injuries sustained in a car accident and spent a few days on the intensive care unit.

After he left Saprissa in 2006 the club claimed Brujas owed them 4,000 dollars of transfer money.

In May 2010 he left Ramonense for Cartaginés and in January 2011 Drummond left Cartaginés for UCR.

== International career ==
Drummond played in the 2001 FIFA World Youth Championship held in Argentina.

He was a reserve goalkeeper for Costa Rica's 2004 Olympic football team, who exited in the quarter finals, having finished second in Group D.
