= Boucader Diallo =

Malian football player

Personal information
- Full name: Boucader Djadani Diallo
- Date of birth: 14 September 1984 (age 42)
- Place of birth: Mali
- Height: 1.80 m (5 ft 11 in)

Team information
- Current team: Al-Merreikh

Senior career*
Years	Team	Apps	(Gls)
2001–2008	Stade Malien		
2009	Al-Merreikh		
2009–2010	Stade Malien		
2010–2018	Al-Ahli Khartoum		

International career
2001	Mali	4	(0)
- * Club domestic league appearances and goals

Boucader Diallo (born 14 September 1984) is a Malian football player.

== Career ==
Diallo began his career with Stade Malien. In December 2008, he signed a 4-year transfer contract with Sudanese side Al-Merreikh.

== International career ==
He was part of the Mali squad at the 2001 FIFA U-17 World Championship and the U-20 team who finished third in group stage of 2003 FIFA World Youth Championship. He was part of the Malian 2004 Olympic football team, who exited in the quarter finals, finishing top of group A, but losing to Italy in the next round.
