= C.D. Clan Juvenil =

Ecuadorean football club

Clan Juvenil
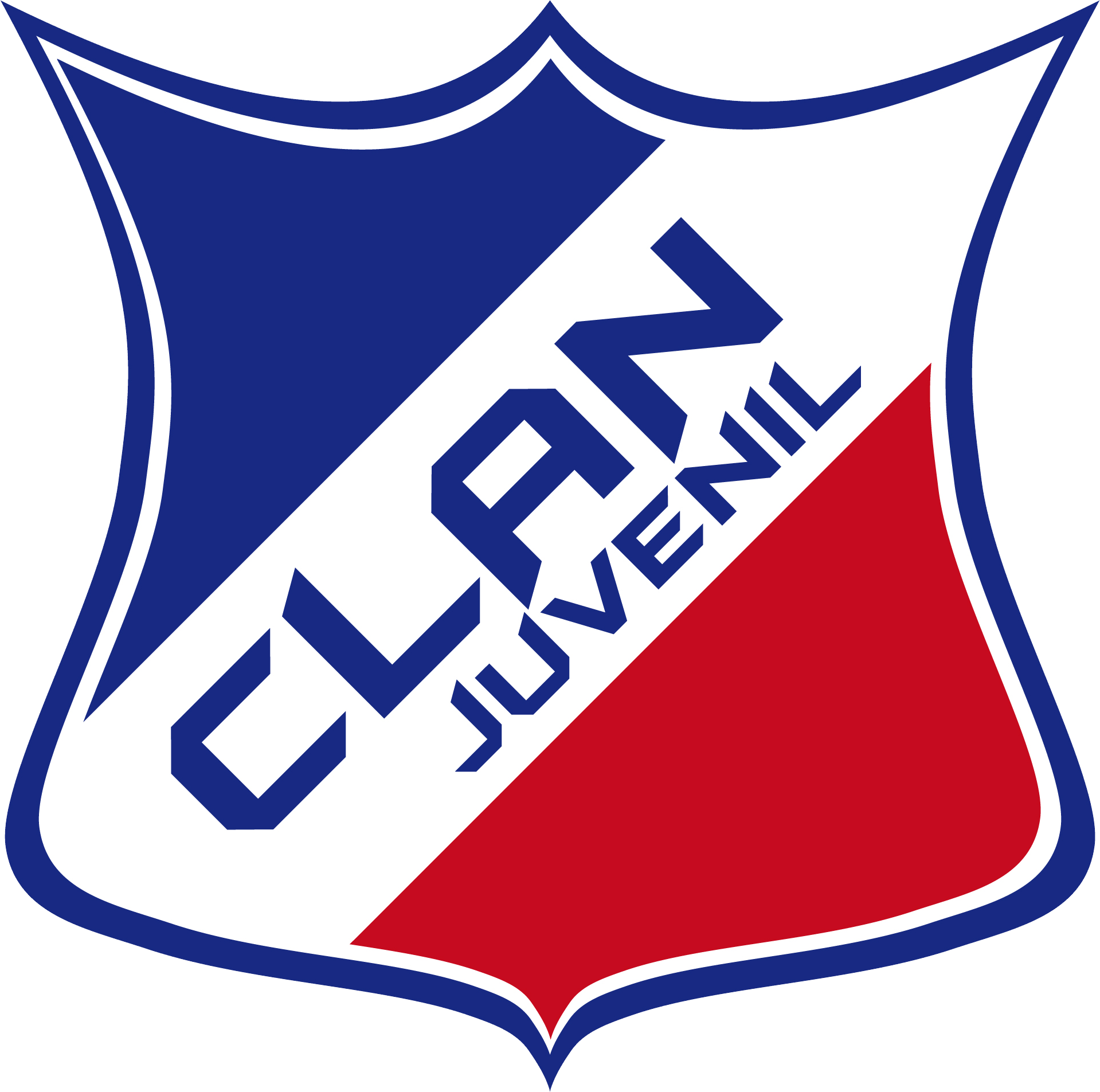
- Full name: Club Deportivo Clan Juvenil
- Nickname: 100% Sangolquileños
- Founded: February 15, 1973; 52 years ago
- Ground: Estadio Rumiñahui, Sangolquí, Ecuador
- Capacity: 7,233
- Chairman: Jorge Cevallos
- Manager: Julio Asad
- League: Serie B
- 2017: Serie A 11th (relegated)
Home colours	Away colours

Club Deportivo Clan Juvenil is an Ecuadorian professional football club based in Sangolquí. They currently play in the Serie A after gaining promotion from the Serie B.

== Current squad ==
Note: Flags indicate national team as defined under FIFA eligibility rules; some limited exceptions apply. Players may hold more than one non-FIFA nationality.

No.	Pos.	Nation	Player
1	GK	ECU	Wilmer Zumba
2	DF	ECU	Carlos Vayas
3	DF	ECU	Isaac Mina
5	DF	ECU	Andrés Mendoza
6	MF	ECU	Segundo Torres
7	FW	COL	Miguel Pérez
8	MF	ECU	Luis Moreira
9	MF	ECU	Carlos Quillupangui
10	MF	ECU	Marwin Pita

No.	Pos.	Nation	Player
11	FW	ECU	Juan Villacrés
12	MF	ECU	Julio Ortíz
14	FW	ECU	Jhonny Baldeón
17	FW	ECU	Narciso Mina
24	MF	ECU	Jorge Valencia
27	DF	ECU	Efrén Proaño
38	DF	ECU	Alejandro Espinoza
–	GK	ECU	Damián Lanza

== Honours ==
- Serie B de Ecuador
  - Runners-up (1): 2016

== Managers ==
- (Ecuador) Juan Carlos Garay (2016–2017)
- (Ecuador) Carlos Sevilla (2017–)
