= Aureliano Torres =

Paraguayan football player (born 1982)

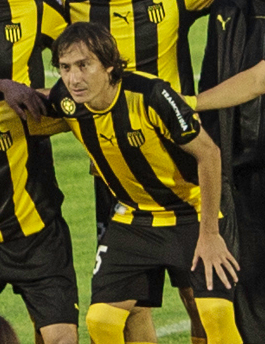

Personal information
- Full name: Aureliano Torres Román
- Date of birth: 16 June 1982 (age 44)
- Place of birth: Luque, Paraguay
- Height: 1.78 m (5 ft 10 in)
- Position: Left-back

Team information
- Current team: Olimpia (youth manager)

Senior career*
Years	Team	Apps	(Gls)
2001	Irapuato	0	(0)
2002	Kyoto Purple Sanga	4	(0)
2002–2003	Deportivo Recoleta	68	(5)
2003	Sol de América	24	(4)
2004–2006	Guaraní	55	(7)
2005–2006	→ Real Murcia (loan)	3	(0)
2007–2011	San Lorenzo	126	(9)
2011–2012	Toluca	28	(2)
2012–2013	Peñarol	16	(1)
2014	Sol de América	40	(3)
2015	12 de Octubre		
2016	Caacupé FBC		

International career
2004	Paraguay U23	13	(2)
2004–2011	Paraguay	47	(2)

Managerial career
- 2023: Sol de América (reserves)
- 2023–2024: Olimpia (reserves)
- 2024: Olimpia (interim)
- 2024: General Caballero JLM
- 2025–: Olimpia (youth)
- 2025: Olimpia (interim)
Medal record
Men's Football
Representing Paraguay
Olympic Games
Silver medal – second place	2004 Athens	Team competition
Copa América
Runner-up	2011 Argentina	Team
- * Club domestic league appearances and goals

Aureliano Torres Román (born 16 June 1982) is a Paraguayan football manager and former player who played as a left-back. He is the current manager of Olimpia's Main Team.

At club level, Torres achieved the 2002 Emperor's Cup in Japan, the Torneo Clausura of the 2006–07 Argentine Primera División and the 2012–13 Uruguayan Primera División of Uruguay, and with Paraguay he achieved the silver medal at the 2004 Summer Olympics Men's tournament and runners-up of the 2011 Copa América.

== Club career ==
Torres was born in Luque. In 2007 he joined San Lorenzo and in his debut season the club won the Clausura tournament. In spite of that, he has not had a good relationship with the supporters, due to his lukewarm performances.

Torres debuted for Sol de América in a 2–2 home draw against Club Rubio Ñú on 16 February 2014. He scored his first goal for Sol de América in a 2–1 home loss against Club Olimpia on 24 August 2014.

In 2015, he and Sol de América colleague Claudio Morel Rodríguez both joined 12 de Octubre of the Division Intermedia.

== International career ==
He scored two goals with Paraguay, the second against Ivory Coast on 30 May 2010.

=== 2004 Summer Olympics – Athens ===
Aged 22, Aureliano was selected by Paraguay U-23 coach Carlos Jara Saguier for the 2004 Summer Olympics Men's tournament, wearing the number# 11 shirt. Torres had previously participated at the 2004 CONMEBOL Men Pre-Olympic Tournament which saw Paraguay qualify for the Summer Olympics. Torres started in Paraguay's opening group-stage fixture against Japan on 12 August, where he played a full 90-minutes of the 4–3 win. Torres had a 25-yard full stretch shot saved by Japan's goal keeper Hitoshi Sogahata, a few minutes later, Torres got another sight of goal when, from 20-years, he shot the ball into the top corner of the net in the 62nd minute. Torres then featured in Paraguay's second match, a 2–1 defeat against Ghana on 15 August. Torres again played a full 90-minutes in Paraguay's third group-stage fixture on 18 August, providing an inch-perfect cross in the 14th minute for Fredy Bareiro to head the only goal in the 1–0 win against Italy, Torres received a yellow card in the 58th minute. Paraguay finished in first-place of Group B with six points, qualifying for the knockout stages. Torres played in Paraguay's 3–2 quarter-final win against South Korea on 21 August. He then played another 90-minutes in Paraguay's 3–1 semi-final win against Iraq on 24 August. Torres played a full 90-minutes in the final, a 1–0 loss against Argentina on 28 August, Torres received his second yellow card of the tournament in the 72nd minute. Upon finishing runners-up, Paraguay went on to claim silver-medals.

== Honours ==
=== Club ===
Kyoto Sanga

- Emperor's Cup (1): 2002

San Lorenzo

- Torneo de Apertura (1): 2007

Peñarol

- Uruguayan Primera División (1): 2012–13

=== International ===
- Silver medal (1): 2004
- Copa América (1): Runner–up 2011

=== Individual ===
- Domingo Martínez de Irala medal (1): 2010
- Condecoración Especial (1): 2010
