= Nicolás Medina =

Argentine footballer (born 1982)

Personal information
- Full name: Nicolás Rubén Medina
- Date of birth: 17 February 1982 (age 44)
- Place of birth: Buenos Aires, Argentina
- Height: 1.77 m (5 ft 10 in)
- Position: Central midfielder

Youth career
- 1997–1998: Argentinos Juniors

Senior career*
Years	Team	Apps	(Gls)
1999–2001	Argentinos Juniors	48	(1)
2001–2004	Sunderland	0	(0)
2003–2004	→ Leganés (loan)	32	(0)
2004–2005	Real Murcia	20	(2)
2005	Rosario Central	3	(0)
2006	Gimnasia La Plata	0	(0)
2006	→ Nueva Chicago (loan)	1	(0)
2007	→ Talleres Córdoba (loan)	9	(1)
2007–2008	Gimnasia La Plata	9	(0)
2009–2010	O'Higgins	23	(0)
2010	Tiro Federal	7	(0)
2011	La Piedad	2	(0)
2012–2013	El Porvenir	12	(0)
2013–2015	Unión Comercio	63	(1)
2015	Sport Huancayo	26	(0)
2016–2018	Independiente Rivadavia	14	(0)
Total		269	(5)

International career
2001	Argentina U20	7	(0)
2004	Argentina U23	8	(0)
2004	Argentina	1	(0)
Medal record
Olympic medal record
Representing Argentina
Men's Football
Gold medal – first place	2004 Athens	Team competition
- * Club domestic league appearances and goals

Nicolás Rubén Medina (born 17 February 1982) is an Argentine former professional footballer who primarily played as a central midfielder. He accomplished more in his international career, especially in his early years as a world champion at the 2001 FIFA U20 Youth Championship as well as a gold medal at the 2004 Olympics, than he has in his club career. His journeyman club career was chronicled by Fútbol Fútbol Fútbol, the South American football website.

== Club career ==
=== Argentinos Juniors ===
Born in Buenos Aires, Medina started his career as a heralded player at the youth level for Argentinos Juniors which also saw him capped at the national team youth level. He made his senior team debut on 3 September 1999 against Boca Juniors. He finished the 1999 Apertura with 11 games. He played 16 games in the 2000 Clausura. In the 2000 Apertura, he played 8 games and he played 13 games and scored his first goal in the 2001 Clausura on 11 February 2001 at home in a 2–2 tie against Boca Juniors.

=== Sunderland ===
In 2001, Medina signed for English Premier League team Sunderland A.F.C. for £3.5 million, joining up with Argentine youth team colleague Julio Arca. At his signing, manager Peter Reid hailed him as "a complete midfield player". While Arca had become an instant hit at the Stadium of Light, Medina failed to make it into the first team and spent most of his time at Sunderland in the reserve team. Both fans and the media began to speculate as to why such an expensive signing was not given a chance. This led to popular theories that he was suffering a serious illness or that he had fallen out with Reid. Neither rumour was proven. Medina briefly courted controversy early in his Sunderland career, after being quoted in an Argentine newspaper as saying that he was planning to live in Newcastle (home to Newcastle United, Sunderland's fiercest rivals) rather than in the City of Sunderland. When new Sunderland manager Howard Wilkinson took over at Sunderland, he did what Peter Reid had failed to do and publicly explained why Medina was not being picked for Sunderland, despite playing for the Argentina national football team. In an interview, he stated that: "The evidence suggests that Nicolas hasn't got it because the previous manager didn't pick him." Medina eventually left Sunderland having only played once for the first team; in an FA Cup tie against Bolton Wanderers (he was substituted in this game but the BBC described it as "an impressive debut"). He remains the most expensive Sunderland player to never play a first-team league game. Given that fact, he is recognized as one of Sunderland's worst transfers.

=== Spain ===
Due to the issues getting playing time at Sunderland A.F.C., Medina went on loan to CD Leganés in the Spain Segunda División for the 2003–2004 season, in which he played 32 games. For the 2004–2005 season, Sunderland let Medina leave the club on a loan which then turned into a free transfer and he returned to the Segunda División with Real Murcia. He played 20 games and scored 2 goals, both in a game against Málaga Club de Fútbol B on 16 October 2004.

=== Return to Argentina ===
He has returned to Argentina and played for Rosario Central in the 2005 Apertura playing 3 games. For the 2006 Clausura, he joined Gimnasia y Esgrima de La Plata, which promptly loaned him to Club Atlético Nueva Chicago playing 1 game in the 2006 Apertura. Midway through the 2007 Clausura, he went on loan to Talleres de Córdoba in Primera B Nacional where he became a starter and played 9 games and scored 1 goal (12 April – in a 2–1 loss to Club Atlético Huracán). For the 2007 Apertura, he returned to Gimnasia y Esgrima de La Plata playing 7 games. In February of the 2008 Clausura, Medina ruptured an achilles tendon, which sidelined him for the entire year.

=== Chile ===
Medina joined O'Higgins on 28 December 2008. He was a regular starter in the team's midfield in the 2009 Clausura, playing 11 games and then playing 12 games in the 2009 Apertura.

=== Back to Argentina ===
Medina returned once again to Argentina in 2010 for the Clausura and joined Tiro Federal in Primera B Nacional. He played 9 games that season.

=== Mexico ===
Prior to the 2011 Clausura, Medina joined C.F. La Piedad in Ascenso MX and made an auspicious start to his short-lived career in Mexico on 20 March 2011 when he was red-carded in his debut. He finished with just two games for C.F. La Piedad.

=== Return to Argentina ===
After a hiatus from playing after his time with C.F. La Piedad, Medina wanted to resume his career so he returned home and in August 2012 he joined El Porvenir in Primera C. He was bringing experience to a youthful team while he worked his way back into the game. He played 12 games in the 2012 Apertura before leaving the team in December 2012 to trial with the Philadelphia Union in Major League Soccer.

=== United States ===
In January 2013, Medina joined the pre-season camp of the Philadelphia Union in Major League Soccer as a trialist. He was the first player recruited into pre-season camp by the Union's Director of International Player Development, Ricardo Ansaldi, who has strong ties to one of Medina's former clubs, Tiro Federal.

== International career ==
Medina was part of the Argentine U17 team in the South American qualifiers hosted by Uruguay for the 1999 FIFA U17 World Cup; however, Argentina finished in 4th place and did not qualify. His performances saw him called up to train in Amsterdam with the full national team for a friendly in March 1999 against Netherlands.

He started all 7 games for the U20 team in the 2001 FIFA U20 World Cup in Argentina, including going 90 minutes in the final against Ghana. (in addition to 1st-round games against Finland, Egypt and Jamaica – round of 16 game against China, quarter-final against France and semi-final game against Paraguay). As part of that U20 World Championship team, Medina's performance was cited by FIFA in the tournament's Technical Report as follows – "Central midfielder Medina was a key player in the Argentine squad. He regularly won back possession and created balance when the team attacked. He moved around the pitch smoothly, and when he got the ball, automatically increased the pace of the game. He delivered one-two passes with great ease and precision" . Unlike many of his teammates, he would not be able to replicate that success at the national team level.

Medina was a starting member for Argentina in the 2004 South America Olympic qualification tournament held in Chile, where he played 5 games (1st-round games against Bolivia, Ecuador and Colombia as well as Final Stage games against Paraguay and Brazil). Medina was then part of the gold medal winning Argentine team at the 2004 Summer Olympics At the Olympics, he made 3 appearances as a substitute (1st-round game against Serbia and Montenegro, quarter-final game against Costa Rica as well as the semi-final game against Italy and was an unused substitute in the other 3 games, including the final against Paraguay.

He was called into the 2003 winter training camp in advance of three friendlies against CONCACAF opponents, although he did not play. Given Medina's positional versatility, he was brought in as a defender for this camp. In the Summer of 2004, he was part of the 2004 Copa América team but did not play in that tournament. On 4 September 2004, he made his only appearance for the Argentina national football team in a 2006 World Cup qualifier at Peru in which he made a late appearance (7 minutes) as a substitute in Argentina's 3–1 victory.

== Style of play ==
Medina has been deployed mostly as a central midfielder but has shown "adaptability to function in almost all positions in midfield" and has played as a defender at times in his career.

== Personal life ==
Medina also holds Italian nationality.

== Honours ==
=== International ===
Argentina

- FIFA World Youth Championship winner: 2001
- Men's Olympics Football tournament gold medal: 2004
- Copa América runner-up: 2004
