= Jhonny Baldeón =

Ecuadorian footballer (born 1981)

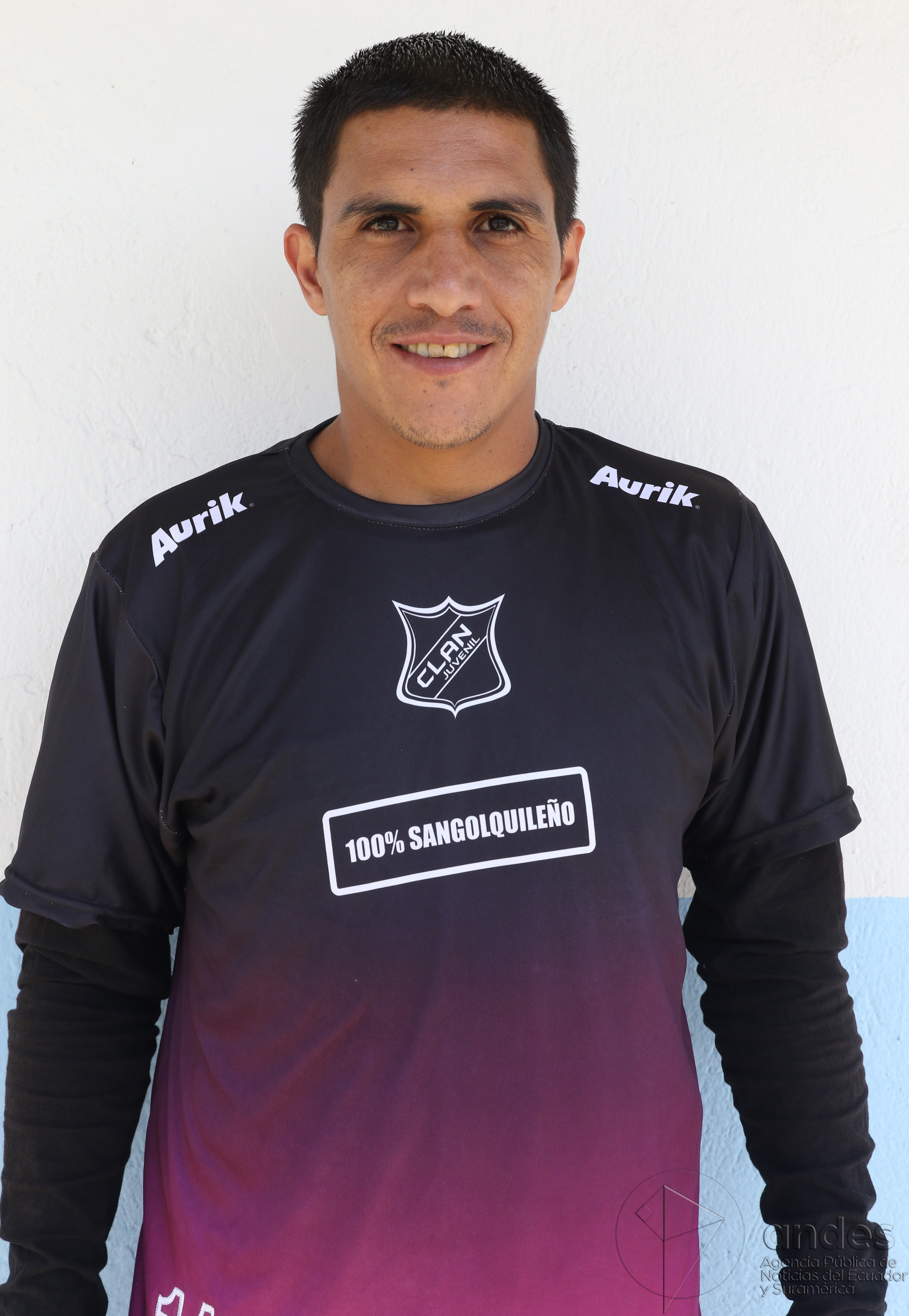

Personal information
- Full name: Jhonny Alejandro Baldeón Parreño
- Date of birth: June 15, 1981 (age 45)
- Place of birth: Sangolquí, Ecuador
- Height: 1.68 m (5 ft 6 in)
- Position: Midfielder

Youth career
- 1997–2000: Deportivo Quito

Senior career*
Years	Team	Apps	(Gls)
2001–2009	Deportivo Quito	201	(54)
2004	→ Alianza Lima (loan)	16	(5)
2005	→ Talleres de Córdoba (loan)	5	(1)
2006	→ Barcelona (loan)	34	(8)
2008	→ ESPOLI (loan)	20	(5)
2009–2013	Independiente del Valle	22	(1)
2011–2012	Macará	69	(9)
2015–2017	Clan Juvenil	86	(18)
2018	Cumbayá		

International career
2002–2006	Ecuador	12	(3)
Medal record
Deportivo Quito
Winner	Ecuadorian Serie A	2009
Clan Juvenil
Winner	Ecuadorian Serie B	2016
- * Club domestic league appearances and goals

Jhonny Alejandro Baldeón Parreño (born June 15, 1981) is an Ecuadorian association football midfielder who played in Argentina and Peru as well as in his native country.
