= Football at the 2004 Summer Olympics =

Football at the Games of the XXVIII Olympiad
- Football pictogram for the 2004 Summer Olympics

Event details
- Games: 2004 Summer Olympics
- Host country: Greece
- Dates: 11–28 August 2004
- Venues: 6 (in 6 host cities)
- Competitors: 425 from 22 nations

Men's tournament
- Teams: 16 (from 6 confederations)
Medalists
Gold	Argentina
Silver	Paraguay
Bronze	Italy

Women's tournament
- Teams: 10 (from 6 confederations)
Medalists
Gold	United States
Silver	Brazil
Bronze	Germany

Editions
- ← 2000 2008 →

The 2004 Football at the Summer Olympics tournament at the 2004 Summer Olympics started on 11 August (two days before the opening ceremony) and ended on 28 August.

The tournaments take place every four years, in conjunction with the Summer Olympic Games. The associations affiliated to FIFA are invited to participate with their men's U-23 and women's representative teams. The men's tournament allows up to three overage players to join the U-23 squads.

The men's tournament was won by Argentina, coached by Marcelo Bielsa, which held a record of having won every match without conceding a goal in the tournament. The Golden Boot was won by Argentina's Carlos Tevez. The women's tournament was won by the United States.

== Venues ==
- Olympic Stadium, Athens
- Karaiskakis Stadium, Piraeus
- Pankritio Stadium, Heraklion
- Pampeloponnisiako Stadium, Patras
- Kaftanzoglio Stadium, Thessaloniki
- Panthessaliko Stadium, Volos

Athens	Location of the host cities of the football at the 2004 Summer Olympics.	Patras
Olympic Stadium	Location of the host cities of the football at the 2004 Summer Olympics.	Pampeloponnisiako Stadium
Capacity: 71,030	Location of the host cities of the football at the 2004 Summer Olympics.	Capacity: 23,558
Piraeus	Location of the host cities of the football at the 2004 Summer Olympics.	Thessaloniki
Karaiskakis Stadium	Location of the host cities of the football at the 2004 Summer Olympics.	Kaftanzoglio Stadium
Capacity: 33,334	Location of the host cities of the football at the 2004 Summer Olympics.	Capacity: 27,770
Heraklion	Location of the host cities of the football at the 2004 Summer Olympics.	Volos
Pankritio Stadium	Location of the host cities of the football at the 2004 Summer Olympics.	Panthessaliko Stadium
Capacity: 26,240	Location of the host cities of the football at the 2004 Summer Olympics.	Capacity: 22,700

== Men ==
Event	Gold	Silver	Bronze
Men's football	Argentina; Roberto Ayala; Nicolás Burdisso; Willy Caballero; Fabricio Coloccini; César Delgado; Andrés D'Alessandro; Leandro Fernández; Luciano Figueroa; Kily González; Lucho González; Mariano González; Gabriel Heinze; Germán Lux; Javier Mascherano; Nicolás Medina; Clemente Rodríguez; Mauro Rosales; Javier Saviola; Carlos Tevez; Coach: Marcelo Bielsa	Paraguay; Rodrigo Romero; Emilio Martínez; Julio Manzur; Carlos Gamarra; José Devaca; Celso Esquivel; Pablo Giménez; Edgar Barreto; Fredy Barreiro; Diego Figueredo; Aureliano Torres; Pedro Benítez; Julio César Enciso; Julio González; Ernesto Cristaldo; Osvaldo Díaz; José Cardozo; Diego Barreto; Coach: Carlos Jara Saguier	Italy; Marco Amelia; Andrea Barzagli; Daniele Bonera; Cesare Bovo; Giorgio Chiellini; Daniele De Rossi; Simone Del Nero; Marco Donadel; Matteo Ferrari; Andrea Gasbarroni; Alberto Gilardino; Emiliano Moretti; Giandomenico Mesto; Angelo Palombo; Ivan Pelizzoli; Giampiero Pinzi; Andrea Pirlo; Giuseppe Sculli; Coach: Claudio Gentile

== Women ==
Event	Gold	Silver	Bronze
Women's football	United States; Briana Scurry; Heather Mitts; Christie Rampone; Cat Reddick; Lindsay Tarpley; Brandi Chastain; Shannon Boxx; Angela Hucles; Mia Hamm; Aly Wagner; Julie Foudy; Cindy Parlow; Kristine Lilly; Joy Fawcett; Kate Markgraf; Abby Wambach; Heather O'Reilly; Kristin Luckenbill; Coach: April Heinrichs	Brazil; Andréia; Maravilha; Mônica; Tânia; Juliana; Daniela; Rosana; Renata Costa; Aline; Formiga; Elaine; Maycon; Pretinha; Marta; Cristiane; Roseli; Dayane; Grazielle; Coach: Renê Simões	Germany; Silke Rottenberg; Kerstin Stegemann; Kerstin Garefrekes; Steffi Jones; Sarah Günther; Viola Odebrecht; Pia Wunderlich; Petra Wimbersky; Birgit Prinz; Renate Lingor; Martina Müller; Navina Omilade; Sandra Minnert; Isabell Bachor; Sonja Fuss; Conny Pohlers; Ariane Hingst; Nadine Angerer; Coach: Tina Theune-Meyer

== FIFA Fair play award ==
=== Women's tournament ===
- Japan
- Sweden
