= Zied Bhairi =

Tunisian footballer (born 1981)

Personal information
- Full name: Zied Bhairi
- Date of birth: 5 February 1971 (age 55)
- Place of birth: Tunis, Tunisia
- Height: 1.83 m (6 ft 0 in)
- Position: Defender

Senior career*
Years	Team	Apps	(Gls)
2006–2008	Espérance Sportive de Tunis	19	(0)
2008	SpVgg Greuther Fürth	0	(0)
2008	Gloria Bistriţa	1	(0)
2010	Tahaddy		

International career^{‡}
2003	Tunisia	1	(0)
- * Club domestic league appearances and goals as of 22 May 2009 ‡ National team caps and goals as of 5 June 2008

Zied Bhairi (born 5 February 1981) is a Tunisian footballer. He currently plays for the Libyan Premier League club Tahaddy.

Bhairi has a brief spell with SpVgg Greuther Fürth but did not appear in any 2. Bundesliga matches.

== International ==
He was part of the Tunisian 2004 Olympic football team, who exited in the first round, finishing third in group C, behind group and gold medal winners Argentina and runners-up Australia.
