= Gustavo Méndez (referee) =

Uruguayan football referee

Gustavo Méndez (born November 24, 1967) is an association football referee from Uruguay, best known for supervising two matches at the 2004 Copa América in Peru. He also led four games during the 2006 FIFA World Cup qualification in South America.
