= Julio Manzur =

Paraguayan footballer (born 1981)

Personal information
- Full name: Julio César Manzur Caffarena
- Date of birth: 22 January 1981 (age 45)
- Place of birth: Asunción, Paraguay
- Height: 1.86 m (6 ft 1 in)
- Position: Centre back

Youth career
- 1996–2000: Cerro Corá

Senior career*
Years	Team	Apps	(Gls)
2000–2002	Cerro Corá	16	(1)
2002–2007	Guaraní	154	(8)
2006	→ Santos (loan)	40	(2)
2007–2009	Pachuca	19	(2)
2009	→ Libertad (loan)	44	(0)
2009	→ Tigre (loan)	11	(0)
2010	Olimpia Asunción	11	(3)
2011	León	28	(0)
2011–2012	Guaraní	13	(3)
2013–2014	Olimpia Asunción	32	(2)
2015	Rubio Ñu	20	(4)

International career^{‡}
2004	Paraguay U23		
2004–2012	Paraguay	32	(1)
Medal record
Men's Football
Representing Paraguay
Summer Olympics
Silver medal – second place	2004 Athens	Team
- * Club domestic league appearances and goals as of 5 January 2016 ‡ National team caps and goals as of 17 April 2013

Julio César Manzur Caffarena (born 22 January 1981) is a Paraguayan former footballer who last played for Rubio Ñu of the Paraguayan Primera División.

== Club career ==
Manzur started his career at Cerro Corá in his native country before moving to Paraguayan Guaraní. He also played for Santos F.C. in Brazil, C.F. Pachuca in Mexico and Libertad in his native country.

In 2009, he joined Tigre to play in the Primera División Argentina and the Copa Sudamericana.

In 2010, he joined Club Olimpia from Paraguay, to play the National Tournament of that country, scoring his first goal on 13 March, against 3 de Febrero from Ciudad del Este, which allowed his team to win the match. He then returned to Mexico to play for Second Division side Club León, to replace Paraguayan international and partner Denis Caniza. León is owned by Grupo Pachuca, owners of his previous club Pachuca CF. Manzur returned to his former club Guaraní in 2011 and then returned to Paraguayan giants Olimpia in January 2013.

== International career ==
Manzur was part of the silver medal-winning Paraguay national team on the 2004 Summer Olympics. On 4 August, before the Summer Olympics began, he played in a preparation game against the Portugal of Cristiano Ronaldo in the city of Algarve, resulting in a 5–0 defeat.

He was also selected to participate in the 2006 FIFA World Cup and the 2007 Copa América. He has won 26 caps for the Paraguay national side.

== Personal life ==
Manzur is of Lebanese descent.

== Honours ==
=== Club ===
- Santos F.C.
  - Campeonato Paulista: 2006
- C.F. Pachuca
  - North American SuperLiga: 2007
  - CONCACAF Champions League: 2008

=== National team ===
- Paraguay
  - Olympic Games: Silver Medal in Athens (2004)
