= José Devaca =

Paraguayan footballer (born 1982)

Personal information
- Full name: José Ricardo Devaca Sánchez
- Date of birth: 18 September 1982 (age 44)
- Place of birth: Capiatá, Paraguay
- Height: 1.80 m (5 ft 11 in)
- Position: Centre back

Team information
- Current team: Banfield

Senior career*
Years	Team	Apps	(Gls)
2000–2001	Cerro Porteño	8	(0)
2001–2002	Udinese Calcio	0	(0)
2002	Cerro Porteño	13	(1)
2002–2003	San Lorenzo	13	(0)
2003	Cerro Porteño	19	(1)
2004–2005	Udinese Calcio	0	(0)
2005	Libertad	21	(0)
2006	Cerro Porteño	15	(2)
2006	Godoy Cruz	37	(1)
2007–2012	Banfield	65	(2)
2012–2013	Rubio Ñú	10	(0)
2013–	Banfield	7	(0)

International career^{‡}
2004	Paraguay U23		
2004–	Paraguay	2	(0)
- * Club domestic league appearances and goals as of 6 August 2011 ‡ National team caps and goals as of 19 December 2010

Olympic medal record

Men's Football
Silver medal – second place	2004 Athens	Team competition

José Ricardo Devaca Sánchez (born 18 September 1982) is a Paraguayan former footballer who last played for Banfield of the Argentine Primera División.

== Club career ==
Devaca started his career at Cerro Porteño in 2000. In 2001, he moved to Italy to play for Udinese, before returning to Paraguay to play again for Cerro Porteño in 2002. That same year, he moved to Argentina to play for Lorenzo, before moving back to Paraguay in 2003 for a third spell at Cerro Porteño. In 2004, he once again moved to Italy and Udinese, returning again to Paraguay in 2005, this time to play for Libertad. In 2006, he had a fourth spell at Cerro Porteño, before moving to Argentina again, to play for Godoy Cruz. In 2007, he moved to Banfield where he was part of the squad that won the Apertura 2009 championship, helping Banfield to win the Argentine league championship for the first time in its history.

== International career ==
Devaca made his senior international debut on July 24 at the age of 21.8 years. Devaca was a member of the Paraguayan squad at the 2001 FIFA World Youth Championship and part of the silver medal-winning Paraguayan football team at the 2004 Summer Olympics. On 4 August, before the Summer Olympics began, he played in a preparation game against the Portugal of Cristiano Ronaldo in the city of Algarve, resulting in a 5–0 defeat.

== Honours ==
Banfield

- Primera División Argentina: Apertura 2009
