= Ernesto Cristaldo =

Paraguayan footballer (born 1984)

Personal information
- Full name: Ernesto Rubén Cristaldo Santa Cruz
- Date of birth: 16 March 1984 (age 42)
- Place of birth: Asunción, Paraguay
- Height: 1.71 m (5 ft 7 in)
- Position: Left winger

Senior career*
Years	Team	Apps	(Gls)
2004–2008	Cerro Porteño	144	(18)
2008–2009	Newell's Old Boys	13	(1)
2009–2010	Cerro Porteño	17	(0)
2011	Sol de América	14	(1)
2011	Cúcuta Deportivo	12	(0)
2012–2016	The Strongest	133	(28)
2016–2017	Nacional	6	(0)
2017	Capiatá	3	(0)
2018	Royal Pari	13	(0)

International career
2002–2003	Paraguay U20	2	(0)
2004	Paraguay U23		
2004	Paraguay	3	(1)
- * Club domestic league appearances and goals as of 02:32, 3 January 2021 (UTC)

Olympic medal record

Representing Paraguay

Men's Football
Silver medal – second place	2004 Athens	Team competition

Ernesto Cristaldo (born 16 March 1984) is a Paraguayan footballer.

== Club career ==
Cristaldo began his playing career in 2004 with Cerro Porteño, between 2008 and 2009 he played for Newell's Old Boys of Argentina before returning to Cerro Porteño. On 6 January 2011, he moved to Sol de América, before he moved to Colombian side Cúcuta Deportivo in August 2011. Cristaldo moved to Bolivian ex-champions The Strongest in January 2012.

== International career ==
Cristaldo played for Paraguay at the 2003 FIFA World Youth Championship and the 2004 Olympics, where he won a silver medal. On 4 August, before the Summer Olympics began, he played in a preparation game against the Portugal of Cristiano Ronaldo in the city of Algarve, resulting in a 5–0 defeat.

== Honors ==
Cerro Porteño

- Paraguayan Primera División
  - Winner: 2004, 2005, 2009 Apertura
  - Runner-up: 2006

The Strongest

- Bolivian Primera División
  - Winner: 2011–12 Clausura, 2012–13 Apertura, 2013–14 Apertura
  - Runner-up: 2014–15 Clausura, 2015–16 Clausura

Paraguay

- Football at the Summer Olympics runner-up: 2004
