= Diego Barreto =

Paraguayan footballer (born 1981)

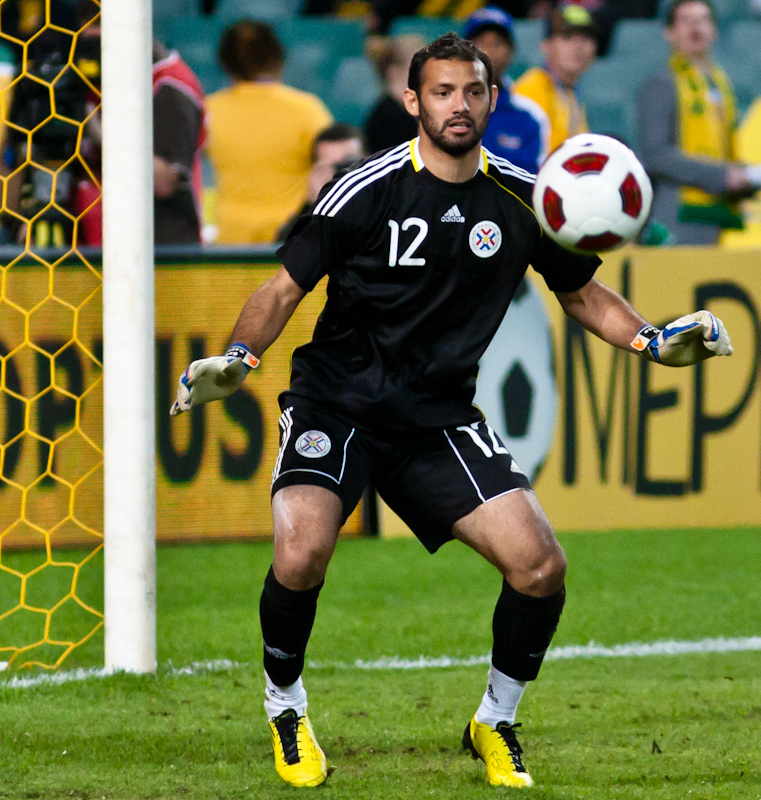
- Barreto playing for Paraguay in 2010

Personal information
- Full name: Diego Daniel Barreto Cáceres
- Date of birth: 16 July 1981 (age 45)
- Place of birth: Lambaré, Paraguay
- Height: 1.83 m (6 ft 0 in)
- Position: Goalkeeper

Youth career
- 1996–2004: Cerro Porteño

Senior career*
Years	Team	Apps	(Gls)
2003–2007	Cerro Porteño	86	(0)
2005	→ Almería (loan)	0	(0)
2007	Newell's Old Boys	0	(0)
2008	→ Cerro Porteño (loan)	4	(0)
2008	Locarno	1	(0)
2009	Sol de América	19	(0)
2009–2015	Cerro Porteño	175	(0)
2015–2018	Olimpia Asunción	62	(0)
2018	General Díaz	29	(0)
2019	Sportivo Luqueño	14	(0)

International career
2001	Paraguay U20	?	(?)
2004	Paraguay U23	?	(?)
2004–2017	Paraguay	13	(0)
Medal record
Representing Paraguay
Copa América
Runner-up	2011 Argentina	Team
Olympic Games
Silver medal – second place	2004 Athens	Team competition
- * Club domestic league appearances and goals as of 17:53, 27 July 2020 (UTC)

Diego Daniel Barreto Cáceres (born 16 July 1981) is a Paraguayan former professional footballer who played as a goalkeeper.

Diego is the brother of fellow Paraguayan footballer Édgar Barreto.

== Career ==
Barreto started his career with the club Cerro Porteño, where he was trained by Modesto Sandoval and was teammates with Aldo Bobadilla. He developed in the youth divisions of Cerro.

Barreto was part of the silver medal-winning Paraguay national team in the 2004 Olympics. Paraguay booked a quarter-final place with two victories in the qualifying group. The squad finished first, and then beat South Korea in the quarter-finals and Iraq in the semi-finals, before losing to Argentina in the final.

In 2007, Barreto had a spell with Newell's Old Boys in Argentina, but failed to break into the first team, returning to Paraguay in January 2008. However, he signed again for the Paraguayan team in July 2008.

He also holds an Italian passport.

In 2008, he spent a month with FC Locarno. He played in only one match, allowing four goals in the derby against FC Lugano. Barreto since returned to Cerro Porteño.

In July 2015 after not having his contract renewed Barreto moved to Cerro´s archrivals Club Olimpia.

== International career ==
On 4 August, before the Summer Olympics began, he played in a preparation game against the Portugal of Cristiano Ronaldo in the city of Algarve, resulting in a 5–0 defeat.

== Honours ==
Cerro Porteño

- Paraguayan Primera División: 2004, 2005, 2012 Apertura

Paraguay U-23

- Silver Medal at the Summer Olympics: 2004 Athens

== See also ==
- Players and Records in Paraguayan Football
