= Celso Esquivel =

Paraguayan footballer (born 1981)

Personal information
- Full name: Celso Esquivel González
- Date of birth: 20 March 1981 (age 45)
- Place of birth: General Artigas, Paraguay
- Height: 1.76 m (5 ft 9 in)
- Position: Right back

Team information
- Current team: Club Almagro

Senior career*
Years	Team	Apps	(Gls)
1999–2008	San Lorenzo	50	(1)
2006–2007	→ Racing Club (loan)	15	(0)
2008	Sportivo Luqueño	10	(0)
2008–2009	Talleres	17	(0)
2009	Sportivo Luqueño	15	(0)
2010–2011	Juventud Unida Universitario	20	(0)
2011–2012	Alvarado (Mar del Plata)	33	(3)
2012–2013	Sol de América (Formosa)	18	(3)
2013	Los Andes	0	(0)
2013	Sportivo Carapeguá	6	(0)
2014	Dock Sud	18	(0)
2015	Almagro	36	(0)
2016–2017	Atlético Uruguay	13	(0)

International career
2004	Paraguay U23	?	(?)
2004	Paraguay	1	(0)
Medal record
Men's Football
Representing Paraguay
Summer Olympics
Silver medal – second place	2004 Athens	Team
- * Club domestic league appearances and goals as of 26 July 2010

Celso Esquivel González (born 20 March 1981) is a Paraguayan footballer who is currently playing for Club Almagro of the Primera B Metropolitana in Argentina..

== Club career ==
Esquivel played in Argentina for San Lorenzo, Racing Club and Talleres. In his native country he did exclusively for Sportivo Luqueño.

== International career ==
Esquivel was a member of the Paraguayan squad at the 2001 FIFA World Youth Championship and was part of the silver medal-winning Paraguayan 2004 Olympic football team. On 4 August, before the Summer Olympics began, he played in a preparation game against the Portugal of Cristiano Ronaldo in the city of Algarve, resulting in a 5–0 defeat.

== Honours ==
Paraguay U23

  - Olympic Games: (silver) in Athens (2004)
