= Fredy Bareiro =

Paraguayan footballer (born 1982)

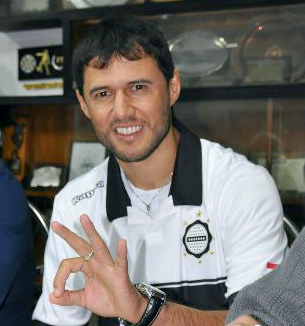

Personal information
- Full name: Fredy José Bareiro Gamarra
- Date of birth: 27 March 1982 (age 44)
- Place of birth: Itauguá, Paraguay
- Height: 1.82 m (6 ft 0 in)
- Position: Striker

Youth career
- 12 de Octubre

Senior career*
| Years | Team | Apps | (Gls) |
| 2001–2003 | 12 de Octubre | 32 | (7) |
| 2003–2004 | Libertad | 47 | (22) |
| 2005–2006 | Saturn Moscow | 41 | (7) |
| 2007 | Libertad | 14 | (4) |
| 2007–2008 | Léon | 42 | (30) |
| 2008–2012 | Estudiantes Tecos | 57 | (19) |
| 2011 | → Cerro Porteño (loan) | 37 | (15) |
| 2012–2013 | Olimpia Asunción | 33 | (13) |
| 2013 | Libertad | 9 | (2) |
| 2014 | Nacional Asunción | 27 | (4) |
| 2015–2017 | Olimpia Asunción | 69 | (20) |
| 2017 | Nacional Asunción | 24 | (3) |
| 2018 | Sportivo Luqueño | 31 | (4) |
| 2019 | General Díaz | 8 | (1) |

International career
| 2001 | Paraguay U20 | 6 | (0) |
| 2004 | Paraguay U23 | | (6) |
| 2002–2011 | Paraguay | 19 | (2) |
Medal record
Men's Football
| Silver medal – second place | 2004 Athens | Team competition |
- * Club domestic league appearances and goals

Fredy José Bareiro Gamarra (born 27 March 1982) is a Paraguayan former footballer.

Bareiro is one of very few footballers to have participated in back-to-back finals of the Copa Libertadores, playing for Olimpia Asunción in the 2013 final and for Nacional Asunción in the 2014 final.

He is the fourth maximum goal scorer of Paraguayan football with 112 goals.

Bareiro has represented Paraguay at under-20, under-23, and full international level, participating at the 2001 FIFA World Youth Championship, 2004 CONMEBOL Men Pre-Olympic Tournament, 2004 Copa América and the 2004 Summer Olympics, earning silver medals at the latter.

== Club career ==
=== 12 de Octubre ===
==== 2001 season ====
During the 2001 Paraguayan Primera División season, Bareiro scored his first two goals for 12 de Octubre in Round 8 of the Torneo Apertura. 12 de Octubre had faced Cerro Porteño on 6 May 2001 in a fixture which saw Bareiro scored a 31st-minute equalizer (1–0) and a 38th-minute goal which gave 12 de Octubre a 2–1 lead. The match eventually concluded 3–2 in favor of Cerro Porteño. In Round 5 of the Torneo Clasura, Bareiro scored in the 1st minute of a 3–0 home victory against Sportivo San Lorenzo on 2 September. One week later, Bareiro scored in the 53rd minute of a 4–1 home victory against Sportivo Luqueño on 9 September. During the pre-2002 Copa Libertadores stage, Bareiro netted a first half double in a 2–0 home victory against Club Guaraní on 22 December, scoring in the 13th minute and 42nd minute. Due to the win against Guaraní, 12 de Octubre eventually qualified for the 2002 Copa Libertadores.

==== 2002 season ====
Bareiro scored his first goal of the 2002 Paraguayan Primera División season in Round 6 during a 1–1 home draw against Sportivo San Lorenzo on 8 March. Bareiro equalized for 12 de Octubre in the 42nd minute of the first-half. In the Torneo Clasura, Bareiro scored his first goal in a 2–1 home loss against Deportivo Recoleta in Round 4 on 28 July. In Round 7, Bareiro netted the only goal in a 1–0 away victory against Sportivo Luqueño on 18 August. The goal came in the 79th minute of the match. In Round 13, Bareiro opened the scoring for 12 de Octubre in the 41st minute of a 3–0 away victory against Deportivo Recoleta on 5 October. In Round 16, Bareiro scored a double in a 2–1 home victory against Sportivo Luqueño on 20 October. The win would keep 12 de Octubre in the title race until the club ultimately concluded the competition as champions of the Clasura tournament and qualified for the 2003 Copa Libertadores.

==== 2003 season ====
In the 2003 Copa Libertadores, 12 de Octubre were drawn with Brazil's Santos, Colombia's América de Cali and Ecuador's El Nacional. On 5 February, Bareiro scored in the 38th minute of a 3–1 home victory against El Nacional. Bareiro opened the scoring for 12 de Octubre in the 38th minute. On 20 February, Bareiro netted in the 3rd minute for 12 de Octubre against Santos, initially giving his side the lead until they were defeated 3–1 away in Brazil. Despite the result, Bareiro had netted two goals in two Copa Libertadores appearances. Bareiro scored his first goal of the 2003 Paraguayan Primera División season in the 26th minute of a 1–1 away draw against Sol de America on 28 February. During the half way stage of the competition, Bareiro was transferred to Club Libertad.

=== Libertad ===
==== 2003 season ====
Bareiro scored his first goal of the 2003 Torneo Clasura in Round 1 during a fixture against Sportivo San Lorenzo on 16 June. Bareiro netted in the 34th minute as Libertad would win 4–2 at home. One week later, Bareiro scored in the 15th minute of the first half in a 3–1 home victory against former club 12 de Octubre on 22 June. In Round 8, Bareiro scored a hat-trick in a 4–2 away victory against Tacuary on 10 August. He netted in the 6th minute, a penalty in the 49th minute, and ultimately in the 54th minute.

During the first stage of the 2003 Copa Sudamericana, Bareiro scored a 25th-minute penalty against Club Guaraní on 14 August. Due to an aggregate score over both fixtures resulted in a tie, Libertad won 4–2 on penalties and advanced to the next round and were eliminated by Argentina's River Plate.

In Round 13, Bareiro opened the scoring for Libertad in the 35th minute in a fixture against Sol de América on 19 September. Libertad were ultimately defeated 2–1. In Round 17, Bareiro opened the scoring for Libertad in the 48th minute of a 3–0 home victory against Tacuary on 17 October. On the final day of the season in Round 18, Bareiro netted an equalizer for Libertad in the 36th minute to tie the score at 1–1 against with Olimpia on 26 October. Libertad ultimately took the lead in the 55th minute, winning the tie and finished in first place with Olimpia as both clubs had obtained 33 points. A Clasura play-off fixture was required, which saw Libertad defeat Olimpia 6–5 on penalties (after a 0–0 draw) seeing them crowned as champions of the Torneo Clasura and qualifying for the 2004 Copa Libertadores.

==== 2004 season ====
Bareiro scored his first goal of the 2004 Paraguayan Primera División season in a 4–1 away victory against 12 de Octubre on 15 February in the Torneo Apertura. Bareiro scored his second goal of the campaign in Round 4, during a 2–1 away victory against Sol de América on 29 February. One week later, Bareiro registed his third league goal in a 4–1 home thrashing against Olimpia on 5 March. In the following fixture, Bareiro scored four goals in a 6–0 away thrashing of Guaraní on 14 March. Another week later, Bareiro scored a double in a 6–1 home thrashing against Sportivo Luqueño on 24 March. His goal scoring record totaled to 8 goals in four consecutive league matches. Bareiro would not score again until Round 12, with a 64th-minute equalizer which gave Libertad a 2–2 draw with Cerro Porteño on 18 April. His last goals of the Torneo Apertura came in a 3–0 home victory against Guaraní on 9 June, when he scored a double, netting in the 29th minute and the 68th minute of the match. Bareiro's first goals of the Torneo Clasura came in a 3–0 home victory against Nacional on 22 September, as he scored a goal in each half to help give Libertad the victory.

=== Latter career ===
After the Olympics Bareiro moved to the Russian side FC Saturn and in 2007 he returned to Paraguay to play for Club Libertad. He later moved to Mexico to play with Leon on the Mexican Primera Division A, being the team topscorer.

In 2008, he moved to Tecos UAG, and in 2011 he moved to Cerro Porteño, he scored his first goal on 23 February 2011 against 3 de Febrero, in his 3rd soccer game with Cerro Porteño. He is currently playing for Club Nacional.

On 19 December 2014, Bareiro signed with Olimpia Asunción for the 2015 season.

== International career ==
=== Paraguay U20 ===
Bareiro was selected in Paraguay's 20-man squad for the 2001 FIFA World Youth Championship held in Argentina. He was registered with the number No. 16 shirt and was the only player from his respective club, 12 de Octubre, to be selected in the squad. Drawn into Group F with Ghana, France and Iran, Bareiro would first appear in the tournament in Paraguay's opening fixture, a 2–1 loss against Ghana on 18 June. Bareiro was substituted onto the field in the 86th minute for Santiago Salcedo. Bareiro would miss the next fixture, a 2–2 draw with France, before being in the starting eleven and playing a full 90-minutes of Paraguay's third and final group stage fixture, a 2–0 victory against Iran on 24 June. During the match, Bareiro received a yellow card in the 64th minute. Paraguay finished in third place with 4 points, advancing to the knock-out stages as the first of six third placed teams. On 28 June, Paraguay defeated Ukraine 2–1 in their Round of 16 clash which saw Bareiro play a full 90-minutes of the fixture. Bareiro would again be in the starting line up and play out the entire match of Paraguay's quarter-final fixture, a 1–0 victory over Czech Republic on 1 July. On 4 July, Paraguay were defeated 6–0 against hosts Argentina was Bareiro was again in the starting line up and substituted off of the field in the 81st minute for forward Cristian Fatecha. On 8 July, Paraguay concluded the tournament being defeated 1–0 against Egypt in the Third place play-off, as Bareiro played a full 90-minutes of the fixture, receiving his second yellow card of the competition in the 58th minute.

=== Paraguay U23 ===
==== 2004 CONMEBOL Men Pre-Olympic Tournament ====
In 2004, Bareiro was selected for Paraguay's U23 squad to participate at the 2004 CONMEBOL Men Pre-Olympic Tournament held in January in Chile. He joined an all under-23 squad contained with domestic footballers in Paraguay's Primera División. Paraguay, being drawn into Group A with hosts Chile, alongside Brazil, Uruguay and Venezuela, had earned 3 points out of three matches, sitting in third place, and would face Uruguay in their last fixture, who were in fourth position with 2 points, as Paraguay needed at least one point to advance to the next round. On 15 January, the final group stage fixture was played which saw the two teams tied at 1–1 until the 85th minute which was when Bareiro netted the winner to give Paraguay the lead and 3 points to advance to the next round.

On 18 January, Paraguay faced a play-off against Ecuador who had been in Group B, the winner would advance to the final stage of the tournament. The match had been locked at 0–0 and was decided via a penalty shoot-out, which saw Bareiro convert Paraguay's third penalty as they would win the shoot-out 4–2 and advance to the final stage of the competition.

The final stage of the competition saw Paraguay grouped with hosts Chile, as well as Brazil and Argentina, with the top two teams qualifying for the 2004 Olympics. On 21 January, Paraguay faced Chile in a match which saw Chile take the lead in the 62nd minute. Paraguay scored two goals in the space of three minutes to win the match 2–1, as Bareiro had scored the equalizer in the 80th minute before Paraguay scored the winner in the 82nd minute. Paraguay were then defeated against Argentina (2–1) before beating Brazil (1–0), finishing in second place with 6 points and qualifying for the 2004 Summer Olympics.

==== 2004 Summer Olympics ====
He played for Paraguay at the 2004 Summer Olympics, helping them to a silver medal by being the second top-scorer of the team behind José Cardozo. On 4 August, before the Summer Olympics began, he played in a preparation game against the Portugal of Cristiano Ronaldo in the city of Algarve, resulting in a 5–0 defeat.

=== Paraguay ===
He has won 19 caps for the Paraguay national football team, and he has scored 2 goals.

== Career statistics ==
=== International goals ===
==== Paraguay U23 ====
Score and Result list Paraguay's goal tally first.

| # | Date | Venue | Opponent | Score | Result | Competition |
|---|---|---|---|---|---|---|
| 1. | 15 January 2004 | Estadio Municipal de Concepción, Concepción, Chile | Uruguay | 2–1 | 2–1 | 2004 CONMEBOL Men Pre-Olympic Tournament |
| 2. | 21 January 2004 | Estadio Elías Figueroa Brander, Valparaíso, Chile | Chile | 1–1 | 2–1 | 2004 CONMEBOL Men Pre-Olympic Tournament |
| 3. | 18 August 2004 | Karaiskakis Stadium, Piraeus, Greece | Italy | 1–0 | 1–0 | 2004 Summer Olympics |
| 4. | 21 August 2004 | Kaftanzoglio Stadium, Thessaloniki, Greece | South Korea | 1–0 | 3–2 | 2004 Summer Olympics |
| 5. | 21 August 2004 | Kaftanzoglio Stadium, Thessaloniki, Greece | South Korea | 3–0 | 3–2 | 2004 Summer Olympics |
| 6. | 24 August 2004 | Kaftanzoglio Stadium, Thessaloniki, Greece | Iraq | 3–0 | 3–1 | 2004 Summer Olympics |

==== Paraguay ====
Score and Result list Paraguay's goal tally first.

| # | Date | Venue | Opponent | Score | Result | Competition |
|---|---|---|---|---|---|---|
| 1. | 19 September 2002 | Takhti Stadium, Tabriz, Iran | Iran | 1–0 | 1–1 (3–4 on penalties) | 2002 LG Cup |
| 2. | 14 July 2004 | Estadio Monumental Virgen de Chapi, Arequipa, Peru | Brazil | 2–1 | 2–1 | 2004 Copa América |

== Honours ==
12 de Octubre

- Primera División Paraguaya: 2002 Torneo Clasura

Libertad

- Primera División Paraguaya: 2003 Torneo Clasura, 2007 Torneo Clasura

Olimpia

- Copa Libertadores runner-up: 2013

Nacional

- Copa Libertadores runner-up: 2014

Paraguay U23

- Football at the Summer Olympics runner-up: 2004
- CONMEBOL Men Pre-Olympic Tournament runner-up: 2004

Paraguay

- LG Cup runner-up: 2002

Individual

- Fourth maximum goal scorer of Paraguayan football with 112 goals

== See also ==
- Players and Records in Paraguayan Football
