= Osvaldo Díaz =

Paraguayan footballer (born 1981)

Personal information
- Full name: Osvaldo Javier Díaz Gimenez
- Date of birth: 22 December 1981 (age 44)
- Place of birth: San Lorenzo, Paraguay
- Height: 1.74 m (5 ft 8 1/2 in)
- Position: Midfielder

Senior career*
Years	Team	Apps	(Gls)
2000–2007	Guaraní	167	(30)
2007	Olimpia	18	(2)
2008	AC Lugano	3	(0)
2008	12 de Octubre	5	(0)
2009–2010	Guaraní	6	(1)
2011–2012	Independiente FBC	41	(5)
2011	→ Sportivo Luqueño (loan)	18	(1)
2013	San Lorenzo		
2014–	12 de Octubre	12	(0)

International career
2001	Paraguay U20		
2004	Paraguay U23		
2004	Paraguay	1	(0)
- * Club domestic league appearances and goals

Olympic medal record

Men's Football
Silver medal – second place	2004 Athens	Team competition

Osvaldo Díaz (born 22 December 1981) is a retired Paraguayan footballer.

== Career ==
Díaz began his career at Club Guaraní before moving in mid 2007 to Olimpia Asunción in the Paraguayan First Division.

On 1 February 2008 he was signed by AC Lugano, where he only played a total of 17 minutes in 3 games.

On 4 August, before the Summer Olympics began, he played in a preparation game against the Portugal of Cristiano Ronaldo in the city of Algarve, resulting in a 5–0 defeat. Diaz was part of the silver medal-winning Paraguayan 2004 Olympic football team, which earned a quarter-final place with two victories in the qualifying round. Having finished second in the league, the squad later beat South Korea in the quarter-finals, and Iraq in the semi-finals, before losing to Argentina in the final.
