= Pablo Giménez =

Paraguayan footballer (born 1981)

Personal information
- Full name: Pablo Junior Giménez
- Date of birth: 29 June 1981 (age 45)
- Place of birth: Juan de Mena, Paraguay
- Position: Forward

Senior career*
Years	Team	Apps	(Gls)
2001–2004	Guarani	113	(35)
2005	Atlético Mineiro	7	(0)
2006	Cerro Porteño	17	(1)
2006	Quilmes	12	(2)
2007–2008	Cerro Porteño	43	(11)
2009	Querétaro	11	(4)
2009	Olimpia		
2010	Guaraní		
2011	Deportes Tolima	12	(0)
2011–2012	Sportivo Luqueño	20	(3)

International career
- Paraguay U23
Medal record
Olympic medal record
Representing Paraguay
Men's Football
Silver medal – second place	2004 Athens	Team competition
- * Club domestic league appearances and goals

Pablo Júnior Giménez (born 29 June 1981) is a Paraguayan former professional footballer who played as a forward.

He was part of the silver medal-winning Paraguayan football team at the 2004 Summer Olympics which lost to Argentina in the final.

== International career ==
On 4 August, before the Summer Olympics began, he played in a preparation game against the Portugal of Cristiano Ronaldo in the city of Algarve, resulting in a 5–0 defeat.
