= Emilio Martínez (footballer, born 1981) =

Paraguayan footballer

Personal information
- Full name: Emilio Agapito Damián Pelayo Martínez Martínez
- Date of birth: 30 July 1981 (age 45)
- Place of birth: Concepción, Paraguay
- Height: 1.78 m (5 ft 10 in)
- Position: Right back

Team information
- Current team: Club Sport Colombia
- Number: 13

Senior career*
Years	Team	Apps	(Gls)
1998–2000	Nacional Asunción	14	(0)
2001–2002	Cerro Porteño	24	(0)
2002–2004	Libertad	59	(1)
2005	Olimpia Asunción	11	(0)
2005–2006	UANL Tigres	31	(1)
2006–2007	Santos Laguna	7	(0)
2007	2 de Mayo	9	(0)
2008	Bolivar	26	(3)
2009–2010	Universidad Católica (Quito)	22	(0)
2011–	Club Sport Colombia	43	(1)

International career
2004	Paraguay U23		
2003–2004	Paraguay	5	(0)
Medal record
Men's Football
Representing Paraguay
Summer Olympics
Silver medal – second place	2004 Athens	Team
- * Club domestic league appearances and goals

Emilio Damián Martínez (born 10 April 1981 in Concepción) is a Paraguayan former professional footballer. He last played for Club Sport Colombia in Paraguay.

Martinez was part of Paraguay's silver medal-winning team at the 2004 Olympics. He was red-carded in the gold medal match.

== International career ==
On August 3, 2004, ahead of the Summer Olympics, he played in a preparation game against the Portugal U23 team, including Cristiano Ronaldo, in the city of Algarve, resulting in a 5–0 defeat.
