= Julio González (footballer, born 1981) =

Paraguayan footballer

Personal information
- Full name: Julio Valentín Ferreira González
- Date of birth: 26 August 1981 (age 45)
- Place of birth: Asunción, Paraguay
- Height: 1.91 m (6 ft 3 in)
- Position: Forward

Youth career
- Olimpia Asunción
- Guaraní

Senior career*
Years	Team	Apps	(Gls)
2001	Guaraní	29	(17)
2001–2007	Vicenza	38	(11)
2002	→ Huracán (loan)	10	(1)
2003–2004	→ Tacuary (loan)	15	(6)
2004	→ Nacional Asunción (loan)	12	(5)
2007	Tacuary	3	(0)
2008	Presidente Hayes		

International career
2004	Paraguay U23		
2001–2004	Paraguay	5	(1)
Medal record
Representing Paraguay
Men's Football
Silver medal – second place	2004 Athens	Team competition
- * Club domestic league appearances and goals

Julio Valentín Ferreira González (born 26 August 1981 in Asunción) is a retired Paraguayan footballer who played as a striker.

González played for Paraguay at the 2004 Olympics, helping the squad to a silver medal. He also competed with the team at the 2004 Copa América.

== Career ==
González, the top scorer for Serie B club Vicenza as of December 2005, was due to represent his country at the 2006 FIFA World Cup in Germany. However, on 22 December 2005, he was involved in a terrible car accident as he was going to Venice airport in order to take a flight over the holidays. After a long hospitalization, on 17 January 2006, González had his left arm amputated. The event was an important news item, and he immediately enjoyed the support of the whole sports world, including a visit from Alex Zanardi.

González then underwent a long period of rehabilitation, always considering a comeback to active football. The player, who was confirmed under contract with Vicenza for the 2006–07 season despite his inability was then awarded the Giacinto Facchetti Prize by Italian sports newspaper La Gazzetta dello Sport.

In July 2007, González returned to Paraguay and started training with club Tacuary, where his younger brother (Celso) plays. A few days later, he confirmed in an interview to La Gazzetta dello Sport he would also serve as local scout for his former team Vicenza.

González finally managed to make his comeback on 18 November 2007, playing for Tacuary in a Paraguayan First Division match against South American giants Olimpia Asunción. He played for 57 minutes. The news gained massive media exposure in Italy as well. In 2008, González went to play for Presidente Hayes.

Later that year in 2008, González took over Inter Campus, an Internazionale youth academy based in Paraguay.

== International career ==
On 4 August, before the Summer Olympics began, he played in a preparation game against the Portugal of Cristiano Ronaldo in the city of Algarve, resulting in a 5–0 defeat.
