= Diego Figueredo =

Paraguayan football player (born 1982)

Personal information
- Full name: Diego Antonio Figueredo Matiauda
- Date of birth: 28 April 1982 (age 44)
- Place of birth: Asunción, Paraguay
- Height: 1.85 m (6 ft 1 in)
- Position: Midfielder

Youth career
- Olimpia

Senior career*
Years	Team	Apps	(Gls)
2001–2003	Olimpia	12	(3)
2003–2007	Real Valladolid	36	(3)
2005–2006	→ Boavista (loan)	7	(1)
2006–2007	→ Godoy Cruz (loan)	8	(0)
2007–2008	Real Valladolid B	–	(–)
2008	Cerro Porteño	11	(1)
2009	Everton	4	(0)
2010	Olimpia	23	(2)
2011	Independiente FBC	18	(1)
2012	Guaraní	8	(1)
2012	Sportivo Luqueño	6	(0)
2014–2015	Rubio Ñu	36	(3)
Total		169	(15)

International career
2004	Paraguay U23		
2004	Paraguay	4	(0)
Medal record
Representing Paraguay
Men's Football
Silver medal – second place	2004 Athens	Team competition
- * Club domestic league appearances and goals

Olympic medal record

Men's Football
Silver medal – second place	2004 Athens	Team competition

Diego Antonio Figueredo Matiauda (born 28 April 1982 in Asunción) is a Paraguayan former football player who played as a midfielder.

== Career ==
He started his career in Olimpia Asunción of Paraguay before moving to Real Valladolid of Spain. He has also played for Godoy Cruz in Argentina, Boavista FC of Portugal and Cerro Porteño of the Liga Paraguaya.

Figueredo was part of the silver medal-winning Paraguayan 2004 Olympic football team, losing to Argentina in the final, a match in which he was sent off.
