= Carlos Jara Saguier =

Paraguayan footballer and coach (born 1956)

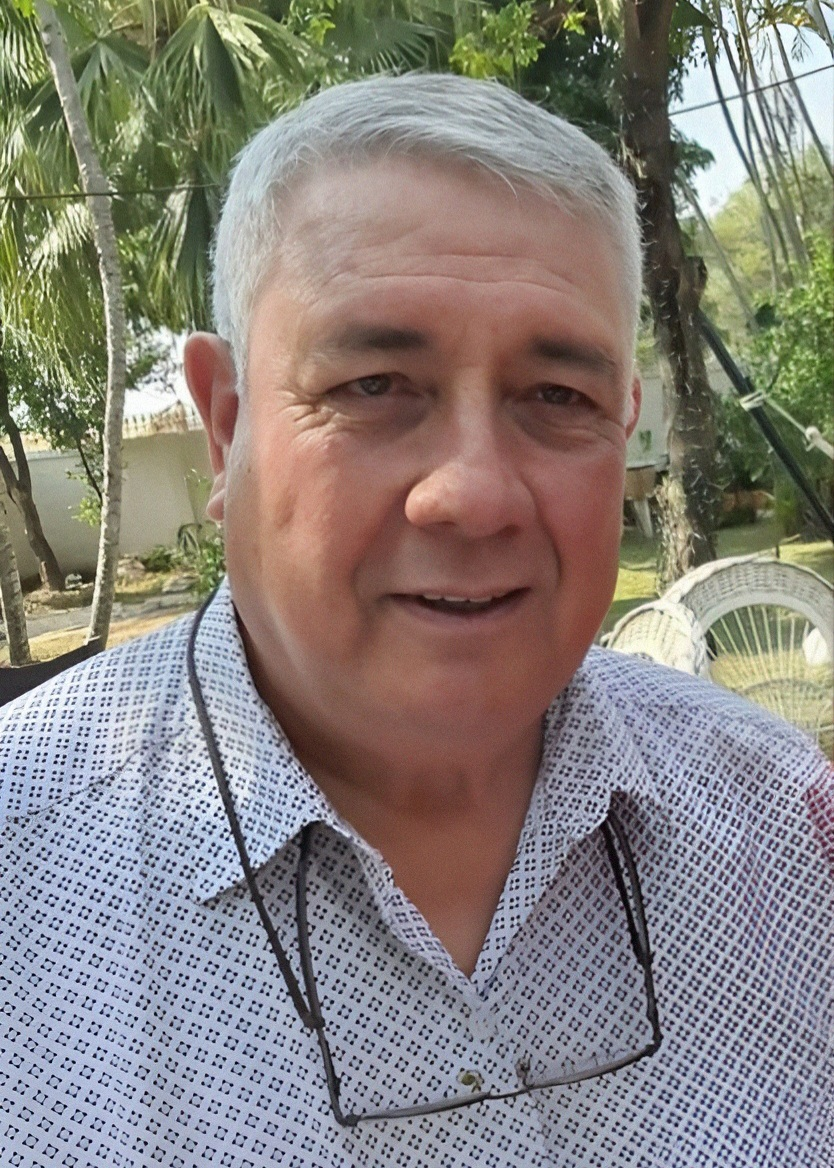
- Jara Saguier in 2022

Personal information
- Full name: Carlos de los Santos Jara Saguier
- Date of birth: 25 August 1950 (age 76)
- Place of birth: Asunción, Paraguay
- Position: Midfielder

Team information
- Current team: Cerro Porteño (staff)

Youth career
- Cerro Porteño

Senior career*
| Years | Team | Apps | (Gls) |
| 1968–1975 | Cerro Porteño | | |
| 1975–1983 | Cruz Azul | 256 | (45) |
| 1983 | Libertad | | |
| 1984–1985 | Cerro Porteño | | |
| 1986 | General Caballero ZC | | |
| 1987 | Sportivo Trinidense | | |

International career
| 1970–1981 | Paraguay | 24 | (2) |

Managerial career
- 1987–1988: Sportivo Trinidense
- 1989: Sportivo Iteño
- 1989–1990: Rubio Ñu
- 1991: Deportivo Humaitá
- 1991–1992: Sol de América
- 1993–1994: Cruz Azul Oaxaca
- 1997–1998: Cruz Azul Hidalgo
- 1999: Monterrey
- 2000: Paraguay U20
- 2002: Sportivo Luqueño
- 2003: Sport Colombia
- 2004: Paraguay U23
- 2004: Paraguay
- 2004: Libertad
- 2005: Querétaro
- 2005: 12 de Octubre
- 2006: Nacional
- 2007: Sol de América
- 2008–2010: Sol de América
- 2010–2012: Cruz Azul Oacaxa
- 2012: Independiente FBC
- 2013: Rubio Ñu
- 2014–2016: Paraguay U17
- 2017: Sportivo Trinidense
- 2018–2019: 2 de Mayo
- 2019: Deportivo Santaní
- 2019: 2 de Mayo
- 2023–2024: Paraguay U23
- 2024: Cerro Porteño
- * Club domestic league appearances and goals

Carlos de los Santos Jara Saguier (born 25 August 1950) is a Paraguayan former football player who works as a coach. He is a current member of Cerro Porteño's staff.

Carlos is one of the seven Jara Saguier brothers that played professional football in Paraguay.

== Career ==
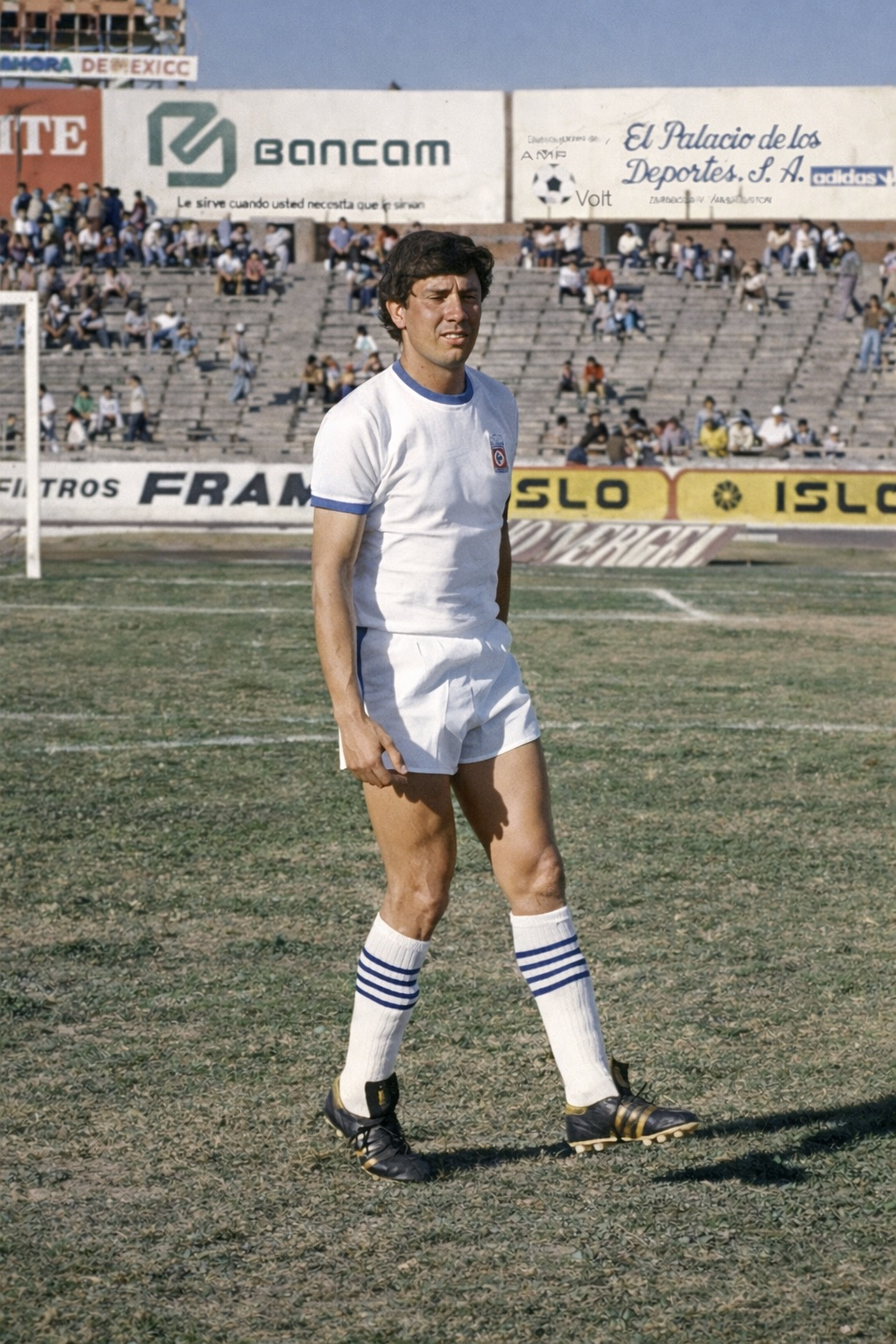
Jara Saguier playing for Cruz Azul in 1975

Born in Asunción, Jara Saguier played as a midfielder and spent the best years of his career at Cerro Porteño of Paraguay and Cruz Azul of Mexico. He played for the Paraguay national team from 1970 to 1981.

As a coach, Jara Saguier led the Paraguay national team to a historic silver medal in the 2004 Olympic Games, and in 2005 he led Querétaro F.C. of Mexico to his first Primera A championship.

Jara Saguier also coached clubs like Libertad, Nacional, Olimpia and Sportivo Luqueño of Paraguay and Monterrey FC and Cruz Azul Hidalgo of México.
