= 2004 Copa América knockout stage =

The 2004 Copa América knockout stage was the elimination stage of the Copa América, following the group stage. It began on 17 July 2004 and consisted of the quarter-finals, the semi-finals, the third-place play-off, and the final held at the National Stadium of Peru on 25 July, in Lima. No extra time was to be played if any match in the final stages finished tied after regulation; the match would go straight to a penalty shoot-out.

All times are in local, Peru Time (UTC−05:00).

== Qualified teams ==
The top two placed teams from each of the three groups, plus the two best-placed third teams, qualified for the knockout stage.

Group	Winners	Runners-up	Third-placed team (Best two qualify)
A	Colombia	Peru	—N/a
B	Mexico	Argentina	Uruguay
C	Paraguay	Brazil	Costa Rica

== Bracket ==
Quarter-finals
17 July – Chiclayo
Peru	0
Argentina	1
17 July – Trujillo
Colombia	2
Costa Rica	0
18 July – Piura
Mexico	0
Brazil	4
18 July – Tacna
Paraguay	1
Uruguay	3

Semi-finals
20 July – Lima
Argentina	3
Colombia	0
21 July – Lima
Brazil (p)	1 (5)
Uruguay	1 (3)

Final
25 July – Lima
Argentina	2 (2)
Brazil (p)	2 (4)
Third place
24 July – Cuzco
Colombia	1
Uruguay	2

== Quarter-finals ==
=== Peru v Argentina ===
17 July 2004
17:00

Peru	0–1	Argentina
	Report	Tevez 60'

Estadio Elías Aguirre, Chiclayo
Attendance: 25,000
Referee: Carlos Amarilla (Paraguay)

Peru	Argentina

GK	1	Óscar Ibáñez
RB	15	Guillermo Salas
CB	3	Miguel Rebosio
CB	2	Santiago Acasiete
LB	6	Walter Vílchez		(substituted off) 86'
DM	8	Juan Jayo	(yellow card) 28' (substituted off) 85'
DM	4	Jorge Soto
RW	7	Nolberto Solano	(yellow card) 89'
CM	10	Roberto Palacios
LW	20	Carlos Zegarra	(yellow card) 25' (substituted off) 66'
CF	16	Andrés Mendoza
Substitutions:
MF	18	Pedro García		(substituted on) 66'
MF	11	Aldo Olcese		(substituted on) 85'
DF	13	Juan La Rosa		(substituted on) 86'
Manager:
(Brazil) Paulo Autuori

GK	1	Roberto Abbondanzieri
CB	6	Gabriel Heinze
CB	2	Roberto Ayala	(yellow card) 26' (yellow-red card) 81'
CB	22	Fabricio Coloccini
RM	8	Javier Zanetti
LM	3	Juan Pablo Sorín
DM	16	Lucho González
AM	10	Andrés D'Alessandro		(substituted off) 57'
RW	19	César Delgado		(substituted off) 72'
LW	18	Kily González
CF	9	Luciano Figueroa		(substituted off) 83'
Substitutions:
FW	11	Carlos Tevez		(substituted on) 57'
FW	21	Mauro Rosales		(substituted on) 72'
DF	4	Facundo Quiroga		(substituted on) 83'
Manager:
Marcelo Bielsa

=== Colombia v Costa Rica ===
17 July 2004
19:45

Colombia	2–0	Costa Rica
Aguilar 41'; Moreno 45'	Report

Estadio Mansiche, Trujillo
Attendance: 18,000
Referee: Gustavo Méndez (Uruguay)

Colombia	Costa Rica

GK	1	Juan Carlos Henao
RB	21	Hayder Palacio
CB	2	Andrés González
CB	5	Andrés Orozco
LB	20	Gustavo Victoria
CM	6	Óscar Díaz
CM	18	Abel Aguilar
RW	17	Jairo Patiño	(substituted off) 83'
LW	11	Elkin Murillo	(substituted off) 87'
CF	7	Tressor Moreno
CF	9	Sergio Herrera	(substituted off) 72'
Substitutions:
MF	14	Edixon Perea	(substituted on) 72'
MF	15	Jhon Viáfara	(substituted on) 83'
MF	8	David Ferreira	(substituted on) 87'
Manager:
Reinaldo Rueda

GK	22	Ricardo González
RB	4	Alexander Castro
CB	3	Luis Marín
CB	19	Mauricio Wright
LB	12	Leonardo González
DM	14	Cristian Badilla
CM	20	Douglas Sequeira
RW	13	Carlos Hernández	(substituted off) 56'
LW	17	Steven Bryce	(substituted off) 46'
CF	7	Alonso Solís
CF	21	Andy Herron	(substituted off) 61'
Substitutions:
MF	10	Walter Centeno	(substituted on) 46'
FW	11	Rónald Gómez	(substituted on) 56'
FW	9	Álvaro Saborío	(substituted on) 61'
Manager:
(Colombia) Jorge Luis Pinto

=== Paraguay v Uruguay ===
18 July 2004
15:00

Paraguay	1–3	Uruguay
Gamarra 15'	Report	Bueno 40' (pen.); Silva 65', 88'

Estadio Jorge Basadre, Tacna
Attendance: 20,000
Referee: Héctor Baldassi (Argentina)

Paraguay	Uruguay

GK	1	Justo Villar
RB	15	Pedro Benítez
CB	3	Julio Manzur
CB	4	Carlos Gamarra
LB	18	Derlis González		(substituted off) 72'
CM	8	Édgar Barreto	(yellow card) 43'	(substituted off) 67'
CM	13	Carlos Paredes
RW	21	Aureliano Torres
LW	14	Ernesto Cristaldo	(yellow card) 35'	(substituted off) 60'
CF	19	Nelson Valdez
CF	9	Fredy Bareiro
Substitutions:
MF	10	Diego Figueredo		(substituted on) 60'
MF	20	Julio dos Santos		(substituted on) 67'
DF	16	David Villalba		(substituted on) 72'
Manager:
Carlos Jara Saguier

GK	1	Sebastián Viera
RB	7	Gustavo Varela	(yellow card) 53' (yellow-red card) 63'
CB	6	Alejandro Lago	(yellow card) 15'
CB	4	Paolo Montero
LB	3	Darío Rodríguez
CM	16	Javier Delgado	(yellow card) 24'
CM	5	Marcelo Sosa
RW	21	Diego Forlán		(substituted off) 68'
LW	11	Cristian Rodríguez		(substituted off) 85'
CF	20	Carlos Bueno		(substituted off) 74'
CF	9	Darío Silva	(yellow card) 29'
Substitutions:
FW	15	Diego Pérez		(substituted on) 68'
DF	14	Guillermo Rodríguez		(substituted on) 74'
FW	22	Vicente Sánchez		(substituted on) 85'
Manager:
Jorge Fossati

=== Mexico v Brazil ===
18 July 2004
20:00

Mexico	0–4	Brazil
	Report	Alex 26' (pen.); Adriano 65', 78'; Oliveira 87'

Estadio Miguel Grau, Piura
Attendance: 22,000
Referee: Óscar Ruiz (Colombia)

Mexico	Brazil

GK	1	Oswaldo Sánchez
RB	20	Ricardo Osorio		(substituted off) 33'
CB	18	Salvador Carmona
CB	4	Rafael Márquez	(yellow card) 85'
CB	5	Duilio Davino	(yellow card) 27'
LB	3	Omar Briceño
CM	8	Pável Pardo
CM	6	Gerardo Torrado		(substituted off) 60'
RM	21	Jesús Arellano		(substituted off) 80'
LM	7	Octavio Valdez
CF	10	Adolfo Bautista
Substitutions:
FW	9	Jared Borgetti		(substituted on) 60'
FW	11	Daniel Osorno		(substituted on) 80'
DF	22	Héctor Altamirano		(substituted on) 33'
Manager:
(Argentina) Ricardo La Volpe

GK	1	Júlio César
RB	13	Maicon
CB	4	Juan
CB	3	Luisão
LB	6	Gustavo Nery
RM	8	Kléberson	(yellow card) 28'
CM	5	Renato
LM	11	Edu	(yellow card) 79'
AM	10	Alex
CF	7	Adriano
CF	9	Luís Fabiano		(substituted off) 76'
Substitutions:
FW	21	Ricardo Oliveira		(substituted on) 76'
Manager:
Carlos Alberto Parreira

== Semi-finals ==
=== Argentina v Colombia ===
20 July 2004
19:45

Argentina	3–0	Colombia
Tevez 33'; L. González 50'; Sorín 80'	Report

Estadio Nacional, Lima
Attendance: 22,000
Referee: Gilberto Hidalgo (Peru)

Argentina	Colombia

GK	1	Roberto Abbondanzieri
RB	8	Javier Zanetti
CB	22	Fabricio Coloccini	(yellow card) 55'
CB	6	Gabriel Heinze
LB	3	Juan Pablo Sorín
CM	5	Javier Mascherano
CM	16	Lucho González
RW	19	César Delgado		(substituted off) 61'
CAM	11	Carlos Tevez
LW	18	Kily González	(yellow card) 70'	(substituted off) 85'
CF	9	Luciano Figueroa	(yellow card) 60'	(substituted off) 64'
Substitutions:
FW	21	Mauro Rosales		(substituted on) 61'
DF	4	Facundo Quiroga		(substituted on) 64'
DF	13	Diego Placente		(substituted on) 85'
Manager:
Marcelo Bielsa

GK	1	Juan Carlos Henao
RB	22	Gonzalo Martínez
CB	5	Andrés Orozco	(yellow card) 57'
CB	2	Andrés González
LB	20	Gustavo Victoria
DM	18	Abel Aguilar	(yellow card) 33'	(substituted off) 57'
RM	17	Jairo Patiño
LM	6	Óscar Díaz
AM	7	Tressor Moreno		(substituted off) 73'
CF	11	Elkin Murillo		(substituted off) 61'
CF	16	Edwin Congo
Substitutions:
MF	15	Jhon Viáfara		(substituted on) 57'
MF	14	Edixon Perea	(yellow card) 87'	(substituted on) 61'
MF	8	David Ferreira		(substituted on) 73'
Manager:
Reinaldo Rueda

=== Brazil v Uruguay ===
21 July 2004
19:45

Brazil	1–1	Uruguay
Adriano 46'	Report	Sosa 22'
Penalties
Luisão (penalty scored); Luís Fabiano (penalty scored); Adriano (penalty scored); Renato (penalty scored); Alex (penalty scored)	5–3	(penalty scored) Silva; (penalty scored) Viera; (penalty scored) Pouso; (penalty missed) Sánchez

Estadio Nacional, Lima
Attendance: 10,000
Referee: Marco Rodríguez (Mexico)

Brazil	Uruguay

GK	1	Júlio César
RB	13	Maicon
CB	3	Luisão
CB	4	Juan
LB	6	Gustavo Nery
RM	8	Kléberson		(substituted off) 75'
CM	5	Renato
LM	11	Edu		(substituted off) 75'
AM	10	Alex
CF	7	Adriano
CF	9	Luís Fabiano
Substitutions:
MF	18	Júlio Baptista	(yellow card) 79'	(substituted on) 75'
MF	19	Diego		(substituted on) 75'
Manager:
Carlos Alberto Parreira

GK	1	Sebastián Viera
RB	17	Carlos Diogo
CB	2	Joe Bizera
CB	4	Paolo Montero
LB	3	Darío Rodríguez
CM	5	Marcelo Sosa
CM	15	Diego Pérez		(substituted off) 80'
RW	16	Javier Delgado	(yellow card) 81'
LW	11	Cristian Rodríguez		(substituted off) 70'
CF	20	Carlos Bueno		(substituted off) 62'
CF	9	Darío Silva
Substitutions:
FW	21	Diego Forlán		(substituted on) 62'
FW	22	Vicente Sánchez		(substituted on) 70'
MF	8	Omar Pouso		(substituted on) 80'
Manager:
Jorge Fossati

== Third-place match ==
24 July 2004
19:45

Colombia	1–2	Uruguay
Herrera 70' (pen.)	Report	Estoyanoff 2'; Sánchez 80'

Estadio Garcilaso, Cuzco
Attendance: 35,000
Referee: René Ortubé (Bolivia)

Colombia	Uruguay

GK	1	Juan Carlos Henao
RB	22	Gonzalo Martínez
CB	5	Andrés Orozco	(yellow card) 40'
CB	2	Andrés González	(yellow card) 68'
LB	20	Gustavo Victoria
CM	18	Abel Aguilar
CM	17	Jairo Patiño		(substituted off) 68'
RW	15	Jhon Viáfara
AM	8	David Ferreira		(substituted off) 69'
LW	11	Elkin Murillo		(substituted off) 45'
CF	9	Sergio Herrera	(yellow card) 22'
Substitutions:
MF	10	Neider Morantes		(substituted on) 45'
DF	3	Jaime Castrillón		(substituted on) 68'
MF	14	Edixon Perea		(substituted on) 69'
Manager:
Reinaldo Rueda

GK	12	Luis Barbat
RB	17	Carlos Diogo	(yellow card) 62'
CB	2	Joe Bizera
CB	6	Alejandro Lago
LB	14	Guillermo Rodríguez
CM	19	Jorge Martínez		(substituted off) 68'
CM	8	Omar Pouso
RW	22	Vicente Sánchez
LW	10	Juan Martín Parodi		(substituted off) 76'
CF	13	Fabián Estoyanoff	(yellow card) 4'	(substituted off) 58'
CF	18	Richard Morales
Substitutions:
MF	5	Marcelo Sosa	(yellow card) 82'	(substituted on) 58'
MF	7	Gustavo Varela		(substituted on) 68'
FW	21	Diego Forlán		(substituted on) 76'
Manager:
Jorge Fossati

== Final ==
25 July 2004
15:00

Argentina	2–2	Brazil
K. González 21' (pen.); Delgado 87'	Report	Luisão 45+1'; Adriano 90+3'
Penalties
D'Alessandro (penalty missed); Heinze (penalty missed); K. González (penalty scored); Sorín (penalty scored)	2–4	(penalty scored) Adriano; (penalty scored) Edu; (penalty scored) Diego; (penalty scored) Juan

Estadio Nacional, Lima
Attendance: 43,000
Referee: Carlos Amarilla (Paraguay)

Argentina	Brazil

GK	1	Roberto Abbondanzieri
CB	22	Fabricio Coloccini
CB	2	Roberto Ayala (c)
CB	6	Gabriel Heinze
RWB	8	Javier Zanetti
LWB	3	Juan Pablo Sorín	(yellow card) 25'
DM	5	Javier Mascherano	(yellow card) 72'
RM	21	Mauro Rosales		(substituted off) 64'
CM	16	Lucho González		(substituted off) 75'
LM	18	Kily González
CF	11	Carlos Tevez		(substituted off) 90'
Substitutions:
FW	19	César Delgado		(substituted on) 64'
MF	10	Andrés D'Alessandro		(substituted on) 75'
DF	4	Facundo Quiroga		(substituted on) 90'
Manager:
Marcelo Bielsa

GK	1	Júlio César	(yellow card) 51'
RB	13	Maicon
CB	3	Luisão	(yellow card) 58'	(substituted off) 82'
CB	4	Juan
LB	6	Gustavo Nery
CM	8	Kléberson		(substituted off) 55'
CM	5	Renato
CM	11	Edu	(yellow card) 38'
AM	10	Alex (c)		(substituted off) 63'
CF	9	Luís Fabiano
CF	7	Adriano
Substitutions:
MF	19	Diego		(substituted on) 55'
MF	20	Felipe		(substituted on) 63'
DF	15	Cris		(substituted on) 82'
Manager:
Carlos Alberto Parreira
