= 2004 Copa América Group C =

Group C of the 2004 Copa América was one of the three groups of competing nations in the 2004 Copa América. It comprised Brazil, Chile, Costa Rica, and Paraguay. Group play ran from 8 to 14 July 2004.

Paraguay won the group and faced Uruguay—the best-ranked third-placed team—in the quarter-finals. Brazil finished second and faced Mexico—the winners of Group B—in the quarter-finals. Costa Rica finished third and faced Colombia, the winners of Group A, in the quarter-finals. Chile finished fourth in the group, and were eliminated from the tournament.

== Standings ==
Team	Pld	W	D	L	GF	GA	GD	Pts
Paraguay	3	2	1	0	4	2	+2	7
Brazil	3	2	0	1	6	3	+3	6
Costa Rica	3	1	0	2	3	6	−3	3
Chile	3	0	1	2	2	4	−2	1

Teams that advanced to the quarter-finals
- Group winners
- Group runners-up
- Best two third-placed teams among all groups

All times are in local, Peru Time (UTC−05:00).

== Matches ==
=== Costa Rica vs Paraguay ===
8 July 2004
17:30

Costa Rica	0–1	Paraguay
	Report	Dos Santos 85' (pen.)

Estadio Arequipa, Arequipa
Attendance: 30,000
Referee: Óscar Ruiz (Colombia)

Costa Rica	Paraguay

GK	22	Ricardo González
RB	16	Try Bennett
CB	3	Luis Marín
CB	19	Mauricio Wright	(yellow card) 30'
LB	12	Leonardo González
DM	14	Cristian Badilla
CM	20	Douglas Sequeira
RW	10	Walter Centeno		(substituted off) 79'
LW	17	Steven Bryce
CF	11	Rónald Gómez		(substituted off) 60'
CF	21	Andy Herron		(substituted off) 60'
Substitutions:
MF	7	Alonso Solís		(substituted on) 60'
FW	9	Álvaro Saborío		(substituted on) 60'
MF	13	Carlos Hernández		(substituted on) 79'
Manager:
(Colombia) Jorge Luis Pinto

GK	12	Diego Barreto
CB	2	Emilio Martínez
CB	5	José Devaca		(substituted off) 62'
CB	4	Carlos Gamarra
RBW	14	Ernesto Cristaldo
LBW	21	Aureliano Torres
CM	8	Édgar Barreto
CM	13	Carlos Paredes	(yellow card) 42'
AM	6	Jorge Brítez		(substituted off) 46'
CF	10	Diego Figueredo		(substituted off) 62'
CF	19	Nelson Valdez
Substitutions:
MF	20	Julio dos Santos		(substituted on) 46'
FW	9	Fredy Bareiro		(substituted on) 62'
DF	15	Pedro Benítez		(substituted on) 62'
Manager:
Carlos Jara Saguier

=== Brazil vs Chile ===
8 July 2004
19:45

Brazil	1–0	Chile
Luís Fabiano 90'	Report

Estadio Arequipa, Arequipa
Attendance: 35,000
Referee: Marco Antonio Rodríguez (Mexico)

Brazil	Chile

GK	1	Júlio César	(yellow card) 49'
RB	2	Mancini	(yellow card) 65'	(substituted off) 80'
CB	4	Juan	(yellow card) 22'
CB	3	Luisão
LB	6	Gustavo Nery
RM	16	Dudu Cearense		(substituted off) 63'
CM	5	Renato
LM	11	Edu	(yellow card) 89'
AM	10	Alex
CF	7	Adriano		(substituted off) 63'
CF	9	Luís Fabiano
Substitutions:
DF	13	Maicon		(substituted on) 80'
MF	19	Diego	(yellow card) 86'	(substituted on) 63'
FW	21	Ricardo Oliveira		(substituted on) 63'
Manager:
Carlos Alberto Parreira

GK	12	Alex Varas
CB	19	Rafael Olarra
CB	14	Moisés Villarroel	(yellow card) 17'
CB	3	Luis Fuentes	(yellow card) 65'
CM	6	Clarence Acuña
CM	18	Rodrigo Meléndez	(yellow card) 82'
RW	7	Rodrigo Valenzuela
LW	4	Rodrigo Pérez
RM	16	Jonathan Cisternas	(yellow card) 38'	(substituted off) 46'
LM	17	Milovan Mirošević		(substituted off) 85'
CF	9	Sebastián González		(substituted off) 66'
Substitutions:
MF	10	Luis Jiménez		(substituted on) 46'
FW	15	Héctor Mancilla		(substituted on) 66'
FW	22	Patricio Galaz		(substituted on) 85'
Manager:
Juvenal Olmos

=== Brazil vs Costa Rica ===
11 July 2004
15:00

Brazil	4–1	Costa Rica
Adriano 45', 54', 67'; Juan 49'	Report	Marín 81'

Estadio Arequipa, Arequipa
Attendance: 12,000
Referee: Héctor Baldassi (Argentina)

Brazil	Costa Rica

GK	1	Júlio César
RB	2	Mancini
CB	4	Juan
CB	3	Luisão
LB	6	Gustavo Nery
RM	8	Kléberson		(substituted off) 58'
CM	5	Renato
LM	11	Edu		(substituted off) 66'
AM	10	Alex
CF	7	Adriano
CF	9	Luís Fabiano		(substituted off) 58'
Substitutions:
MF	19	Diego		(substituted on) 58'
FW	22	Vágner Love		(substituted on) 58'
MF	16	Dudu Cearense	(yellow card) 73'	(substituted on) 66'
Manager:
Carlos Alberto Parreira

GK	22	Ricardo González
RB	16	Try Bennett
CB	3	Luis Marín
CB	19	Mauricio Wright
LB	12	Leonardo González
DM	14	Cristian Badilla	(substituted off) 59'
CM	20	Douglas Sequeira
RW	10	Walter Centeno
LW	17	Steven Bryce
CF	7	Alonso Solís	(substituted off) 76'
CF	9	Álvaro Saborío	(substituted off) 72'
Substitutions:
FW	11	Rónald Gómez	(substituted on) 59'
FW	21	Andy Herron	(substituted on) 72'
MF	13	Carlos Hernández	(substituted on) 76'
Manager:
(Colombia) Jorge Luis Pinto

=== Paraguay vs Chile ===
11 July 2004
17:15

Paraguay	1–1	Chile
Cristaldo 78'	Report	González 71'

Estadio Arequipa, Arequipa
Attendance: 15,000
Referee: Gustavo Méndez (Uruguay)

Paraguay	Chile

GK	1	Justo Villar
RB	18	Derlis González
CB	4	Carlos Gamarra
CB	15	Pedro Benítez
LB	14	Ernesto Cristaldo
DM	13	Carlos Paredes
RW	8	Édgar Barreto
LW	21	Aureliano Torres
AM	10	Diego Figueredo		(substituted off) 67'
CF	9	Fredy Bareiro		(substituted off) 80'
CF	19	Nelson Valdez	(yellow card) 63'	(substituted off) 65'
Substitutions:
MF	20	Julio dos Santos		(substituted on) 65'
FW	7	Dante López		(substituted on) 67'
DF	2	Emilio Martínez		(substituted on) 80'
Manager:
Carlos Jara Saguier

GK	1	Claudio Bravo
RB	13	Ismael Fuentes	(yellow card) 57'
CB	19	Rafael Olarra
CB	3	Luis Fuentes
LB	4	Rodrigo Pérez		(substituted off) 46'
CM	6	Clarence Acuña		(substituted off) 63'
CM	18	Rodrigo Meléndez
RW	17	Milovan Mirošević
LW	7	Rodrigo Valenzuela
CF	22	Patricio Galaz		(substituted off) 46'
CF	9	Sebastián González
Substitutions:
FW	15	Héctor Mancilla		(substituted on) 46'
MF	20	Mauricio Aros		(substituted on) 46'
MF	8	Rodrigo Millar		(substituted on) 63'
Manager:
Juvenal Olmos

=== Costa Rica vs Chile ===
14 July 2004
17:30

Costa Rica	2–1	Chile
Wright 60'; Herron 90'	Report	Olarra 40'

Estadio Jorge Basadre, Tacna
Attendance: 20,000
Referee: René Ortubé (Bolivia)

Costa Rica	Chile

GK	22	Ricardo González
RB	4	Alexander Castro
CB	19	Mauricio Wright
CB	3	Luis Marín
LB	12	Leonardo González	(yellow card) 38'	(substituted off) 46'
RW	17	Steven Bryce		(substituted off) 75'
CM	20	Douglas Sequeira
LW	14	Cristian Badilla	(yellow card) 36'	(substituted off) 46'
RM	7	Alonso Solís	(yellow card) 21'
LM	10	Walter Centeno
CF	21	Andy Herron
Substitutions:
FW	5	Whayne Wilson		(substituted on) 46'
DF	15	Júnior Díaz	(yellow card) 80'	(substituted on) 46'
FW	9	Álvaro Saborío		(substituted on) 75'
Manager:
(Colombia) Jorge Luis Pinto

GK	12	Alex Varas
RB	13	Ismael Fuentes
CB	19	Rafael Olarra
CB	3	Luis Fuentes
LB	4	Rodrigo Pérez		(substituted off) 71'
CM	6	Clarence Acuña		(substituted off) 46'
CM	8	Rodrigo Millar		(substituted off) 71'
RW	10	Luis Jiménez	(yellow card) 86'
LW	7	Rodrigo Valenzuela
CF	9	Sebastián González
CF	15	Héctor Mancilla	(yellow card) 45'
Substitutions:
MF	18	Rodrigo Meléndez	(yellow card) 89'	(substituted on) 46'
MF	17	Milovan Mirošević		(substituted on) 71'
MF	20	Mauricio Aros		(substituted on) 71'
Manager:
Juvenal Olmos

=== Brazil vs Paraguay ===
14 July 2004
19:45

Brazil	1–2	Paraguay
Luís Fabiano 35'	Report	González 29'; Bareiro 71'

Estadio Arequipa, Arequipa
Attendance: 8,000
Referee: Gilberto Hidalgo (Peru)

Brazil	Paraguay

GK	1	Júlio César
RB	13	Maicon
CB	3	Luisão	(yellow card) 16'
CB	15	Cris
LB	6	Gustavo Nery
RM	8	Kléberson		(substituted off) 75'
CM	5	Renato
LM	11	Edu		(substituted off) 65'
AM	20	Felipe		(substituted off) 65'
CF	7	Adriano
CF	9	Luís Fabiano
Substitutions:
MF	16	Dudu Cearense		(substituted on) 65'
MF	19	Diego		(substituted on) 65'
FW	21	Ricardo Oliveira		(substituted on) 75'
Manager:
Carlos Alberto Parreira

GK	12	Diego Barreto
RB	2	Emilio Martínez	(red card) 73'
CB	3	Julio Manzur
CB	4	Carlos Gamarra
LB	15	Pedro Benítez
CM	13	Carlos Paredes
CM	8	Édgar Barreto
RW	20	Julio dos Santos		(substituted off) 68'
LW	17	Celso Esquivel
CF	9	Fredy Bareiro	(yellow card) 39'	(substituted off) 75'
CF	11	Julio González	(yellow card) 62'	(substituted off) 63'
Substitutions:
MF	10	Diego Figueredo		(substituted on) 63'
FW	22	Fabio Escobar		(substituted on) 68'
DF	18	Derlis González		(substituted on) 75'
Manager:
Carlos Jara Saguier
