= 2003 CONCACAF Gold Cup squads =

These are the squads for the 2003 CONCACAF Gold Cup.

== Group A ==
=== Brazil ===
Head coach: (Brazil) Ricardo Gomes

No.	Pos.	Player	Date of birth (age)	Club
1	GK	Heurelho Gomes	15 February 1981 (aged 22)	(Brazilian Football Confederation) Cruzeiro
2	DF	Maicon	26 July 1981 (aged 21)	(Brazilian Football Confederation) Cruzeiro
3	DF	Luisão	13 February 1981 (aged 22)	(Brazilian Football Confederation) Cruzeiro
4	DF	Alex	17 June 1982 (aged 21)	(Brazilian Football Confederation) Santos
5	DF	Adriano	26 October 1984 (aged 18)	(Brazilian Football Confederation) Coritiba
6	MF	Paulo Almeida	20 April 1981 (aged 22)	(Brazilian Football Confederation) Santos
7	MF	Júlio Baptista	1 October 1981 (aged 21)	(Brazilian Football Confederation) São Paulo
8	MF	Kaká	22 April 1982 (aged 21)	(Brazilian Football Confederation) São Paulo
9	FW	Ewerthon	10 June 1981 (aged 22)	(German Football Association) Borussia Dortmund
10	MF	Diego	28 February 1985 (aged 18)	(Brazilian Football Confederation) Santos
11	FW	Robinho	25 January 1984 (aged 19)	(Brazilian Football Confederation) Santos
12	GK	Alexandre Negri	27 March 1981 (aged 22)	(Brazilian Football Confederation) Ponte Preta
13	DF	Dyego Coelho	22 March 1983 (aged 20)	(Brazilian Football Confederation) Corinthians
14	DF	André Bahia	24 November 1983 (aged 19)	(Brazilian Football Confederation) Flamengo
15	FW	Nilmar	14 July 1984 (aged 18)	(Brazilian Football Confederation) Internacional
16	FW	Nádson	30 January 1982 (aged 21)	(Brazilian Football Confederation) Vitória
17	MF	Carlos Alberto	11 December 1984 (aged 18)	(Brazilian Football Confederation) Fluminense
18	MF	Thiago Motta	28 August 1982 (aged 20)	(Royal Spanish Football Federation) Barcelona

=== Honduras ===
Head coach: (Honduras) Edwin Pavón

No.	Pos.	Player	Date of birth (age)	Club
3	DF	Ninrod Medina	26 August 1976 (aged 26)	(Mexican Football Federation) Zacatepec
4	DF	Milton Palacios	2 December 1980 (aged 22)	(National Autonomous Federation of Football of Honduras) Olimpia
5	DF	Érick Vallecillo	29 January 1980 (aged 23)	(National Autonomous Federation of Football of Honduras) Real España
6	DF	Jaime Rosales	2 June 1978 (aged 25)	(National Autonomous Federation of Football of Honduras) Real España
7	FW	David Suazo	5 November 1979 (aged 23)	(Italian Football Federation) Cagliari
9	FW	Jairo Martínez	14 May 1978 (aged 25)	(National Autonomous Federation of Football of Honduras) Motagua
10	MF	Julio César de León	13 September 1979 (aged 23)	(Italian Football Federation) Reggina
11	FW	Wilmer Velásquez	28 April 1972 (aged 31)	(National Autonomous Federation of Football of Honduras) Olimpia
13	FW	Emil Martínez	17 September 1982 (aged 20)	(National Autonomous Federation of Football of Honduras) Marathón
14	DF	Rony Morales	8 June 1978 (aged 25)	(National Autonomous Federation of Football of Honduras) Platense
16	MF	Danilo Turcios	8 May 1978 (aged 25)	(Mexican Football Federation) Tecos UAG
17	DF	Javier Omar Martínez	6 December 1971 (aged 31)	(National Autonomous Federation of Football of Honduras) Marathón
19	DF	Edgar Álvarez	9 January 1980 (aged 23)	(National Autonomous Federation of Football of Honduras) Platense
21	FW	Walter Hernández	28 November 1978 (aged 24)	(National Autonomous Federation of Football of Honduras) Platense
22	GK	John Alston Bodden	3 October 1981 (aged 21)	(National Autonomous Federation of Football of Honduras) Victoria
23	MF	Óscar Bonilla	11 June 1978 (aged 25)	(National Autonomous Federation of Football of Honduras) Olimpia
24	MF	Luis Guifarro	25 August 1976 (aged 26)	(National Autonomous Federation of Football of Honduras) Marathón
25	GK	Víctor Coello	29 July 1974 (aged 28)	(National Autonomous Federation of Football of Honduras) Marathón

=== Mexico ===
Head coach: (Argentina) Ricardo La Volpe

No.	Pos.	Player	Date of birth (age)	Club
1	GK	Oswaldo Sánchez	21 September 1973 (aged 29)	(Mexican Football Federation) Guadalajara
2	DF	Fernando Salazar	13 July 1979 (aged 23)	(Mexican Football Federation) Atlas
3	DF	Omar Briceño	30 January 1978 (aged 25)	(Mexican Football Federation) Tigres UANL
4	DF	Rafael Márquez	13 February 1979 (aged 24)	(Royal Spanish Football Federation) Barcelona
5	DF	Ricardo Osorio	30 March 1981 (aged 22)	(Mexican Football Federation) Cruz Azul
6	MF	Octavio Valdez	7 December 1973 (aged 29)	(Mexican Football Federation) Pachuca
7	FW	Omar Bravo	4 March 1980 (aged 23)	(Mexican Football Federation) Guadalajara
8	MF	Pável Pardo	26 July 1976 (aged 26)	(Mexican Football Federation) América
9	FW	Jared Borgetti	14 August 1973 (aged 29)	(Mexican Football Federation) Santos Laguna
10	FW	Miguel Zepeda	25 May 1976 (aged 27)	(Mexican Football Federation) Cruz Azul
11	MF	Daniel Osorno	16 March 1979 (aged 24)	(Mexican Football Federation) Atlas
12	GK	Óscar Pérez	1 February 1973 (aged 30)	(Mexican Football Federation) Cruz Azul
14	MF	Luis Ernesto Pérez	12 January 1981 (aged 22)	(Mexican Football Federation) Monterrey
15	MF	Juan Pablo Rodríguez	7 August 1979 (aged 23)	(Mexican Football Federation) Atlas
16	MF	Mario Méndez	1 June 1979 (aged 24)	(Mexican Football Federation) Atlas
18	DF	Salvador Carmona	22 August 1975 (aged 27)	(Mexican Football Federation) Toluca
20	MF	Rafael García	14 August 1974 (aged 28)	(Mexican Football Federation) Toluca
21	FW	Jesús Arellano	8 March 1973 (aged 30)	(Mexican Football Federation) Monterrey

== Group B ==
=== Colombia ===
Head coach: (Colombia) Francisco Maturana

No.	Pos.	Player	Date of birth (age)	Club
1	GK	Faryd Mondragón	21 June 1971 (aged 32)	(Turkish Football Federation) Galatasaray
2	DF	Kilian Virviescas	2 August 1980 (aged 22)	(Colombian Football Federation) América de Cali
3	DF	Andrés Orozco	18 March 1979 (aged 24)	(Argentine Football Association) Racing Club
4	DF	Gerardo Vallejo	3 December 1976 (aged 26)	(Colombian Football Federation) Deportivo Cali
5	DF	José Mera	11 March 1979 (aged 24)	(Colombian Football Federation) Deportivo Cali
6	DF	Luis Perea	30 January 1979 (aged 24)	(Colombian Football Federation) Independiente Medellín
7	MF	Jairo Patiño	5 April 1978 (aged 25)	(Colombian Football Federation) Deportivo Cali
8	MF	Harold Lozano	30 March 1972 (aged 31)	(Royal Spanish Football Federation) Mallorca
9	FW	Julián Vásquez	5 September 1972 (aged 30)	(Colombian Football Federation) América de Cali
10	MF	Giovanni Hernández	16 June 1976 (aged 27)	(Colombian Football Federation) Deportivo Cali
11	FW	Elkin Murillo	20 September 1977 (aged 25)	(Colombian Football Federation) Deportivo Cali
12	GK	Juan Carlos Henao	30 December 1971 (aged 31)	(Colombian Football Federation) Once Caldas
13	MF	David Montoya	14 February 1978 (aged 25)	(Colombian Football Federation) Independiente Medellín
14	MF	Mauricio Molina	30 April 1980 (aged 23)	(Colombian Football Federation) Independiente Medellín
15	MF	Rubén Darío Velázquez	18 December 1975 (aged 27)	(Colombian Football Federation) Once Caldas
16	DF	Rubén Bustos	28 August 1981 (aged 21)	(Colombian Football Federation) América de Cali
17	MF	John Restrepo	22 August 1977 (aged 25)	(Colombian Football Federation) Independiente Medellín
18	FW	John Jairo Castillo	17 November 1977 (aged 25)	(Colombian Football Federation) América de Cali

=== Guatemala ===
Head coach: (Guatemala) Víctor Manuel Aguado

No.	Pos.	Player	Date of birth (age)	Club
1	GK	Edgar Estrada	16 November 1967 (aged 35)	(National Football Federation of Guatemala) Comunicaciones
2	DF	Nelson Morales	20 September 1976 (aged 26)	(National Football Federation of Guatemala) Cobán Imperial
3	DF	Rolando Cedeño	4 June 1971 (aged 32)	(Mexican Football Federation) Jaguares de Chiapas
4	DF	Mynor González	16 August 1982 (aged 20)	(United States Soccer Federation) SMU Mustangs
6	DF	Julio César Monterroso	22 June 1981 (aged 22)	(National Football Federation of Guatemala) Juventud Retalteca
7	MF	Fredy Thompson	2 June 1982 (aged 21)	(National Football Federation of Guatemala) Comunicaciones
8	FW	Mario Rafael Rodríguez	14 September 1981 (aged 21)	(National Football Federation of Guatemala) Comunicaciones
9	FW	Mario Acevedo	15 February 1969 (aged 34)	(National Football Federation of Guatemala) Municipal
10	MF	Freddy García	12 January 1977 (aged 26)	(United States Soccer Federation) Columbus Crew
13	DF	Néstor Martínez	13 March 1981 (aged 22)	(National Football Federation of Guatemala) Comunicaciones
14	MF	Héctor Aguirre	15 February 1976 (aged 27)	(National Football Federation of Guatemala) Aurora
15	FW	Juan Carlos Plata	1 January 1971 (aged 32)	(National Football Federation of Guatemala) Municipal
16	MF	Martín Machón	4 February 1973 (aged 30)	(National Football Federation of Guatemala) Comunicaciones
18	MF	Gonzalo Romero	25 March 1975 (aged 28)	(National Football Federation of Guatemala) Municipal
19	DF	Édgar Valencia	31 March 1971 (aged 32)	(National Football Federation of Guatemala) Comunicaciones
20	FW	Carlos Ruíz	15 September 1979 (aged 23)	(United States Soccer Federation) Los Angeles Galaxy
21	MF	Zacarías Antonio	15 March 1982 (aged 21)	(National Football Federation of Guatemala) Juventud Retalteca
22	GK	Paulo César Motta	29 March 1982 (aged 21)	(National Football Federation of Guatemala) Juventud Retalteca

=== Jamaica ===
Head coach: (Jamaica) Carl Brown

No.	Pos.	Player	Date of birth (age)	Club
3	DF	Damion Stewart	18 August 1980 (aged 22)	(Jamaica Football Federation) Harbour View
6	DF	Michael Johnson	4 July 1973 (aged 30)	(The Football Association) Birmingham City
8	MF	Jamie Lawrence	8 March 1970 (aged 33)	(The Football Association) Walsall
9	MF	Andrew Williams	23 September 1977 (aged 25)	(United States Soccer Federation) Chicago Fire
10	FW	Darren Byfield	29 September 1976 (aged 26)	(The Football Association) Rotherham United
11	MF	Theodore Whitmore	5 August 1972 (aged 30)	(Jamaica Football Federation) Seba United
13	GK	Aaron Lawrence	11 August 1970 (aged 32)	(Jamaica Football Federation) Reno
14	DF	Tyrone Marshall	12 November 1974 (aged 28)	(United States Soccer Federation) LA Galaxy
15	MF	Ricardo Gardner	25 September 1978 (aged 24)	(The Football Association) Bolton Wanderers
16	DF	Gerald Neil	22 August 1978 (aged 24)	(Jamaica Football Federation) Arnett Gardens
17	DF	Marco McDonald	31 August 1977 (aged 25)	(Jamaica Football Federation) Tivoli Gardens
18	MF	Richard Langley	27 December 1979 (aged 23)	(The Football Association) Queens Park Rangers
19	FW	Fabian Taylor	13 April 1980 (aged 23)	(Jamaica Football Federation) Harbour View
20	DF	Omar Daley	25 April 1981 (aged 22)	(Jamaica Football Federation) Hazard United
22	DF	Craig Ziadie	20 September 1978 (aged 24)	(United States Soccer Federation) MetroStars
25	DF	Claude Davis	6 March 1979 (aged 24)	(Jamaica Football Federation) Hazard United
30	GK	Donovan Ricketts	7 June 1977 (aged 26)	(Jamaica Football Federation) Village United
31	FW	Onandi Lowe	2 December 1974 (aged 28)	(The Football Association) Rushden & Diamonds

== Group C ==
=== El Salvador ===
Head coach: (El Salvador) Juan Ramón Paredes

No.	Pos.	Player	Date of birth (age)	Club
1	GK	Henry Hernández	4 January 1985 (aged 18)	(Salvadoran Football Federation) Águila
2	DF	William Torres	30 May 1981 (aged 22)	(Salvadoran Football Federation) San Salvador
3	DF	Marvin González	17 April 1982 (aged 21)	(Salvadoran Football Federation) FAS
4	DF	Julio Castro	15 January 1981 (aged 22)	(Salvadoran Football Federation) Arcense
5	DF	Víctor Velásquez	12 April 1976 (aged 27)	(Salvadoran Football Federation) FAS
6	MF	Óscar Navarro	13 January 1979 (aged 24)	(Salvadoran Football Federation) Alianza
7	MF	Ramón Sánchez	25 May 1982 (aged 21)	(Salvadoran Football Federation) Arcense
8	MF	Santos Cabrera	1 November 1976 (aged 26)	(Salvadoran Football Federation) Luis Ángel Firpo
9	FW	Diego Mejía	20 June 1982 (aged 21)	(Salvadoran Football Federation) Alianza
11	DF	William Torres Alegria	27 October 1976 (aged 26)	(Salvadoran Football Federation) Águila
12	FW	Alexander Campos	8 May 1980 (aged 23)	(Salvadoran Football Federation) Águila
14	FW	Rudis Corrales	6 November 1979 (aged 23)	(Salvadoran Football Federation) Municipal Limeño
15	MF	Roberto Ochoa	10 March 1983 (aged 20)	(Salvadoran Football Federation) Atlético Balboa
17	MF	Carlos Menjívar	13 April 1981 (aged 22)	(Salvadoran Football Federation) FAS
18	MF	Gilberto Murgas	22 January 1981 (aged 22)	(Salvadoran Football Federation) FAS
19	DF	Alfredo Pacheco	1 December 1982 (aged 20)	(Salvadoran Football Federation) FAS
21	DF	Mauricio Quintanilla	31 October 1981 (aged 21)	(Salvadoran Football Federation) Luis Ángel Firpo
22	GK	Juan José Gómez	11 August 1980 (aged 22)	(Salvadoran Football Federation) Águila
24	MF	Guillermo Morán	12 February 1979 (aged 24)	(Salvadoran Football Federation) Luis Ángel Firpo

=== Martinique ===
Head coach: (Martinique) Théodore Antonin

No.	Pos.	Player	Date of birth (age)	Club
1	GK	Jean-François Go	9 August 1973 (aged 29)	(Ligue de football de la Martinique) Case-Pilote
2	DF	Laurent Lagrand	24 November 1974 (aged 28)	(Ligue de football de la Martinique) Club Franciscain
4	DF	Jude Vaton	17 April 1972 (aged 31)	(Ligue de football de la Martinique) Samaritaine
5	FW	Patrick Percin	18 December 1976 (aged 26)	(Ligue de football de la Martinique) Club Franciscain
6	MF	Gaël Germany	10 May 1983 (aged 20)	(Ligue de football de la Martinique) Samaritaine
7	FW	Yann Girier-Dufournier	26 August 1980 (aged 22)	(Ligue de football de la Martinique) Rivière-Pilote
8	DF	David Dicanot	23 September 1973 (aged 29)	(Ligue de football de la Martinique) Club Franciscain
10	FW	José Goron	1 April 1977 (aged 26)	(Ligue de football de la Martinique) Case-Pilote
11	FW	Miguel Duragrin	15 January 1975 (aged 28)	(Ligue de football de la Martinique) Étendard
12	DF	Stéphane Suedile	14 April 1983 (aged 20)	(Ligue de football de la Martinique) Golden Star
14	MF	Jean-Michel Michaud	19 April 1975 (aged 28)	(Ligue de football de la Martinique) Samaritaine
15	DF	Willy Padoly	20 December 1978 (aged 24)	(Ligue de football de la Martinique) Aiglon du Lamentin
16	MF	Jean Victor Lavril	24 August 1969 (aged 33)	(Ligue de football de la Martinique) Case-Pilote
17	DF	William Anin	2 November 1980 (aged 22)	(Ligue de football de la Martinique) Club Franciscain
18	MF	Roberto Cinna		(Ligue de football de la Martinique) Stade Spiritain
20	FW	Dominique Reyal	29 September 1982 (aged 20)	(Ligue de football de la Martinique) Club Franciscain
21	MF	Charles-Édouard Coridon	9 April 1973 (aged 30)	(French Football Federation) Lens
24	GK	Eddy Heurlie	27 December 1977 (aged 25)	(French Football Federation) Troyes

=== United States ===
Head coach: (United States) Bruce Arena

No.	Pos.	Player	Date of birth (age)	Club
2	DF	Frankie Hejduk	5 August 1974 (aged 28)	(United States Soccer Federation) Columbus Crew
3	DF	Greg Vanney	11 June 1974 (aged 29)	(French Football Federation) Bastia
4	DF	Carlos Bocanegra	25 May 1979 (aged 24)	(United States Soccer Federation) Chicago Fire
6	DF	Cory Gibbs	14 January 1980 (aged 23)	(German Football Association) FC St. Pauli
7	MF	Eddie Lewis	17 May 1974 (aged 29)	(The Football Association) Preston North End
8	MF	Earnie Stewart	28 March 1969 (aged 34)	(United States Soccer Federation) D.C. United
10	MF	Claudio Reyna	20 July 1973 (aged 29)	(The Football Association) Sunderland
11	FW	Clint Mathis	25 November 1976 (aged 26)	(United States Soccer Federation) MetroStars
12	DF	Danny Califf	17 March 1980 (aged 23)	(United States Soccer Federation) LA Galaxy
13	MF	Richard Mulrooney	3 November 1976 (aged 26)	(United States Soccer Federation) San Jose Earthquakes
15	DF	Bobby Convey	27 May 1983 (aged 20)	(United States Soccer Federation) D.C. United
17	MF	DaMarcus Beasley	24 May 1982 (aged 21)	(United States Soccer Federation) Chicago Fire
18	GK	Kasey Keller	29 November 1969 (aged 33)	(The Football Association) Tottenham Hotspur
19	MF	Steve Ralston	14 June 1974 (aged 29)	(United States Soccer Federation) New England Revolution
20	FW	Brian McBride	19 June 1972 (aged 31)	(United States Soccer Federation) Columbus Crew
21	FW	Landon Donovan	4 March 1982 (aged 21)	(United States Soccer Federation) San Jose Earthquakes
24	GK	Adin Brown	27 May 1978 (aged 25)	(United States Soccer Federation) New England Revolution
25	MF	Pablo Mastroeni	26 August 1976 (aged 26)	(United States Soccer Federation) Colorado Rapids

== Group D ==
=== Canada ===
Head coach: (Germany) Holger Osieck

No.	Pos.	Player	Date of birth (age)	Club
1	GK	Pat Onstad	13 January 1968 (aged 35)	(United States Soccer Federation) San Jose Earthquakes
2	DF	Paul Fenwick	25 August 1969 (aged 33)	(Scottish Football Association) Hibernian
3	MF	Richard Hastings	18 May 1977 (aged 26)	(Austrian Football Association) Grazer AK
4	DF	Nevio Pizzolito	26 August 1976 (aged 26)	(Canadian Soccer Association) Montreal Impact
5	DF	Jason DeVos	2 January 1974 (aged 29)	(The Football Association) Wigan Athletic
6	MF	Jason Bent	8 March 1977 (aged 26)	(The Football Association) Plymouth Argyle
7	MF	Paul Stalteri	18 October 1977 (aged 25)	(German Football Association) Werder Bremen
8	MF	Daniel Imhof	22 November 1977 (aged 25)	(Swiss Football Association) St. Gallen
9	FW	Carlo Corazzin	25 December 1971 (aged 31)	Unattached
10	DF	Kevin McKenna	21 January 1980 (aged 23)	(Scottish Football Association) Heart of Midlothian
11	MF	Martin Nash	27 December 1975 (aged 27)	(Canadian Soccer Association) Montreal Impact
12	DF	Nick Dasovic	5 December 1968 (aged 34)	(Canadian Soccer Association) Vancouver Whitecaps
13	MF	Davide Xausa	10 March 1976 (aged 27)	(Scottish Football Association) Livingston
14	MF	Atiba Hutchinson	8 February 1983 (aged 20)	(Swedish Football Association) Öster
15	MF	Maycoll Cañizalez	28 December 1982 (aged 20)	(German Football Association) Werder Bremen
16	DF	Chris Pozniak	10 January 1981 (aged 22)	(Swedish Football Association) Örebro
17	MF	Iain Hume	30 October 1983 (aged 19)	(The Football Association) Tranmere Rovers
22	GK	Lars Hirschfeld	17 October 1978 (aged 24)	(The Football Association) Tottenham Hotspur

=== Costa Rica ===
Head coach: (United States) Steve Sampson

No.	Pos.	Player	Date of birth (age)	Club
1	GK	Álvaro Mesén	24 December 1972 (aged 30)	(Costa Rican Football Federation) Alajuelense
3	DF	Luis Marín	10 August 1974 (aged 28)	(Costa Rican Football Federation) Alajuelense
4	DF	Alexander Castro	14 February 1979 (aged 24)	(Costa Rican Football Federation) Alajuelense
5	DF	Gilberto Martínez	1 October 1979 (aged 23)	(Italian Football Federation) Brescia Calcio
6	DF	Wilmer López	3 August 1971 (aged 31)	(Costa Rican Football Federation) Alajuelense
7	FW	Rolando Fonseca	6 June 1974 (aged 29)	(Costa Rican Football Federation) Alajuelense
8	MF	Mauricio Solís	13 December 1972 (aged 30)	(Hellenic Football Federation) OFI
10	MF	Walter Centeno	6 October 1974 (aged 28)	(Hellenic Football Federation) AEK Athens
12	DF	Leonardo González	21 November 1980 (aged 22)	(Costa Rican Football Federation) Herediano
13	MF	Daniel Vallejos	27 May 1981 (aged 22)	(Costa Rican Football Federation) Herediano
14	FW	Erick Scott	21 May 1981 (aged 22)	(Costa Rican Football Federation) Alajuelense
16	MF	Try Bennett	5 August 1975 (aged 27)	(Costa Rican Football Federation) Deportivo Saprissa
17	FW	Steven Bryce	16 August 1977 (aged 25)	(Costa Rican Football Federation) Alajuelense
19	DF	Mauricio Wright	20 December 1970 (aged 32)	(Hellenic Football Federation) AEK Athens
20	DF	Pablo Chinchilla	21 December 1978 (aged 24)	(Costa Rican Football Federation) Alajuelense
21	FW	Winston Parks	12 October 1981 (aged 21)	(Russian Football Union) Lokomotiv Moskva
22	DF	Carlos Castro	10 September 1978 (aged 24)	(Russian Football Union) Rubin Kazan
23	GK	Ricardo González	6 March 1974 (aged 29)	(Costa Rican Football Federation) Alajuelense

=== Cuba ===
Head coach: (Peru) Miguel Company

No.	Pos.	Player	Date of birth (age)	Club
1	GK	Odelin Molina	3 August 1974 (aged 28)	(Football Association of Cuba) FC Villa Clara
2	DF	Nayuri Rivero	20 September 1983 (aged 19)	(Football Association of Cuba) FC Matanzas
3	MF	Yenier Márquez	3 January 1979 (aged 24)	(Football Association of Cuba) FC Villa Clara
4	DF	Silvio Pedro Miñoso	23 December 1976 (aged 26)	(Football Association of Cuba) FC Villa Clara
5	DF	Alexander Cruzata	26 July 1974 (aged 28)	(Football Association of Cuba) FC Holguín
6	MF	Liván Pérez	1 January 1977 (aged 26)	(Football Association of Cuba) FC Ciego de Ávila
7	MF	Jorge Luis Ramírez	11 July 1977 (aged 26)	(Football Association of Cuba) CF Granma
8	FW	Eduardo Morales	5 March 1981 (aged 22)	(Football Association of Cuba) FC Matanzas
9	FW	Lázaro Darcourt	25 April 1971 (aged 32)	(Football Association of Cuba) FC Pinar del Río
10	FW	Lester Moré	13 September 1978 (aged 24)	(Football Association of Cuba) FC Ciego de Ávila
11	MF	René Estrada	1 January 1978 (aged 25)	(Football Association of Cuba) Industriales
12	GK	Alexis Revé	17 November 1972 (aged 30)	(Football Association of Cuba) FC Villa Clara
13	FW	Maykel Galindo	28 January 1981 (aged 22)	(Football Association of Cuba) FC Villa Clara
14	MF	Jaime Colomé	30 June 1979 (aged 24)	(Football Association of Cuba) Ciudad Habana
15	DF	Lázaro Ruiz	15 January 1978 (aged 25)	(Football Association of Cuba) FC Villa Clara
16	DF	Reysander Fernández	22 August 1984 (aged 18)	(Football Association of Cuba) FC Ciego de Ávila
17	FW	Pedro Adriani Faife	14 January 1984 (aged 19)	(Football Association of Cuba) FC Villa Clara
18	FW	Alain Cervantes	17 November 1983 (aged 19)	(Football Association of Cuba) FC Ciego de Ávila
