= 2004 Copa América Group B =

Group B of the 2004 Copa América was one of the three groups of competing nations in the 2004 Copa América. It comprised Argentina, Ecuador, Mexico, and Uruguay. Group play ran from 7 to 13 July 2004.

Mexico won the group and faced Brazil—the runners-up of Group C—in the quarter-finals. Argentina finished second and faced Peru—the runners-up of Group A—in the quarter-finals. Uruguay finished third and faced Paraguay, the winners of Group C, in the quarter-finals. Ecuador finished fourth in the group, and were eliminated from the tournament.

== Standings ==
| Team | Pld | W | D | L | GF | GA | GD | Pts |
|---|---|---|---|---|---|---|---|---|
| Mexico | 3 | 2 | 1 | 0 | 5 | 3 | +2 | 7 |
| Argentina | 3 | 2 | 0 | 1 | 10 | 4 | +6 | 6 |
| Uruguay | 3 | 1 | 1 | 1 | 6 | 7 | −1 | 4 |
| Ecuador | 3 | 0 | 0 | 3 | 3 | 10 | −7 | 0 |

Teams that advanced to the quarter-finals
- Group winners
- Group runners-up
- Best two third-placed teams among all groups

All times are in local, Peru Time (UTC−05:00).

== Matches ==
=== Mexico vs Uruguay ===
7 July 2004
17:30

| Mexico | 2–2 | Uruguay |
|---|---|---|
| Osorio 45+2'; Pardo 69' | Report | Bueno 43'; Montero 88' |

Estadio Elías Aguirre, Chiclayo
Attendance: 25,000
Referee: Gilberto Hidalgo (Peru)

| Mexico | Uruguay |

| GK | 1 | Oswaldo Sánchez |
| RB | 7 | Octavio Valdez |
| CB | 4 | Rafael Márquez | (yellow card) 27' |
| CB | 5 | Duilio Davino |
| LB | 18 | Salvador Carmona |
| DM | 20 | Ricardo Osorio | (yellow card) 63' |
| DM | 15 | David Oteo | | (substituted off) 83' |
| CM | 8 | Pável Pardo |
| AM | 19 | Jaime Lozano |
| CF | 9 | Jared Borgetti | | (substituted off) 67' |
| CF | 17 | Francisco Palencia | | (substituted off) 67' |
Substitutions:
| FW | 10 | Adolfo Bautista | | (substituted in) 67' |
| MF | 21 | Jesús Arellano | | (substituted in) 67' |
| DF | 22 | Héctor Altamirano | | (substituted in) 70' |
Manager:
(Argentina) Ricardo La Volpe

| GK | 12 | Luis Barbat |
| RB | 7 | Gustavo Varela | (yellow card) 22' |
| CB | 2 | Joe Bizera |
| CB | 4 | Paolo Montero |
| LB | 3 | Darío Rodríguez |
| CM | 8 | Omar Pouso | | (substituted off) 87' |
| CM | 5 | Marcelo Sosa |
| RW | 11 | Cristian Rodríguez |
| LW | 21 | Diego Forlán | | (substituted off) 74' |
| CF | 20 | Carlos Bueno |
| CF | 9 | Darío Silva | (yellow card) 31' | (substituted off) 78' |
Substitutions:
| MF | 10 | Juan Martín Parodi | (yellow card) 75' | (substituted in) 74' |
| FW | 18 | Richard Morales | (red card) 81' | (substituted in) 78' |
| FW | 22 | Vicente Sánchez | | (substituted in) 87' |
Manager:
Jorge Fossati

=== Argentina vs Ecuador ===
7 July 2004
19:45

| Argentina | 6–1 | Ecuador |
|---|---|---|
| K. González 5' (pen.); Saviola 64', 74', 79'; D'Alessandro 84'; L. González 90' | Report | Delgado 62' |

Estadio Elías Aguirre, Chiclayo
Attendance: 24,000
Referee: Carlos Amarilla (Paraguay)

| Argentina | Ecuador |

| GK | 1 | Roberto Abbondanzieri |
| RB | 8 | Javier Zanetti |
| CB | 2 | Roberto Ayala |
| CB | 6 | Gabriel Heinze |
| LB | 3 | Juan Pablo Sorín |
| CM | 5 | Javier Mascherano |
| CM | 16 | Lucho González |
| AM | 10 | Andrés D'Alessandro |
| RW | 19 | César Delgado | (substituted off) 70' |
| LW | 18 | Kily González | (substituted off) 87' |
| CF | 7 | Javier Saviola | (substituted off) 83' |
Substitutions:
| FW | 21 | Mauro Rosales | (substituted in) 70' |
| FW | 11 | Carlos Tevez | (substituted in) 83' |
| DF | 14 | Clemente Rodríguez | (substituted in) 87' |
Manager:
Marcelo Bielsa

| GK | 12 | Oswaldo Ibarra |
| RB | 4 | Ulises de la Cruz | | (substituted off) 54' |
| CB | 17 | Giovanny Espinoza |
| CB | 3 | Iván Hurtado |
| LB | 18 | Néicer Reasco |
| CM | 20 | Edwin Tenorio | | (substituted off) 30' |
| CM | 15 | Marlon Ayoví |
| AM | 5 | Alfonso Obregón |
| RW | 16 | Cléber Chalá |
| LW | 6 | Paúl Ambrosi |
| CF | 8 | Ebelio Ordóñez | | (substituted off) 46' |
Substitutions:
| FW | 7 | Franklin Salas | | (substituted in) 30' |
| FW | 11 | Agustín Delgado | | (substituted in) 46' |
| MF | 19 | Édison Méndez | (yellow card) 78' | (substituted in) 54' |
Manager:
(Colombia) Hernán Darío Gómez

=== Uruguay vs Ecuador ===
10 July 2004
17:30

| Uruguay | 2–1 | Ecuador |
|---|---|---|
| Forlán 61'; Bueno 78' | Report | Salas 73' |

Estadio Elías Aguirre, Chiclayo
Attendance: 25,000
Referee: Gustavo Brand (Venezuela)

| Uruguay | Ecuador |

| GK | 12 | Luis Barbat |
| RB | 7 | Gustavo Varela |
| CB | 2 | Joe Bizera |
| CB | 4 | Paolo Montero | (yellow card) 6' | (substituted off) 59' |
| LB | 3 | Darío Rodríguez |
| CM | 5 | Marcelo Sosa |
| CM | 8 | Omar Pouso |
| RW | 21 | Diego Forlán | | (substituted off) 68' |
| LW | 11 | Cristian Rodríguez | | (substituted off) 55' |
| CF | 9 | Darío Silva |
| CF | 20 | Carlos Bueno |
Substitutions:
| FW | 22 | Vicente Sánchez | | (substituted in) 55' |
| MF | 6 | Alejandro Lago | (yellow card) 75' | (substituted in) 59' |
| FW | 15 | Diego Pérez | | (substituted in) 68' |
Manager:
Jorge Fossati

| GK | 12 | Oswaldo Ibarra |
| RB | 4 | Ulises de la Cruz |
| CB | 3 | Iván Hurtado |
| CB | 17 | Giovanny Espinoza |
| LB | 18 | Néicer Reasco | (yellow card) 63' |
| CM | 20 | Edwin Tenorio | | (substituted off) 63' |
| CM | 5 | Alfonso Obregón |
| RW | 16 | Cléber Chalá | (yellow card) 76' |
| LW | 19 | Édison Méndez | (yellow card) 49' | (substituted off) 82' |
| CF | 10 | Álex Aguinaga |
| CF | 11 | Agustín Delgado |
Substitutions:
| FW | 7 | Franklin Salas | | (substituted in) 63' |
| FW | 8 | Ebelio Ordóñez | | (substituted in) 82' |
Manager:
(Colombia) Hernán Darío Gómez

=== Argentina vs Mexico ===
10 July 2004
19:45

| Argentina | 0–1 | Mexico |
|---|---|---|
| | Report | Morales 8' |

Estadio Elías Aguirre, Chiclayo
Attendance: 25,000
Referee: Márcio Rezende (Brazil)

| Argentina | Mexico |

| GK | 1 | Roberto Abbondanzieri |
| RB | 8 | Javier Zanetti | (yellow card) 45' |
| CB | 2 | Roberto Ayala |
| CB | 6 | Gabriel Heinze | (yellow card) 32' |
| LB | 3 | Juan Pablo Sorín | | (substituted off) 76' |
| CM | 5 | Javier Mascherano | (yellow card) 68' |
| CM | 16 | Lucho González | | (substituted off) 66' |
| AM | 10 | Andrés D'Alessandro | (yellow card) 78' |
| RW | 19 | César Delgado | | (substituted off) 66' |
| LW | 18 | Kily González |
| CF | 7 | Javier Saviola |
Substitutions:
| FW | 11 | Carlos Tevez | | (substituted in) 66' |
| FW | 21 | Mauro Rosales | | (substituted in) 66' |
| FW | 9 | Luciano Figueroa | | (substituted in) 76' |
Manager:
Marcelo Bielsa

| GK | 1 | Oswaldo Sánchez |
| RB | 20 | Ricardo Osorio |
| CB | 18 | Salvador Carmona | (yellow card) 78' |
| CB | 4 | Rafael Márquez |
| CB | 5 | Duilio Davino |
| LB | 3 | Omar Briceño | | (substituted off) 75' |
| CM | 8 | Pável Pardo | (yellow card) 88' |
| CM | 6 | Gerardo Torrado | (yellow card) 65' |
| RW | 21 | Jesús Arellano |
| LW | 14 | Ramón Morales | | (substituted off) 64' |
| CF | 9 | Jared Borgetti | (yellow card) 22' | (substituted off) 64' |
Substitutions:
| FW | 11 | Daniel Osorno | | (substituted in) 64' |
| DF | 22 | Héctor Altamirano | (yellow card) 68' | (substituted in) 64' |
| MF | 7 | Octavio Valdez | | (substituted in) 75' |
Manager:
(Argentina) Ricardo La Volpe

=== Mexico vs Ecuador ===
13 July 2004
17:30

| Mexico | 2–1 | Ecuador |
|---|---|---|
| Altamirano 23' (pen.); Bautista 42' | Report | Delgado 71' |

Estadio Miguel Grau, Piura
Attendance: 21,000
Referee: Eduardo Lecca (Peru)

| Mexico | Ecuador |

| GK | 1 | Oswaldo Sánchez |
| RB | 7 | Octavio Valdez |
| CB | 2 | Claudio Suárez |
| CB | 5 | Duilio Davino |
| LB | 22 | Héctor Altamirano |
| DM | 6 | Gerardo Torrado |
| DM | 3 | Omar Briceño |
| CM | 14 | Ramón Morales | | (substituted off) 28' |
| AM | 21 | Jesús Arellano | | (substituted off) 74' |
| CF | 10 | Adolfo Bautista | (yellow card) 42' | (substituted off) 60' |
| CF | 17 | Francisco Palencia |
Substitutions:
| MF | 19 | Jaime Lozano | (yellow card) 64' | (substituted in) 28' |
| DF | 16 | Mario Méndez | | (substituted in) 60' |
| FW | 11 | Daniel Osorno | | (substituted in) 74' |
Manager:
(Argentina) Ricardo La Volpe

| GK | 1 | Jacinto Espinoza | | (substituted off) 48' |
| RB | 4 | Ulises de la Cruz |
| CB | 3 | Iván Hurtado |
| CB | 17 | Giovanny Espinoza | | (substituted off) 48' |
| LB | 18 | Néicer Reasco |
| CM | 21 | Leonardo Soledispa | (yellow card) 83' |
| CM | 15 | Marlon Ayoví |
| RW | 16 | Cléber Chalá |
| LW | 10 | Álex Aguinaga | | (substituted off) 64' |
| CF | 11 | Agustín Delgado |
| CF | 13 | Luis Saritama |
Substitutions:
| GK | 22 | Damián Lanza | | (substituted in) 48' |
| FW | 7 | Franklin Salas | | (substituted in) 48' |
| FW | 9 | Gustavo Figueroa | | (substituted in) 64' |
Manager:
(Colombia) Hernán Darío Gómez

=== Argentina vs Uruguay ===
13 July 2004
19:45

| Argentina | 4–2 | Uruguay |
|---|---|---|
| K. González 19' (pen.); Figueroa 20', 89'; Ayala 80' | Report | Estoyanoff 7'; Sánchez 38' |

Estadio Miguel Grau, Piura
Attendance: 24,000
Referee: Rubén Selman (Chile)

| Argentina | Uruguay |

| GK | 1 | Roberto Abbondanzieri |
| CB | 2 | Roberto Ayala | (yellow card) 73' |
| CB | 8 | Javier Zanetti |
| CB | 6 | Gabriel Heinze |
| DM | 5 | Javier Mascherano | (yellow card) 64' |
| RM | 16 | Lucho González | | (substituted off) 79' |
| LM | 14 | Clemente Rodríguez | | (substituted off) 46' |
| AM | 10 | Andrés D'Alessandro |
| RW | 19 | César Delgado | | (substituted off) 76' |
| LW | 18 | Kily González |
| CF | 9 | Luciano Figueroa |
Substitutions:
| FW | 7 | Javier Saviola | | (substituted in) 79' |
| FW | 11 | Carlos Tevez | | (substituted in) 76' |
| DF | 17 | Mariano González | | (substituted in) 46' |
Manager:
Marcelo Bielsa

| GK | 12 | Luis Barbat |
| RB | 17 | Carlos Diogo | (yellow card) 28' |
| CB | 6 | Alejandro Lago |
| CB | 2 | Joe Bizera | (yellow card) 5' (yellow-red card) 35' |
| LB | 3 | Darío Rodríguez |
| CM | 15 | Diego Pérez |
| CM | 5 | Marcelo Sosa | (yellow card) 19' | (substituted off) 86' |
| RW | 13 | Fabián Estoyanoff | | (substituted off) 43' |
| LW | 16 | Javier Delgado |
| CF | 21 | Diego Forlán |
| CF | 22 | Vicente Sánchez | | (substituted off) 71' |
Substitutions:
| DF | 14 | Guillermo Rodríguez | | (substituted in) 43' |
| MF | 11 | Cristian Rodríguez | | (substituted in) 71' |
| FW | 20 | Carlos Bueno | | (substituted in) 86' |
Manager:
Jorge Fossati
