= 2010 South American Footballer of the Year =

Award

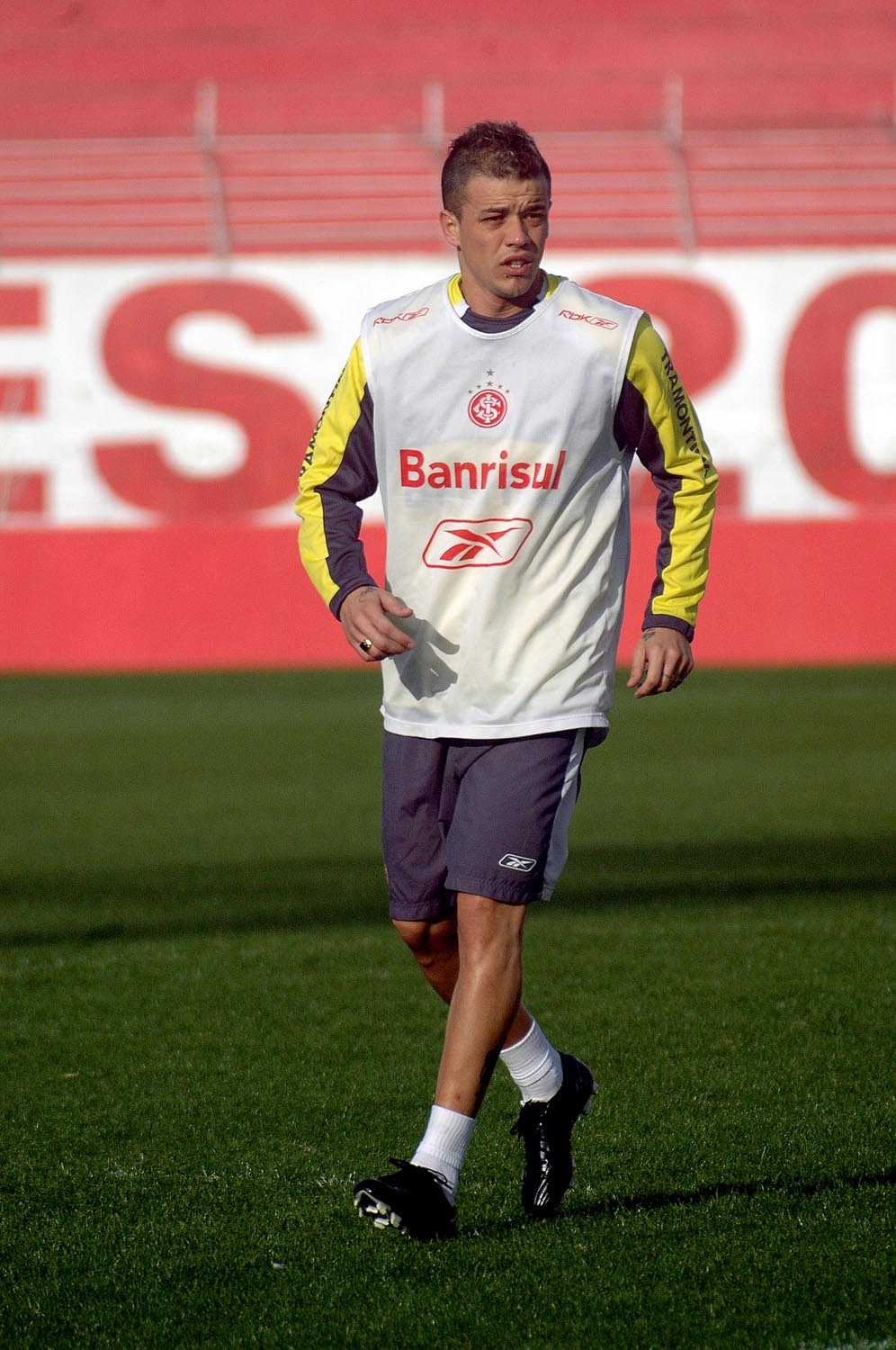
Andrés D'Alessandro is the South American Footballer of the Year for 2010.

The 2010 South American Footballer of the Year, given to the best football player in South America by Uruguayan newspaper El País through voting by journalists across the continent, was awarded to Andrés D'Alessandro of Internacional on December 30, 2010.

Andrés D'Alessandro won the award for the first time ahead of two-time holder Juan Sebastián Verón. D'Alessandro became the second Inter player to win the award.

== Rankings ==
| Rank | Player | Nationality | Club | Points |
|---|---|---|---|---|
| 1 | Andrés D'Alessandro | Argentina | (Brazil) Internacional | 61 |
| 2 | Juan Sebastián Verón | Argentina | (Argentina) Estudiantes | 51 |
| 3 | Neymar | Brazil | (Brazil) Santos | 47 |
| 4 | Darío Conca | Argentina | (Brazil) Fluminense | 46 |
| 5 | Santiago Silva | Uruguay | (Argentina) Vélez Sársfield | 35 |
| 6 | Mauricio Victorino | Uruguay | Universidad de Chile | 33 |
| 7 | Hilario Navarro | Argentina | (Argentina) Independiente | 28 |
| 8 | Néicer Reasco | Ecuador | (Ecuador) LDU Quito | 26 |
| 9 | Egidio Arévalo | Uruguay | (Uruguay) Peñarol | 24 |
| 9 | Leandro Desábato | Argentina | (Argentina) Estudiantes | 24 |
| 9 | Giuliano | Brazil | (Brazil) Internacional | 24 |
| 12 | Pablo Guiñazú | Argentina | (Brazil) Internacional | 23 |
| 13 | Humberto Suazo | Chile | (Mexico) Monterrey | 19 |
| 14 | Thiago Ribeiro | Brazil | (Brazil) Cruzeiro | 17 |
| 14 | Martín Silva | Uruguay | (Uruguay) Defensor Sporting | 17 |
| 16 | Bolívar | Brazil | (Brazil) Internacional | 14 |
| 16 | Guillermo Ochoa | Mexico | (Mexico) América | 14 |
| 18 | Kléber | Brazil | (Brazil) Palmeiras | 13 |
| 18 | Rogério Ceni | Brazil | (Brazil) São Paulo | 13 |
| 20 | Roberto Carlos | Brazil | (Brazil) Corinthians | 11 |
| 20 | Gary Medel | Chile | (Argentina) Boca Juniors | 11 |
| 20 | Walter Montillo | Argentina | (Brazil) Cruzeiro | 11 |
| 20 | Miguel Pinto | Chile | Universidad de Chile | 11 |
| 24 | Giovanni Moreno | Colombia | (Argentina) Racing | 10 |
| 24 | Renan | Brazil | (Brazil) Internacional | 10 |
| 26 | Juan Pablo Carrizo | Argentina | (Argentina) River Plate | 9 |
| 26 | Luis Ernesto Michel | Mexico | (Mexico) Guadalajara | 9 |
| 26 | Victor | Brazil | (Brazil) Grêmio | 9 |
| 29 | Norberto Araujo | Argentina | (Ecuador) LDU Quito | 8 |
| 29 | Fábio | Brazil | (Brazil) Cruzeiro | 8 |
| 29 | Índio | Brazil | (Brazil) Internacional | 8 |
| 29 | Rodrigo Mora | Uruguay | (Uruguay) Defensor Sporting | 8 |
| 33 | Rodrigo Braña | Argentina | (Argentina) Estudiantes | 7 |
| 33 | José Francisco Cevallos | Ecuador | (Ecuador) LDU Quito | 7 |
| 35 | Sebastián Abreu | Uruguay | (Brazil) Botafogo | 6 |
| 35 | Ulises de la Cruz | Ecuador | (Ecuador) LDU Quito | 6 |
| 35 | Nei | Brazil | (Brazil) Internacional | 6 |
| 35 | Agustín Orión | Argentina | (Argentina) Estudiantes | 6 |
| 35 | Emiliano Papa | Argentina | (Argentina) Vélez Sársfield | 6 |
| 40 | Marcos Assunção | Brazil | (Brazil) Palmeiras | 5 |
| 40 | Diego Barreto | Paraguay | (Paraguay) Cerro Porteño | 5 |
| 40 | Omar Bravo | Mexico | (Mexico) Guadalajara | 5 |
| 40 | Fabián Cubero | Argentina | (Argentina) Vélez Sársfield | 5 |
| 40 | Rafael Moura | Brazil | (Brazil) Goiás | 5 |
| 40 | Jorge Valdivia | Chile | (Brazil) Palmeiras | 5 |
| 46 | Alex Silva | Brazil | (Brazil) São Paulo | 4 |
| 46 | Elias | Brazil | (Brazil) Atlético Goianiense | 4 |
| 46 | Jorge Guagua | Ecuador | (Ecuador) LDU Quito | 4 |
| 46 | Leo Moura | Brazil | (Brazil) Flamengo | 4 |
| 46 | Lucas Mareque | Argentina | (Argentina) Independiente | 4 |
| 46 | Mariano | Brazil | (Brazil) Fluminense | 4 |
| 46 | Juan Manuel Martínez | Argentina | (Argentina) Vélez Sársfield | 4 |
| 46 | Sebastián Peratta | Argentina | (Argentina) Newell's Old Boys | 4 |
| 46 | Enzo Pérez | Argentina | (Argentina) Estudiantes | 4 |
| 46 | Pedro Sarabia | Paraguay | (Paraguay) Libertad | 4 |
| 46 | Andrés Scotti | Uruguay | (Chile) Colo-Colo | 4 |
