= Víctor Manuel Aguado =

Mexican footballer and manager (born 1960)

Personal information
- Full name: Víctor Manuel Aguado Malvido
- Date of birth: 1 April 1960 (age 66)
- Place of birth: Mexico City, Mexico
- Position: Goalkeeper

Senior career*
Years	Team	Apps	(Gls)
1982–1985	León		
1989–1991	Leones Negros		
1991–1992	Santos Laguna		

International career
1983–1984	Mexico	3	(0)

Managerial career
- 1997–1998: Veracruz
- 1998: Cruz Azul Hidalgo
- 2003: Guatemala
- 2006: América
- * Club domestic league appearances and goals

Víctor Manuel Aguado Malvido (Note: In this Spanish name, the first or paternal surname is Aguado and the second or maternal family name is Malvido.) (born 1 April 1960) is a Mexican former football player and manager.

== Playing career ==
In 1987, Aguado signed for Mexican side Leones Negros, helping them win the 1990–91 Copa México, their only major trophy.

== Managerial career ==
In 2003, he was appointed manager of Guatemala. In 2006, he was appointed manager of América in the Mexican top flight.
