= Mynor González =

Guatemalan footballer

Personal information
- Full name: Mynor Iván González León
- Date of birth: 16 August 1982 (age 44)
- Place of birth: Guatemala City, Guatemala
- Height: 1.78 m (5 ft 10 in)
- Position: Defender

College career
Years	Team	Apps	(Gls)
2003–2006	SMU Mustangs	88	(13)

International career
- Guatemala U20
- Guatemala U21
- Guatemala U23
2003–2005	Guatemala	7	(0)

Mynor Iván González León (born 16 August 1982) is a Guatemalan former footballer. After receiving his MBA from the Wharton School of the University of Pennsylvania, he now serves as the Vice President of Financial Planning and Analysis at Topgolf.

== Career statistics ==
=== International ===
National team	Year	Apps	Goals
Guatemala	2003	5	0
Guatemala	2005	2	0
Total		7	0
