= Julio Castro (footballer) =

Chilean footballer

Personal information
- Full name: Julio Alfonso Castro Gutiérrez
- Date of birth: 19 August 1996 (age 30)
- Place of birth: Talca, Chile
- Height: 1.78 m (5 ft 10 in)
- Position: Forward

Youth career
- 2005–2016: Rangers

Senior career*
Years	Team	Apps	(Gls)
2017	Rangers	3	(0)
2018–2019	Deportes Linares	–	(–)
2020–2022	Unión San Felipe	73	(21)
2023–2024	Cobresal	18	(4)
2024–2025	Deportes Temuco	28	(4)
- * Club domestic league appearances and goals as of 26 January 2026

Julio Alfonso Castro Gutiérrez (born 19 August 1996) is a Chilean footballer who plays as a forward.

== Club career ==
Born in Talca, Chile, Castro was trained at Rangers de Talca and made his professional debut in 2017. The next two seasons, he played for Deportes Linares, winning the 2019 Tercera A, scoring 19 goals. He was awarded as the best amateur player in Chilean football by Círculo de Periodistas Deportivos de Chile (CPD) (Sports Journalists Circle of Chile).

In January 2020, Castro joined Unión San Felipe and spent three years with them.

In 2023, Castro signed with Cobresal in the Chilean Primera División and took part in the 2023 Copa Sudamericana and the 2024 Copa Libertadores. He also was a regular player during the 2023 Chilean Primera División, where they were the runners-up.

On 8 July 2024, Castro signed with Deportes Temuco. He suffered an ACL injury on 2 July 2025 in the match against Audax Italiano for the Copa Chile.

== Personal life ==
In 2019, Castro graduated as a fitness coach.
