= Luis Marín (footballer, born 1974) =

Costa Rican footballer

Personal information
- Full name: Luis Antonio Marín Murillo
- Date of birth: 10 August 1974 (age 52)
- Place of birth: San José, Costa Rica
- Height: 1.80 m (5 ft 11 in)
- Position: Centre-back

Team information
- Current team: Inter FA (Manager)

Senior career*
Years	Team	Apps	(Gls)
1992–1993	Carmelita	13	(1)
1993–1998	Alajuelense	104	(6)
1998–1999	USAC	15	(0)
1999–2000	River Plate	6	(0)
2000–2006	Alajuelense	222	(8)
2006–2009	Maccabi Netanya	93	(2)
2009–2011	Alajuelense	69	(3)
Total		523	(21)

International career
1993–2009	Costa Rica	128	(5)

Managerial career
- 2011: LD Alajuelense (assistant)
- 2011–2018: Costa Rica (assistant)
- 2014–2015: Costa Rica U21 (assistant)
- 2019–2020: San Carlos
- 2020–2021: Santos
- 2021: Herediano
- 2021: Alajuelense
- 2022–2024: Pérez Zeledón
- 2025: Sporting San José
- 2025–: Inter FA
- * Club domestic league appearances and goals

Luis Antonio Marín Murillo (born 10 August 1974) is a Costa Rican former professional footballer, who played as a centre-back, and former captain of the Costa Rica national team. He is currently the manager of Inter FA.

Marin was regarded to be one of the finest Costa Rican footballers of his generation.

== Club career ==
Marín was born in the Calderón Guardia Hospital in San José, Costa Rica and grew up in Concepción de Tres Ríos. He made his professional debut for Carmelita on 13 September 1992 against Alajuelense, before moving to Alajuelense themselves. In 1998, he moved abroad to play for Guatemalan side USAC alongside compatriots Try Bennett and Benjamín Mayorga and in 1999 he played in Uruguay for River Plate. In 2000, he returned to Alajuelense.

In 2006, Marín left Liga for another spell abroad, moving to Israeli outfit Maccabi Netanya. After 3 seasons with Netanya, winning a total of 113 caps, scoring 2 goals in all club competitions and becoming a fan favorite earning the nickname "superman", Marin left the club in summer 2009 for a final spell at Alajuelense. He announced his retirement in April 2011.

== International career ==
Marín made his debut for Costa Rica in a June 1993 friendly match against Panama and earned a total of 128 caps, scoring 5 goals. He represented his country in 41 FIFA World Cup qualification matches and played in all 3 games during both the 2002 and 2006 FIFA World Cups. He also played at the 1997, 1999, 2001 and 2003 UNCAF Nations Cups as well as at the 1993,1998, 2002 and 2003 CONCACAF Gold Cups and the 2001 and 2004 Copa Américas. He also was a non-playing squad member at the 1997 Copa América.

He played his final game for the national team on 18 November 2009, where they tied 1–1 to Uruguay. The game meant that Costa Rica would not be in the 2010 FIFA World Cup. In Israel his nickname was "Superman".

=== International goals ===
Scores and results list Costa Rica's goal tally first, score column indicates score after each Marín goal.

List of international goals scored by Luis Marín Murillo
No.	Date	Venue	Opponent	Score	Result	Competition
1.	16 November 1997	Estadio Ricardo Saprissa Aymá, San José, Costa Rica	Canada	3–1	3–1	1998 FIFA World Cup qualification
2.	23 May 2001	Estadio Olímpico Metropolitano, San Pedro Sula, Honduras	Belize	3–0	4–0	2001 UNCAF Nations Cup
3.	20 June 2001	Estadio Alejandro Morera Soto, Alajuela, Costa Rica	Jamaica	1–0	2–1	2002 FIFA World Cup qualification
4.	19 November 2003	Estadio Alejandro Morera Soto, Alajuela, Costa Rica	Finland	1–0	2–1	Friendly match
5.	11 July 2004	Estadio Universidad Nacional San Agustín, Arequipa, Peru	Brazil	1–4	1–4	2004 Copa América

== Managerial career ==
After retiring in May 2011, Marín was appointed assistant to manager Oscar Ramírez at Alajuelense and was named assistant national coach for the 2014 UNCAF Nations Cup would Jorge Luis Pinto decide to resign as national team manager.

== Personal life ==
Marín is married to Elizabeth Chavarría and they have two daughters and a son.

== Honours ==
=== As a player ===
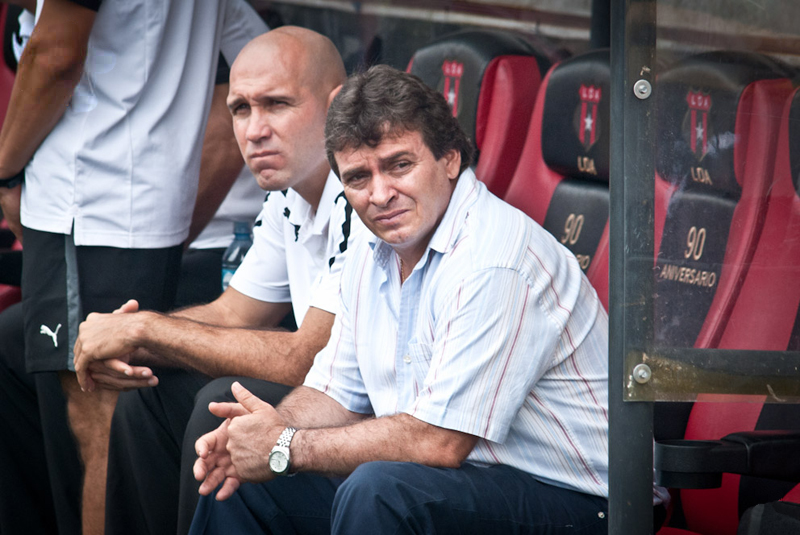
Marín as assistant coach of Óscar Ramírez in Alajuelense

Alajuelense

- Primera División (8): 1995–96, 1996–97, 2000–01, 2001–02, 2002–03, 2004–05, Invierno 2010, Verano 2011; runner-up: 1993–94, 1994–95, 1997–98
- CONCACAF Champions' Cup: 2004
- Copa Interclubes UNCAF: 1996, 2002, 2005

Maccabi Netanya

- Israeli Premier League runner-up: 2006–07, 2007–08

Costa Rica

- UNCAF Nations Cup: 1997, 1999, 2003; runner-up 2001

Individual

- Israeli Premier League Best Foreign Player of the Year: 2006–07

=== As a manager ===
- Primera División de Costa Rica: Clausura 2019

== See also ==
- List of men's footballers with 100 or more international caps
