= Alex Varas =

Chilean footballer (born 1976)

Personal information
- Full name: Alex Fabián Varas Rubio
- Date of birth: 26 March 1976 (age 50)
- Place of birth: Santiago, Chile
- Height: 6 ft 0 in (1.83 m)
- Position: Goalkeeper

Youth career
- Universidad de Chile
- Universidad Católica

Senior career*
Years	Team	Apps	(Gls)
1994–1999	Universidad Católica	13	(0)
1996	→ Coquimbo Unido (loan)	7	(0)
1999	Universidad Católica B	–	(–)
2000	Audax Italiano	0	(0)
2001–2004	Santiago Wanderers	100	(0)
2005	Audax Italiano	10	(0)
2005–2006	Colo-Colo	16	(0)
2007	Universidad de Concepción	11	(0)
2008	Santiago Wanderers	22	(0)
Total		179	(0)

International career
1995–2004	Chile	7	(0)
- * Club domestic league appearances and goals

Alex Fabián Varas Rubio (born March 26, 1976) is a retired Chilean Association football goalkeeper.

== Career ==
He began his career with Universidad Católica where he played four seasons. He spent one season with Coquimbo Unido. Varas spent separate one-year spells with Audax Italiano before and after spending four seasons with Santiago Wanderers.

His last club was Santiago Wanderers in 2008.

Varas has appeared seven times for the Chile national team. His international debut was on March 29, 1995, against Mexico.

== Post-retirement ==
Varas became a football agent and a ontological coach.

== Honours ==
Universidad Católica

- Copa Chile (1): 1995
- Primera División de Chile (1): 1997 Apertura

Santiago Wanderers

- Primera División de Chile (1): 2001

Colo-Colo

- Primera División de Chile (2): 2006 Apertura, 2006 Clausura
