= Alejandro Lago =

Uruguayan footballer (born 1979)

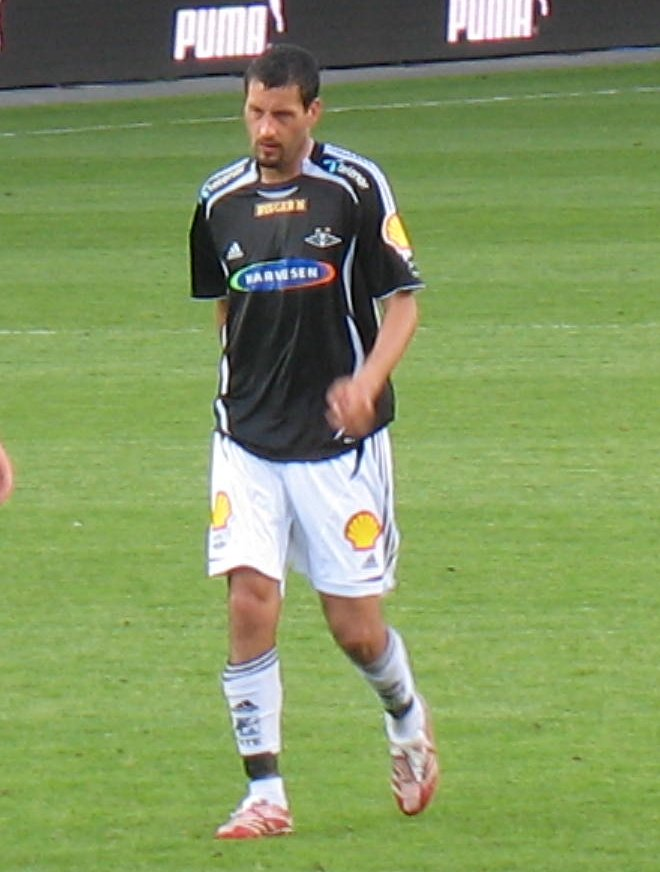

Personal information
- Full name: Eduardo Alejandro Lago Correa
- Date of birth: 28 June 1979 (age 47)
- Place of birth: Montevideo, Uruguay
- Height: 1.86 m (6 ft 1 in)
- Position: Central defender

Senior career*
Years	Team	Apps	(Gls)
2000–2002	Fénix	115	(3)
2003	→ Peñarol (loan)	26	(0)
2005–2011	Rosenborg	82	(0)
2006	→ Bella Vista (loan)	12	(1)
2006	→ IFK Göteborg (loan)	12	(2)
2012–2013	Montevideo Wanderers	27	(0)
2013–2014	Cerro	9	(0)
2014–2015	Progreso	10	(0)

International career
2003–2004	Uruguay	16	(0)
- * Club domestic league appearances and goals as of 14 May 2014

Eduardo Alejandro Lago Correa (born 28 June 1979 in Montevideo) is a Uruguayan former footballer. A central defender, he last played for Progreso in the Uruguayan Segunda División. He has earned league championships with both Peñarol and Rosenborg, and he was part of the Uruguay squad that came on third place in Copa América 2004.

== Career ==
Lago has played for the Uruguay national football team and won the Uruguayan league title with his club Peñarol in 2003. Lago was bought by Rosenborg in 2005, alongside countryman Sebastián Eguren. The stay was not a success for the two players, and in January 2006 they were both loaned out to SK Brann. However, on 8 February it was announced that the transfer of both Lago and Eguren was cancelled due to "psychological reasons".

February 2006, Lago was on loan to C.A. Bella Vista (Uruguay). Later, he went back to Scandinavia, and was on loan to the Swedish club IFK Göteborg, from 1 July to 31 December 2006. The Swedish club announced that they did not want to sign Lago on a permanent basis, so he returned to Rosenborg in January 2007. After his return to Rosenborg he became more successful with 18 appearances in the 2008 season and 23 in the 2009 season.

== Career statistics ==
Club	Season	Division	League		Cup		Total	
Club	Season	Division	Apps	Goals	Apps	Goals	Apps	Goals
2005	Rosenborg	Tippeligaen	8	0	0	0	8	0
2006	IFK Göteborg	Allsvenskan	12	1	0	0	12	1
2007	Rosenborg	Tippeligaen	4	0	4	0	8	0
2008	Rosenborg	Tippeligaen	18	0	2	0	20	0
2009	Rosenborg	Tippeligaen	24	0	3	1	27	1
2010	Rosenborg	Tippeligaen	7	0	3	0	10	0
2011	Rosenborg	Tippeligaen	21	0	3	0	24	0
2011–12	Montevideo	Primera División	13	0	0	0	13	0
2012–13	Montevideo	Primera División	14	0	0	0	14	0
2013–14	Cerro	Primera División	9	0	0	0	9	0
Career Total			130	1	15	1	145	2

== Honours ==
=== Club ===
Peñarol

- Primera División: 2003

Rosenborg BK

- Norwegian Premier League Championship: 2009, 2010

=== Country ===
- Copa América third place 2004
