= Omar Pouso =

Uruguayan footballer (born 1980)

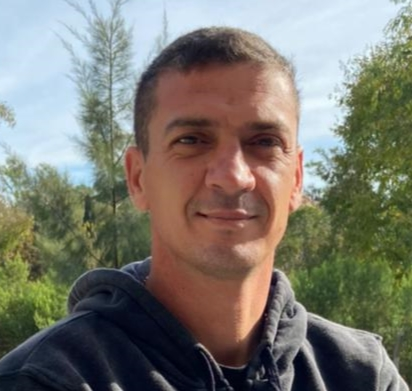
- Omar Pouso

Personal information
- Full name: Omar Heber Pouso Osores
- Date of birth: 28 February 1980 (age 46)
- Place of birth: Mercedes, Uruguay
- Height: 1.80 m (5 ft 11 in)
- Position: Midfielder

Youth career
- Bristol
- 1993–1998: Danubio

Senior career*
| Years | Team | Apps | (Gls) |
| 1998–2006 | Danubio | 183 | (19) |
| 2006–2007 | Peñarol | 27 | (2) |
| 2006–2007 | → Charlton Athletic (loan) | 1 | (0) |
| 2007–2012 | Libertad | 120 | (13) |
| 2012–2016 | Gimnasia La Plata | 88 | (2) |
| Total | | 419 | (36) |

International career
| 1999 | Uruguay U20 | 10 | (0) |
| 2004–2007 | Uruguay | 15 | (1) |

Managerial career
- 2017–2019: Argentino Junior Darregueira
- 2020: Real Pilar (assistant)
- 2021: Real Pilar
- 2021: Defensor Sporting (assistant)
- 2022: Palestino (assistant)
- 2022–2023: Bolivia (assistant)
- * Club domestic league appearances and goals

Omar Heber Pouso Osores (born 28 February 1980) is a Uruguayan football coach and a former midfielder.

== Club career ==
Pouso came to Danubio at the age of 13 from Club Atlético Bristol and made his professional debut in 1998.

Pouso moved to Europe in August 2006 when he joined Charlton Athletic of the Premier League on a season-long loan from Peñarol. He played his only league match the following month in a 1–0 home defeat to Portsmouth, in which he was substituted after 57 minutes. Pouso was signed by Iain Dowie, and was released alongside compatriot Gonzalo Sorondo by new manager Alan Pardew in February 2007.

In February 2012, he joined Gimnasia in Argentina, where he played until his retirement in 2016.

== International career ==
At under-20 level, Pouso represented Uruguay in both the 1999 South American Championship and the 1999 FIFA World Championship.

Pouso has 15 caps for Uruguay and scored one goal, a volley in a friendly international against England at Anfield in March 2006.

== Coaching career ==
Pouso started a career as coach with Club Atlético Argentino Junior Darregueira in 2019. The next year, he worked for Real Pilar

As an assistant coach, he has served for Defensor Sporting under Leonel Rocco and both Palestino and the Bolivia national team under Gustavo Costas.

== Career statistics ==
=== International ===
Appearances and goals by national team and year
| National team | Year | Apps | Goals |
|---|---|---|---|
| Uruguay | 2004 | 5 | 0 |
| Uruguay | 2005 | 3 | 0 |
| Uruguay | 2006 | 6 | 1 |
| Uruguay | 2007 | 1 | 0 |
| Total | | 15 | 1 |

Scores and results list Uruguay's goal tally first, score column indicates score after each Pouso goal.

List of international goals scored by Omar Pouso
| No. | Date | Venue | Opponent | Score | Result | Competition |
|---|---|---|---|---|---|---|
| 1 | 1 March 2006 | Anfield, Liverpool, England | England | 1–0 | 1–2 | Friendly |
