= Marcelo Sosa =

Uruguayan footballer (born 1978)

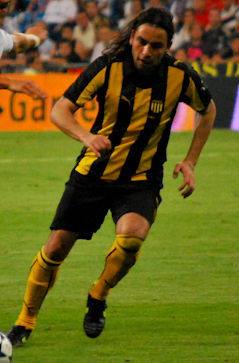
- Sosa in action for Peñarol in 2010

Personal information
- Full name: Marcelo Fabián Sosa Farías
- Date of birth: 2 June 1978 (age 48)
- Place of birth: Montevideo, Uruguay
- Height: 1.78 m (5 ft 10 in)
- Position: Midfielder

Senior career*
Years	Team	Apps	(Gls)
1996–2003	Danubio	155	(17)
2004	Spartak Moscow	8	(0)
2004–2006	Atlético Madrid	28	(0)
2005–2006	→ Osasuna (loan)	11	(0)
2006	→ River Plate (loan)	2	(0)
2007	Nacional	22	(1)
2008–2009	Tecos UAG	35	(0)
2009–2010	Peñarol	20	(2)
2011–2012	Racing Montevideo	28	(1)
2012–2013	Danubio	18	(0)
Total		327	(21)

International career
2003–2005	Uruguay	27	(2)
- * Club domestic league appearances and goals

Marcelo Fabián Sosa Farías (born 2 June 1978) is a Uruguayan former footballer who played as a defensive midfielder.

His nickname is "Pato" – Spanish for duck – and he played professionally for clubs in five countries.

== Club career ==
Born in Montevideo, Sosa started his career at Danubio FC, being a mainstay for several seasons. In January 2004 he joined FC Spartak Moscow on a four-year deal, but only six months later he moved to Atlético Madrid in Spain on a free transfer, signing a three-year link with the La Liga club.

Although he appeared in 28 league games during the campaign, Sosa failed to impress, being loaned to fellow league side CA Osasuna where he was used rarely during the Navarrese's historical season (a fourth place). He added two contests in the UEFA Cup.

After another loan, at Club Atlético River Plate in January 2007, Sosa was allowed to join hometown's Club Nacional de Football on another free transfer, despite still having a six-month contract left with Atlético Madrid. On 7 January 2008, Tecos UAG officially presented him to the Guadalajara-area media.

In the 2009 summer 31-year-old Sosa returned to his country, signing with national powerhouse C.A. Peñarol. In early February 2011 he joined fellow Primera División team Racing Club de Montevideo, on a six-month contract.

== International career ==
Having first appeared for Uruguay in 2003, Sosa represented the nation at the 2004 Copa América, playing in all the matches for a final third-place.
