= Juan Martín Parodi =

Uruguayan footballer (born 1974)

Personal information
- Full name: Juan Martín Parodi Gonzalez
- Date of birth: 22 September 1974 (age 52)
- Place of birth: Paysandú, Uruguay
- Height: 1.71 m (5 ft 7 in)
- Position: Midfielder

Senior career*
Years	Team	Apps	(Gls)
1993–1996	Nacional		
1997–1998	Deportivo Español	51	(13)
1998–1999	Toros Neza	30	(3)
1999–2000	Huracán de Tres Arroyos	12	(1)
2000–2002	Cañeros Zacatepec		
2002–2003	Colón	30	(3)
2003–2004	Panionios	37	(7)
2005	Olimpia		
2006–2007	Al Ahli		
2007–2008	Defensor Sporting	15	(3)
2008	Deportivo Pereira	23	(4)
2009–2010	Olympiacos Volos	11	(0)
2010	Deportivo Pereira	3	(1)

International career
2004	Uruguay	3	(0)
- * Club domestic league appearances and goals as of 17 July 2010

Juan Martín Parodi (Spanish pronunciation: [ˈxwam maɾˈtim paˈɾoði]; born 22 September 1974 in Paysandú) is a retired Uruguayan footballer.

== Club career ==
Parodi has spent most of his career in Uruguay, Argentina, Mexico and Greece, notably playing for Nacional in the Primera División Uruguaya as well as Deportivo Español and Colón in the Primera División de Argentina, Toros Neza in the Primera División de México, and Olympiacos Volos in the Beta Ethniki. He last played for Colombian side Deportivo Pereira.

== International career ==
Parodi made three appearances for the senior Uruguay national football team during 2004.
