= Derlis González (footballer, born 1978) =

Paraguayan footballer

Personal information
- Full name: Derlis Aníbal González
- Date of birth: 25 May 1978 (age 48)
- Place of birth: Itauguá, Paraguay
- Height: 1.74 m (5 ft 9 in)
- Position: Defender

International career
| Years | Team | Apps | (Gls) |
| 2004 | Paraguay | 4 | (0) |

Derlis Aníbal González (born 25 May 1978) is a Paraguayan footballer. He played in four matches for the Paraguay national football team in 2004. He was also part of Paraguay's squad for the 2004 Copa América tournament.
