= Javier Delgado (Uruguayan footballer) =

Uruguayan footballer (born 1975)

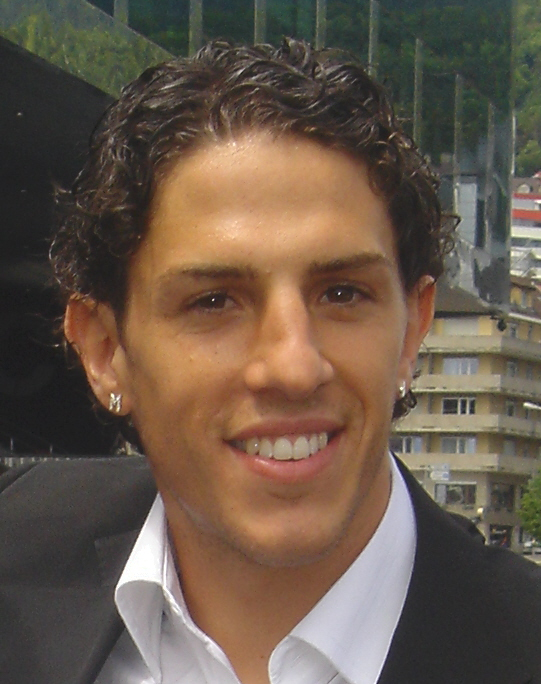

Personal information
- Full name: Javier Omar Delgado Papariello
- Date of birth: July 8, 1975 (age 51)
- Place of birth: Montevideo, Uruguay
- Height: 1.82 m (5 ft 11 1/2 in)
- Position: Midfielder

Senior career*
Years	Team	Apps	(Gls)
1994–1995	Danubio	0	(0)
1994–1995	Newell's Old Boys	5	(0)
1996–2000	Danubio	95	(27)
2000–2004	Colón de Santa Fe	135	(20)
2004–2005	Saturn Moscow Oblast	26	(2)
2005–2007	Nacional	27	(4)
2007	Universidad de Chile	8	(0)
2008	Deportivo Cali	14	(1)
2008–2009	Danubio	22	(1)
2009–2010	Central Español	9	(0)
2010	Deportes Concepción	13	(0)
2011–2012	Rampla Juniors	6	(0)

International career^{‡}
1996–2005	Uruguay	14	(0)
- * Club domestic league appearances and goals as of 19 August 2007 ‡ National team caps and goals as of 19 August 2007

Javier Omar Delgado Papariello (born July 8, 1975) is a former Uruguayan footballer. He last played for Rampla Juniors in the Uruguayan Primera Division. He played as a midfielder.
