= Luis Barbat =

Uruguayan football goalkeeper (born 1968)

Personal information
- Full name: Luis Alberto Barbat Hudema
- Date of birth: June 17, 1968 (age 58)
- Place of birth: Montevideo, Uruguay
- Height: 1.84 m (6 ft 0 in)
- Position: Goalkeeper

Senior career*
Years	Team	Apps	(Gls)
1985	Progreso		
1986–1988	Estudiantes		
1989–1992	Liverpool Montevideo		
1993–1994	Independiente Medellín	98	(1)
1995	Colo-Colo	5	(0)
1996–1999	Deportes Tolima	96	(4)
2000–2002	América de Cali	108	(0)
2003–2005	Danubio	87	(0)
2006	Central Español	51	(0)
2007	Atlético Bucaramanga	28	(0)
2008	Boston River	12	(0)
2008–2009	Juventud Las Piedras	10	(0)
2009	Progreso		

International career
1991–2004	Uruguay	14	(0)
- * Club domestic league appearances and goals

Luis Alberto Barbat Hudema (born June 17, 1968) is an Uruguayan former football goalkeeper.

== Club career ==
In 1995, Barbat played in Chile for Colo-Colo.

1997 - Barbat arrives to Deportes Tolima. His team classifies to Conmebol Cup. Barbat scores 2 penalty kick goals against Deportivo Cali.
2001 - Barbat was key figure for América de Cali, to obtain 11th professional title for this team.

== International career ==
Barbat played for Uruguay's national team at Copa America 2004, after an injury suffered by Goalkeeper Fabian Carini. Uruguay finished 3rd after beating Colombia 2–1.
Barbat was called by Juan Ramón Carrasco to be part of Uruguay national football team during the 2006 FIFA World Cup qualifying campaign. He made his debut in a friendly match against Brazil (1–0 win) on April 30, 1992, in the Estadio Centenario in Montevideo under coach Luis Alberto Cubilla.
