= Cristian Badilla =

Costa Rican footballer (born 1978)

Personal information
- Date of birth: 11 July 1978 (age 48)
- Position: Midfielder

International career
| Years | Team | Apps | (Gls) |
| 2004–2005 | Costa Rica | 15 | (0) |

Cristian Badilla (born 11 July 1978) is a Costa Rican former footballer. He played in 15 matches for the Costa Rica national football team from 2004 to 2005. He was also part of Costa Rica's squad for the 2004 Copa América tournament.
