= Andrés D'Alessandro =

Argentine footballer

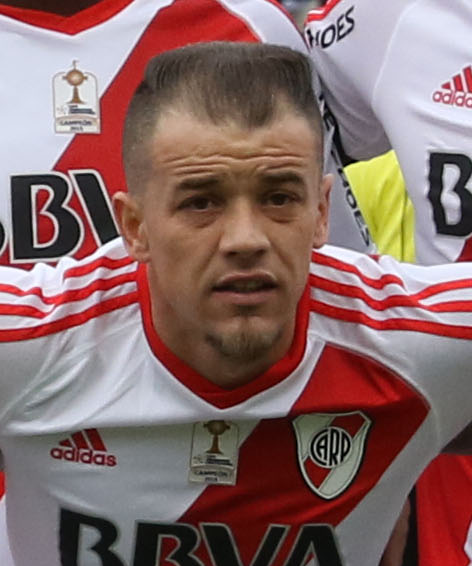
- D'Alessandro in 2016

Personal information
- Full name: Andrés Nicolás D'Alessandro
- Date of birth: 15 April 1981 (age 45)
- Place of birth: Buenos Aires, Argentina
- Height: 1.74 m (5 ft 9 in)
- Position: Attacking midfielder

Youth career
- 1991–1999: River Plate

Senior career*
Years	Team	Apps	(Gls)
2000–2003	River Plate	70	(20)
2003–2007	Wolfsburg	61	(8)
2006	→ Portsmouth (loan)	13	(1)
2006–2007	→ Zaragoza (loan)	36	(2)
2007	Zaragoza	14	(2)
2008	San Lorenzo	15	(2)
2008–2020	Internacional	284	(45)
2016	→ River Plate (loan)	17	(2)
2021	Nacional	24	(1)
2022	Internacional	1	(1)
Total		488	(84)

International career
2001	Argentina U20	7	(2)
2004	Argentina U23	6	(1)
2003–2010	Argentina	25	(3)
Medal record
Men's football
Representing Argentina
Olympic Games
Gold medal – first place	2004 Athens	Team
FIFA U-20 World Cup
Winner	2001 Argentina	Team
Copa América
Runner-up	2004 Peru
- * Club domestic league appearances and goals

Andrés Nicolás D'Alessandro (born 15 April 1981) is an Argentine former professional footballer who played as an attacking midfielder. Known as El Cabezón ("Big Head") for how large his big head looks on his small frame rather than any ego connotations, he won an Olympic gold medal with Argentina in 2004 and also played at that year's Copa América.

In 2020, he was awarded Brazilian citizenship.

D'Alessandro is regarded as one of Internacional's most notable players, alongside figures such as Falcão, Valdomiro, and Fernandão.

== Club career ==
=== Early career ===
D'Alessandro was born in the La Paternal section of Buenos Aires, Argentina. He joined the labor force as a pizza delivery boy before becoming a professional footballer. He emerged through the River Plate youth system that has produced much of Argentina's top talent over the years. He followed the likes of Santiago Solari and Pablo Aimar through the ranks, together with Javier Saviola, with whom he shared the limelight in the 2001 Youth World Championship.

His talent attracted attention from European clubs following his success and performances at the 2001 FIFA World Youth Championship. He subsequently spent time on trial at West Ham in 2001 but no deal was agreed, with the management considering Joe Cole too similar and fee too high.

With the River Plate senior team, he won the 2001–02 and 2002–03 Primera División; the 2002–03 season was one of his best, scoring 15 goals in 40 appearances.

His 15 goals included several memorable performances, most notably River Plate's 5–2 victory over Rosario Central on 29 September 2002, when he scored twice and provided two assists. He also delivered an outstanding display on 8 June 2003, scoring once and grabbing two more assists in a 4–0 win against San Lorenzo.

In the 2003 Libertadores, he scored 4 goals, including a free kick in the round of 16 1st leg against Corinthians to help his team win the match 2–1.

=== Spell in Europe ===
Following continuing impressive performances, D'Alessandro eventually transferred to German Bundesliga club Wolfsburg in July 2003 for a club record €9 million. On 21 September 2005, D'Alessandro scored the Bundesliga's 40,000th goal since its creation in 1963, netting the fourth goal in a 4–2 victory over Hannover 96.

On 31 January 2006, to the surprise of most fans, D'Alessandro joined English Premier League club Portsmouth on loan for the remainder of the season. His main objective with his new club was to blend in with new teammates and help his club to avoid relegation. On Easter Monday, 17 April, he scored his first goal in English football – a contender for goal of the season – in Portsmouth's 2–1 defeat away to Charlton Athletic.

Portsmouth survived and manager Harry Redknapp sought to sign D'Alessandro on a permanent basis, but on 17 June 2006, he completed a season-long loan switch to La Liga outfit Real Zaragoza, citing his desire to play in Spain as a major factor in his decision. His club had a great season, finishing sixth in the league, qualifying for next years UEFA Cup, and narrowly being eliminated from the Copa del Rey quarter-finals to Barcelona on away goals. On 6 June 2007, he signed a contract at Zaragoza, keeping him at the club until 2011. However he suffered disciplinary problems in his second year at the club; he was involved in a heated altercation with teammate Pablo Aimar in training on 17 October 2007, and later stated that he felt coach Víctor Fernández was giving Aimar preferential treatment.

=== Return to South America ===
In 2008, despite expressing his desire to join River Plate, the club and the player were unable to come to an agreement. Shortly after, he joined his former River Plate manager Ramón Díaz at Argentine club San Lorenzo. Despite his short spell at the club, he became one of their most important players. One of his most memorable performances came on 8 May, in the second leg of the Copa Libertadores round of 16 match against River Plate; with San Lorenzo down 2–0 at the 60th minute, D'Alessandro was involved in both of his team's goals as they scored twice in 5 minutes to win 4–3 on aggregate. Shortly after the match, D'alessandro told reporters, "This victory is special because of the people directing the club, who made a mistake." He said this because of the failed attempt to return to River after leaving Wolfsburg.

However, after Díaz left the club, D'Alesandro opted to move to Brazil to play for Internacional and joined on 1 August 2008.

On 13 December 2008 it was reported on ESPN Deportes that the Los Angeles Galaxy had made a $10 million offer to for D'Alessandro but was declined.

He played an important role in Inter's 2008 Copa Sudamericana title, scoring 2 goals in the semifinal second leg against Chivas. In 2009 Internacional finished in second place in both the Brasileirão and Copa do Brasil. In 2010, D'Alessandro led Internacional to their second Libertadores Championship, and was elected the best player in South America for that year; in the 2010 FIFA Club World Cup, he also helped Internacional to a third-place finish, and was awarded the Bronze Ball as the tournament's third best player. In 2011 D'Alessadro had personally an even better year, but Internacional only managed to win the State Championship. 2012 was a bad year for both Internacional and D'Alessandro. Furthermore, rumours of him leaving to play in China caused a major distraction; after long drawn out drama he stayed but soon was injured. In 2013 his game improved again, and while Inter only won the State Championship, he was praised as the only positive factor of the team that year. 2014 started well; D'Alessandro continued to play well and led Inter to their 4th straight Gaucho Championship.

On 3 February 2016, he returned to River Plate after 12 1/2 years on a loan deal. He won his second Recopa Sudamericana and the Copa Argentina during his stay at the club. After that, he returned to Internacional de Porto Alegre for the 2017 season.

He scored in his last match as a professional, a 2–1 victory for Inter on 16 April 2022.

== International career ==
D'Alessandro won the 2001 Under-20 World Championship with the Argentine youth side, held in Buenos Aires; due to his performances alongside his club teammate Javier Saviola, he was awarded the Silver Ball as the tournament's second best player. D'Alessandro had originally started the tournament as a substitute, but injuries allowed him a place in the team in later matches. Argentina beat Ghana 3–0 in the final.

D'Alessandro has represented Argentina's senior side on 28 occasions, scoring 4 times between 2001 and 2011. He also represented Argentina's under-23 side at the 2004 Olympic Games in Athens, where Argentina won a gold medal.

D'Alessandro also took part in the 2004 Copa América with Argentina. He scored his only goal of the tournament in the group stage, in Argentina's 6–1 victory over Ecuador In the final, against rivals Brazil, he missed Argentina's first penalty in the resulting shootout, following a 2–2 draw after extra time; Argentina were defeated 4–2 in the shootout.

On 20 August 2010, Sergio Batista recalled D'Alessandro to the national team for a friendly against Spain, which was played on 7 September 2010 at the Monumental Stadium River Plate.

== Style of play ==
D'Alessandro was best known for his dribbling ability, creativity, and technical skill, and was adept at beating players with body feints and tricks, such as the dragback (boba), nutmeg, or the Blomqvist shuffle; and was also an accurate free-kick taker. D'Alessandro is also known for his short passing ability, which makes him a capable assist provider.

In 2001, he was named one of the 100 best young footballers in the world by Don Balón, and he was also labelled one of Maradona's potential heirs by the media and by Maradona himself; despite his precocious talent however, he was not able to fully fulfill the potential he demonstrated in his youth.

== Career statistics ==
=== Club ===
Appearances and goals by club, season and competition
Club	Season	League		Cup		Continental		Other		Total	
Club	Season	Apps	Goals	Apps	Goals	Apps	Goals	Apps	Goals	Apps	Goals
River Plate	1999–2000	1	0	—		0	0	—		1	0
River Plate	2000–01	4	0	—		3	0	—		7	0
River Plate	2001–02	36	9	—		5	0	—		41	9
River Plate	2002–03	29	11	—		11	4	—		40	15
River Plate	Total	70	20	0	0	19	4	0	0	89	24
VfL Wolfsburg	2003–04	29	3	1	1	4	0	—		34	4
VfL Wolfsburg	2004–05	19	3	0	0	—		—		19	3
VfL Wolfsburg	2005–06	13	2	2	0	3	1	—		18	3
VfL Wolfsburg	Total	61	8	3	1	7	1	0	0	71	10
Portsmouth (loan)	2005–06	13	1	—		—		—		13	1
Real Zaragoza (loan)	2006–07	36	2	5	2	—		—		41	4
Real Zaragoza	2007–08	14	2	3	0	2	0	—		19	2
San Lorenzo	2007–08	15	2	—		9	0	—		24	2
Internacional	2008	11	2	—		7	2	—		18	4
Internacional	2009	22	6	7	1	3	0	9	4	41	11
Internacional	2010	20	1	—		13	10	11	4	44	5
Internacional	2011	30	9	—		8	1	10	5	48	15
Internacional	2012	21	1	—		5	1	7	1	33	3
Internacional	2013	35	11	7	4	0	0	16	5	58	20
Internacional	2014	33	6	3	0	0	0	10	2	46	8
Internacional	2015	15	0	2	0	11	4	8	1	36	5
Internacional	2016	1	0	—		—		1	0	2	0
Internacional	2017	31	5	7	2	—		14	1	52	8
Internacional	2018	24	3	6	2	—		7	2	37	7
Internacional	2019	23	1	6	0	10	0	7	0	46	1
Internacional	2020	20	0	0	0	0	0	7	2	27	2
Internacional	Total	285	45	32	9	57	8	110	28	490	90
River Plate (loan)	2016–17	17	2	4	0	9	3	—		30	5
Nacional	2021	24	1	—		5	0	1	0	30	1
Career total		535	83	53	12	108	16	111	28	807	139

=== International ===
Appearances and goals by national team and year
National team	Year	Apps	Goals
Argentina	2003	9	2
Argentina	2004	10	1
Argentina	2005	3	0
Argentina	2006	0	0
Argentina	2007	0	0
Argentina	2008	0	0
Argentina	2009	0	0
Argentina	2010	3	0
Total		25	3

Scores and results list Argentina's goal tally first, score column indicates score after each D'Alessandro goal.

List of international goals scored by Andrés D'Alessandro
No.	Date	Venue	Opponent	Score	Result	Competition	Ref.
1	20 August 2003	Stadio Artemio Franchi, Florence, Italy	Uruguay	3–2	3–2	Friendly	
2	15 November 2003	Estadio Monumental, Buenos Aires, Argentina	Bolivia	1–0	3–0	2006 FIFA World Cup qualification	
3	7 July 2004	Estadio Elías Aguirre, Chiclayo, Peru	Ecuador	5–1	6–1	2004 Copa América	

== Honours ==
River Plate

- Argentine Primera División: 2000 Clausura, 2002 Clausura, 2003 Clausura
- Recopa Sudamericana: 2016
- Copa Argentina: 2015–16

Internacional

- Copa Sudamericana: 2008
- Campeonato Gaúcho: 2009, 2011, 2012, 2013, 2014, 2015
- Copa Libertadores: 2010
- Recopa Sudamericana: 2011

Nacional

- Supercopa Uruguaya: 2021

Argentina U20

- FIFA World Youth Championship: 2001

Argentina Olympic

- Summer Olympics Gold Medal: 2004

Argentina

- Copa América runner-up: 2004

Individual

- South American Team of the Year: 2001, 2002, 2008, 2010
- FIFA World Youth Championship Silver Ball: 2001
- FIFA Club World Cup Bronze Ball: 2010
- South American Footballer of the Year: 2010
- EFE Brazil Trophy: 2013
