= Gustavo Nery =

Brazilian footballer (born 1977)

Personal information
- Full name: Gustavo Nery de Sá da Silva
- Date of birth: 22 July 1977 (age 49)
- Place of birth: Nova Friburgo, Brazil
- Height: 1.82 m (6 ft 0 in)
- Position: Left-back

Senior career*
Years	Team	Apps	(Gls)
1995–1997	Santos	8	(1)
1997	Coritiba	0	(0)
1998–1999	Santos	26	(2)
2000	Guarani		
2000–2004	São Paulo	89	(10)
2004–2005	Werder Bremen	3	(0)
2005	→ Corinthians (loan)		
2005–2007	Corinthians	65	(9)
2007	→ Zaragoza (loan)	4	(0)
2008	Fluminense	4	(0)
2008–2009	Internacional	15	(1)
2009	→ Santo André (loan)	7	(0)
2009–2010	Santo André	20	(1)
2012	São Bernardo	0	(0)

International career
2001–2005	Brazil	9	(0)
- * Club domestic league appearances and goals

Gustavo Nery de Sá da Silva (born 22 July 1977) is a Brazilian former professional footballer who played as a left-back.

== Career ==
In February 2004, it was announced Nery would join Bundesliga club Werder Bremen on a four-year contract from São Paulo in the summer. The transfer fee to be paid to São Paulo was reported as €500,000 or €600,000. He missed the beginning of training in the summer due to being called up to the Brazil national team. He was later kept out of action by a hand injury. In his time at Werder Bremen he was often injured and unable to secure a first-team spot, making three league appearances, two of which were substitute appearances.

Nery left Werder Bremen to join Corinthians on loan in February 2005. Corinthians also received an option to sign Nery permanently for a reported transfer fee of about €1.5 million.

Nery joined La Liga side Zaragoza on loan from Corinthians for the second half of the 2006–07 season.

== Honours ==
Corinthians

- Campeonato Brasileiro Série A: 2005

São Paulo

- Torneio Rio-São Paulo: 2001
- Supercampeonato Paulista: 2002

Internacional

- Copa Sudamericana: 2008

Brazil

- Copa América: 2004

Individual

- Campeonato Brasileiro Série A Team of the Year: 2005
