= Ricardo González (footballer, born 1974) =

Costa Rican footballer

Personal information
- Full name: Ricardo Alonso González Fonseca
- Date of birth: 6 March 1974 (age 52)
- Place of birth: San José, Costa Rica
- Height: 1.82 m (6 ft 0 in)
- Position: Goalkeeper

Senior career*
Years	Team	Apps	(Gls)
1994–1995	Sagrada Familia		
1995–1996	Carmelita		
1996–2005	Alajuelense	173	(0)
2005–2006	Comunicaciones	31	(0)
2006–2007	Alajuelense	5	(0)
2007–2011	Herediano	74	(0)
2011–2013	Uruguay de Coronado	48	(0)
2014–	Belén FC	17	(0)

International career^{‡}
1995–2009	Costa Rica	44	(0)
- * Club domestic league appearances and goals as of 26 July 2014 ‡ National team caps and goals as of October 16, 2009

Ricardo Alonso González Fonseca (born 6 March 1974) is a Costa Rican former professional football goalkeeper who last played for Belén in the Primera División de Costa Rica.

== Club career ==
Nicknamed el Gallinazo, González was relegated with Sagrada Familia after the 1994–95 season and then played for Carmelita and Alajuelense for whom he kept a record successive clean sheets, totalling 758 minutes in the 2002 season. He played 178 league games for Liga. He moved abroad to play alongside compatriot Rolando Fonseca for Comunicaciones of Guatemala in summer 2005 before joining Herediano in 2007.

He was lured away to join coach Paulo Wanchope at second division Uruguay de Coronado ahead of the 2011 Verano season. He moved to Belén ahead of the 2014 Verano season.

== International career ==
González made his debut for Costa Rica in a friendly against Jamaica on September 27, 1995 and has made 44 appearances for the Costa Rica national football team, including three qualifying matches for the 2006 FIFA World Cup and five qualifying matches for the 2010 FIFA World Cup.

González made one appearance at the Copa América 2001 and four appearances at the Copa América 2004 He also made four appearances at the 2003 CONCACAF Gold Cup and two at the 2009 CONCACAF Gold Cup.

His final international was a September 2009 FIFA World Cup qualification match against El Salvador.

== Personal life ==
He is married to Hazel Houdelath and they have four children: Karolina, Gabriel, Fabianna and Ivana.
