= Try Bennett =

Costa Rican footballer (born 1975)

Personal information
- Full name: Try Anthony Bennett Grant
- Date of birth: 5 August 1975 (age 51)
- Place of birth: Costa Rica
- Height: 1.74 m (5 ft 9 in)
- Position: Defender

Youth career
- 1987–1993: Saprissa

Senior career*
| Years | Team | Apps | (Gls) |
| 1993–1997 | Saprissa | | |
| 1997–1998 | Comunicaciones | | |
| 1998–2000 | USAC | | |
| 2000–2003 | Herediano | 65 | (4) |
| 2003–2008 | Saprissa | 115 | (5) |

International career^{‡}
| 2002–2007 | Costa Rica | 24 | (1) |

Managerial career
- 2011: UNED
- * Club domestic league appearances and goals ‡ National team caps and goals as of 1 January 2014

Try Anthony Bennett Grant (born 5 August 1975) is a Costa Rican former footballer.

== Club career ==
Bennett made his professional debut for Saprissa on 3 October 1993 against Puntarenas and played the majority of his career for Saprissa. He had brief stints abroad with Guatemalan sides Comunicaciones and USAC.

He also played for Herediano and finished his career at Brujas whom he joined in summer 2008.

With Saprissa, he has won four national championships and two CONCACAF Champions Cup, and was part of the team that played the 2005 FIFA Club World Championship, where Saprissa finished third behind São Paulo Futebol Clube and Liverpool F.C.

=== Doping conviction and retirement ===
In February 2010, Bennett was suspended for two months after he tested positive of dexamethasone in a doping test after the December 2009 championship play-off against Puntarenas.

He retired in March 2010 and a year later took the reins at third division side UNED.

== International career ==
Bennett played in the 1995 FIFA World Youth Championship held in Qatar.

He made his senior debut for Costa Rica in an October 2002 friendly match against Ecuador and has earned a total of 24 caps, scoring 1 goal. He has represented his country in 3 FIFA World Cup qualification matches and played at the 2003 and 2007 UNCAF Nations Cups as well as at the 2003 CONCACAF Gold Cup and the 2004 Copa América.

His final international was a February 2007 UNCAF Nations Cup match against El Salvador.

=== International goals ===
Scores and results list Costa Rica's goal tally first.

| N. | Date | Venue | Opponent | Score | Result | Competition |
|---|---|---|---|---|---|---|
| 1. | 29 March 2003 | Estadio Alejandro Morera Soto, Alajuela, Costa Rica | Paraguay | 2–1 | 2–1 | Friendly match |

== Personal life ==
He is the uncle of professional footballer Jewison Bennette. His brother Jéwisson Bennett also played for the national team.
