= Jorge Luis Pinto =

Colombian football manager (born 1952)

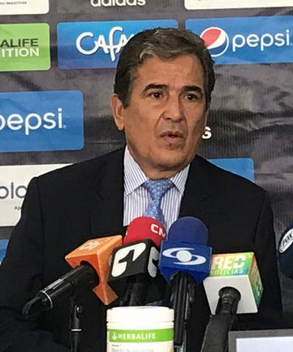
- Pinto in 2019

Personal information
- Full name: Jorge Luis Pinto Afanador
- Date of birth: 16 December 1952 (age 73)
- Place of birth: San Gil, Colombia
- Height: 1.65 m (5 ft 5 in)

Managerial career
- Years: Team
- 1984–1985: Millonarios
- 1986–1987: Santa Fe
- 1988–1989: Unión Magdalena
- 1990–1991: Deportivo Cali
- 1991–1993: Santa Fe
- 1994–1997: Unión Magdalena
- 1997–1998: Alianza Lima
- 1998–1999: Millonarios
- 1999–2000: Alianza Lima
- 2001: Atlético Bucaramanga
- 2002–2003: Alajuelense
- 2003–2004: Atlético Junior
- 2004–2005: Costa Rica
- 2006: Cúcuta Deportivo
- 2007–2008: Colombia
- 2009: Cúcuta Deportivo
- 2010: El Nacional
- 2010–2011: Deportivo Táchira
- 2011: Atlético Junior
- 2011–2014: Costa Rica
- 2016: Honduras Olympic
- 2014–2017: Honduras
- 2018–2019: Millonarios
- 2020: United Arab Emirates
- 2022–2023: Deportivo Cali
- 2024–2025: Unión Magdalena

Jorge Luis Pinto Afanador (born 16 December 1952) is a Colombian football manager.

== Managing career ==
Pinto managed several teams in Colombia, including Santa Fe and Unión Magdalena on two occasions, before joining Club Alianza Lima (Peru) in 1997. The team was able to win the 1997 Torneo Descentralizado, after an 18-year drought. Afterwards, he left the club and returned to Colombia.

After an unsuccessful attempt at coaching Costa Rica in 2004–2005, Pinto returned to Colombia to coach Cúcuta Deportivo, leading them to their first Colombian league title.

Pinto was named as the new coach of the Colombia national team in December 2006. His tenure began positively, as Colombia enjoyed a strong start in the World Cup qualifiers, earning 10 out of 16 possible points—including a memorable 2-1 victory over Argentina. However, he faced criticism after poor results in the 2007 Copa América, where Colombia suffered a heavy 5-0 loss to Paraguay. After a 1-0 loss to Uruguay at home and a 4-0 away loss to Chile, and with the team sixth in the table, Pinto was sacked by the FCF in September 2008.

In November 2008, he returned to Cucuta Deportivo. He left at the end of the 2009 Finalizacion with the team missing out of playoff qualification.

In 2010, he became coach of Deportivo Táchira and won the Venezuelan championship with the club in 2011. He exited the club in June 2011, shortly after winning the title.

In 2011, he became manager of Costa Rica again, and on 10 September 2013 qualified for the 2014 FIFA World Cup in Brazil. Costa Rica ended in second place in 2014 World Cup qualification.

In the 2014 FIFA World Cup, Pinto secured a 3–1 victory for Costa Rica over Uruguay and another 1–0 victory over Italy. After a 0–0 draw against England, Costa Rica finished first in what many called the "Group of Death", the second time Costa Rica made it to the World Cup Round of 16. On 29 June 2014, Costa Rica defeated Greece on penalties and went through to the quarter finals of the 2014 World Cup. His team eventually lost on penalties to the Netherlands after a goalless draw. Shortly after Costa Rica's elimination, Pinto stepped down as coach, citing "differences" with the Costa Rican Football Federation. He was voted as CONCACAF's best coach of 2014, beating United States head coach Jürgen Klinsmann.

In December 2014, he became manager of the Honduras. Pinto took his team into the two leg intercontinental playoff against Australia for a place at the 2018 FIFA World Cup in Russia. However, Honduras lost to Australia 3–1 on aggregate over the two legs and Pinto later stepped down as Honduras coach.

In July 2018, he was on a 4-man shortlist for the vacant Egyptian national team manager job. In November 2018, he returned to Colombia to coach Millonarios, until October 2019.

In July 2020, he became the head coach of the United Arab Emirates national team. On 30 November 2020, Pinto's contract was terminated due to disappointing results with the national team.

On 1 October 2022, he returned to Deportivo Cali for a second spell as manager, having previously been at the helm of the Colombian club from 1990 to 1991. Pinto managed Deportivo Cali for nine months, resigning on 8 July 2023.

== Managerial statistics ==
As of 15 November 2016

Team	From	To	Record								
Team	From	To	M	W	D	L	GF	GA	GD	Win %	Ref.
Costa Rica	20 September 2011	24 July 2014	49	23	13	13	63	43	+20	46.94	
Honduras	6 December 2014	15 November 2017	30	11	7	12	41	33	+8	36.67	

== Honours ==
Alianza Lima

- Peruvian Primera División: 1997, 1999 Clausura

Alajuelense

- Costa Rican Primera División: 2002 Apertura, 2003 Apertura, 2003 Clausura

Costa Rica

- Copa Centroamericana: 2005, 2013

Cúcuta Deportivo

- Categoría Primera A: 2006

Deportivo Táchira

- Venezuelan Primera División: 2010–11

Honduras

- Copa Centroamericana: 2017

=== Individual ===
- CONCACAF's 2014 coach of the year
- Best Colombian coach of 2014

== See also ==
- List of football managers with the most matches
