= Alexander Castro =

Costa Rican footballer (born 1979)

Alexánder Castro
Personal information
- Full name: Alexánder Castro Trejos
- Date of birth: February 14, 1979 (age 47)
- Place of birth: Golfito, Costa Rica
- Height: 1.74 m (5 ft 9 in)
- Position: Right back

Senior career*
Years	Team	Apps	(Gls)
1999–2005	Alajuelense	96	(3)
2005–2007	Cartaginés	52	(1)
2007–2009	Herediano	13	(2)
2009–2010	Ramonense	18	(1)
2010–2011	Herediano	7	(0)

International career^{‡}
2001–2005	Costa Rica	22	(0)
- * Club domestic league appearances and goals as of December 2011 ‡ National team caps and goals as of December 2009

Alexánder Castro Trejos (born February 14, 1979) is a retired Costa Rican professional footballer.

== Club career ==
Castro made his league debut for Alajuelense on 7 February 1999 against Municipal Goicoechea, also immediately scoring a goal in the match, and played for Herediano, whom he joined for a second spell in August 2010, Cartaginés and Ramonense in the Primera División de Costa Rica.

In December 2011, Castro began legal proceedings against Herediano, claiming the club owed him money after they did not honor his contract until 2013.

== International career ==
Castro played for Costa Rica at the 1999 FIFA World Youth Championship in Nigeria.

Castro made 23 appearances for the Costa Rica national football team, including two qualifying matches for the 2006 FIFA World Cup. He made his debut in a UNCAF Nations Cup 2001 match against Belize on June 23, 2001. He made two appearances for Costa Rica at the Copa América 2004 and five appearances at the 2003 CONCACAF Gold Cup.

His final international was a February 2005 UNCAF Nations Cup match against El Salvador.
