= Omar Briceño =

Mexican footballer (born 1978)

Personal information
- Full name: Gabriel Omar Briceño Leyva
- Date of birth: 30 January 1978 (age 48)
- Place of birth: Culiacán, Sinaloa, Mexico
- Height: 1.73 m (5 ft 8 in)
- Position: Defender

Senior career*
Years	Team	Apps	(Gls)
1996–2002	Atlas	137	(7)
2002–2007	Tigres UANL	135	(1)
2007–2008	Veracruz	28	(0)
2008–2009	Puebla	11	(0)
2009–2011	Dorados de Sinaloa	37	(0)

International career^{‡}
2003–2005	Mexico	20	(0)

Managerial career
- 2013: Generales de Navojoa
- 2013: Vaqueros
- 2014: Deportivo Ensenada
- 2015: Dorados de Sinaloa Premier
- 2015: Dorados de Sinaloa (Interim)
- 2015: Dorados de Sinaloa Reserves and Academy (Assistant)
- 2016: Dorados de Sinaloa Premier
- 2018: Reboceros de La Piedad
- 2019: Reboceros de La Piedad (Assistant)
- 2019–2020: CAFESSA TDP
- 2020–2021: CAFESSA Jalisco
- * Club domestic league appearances and goals as of 24 July 2020 ‡ National team caps and goals as of 24 July 2020

Gabriel Omar Briceño Leyva (born 30 January 1978) is a Mexican former footballer, who last played for Dorados de Sinaloa in Liga de Ascenso.

== Club career ==
He debuted with Club Atlas in 1997, and played with them until 2002, when he moved to Tigres UANL. In 2007, he left Tigres, and had short spells with Veracruz and Puebla FC before joining Dorados in January 2009.

== International career ==
Briceno was capped on 19 occasions by the Mexico national team between 2003 and 2006.

== Managerial statistics ==
=== Managerial statistics ===
As of 31 May 1801

Team	Nat	From	To	Record							
Team	Nat	From	To	G	W	D	L	GF	GA	GD	Win %
Cruz Azul (Interim)	(Mexico)	2015	2015	1	0	1	0	1	1	+0	0.00
Total				1	0	1	0	1	1	+0	0.00
