= List of flag bearers for Paraguay at the Olympics =

Paraguay at the Olympics
- IOC code: PAR
- NOC: Comité Olímpico Paraguayo
- Website: www.cop.org.py (in Spanish)
- Medals: Gold 0 Silver 1 Bronze 0 Total 1

Summer appearances
- 1968; 1972; 1976; 1980; 1984; 1988; 1992; 1996; 2000; 2004; 2008; 2012; 2016; 2020; 2024

Winter appearances
- 2014; 2018–2026

This is a list of flag bearers who have represented Paraguay at the Olympics.

Flag bearers carry the national flag of their country at the opening ceremony of the Olympic Games.

#	Event year	Season	Flag bearer	Sport
1	1968	Summer	Rodolfo da Ponte	Swimming
2	1972	Summer	Arnulfo Ruben Becker	Manager
3	1976	Summer	Julio Abreu	Swimming
4	1984	Summer	Max Narváez	Judo
5	1988	Summer	Ramón Jiménez-Gaona	Athletics
6	1992	Summer	Ramón Jiménez-Gaona	Athletics
7	1996	Summer	Ramón Jiménez-Gaona	Athletics
8	2000	Summer	Nery Kennedy	Athletics
9	2004	Summer	Rocio Rivarola	Rowing
10	2008	Summer	Víctor Fatecha	Athletics
11	2012	Summer	Benjamin Hockin	Swimming
12	2014	Winter	Julia Marino	Freestyle skiing
13	2016	Summer	Julieta Granada	Golf
14	2020	Summer	Verónica Cepede Royg	Tennis
14	2020	Summer	Fabrizio Zanotti	Golf
15	2024	Summer	Alejandra Alonso	Rowing
15	2024	Summer	Fabrizio Zanotti	Golf

== See also ==
- Paraguay at the Olympics
