= Paraguay at the Olympics =

- IOC code: PAR
- NOC: Comité Olímpico Paraguayo
- Website: www.cop.org.py (in Spanish)
- Medals Ranked 137th: Gold 0 Silver 1 Bronze 0 Total 1

Summer appearances
- 1968; 1972; 1976; 1980; 1984; 1988; 1992; 1996; 2000; 2004; 2008; 2012; 2016; 2020; 2024; 2028

Winter appearances
- 2014; 2018–2026

Paraguay first competed in the 1968 Olympic Games which was held in Mexico City, Mexico, and has sent athletes to compete in every Summer Olympic Games since then, except when they boycotted the 1980 Summer Olympics in Moscow. The nation competed in the Winter Olympic Games for the first time (as for 2026 the only time) in 2014, which were held in Sochi, Russia.

The nation has only ever won one medal, the silver in the men's football in 2004, where they lost 1-0 to Argentina in the final in Athens.

== Medal tables ==
=== Medals by Summer Games ===
| Games | Athletes | Gold | Silver | Bronze | Total | Rank |
| 1968 Mexico City | 1 | 0 | 0 | 0 | 0 | – |
| (West Germany) 1972 Munich | 3 | 0 | 0 | 0 | 0 | – |
| (Canada) 1976 Montreal | 4 | 0 | 0 | 0 | 0 | – |
| (Soviet Union) 1980 Moscow | boycotted | | | | | |
| (United States) 1984 Los Angeles | 14 | 0 | 0 | 0 | 0 | – |
| (South Korea) 1988 Seoul | 10 | 0 | 0 | 0 | 0 | – |
| (Spain) 1992 Barcelona | 27 | 0 | 0 | 0 | 0 | – |
| (United States) 1996 Atlanta | 7 | 0 | 0 | 0 | 0 | – |
| (Australia) 2000 Sydney | 5 | 0 | 0 | 0 | 0 | – |
| (Greece) 2004 Athens | 23 | 0 | 1 | 0 | 1 | 65 |
| (China) 2008 Beijing | 6 | 0 | 0 | 0 | 0 | – |
| (United Kingdom) 2012 London | 8 | 0 | 0 | 0 | 0 | – |
| (Brazil) 2016 Rio de Janeiro | 11 | 0 | 0 | 0 | 0 | – |
| (Japan) 2020 Tokyo | 8 | 0 | 0 | 0 | 0 | – |
| (France) 2024 Paris | 28 | 0 | 0 | 0 | 0 | – |
| (United States) 2028 Los Angeles | future event | | | | | |
| (Australia) 2032 Brisbane | future event | | | | | |
| Total | | 0 | 1 | 0 | 1 | 137 |

=== Medals by Winter Games ===
| Games | Athletes | Gold | Silver | Bronze | Total | Rank |
| (Russia) 2014 Sochi | 1 | 0 | 0 | 0 | 0 | – |
| (South Korea) 2018 Pyeongchang | did not participate | | | | | |
| (China) 2022 Beijing | did not participate | | | | | |
| (Italy) 2026 Milano Cortina | did not participate | | | | | |
| (France) 2030 French Alps | future event | | | | | |
| (United States) 2034 Utah | future event | | | | | |
| Total | | 0 | 0 | 0 | 0 | – |

=== Medals by summer sport ===
| Sports | Gold | Silver | Bronze | Total | Rank |
|---|---|---|---|---|---|
| Football | 0 | 1 | 0 | 1 | 26 |
| Total | 0 | 1 | 0 | 1 | 132 |

== List of medalists ==
| Medal | Name | Games | Sport | Event |
|---|---|---|---|---|
| Silver | Football team: Rodrigo Romero Emilio Martínez Julio Manzur Carlos Gamarra José Devaca Celso Esquivel Pablo Giménez Edgar Barreto Fredy Barreiro Diego Figueredo Aureliano Torres Pedro Benítez Julio César Enciso Julio González Ernesto Cristaldo Osvaldo Díaz José Cardozo Diego Barreto | 2004 Athens | Football | Men's competition |

== See also ==
- List of flag bearers for Paraguay at the Olympics
- Tropical nations at the Winter Olympics
