= Paraguay at the 2000 Summer Olympics =

- IOC code: PAR
- NOC: Paraguayan Olympic Committee
- Website: www.cop.org.py (in Spanish)

in Sydney
- Competitors: 5 (2 men and 3 women) in 3 sports
- Flag bearer: Nery Kennedy
- Medals: Gold 0 Silver 0 Bronze 0 Total 0

Summer Olympics appearances (overview)
- 1968; 1972; 1976; 1980; 1984; 1988; 1992; 1996; 2000; 2004; 2008; 2012; 2016; 2020; 2024

Paraguay was represented at the 2000 Summer Olympics in Sydney, New South Wales, Australia by the Paraguayan Olympic Committee.

In total, five athletes including two men and three women represented Paraguay in three different sports including athletics, swimming and tennis.

== Background ==
Paraguay made their Olympic debut at the 1968 Summer Olympics in Mexico City, Mexico. The 2000 Summer Olympics in Sydney, New South Wales, Australia marked their eighth appearance at the Olympics.

== Summary ==
Paraguay participated at the 2000 Summer Olympics in Sydney. Tennis player Rossana de los Ríos took part in the Women's Singles Competition, defeating Květa Peschke (6–3, 6–0) in the first round and Lindsay Davenport due to a walk-over in the second round. She then faced Jelena Dokić who eventually defeated her in the third round (7–6, 7–5). In Athletics, Nery Kennedy participated in Men's Javelin Throw and Mariana Canillas participated in Women's Discus. In the Swimming events, Antonio Leon Candia took part in the Men's 100 metre Breaststroke and Andrea Prono in the Women's 100 metre Backstroke.

== Competitors ==
In total, five athletes represented Paraguay at the 2000 Summer Olympics in Sydney, New South Wales, Australia across three different sports.

Sport	Men	Women	Total
Athletics	1	1	2
Swimming	1	1	2
Tennis	0	1	1
Total	2	3	5

== Athletics ==
In total, two Paraguayan athletes participated in the athletics events – Mariana Canillas in the women's discus throw and Nery Kennedy in the men's javelin throw.

Athlete	Event	Qualification		Final	
Athlete	Event	Distance	Position	Distance	Position
Nery Kennedy	Men's javelin throw	70.26	33	did not advance	
Mariana Canillas	Women's discus throw	32.31	32	did not advance	

== Swimming ==
In total, two Paraguayan athletes participated in the swimming events – Antonio Leon in the men's 100 m breaststroke and Andrea Prono in the women's 100 m breaststroke.

Athlete	Event	Heat		Semifinals		Final	
Athlete	Event	Time	Rank	Time	Rank	Time	Rank
Antonio Leon	Men's 100 m breaststroke	1:08.12 NR	61	did not advance			
Andrea Prono	Women's 100 m backstroke	1:08.11	45	did not advance			

== Tennis ==
In total, one Paraguayan athlete participated in the tennis events – Rossana de los Ríos in the women's singles.

Athlete	Event	First Round	Second Round	Third Round	Quarterfinals	Semifinals	Final / Bronze match	
Athlete	Event	Opposition Score	Opposition Score	Opposition Score	Opposition Score	Opposition Score	Opposition Score	Rank
Rossana de los Ríos	Women's singles	Peschke (CZE); W 6–3, 6–0	Davenport (USA); W Walkover	Dokic (AUS); L 6–7, 5–7	did not advance			9T

== See also ==
- Paraguay at the 1999 Pan American Games
