= Rodolfo da Ponte =

Paraguayan fencer (1938–2021)

Personal information
- Full name: Rodolfo Alfredo da Ponte Samudio
- Born: 26 November 1938 Asunción, Paraguay
- Died: 6 April 2021 (aged 82) Asunción, Paraguay

Sport
- Sport: Fencing

Rodolfo Alfredo da Ponte Samudio (26 November 1938 – 6 April 2021) was a Paraguayan fencer. Coming from a family of fencers, he was taught fencing by his grandfather. For his career, he won gold in the team sabre event at the South American Fencing Championships and was selected to compete for Paraguay at the 1968 Summer Olympics, becoming the first Paraguayan Olympian. His son, Enzo da Ponte, competed at the 1992 Summer Olympics.

== Early life ==
Rodolfo Alfredo da Ponte Samudio was born on 26 November 1938 in Asunción, Paraguay. da Ponte is of Italian heritage and comes from a family of fencers. His grandfather was a fencing instructor in Italy and taught him how to fence, while his father Rodolfo Ítalo Da Ponte coached him.

== Career and later life ==
He competed in the South American Fencing Championships and won in the team sabre event. Initially, the national rowing team and the football team were expected to compete for Paraguay at the 1968 Summer Olympics for their first appearance, though the former resigned and the latter failed to qualify for the Summer Games. This led the National Sports Council to select da Ponte at the last possible moment as the sole competitor.

In a span of two days, the organizing committee for the Summer Games invited da Ponte, providing airfare and accommodation. With the collaboration between the organizers and the council, documents were procured for him and his father to go to Mexico City to participate. At the Summer Games, he was designated as the flag bearer for the nation during the opening ceremony. He competed in the first round of the men's foil event on 15 October. Though, he lost all of his bouts and failed to advance further.

Five years after the 1968 Summer Games, he had a son named Enzo da Ponte who eventually competed for Paraguay at the 1992 Summer Olympics in Barcelona. In 2019, Rodolfo protested the resignation of the National Secretary of Sports from hosting the 2022 South American Games to be held in Asunción. In 2021, he had developed COVID-19, leading him to be hospitalised for pneumonia and eventually died from cardiac arrest on 6 April 2021 in Asunción.
