= Ho Chung Kin =

Hong Kong sports shooter

Personal information
- Native name
- Traditional Chinese: 何中堅
- Simplified Chinese: 何中坚
Transcriptions
Standard Mandarin
- Hanyu Pinyin: Hé Zhōngjiān
- Wade–Giles: Ho Chung-chien
Yue: Cantonese
- Jyutping: Ho4 Zung1 Gin1
- Nationality: Chinese
- Born: 15 March 1938 (age 87)
- Education: University of Reading
- Occupation(s): Land surveyor, assistant professor
- Employer: University of Hong Kong
- Other interests: Poetry translation
- Known for: Chinese Poetry of Tang and Song Dynasties: A New Translation; Behold All the Flowers of Chang'an in a Single Day: The Beauty of Tang Poetry in English Translation

Sport
- Sport: Sports shooting

Ho Chung Kin (traditional Chinese: 何中堅; simplified Chinese: 何中坚; born 15 March 1938) is a Hong Kong sports shooter, translator, author, and land surveyor. He competed in the men's 25 metre rapid fire pistol event at the 1984 Summer Olympics. He placed 47th at the event. Ho represented Hong Kong at numerous other international sporting competitions including the 1984 Southeast Asian Shooting Championships, 1986 Commonwealth Games, the 1990 Commonwealth Games, and the 1990 Asian Games.

Ho became a land surveyor after receiving a degree from the University of Reading. By 2012, he had become an assistant professor at the University of Hong Kong's School of Architecture. In his youth, his mother had read Chinese classics to him. Dissatisified with the English translations of Chinese poetry, Ho spent years doing his own translations which he published in two books. Released in 2012, Chinese Poetry of Tang and Song Dynasties: A New Translation translated 150 classical Chinese poems from the Tang and Song dynasties into English. His second book, Behold All the Flowers of Chang'an in a Single Day: The Beauty of Tang Poetry in English Translation (traditional Chinese: 一日看盡長安花：英譯唐詩之美; simplified Chinese: 一日看尽长安花：英译唐诗之美), was published in 2017 and translated 203 Tang dynasty poems into English.

== Early life ==
Ho was born on 15 March 1938 to Chan Sook Kai (Chinese: 陳淑佳), his mother. The South China Morning Post reported that he was born in 1940 or 1941. When he was nine years old, Ho immigrated with his family from Guangzhou to Hong Kong in 1950. In his youth, his mother, a middle school teacher, read him Chinese classics. Because his family came from modest means, he was unable to study literature, his passion, and his mother advised him to choose engineering for his university studies. Ho chose to become a land surveyor. Since Hong Kong did not have surveying classes, he enrolled in correspondence studies at England's University of Reading and graduated in six years.

== Sports career ==
A friend brought Ho to a gun club to go pistol shooting at the end of the 1970s. Ho became drawn to the sport. Prior to starting his workday, at 6:00 am each weekday, Ho trained in shooting. Every Saturday, he would spend half the day training. The South China Morning Post's Kanglei Wang said in 2012 that after a number of years Ho turned into "one of the best shots in Hong Kong". In 1981, Ho scored 586 points, winning the rapid fire pistol competition hosted by the Hong Kong Shooting Association (Chinese: 香港射擊總會) at a Kau Wah Keng shooting range. His performance set a Hong Kong record and a Southeast Asian record.

Ho competed in Los Angeles on behalf of Hong Kong in the men's 25 metre rapid fire pistol event at the 1984 Summer Olympics. To prepare for the competition, he travelled to Beijing with teammate Solomon Lee on 19 June 1984 to train for two weeks with the Chinese national team. In the initial stage of the competition, Ho ranked fourth. He did not do well in the second phase and fell to 11th place. He finished the event with a rank of 47 and a score of 560. At the 1984 Southeast Asian Shooting Championships held at the Kau Wah Keng shooting range, Ho received the individual silver medal. He had a score of 574 which matched Nathaniel Padilla's score. However, Ho placed second since he did not have as many bullseyes. In the 1985 Hongkong Shooting Championships, Ho received first place in the rapid fire event. At the following year's competition, he had a 574 score and received second place in the rapid fire event. Ho represented Hong Kong in the 1986 Commonwealth Games in the rapid fire pistol event. In the centre fire pistol pairs event, he competed with Gilbert U; they placed sixth with a score of 1,131. He competed at the 1990 Commonwealth Games in the rapid fire pistol event and placed 14th after scoring 542. On behalf of Hong Kong, he competed in Beijing at the 1990 Asian Games. In the rapid fire pistol event, he placed 22nd after scoring 272 on the first day and 275 on the second day.

== Translation career ==
By 2012, Ho was an assistant professor at the University of Hong Kong's School of Architecture and was a working surveyor. He wrote the book Chinese Poetry of Tang and Song Dynasties: A New Translation, which was issued by Commercial Press. Within several weeks of Ho submitting his manuscript to Commercial Press, the publisher had printed his book and began selling it. His book translated over 150 classical Chinese poems from the Tang and Song dynasties into English. His translations conveyed the poems' actual meaning, and maintained a rhyme structure that mirrored the original classical Chinese poems. According to Kanglei Wang, a South China Morning Post reporter, an endeavour of this scope had never been seen before. Ho spent 3.5 years writing the book. On weekdays, after eating dinner, he reviewed classical poems and went through each line to attempt to create a rhyme. On weekends, he occasionally spent the entire day on this endeavour. On occasion, he would struggle for several months to find the ideal phrase or word. Ho's motivation for writing the book was that classical Chinese poems largely have been translated into English by foreign academics who did not attempt to make the translated poems rhyme. Ho reviewed these translations and said, "Their English is fine, of course, the meaning is there. But you can't see the beauty. I'll read it, but it doesn't sound like a poem." Wang, the reporter, said, "Translation exercised all of Ho's abilities: the rational, logical surveyor and precise shooter helped give him precision when he came to language and a love of literature and art enabled him to understand allusions and the subtleties of unspoken emotion."

Ho wrote the book Behold All the Flowers of Chang'an in a Single Day: The Beauty of Tang Poetry in English Translation (traditional Chinese: 一日看盡長安花：英譯唐詩之美; simplified Chinese: 一日看尽长安花：英译唐诗之美). Published in 2017 by CITIC Press Group, the book translated into English 203 poems from the Tang dynasty. Ho spent six years working on the translations. Guangzhou Daily author Jun Sun wrote that Ho painstakingly worked to "recreate the cadence and emotional resonance of these poems in English, capturing the thoughts, sentiments, and passion of the ancient poets".

== Works ==
- Ho, C. K. 何中堅 (2012). Chinese Poetry of Tang and Song Dynasties: A New Translation. Hong Kong: Commercial Press. ISBN 978-962-07-0321-8 – via Internet Archive.
- Ho, Chung Kin 何中堅 (2017). 一日看尽长安花：英译唐诗之美 [Behold All the Flowers of Chang'an in a Single Day: The Beauty of Tang Poetry in English Translation]. Beijing: CITIC Press Group. ISBN 978-750-86638-76.
