= Online Gravity =

Non fiction by Paul X

- Author: Paul X. McCarthy
- Publisher: Simon & Schuster
- Publication date: 2015
- Media type: Print (Hardcover)
- Pages: 322
- ISBN: 9781471140853
- OCLC: 898155233
- Website: onlinegravity.com

Online Gravity is a 2015 non-fiction book written by Paul X. McCarthy, a computational social science researcher. The first edition of the book was published in 2015 by Simon & Schuster.

== History ==
Online Gravity was published in 2015 by Simon & Schuster and written by Paul X. McCarthy, who has served as a professor at the University of New South Wales (UNSW).

== Description ==
The writer of the book uses examples from business to show how a new set of economic laws that are significantly unlike from those in the physical world are in effect today due to the introduction of digital technologies to all aspects of the economy. He claims that one of the primary effects is the way it is changing the structure of business competition, industries, and ultimately the whole economy and creating "gravity giants" - massive dominant global companies who dominate in their space. He asserts that these businesses' evolution is quite similar to the effect of gravity on the formation of the Solar System emerging from a dust cloud and with many small fragments of rock into eight clear and distinct planets and notably no dual planets. Although, people cannot avoid the economic effects of technology giants, they can leverage their power for a variety of purposes including helping to rapidly expand small new firms.

== Reception ==
The book has been reviewed by multiple publications, including The Financial Express and The Hindu. Additionally, it was reviewed by a scholarly publication, Journal of Tourism Futures.

A Chinese edition of Online Gravity was published by CITIC Press (Beijing, 2018) and a Russian Edition was published by AST (Moscow, 2019).
