= Paraguay at the 2016 Summer Olympics =

- IOC code: PAR
- NOC: Comité Olímpico Paraguayo
- Website: www.cop.org.py (in Spanish)

in Rio de Janeiro
- Competitors: 11 in 7 sports
- Flag bearer: Julieta Granada
- Medals: Gold 0 Silver 0 Bronze 0 Total 0

Summer Olympics appearances (overview)
- 1968; 1972; 1976; 1980; 1984; 1988; 1992; 1996; 2000; 2004; 2008; 2012; 2016; 2020; 2024; 2028

Paraguay competed at the 2016 Summer Olympics in Rio de Janeiro, Brazil, from 5 to 21 August 2016. Since the nation's official debut in 1968, Paraguayan athletes had appeared in every edition of the Summer Olympic Games, but did not attend the 1980 Summer Olympics in Moscow because of the nation's partial support for the US-led boycott.

Paraguay Olympic Committee (Spanish: Comité Olímpico Paraguayo) confirmed a team of 11 athletes, six men and five women, to compete in seven sports at the Games. It was the nation's largest delegation sent to the Olympics without the men's football squad since 1984, and the first with a highest percentage of women in its history.

The Paraguayan roster featured five returning Olympians; two of them attended their third Games as the most experienced competitors, including table tennis player Marcelo Aguirre, and freestyle swimmer Benjamin Hockin, who represented Great Britain as a member of the relay squad on his Olympic debut in Beijing eight years earlier. Meanwhile, three other athletes competed at their maiden Olympics in London: single sculls rower Gabriela Mosqueira, Hockin's fellow swimmer Karen Riveros (women's 100 m freestyle), and tennis star Verónica Cepede Royg. World-ranked golfer Julieta Granada was selected to carry the flag for Paraguay in the opening ceremony, joining with rower Rocio Rivarola as the only females in the nation's history to accept the role.

Paraguay, however, failed to earn its first Olympic medal, since the 2004 Summer Olympics in Athens, where the men's football team took the silver.

== Athletics (track and field) ==
Paraguayan athletes have so far achieved qualifying standards in the following athletics events (up to a maximum of 3 athletes in each event):

Key

- Note–Ranks given for track events are within the athlete's heat only
- Q = Qualified for the next round
- q = Qualified for the next round as a fastest loser or, in field events, by position without achieving the qualifying target
- NR = National record
- N/A = Round not applicable for the event
- Bye = Athlete not required to compete in round

Track & road events

Athlete	Event	Final	
Athlete	Event	Result	Rank
Derlis Ayala	Men's marathon	2:39:40	136
Carmen Martínez	Women's marathon	2:56:43	115

== Golf ==
Paraguay has entered two golfers into the Olympic tournament. Fabrizio Zanotti (world no. 147) and Julieta Granada (world no. 135) qualified directly among the top 60 eligible players for their respective individual events based on the IGF World Rankings as of 11 July 2016.

Athlete	Event	Round 1	Round 2	Round 3	Round 4	Total		
Athlete	Event	Score	Score	Score	Score	Score	Par	Rank
Fabrizio Zanotti	Men's	70	74	68	67	279	−5	=15
Julieta Granada	Women's	71	69	76	78	294	+10	=44

== Rowing ==
Paraguay has qualified one boat in the women's single sculls for the Olympics at the 2016 Latin American Continental Qualification Regatta in Valparaíso.

Athlete	Event	Heats		Repechage		Quarterfinals		Semifinals		Final	
Athlete	Event	Time	Rank	Time	Rank	Time	Rank	Time	Rank	Time	Rank
Arturo Rivarola	Men's single sculls	7:29.23	3 QF	Bye		7:17.12	6 SC/D	7:41.43	6 FD	7:18.34	24
Gabriela Mosqueira	Women's single sculls	8:27.39	4 R	7:59.32	2 QF	7:54.49	5 SC/D	8:22.84	5 FD	7:44.62	19

Qualification Legend: FA=Final A (medal); FB=Final B (non-medal); FC=Final C (non-medal); FD=Final D (non-medal); FE=Final E (non-medal); FF=Final F (non-medal); SA/B=Semifinals A/B; SC/D=Semifinals C/D; SE/F=Semifinals E/F; QF=Quarterfinals; R=Repechage

== Shooting ==
Paraguay has received an invitation from the Tripartite Commission to send a men's double trap shooter to the Olympics, signifying the nation's comeback to the sport after an eight-year hiatus.

Athlete	Event	Qualification		Semifinal		Final	
Athlete	Event	Points	Rank	Points	Rank	Points	Rank
Paulo Reichardt	Men's double trap	106	22	Did not advance			

Qualification Legend: Q = Qualify for the next round; q = Qualify for the bronze medal (shotgun)

== Swimming ==
Paraguay has received a Universality invitation from FINA to send two swimmers (one male and one female) to the Olympics.

Athlete	Event	Heat		Semifinal		Final	
Athlete	Event	Time	Rank	Time	Rank	Time	Rank
Benjamin Hockin	Men's 100 m freestyle	50.26	44	Did not advance			
Karen Riveros	Women's 100 m freestyle	59.00	39	Did not advance			

== Table tennis ==
Paraguay has received an invitation from the Tripartite Commission to send two-time Olympian Marcelo Aguirre in the men's singles to the Olympic table tennis tournament.

Athlete	Event	Preliminary	Round 1	Round 2	Round 3	Round of 16	Quarterfinals	Semifinals	Final / BM	
Athlete	Event	Opposition Result	Opposition Result	Opposition Result	Opposition Result	Opposition Result	Opposition Result	Opposition Result	Opposition Result	Rank
Marcelo Aguirre	Men's singles	Powell (AUS); W 4–0	Dyjas (POL); L 0–4	Did not advance						

== Tennis ==
Paraguay has received an invitation from the Tripartite Commission to send London 2012 Olympian Verónica Cepede Royg (world no. 136) in the women's singles into the Olympic tennis tournament.

Athlete	Event	Round of 64	Round of 32	Round of 16	Quarterfinals	Semifinals	Final / BM	
Athlete	Event	Opposition Score	Opposition Score	Opposition Score	Opposition Score	Opposition Score	Opposition Score	Rank
Verónica Cepede Royg	Women's singles	Niculescu (ROU); L 2–6, 3–6	Did not advance					

== See also ==
- Paraguay at the 2015 Pan American Games
