= Paraguay at the 2004 Summer Olympics =

- IOC code: PAR
- NOC: Comité Olímpico Paraguayo
- Website: www.cop.org.py (in Spanish)

in Athens
- Competitors: 23 in 4 sports
- Flag bearer: Rocio Rivarola
- Medals Ranked 65th: Gold 0 Silver 1 Bronze 0 Total 1

Summer Olympics appearances (overview)
- 1968; 1972; 1976; 1980; 1984; 1988; 1992; 1996; 2000; 2004; 2008; 2012; 2016; 2020; 2024; 2028

Paraguay competed at the 2004 Summer Olympics in Athens, Greece, from 13 to 29 August 2004. This was the nation's ninth appearance at the Olympics, except the 1980 Summer Olympics in Moscow because of its partial support to the United States boycott.

Comité Olímpico Paraguayo sent the nation's largest delegation to the Games since the 1992 Summer Olympics in Barcelona due to the presence of the men's football team. A total of 23 athletes, 21 men and 2 women, competed only in athletics, football, rowing, and swimming. The Paraguayan team featured two notable female athletes: javelin thrower Leryn Franco, who aspired to be one of the most beautiful women to compete at the Olympics because of her professional career as a model and beauty contestant, and single sculls rower Rocio Rivarola, aged seventeen, who later became the nation's first ever female flag bearer in the opening ceremony.

Paraguay left Athens with its first Olympic silver medal from the men's football team, following its defeat against Argentina with a score of 0–1 in the final match of the tournament.

== Medalists ==
| Medal | Name | Sport | Event | Date |
|---|---|---|---|---|
| Silver | Paraguay national football team: Fredy Barreiro; Diego Barreto; Edgar Barreto; Pedro Benitez; José Cardozo; Ernesto Cristaldo; José Devaca; Osvaldo Diaz; Julio César Enciso; Celso Esquivel; Diego Figueredo; Carlos Gamarra; Pablo Giménez; Julio González; Julio Manzur; Emilio Martinez; Rodrigo Romero; Aureliano Torres | Football | Men's tournament | August 28 |

== Athletics ==
Paraguayan athletes have so far achieved qualifying standards in the following athletics events (up to a maximum of 3 athletes in each event at the 'A' Standard, and 1 at the 'B' Standard).

Key

- Note–Ranks given for track events are within the athlete's heat only
- Q = Qualified for the next round
- q = Qualified for the next round as a fastest loser or, in field events, by position without achieving the qualifying target
- NR = National record
- N/A = Round not applicable for the event
- Bye = Athlete not required to compete in round

Men
Track & road events

| Athlete | Event | Heat | | Quarterfinal | | Semifinal | | Final | |
| Athlete | Event | Result | Rank | Result | Rank | Result | Rank | Result | Rank |
|---|---|---|---|---|---|---|---|---|---|
| Diego Ferreira | 100 m | 10.50 NR | 5 | did not advance | | | | | |

Women
Field events

| Athlete | Event | Qualification | | Final | |
| Athlete | Event | Distance | Position | Distance | Position |
|---|---|---|---|---|---|
| Leryn Franco | Javelin throw | 50.37 | 42 | did not advance | |

== Football ==
=== Men's tournament ===
Paraguay national football team faced a stiff test in order to qualify for the Athens Games, getting two goals in the last ten minutes to beat Chile, and edging Brazil to qualify out of South America, along with Argentina. On 4 August, before the Summer Olympics began, Paraguay measured against the Portugal of Cristiano Ronaldo in the city of Algarve, resulting in a 5–0 defeat.

Roster

The following is the Paraguayan squad in the men's football tournament of the 2004 Summer Olympics.

Head coach: Carlos Jara Saguier

| No. | Pos. | Player | Date of birth (age) | Caps | Goals | 2004 club |
|---|---|---|---|---|---|---|
| 1 | GK | Rodrigo Romero | 8 November 1982 (aged 21) | 0 | 0 | (Paraguayan Football Association) Nacional Asunción |
| 2 | DF | Emilio Martinez | 10 April 1981 (aged 23) | 8 | 0 | (Paraguayan Football Association) Libertad |
| 3 | DF | Julio Manzur | 22 June 1981 (aged 23) | 8 | 0 | (Paraguayan Football Association) Guaraní |
| 4 | DF | Carlos Gamarra* | 17 February 1971 (aged 33) | 11 | 5 | (Italian Football Federation) Inter Milan |
| 5 | DF | José Devaca | 18 September 1982 (aged 21) | 8 | 1 | (Paraguayan Football Association) Cerro Porteño |
| 6 | DF | Celso Esquivel | 20 March 1981 (aged 23) | 0 | 0 | (Argentine Football Association) San Lorenzo |
| 7 | FW | Pablo Giménez | 29 June 1981 (aged 23) | 8 | 1 | (Paraguayan Football Association) Guaraní |
| 8 | MF | Edgar Barreto | 15 July 1984 (aged 20) | 8 | 0 | (Royal Dutch Football Association) NEC Nijmegen |
| 9 | FW | Fredy Barreiro | 27 March 1982 (aged 22) | 8 | 2 | (Paraguayan Football Association) Libertad |
| 10 | MF | Diego Figueredo | 28 April 1982 (aged 22) | 8 | 2 | (Royal Spanish Football Federation) Real Valladolid |
| 11 | DF | Aureliano Torres | 16 June 1982 (aged 22) | 8 | 1 | (Paraguayan Football Association) Guaraní |
| 12 | DF | Pedro Benitez | 23 March 1981 (aged 23) | 0 | 0 | (Paraguayan Football Association) Cerro Porteño |
| 13 | MF | Julio César Enciso* | 5 August 1974 (aged 30) | 0 | 0 | (Paraguayan Football Association) Olimpia Asunción |
| 14 | FW | Julio González | 26 August 1981 (aged 22) | 8 | 2 | (Paraguayan Football Association) Nacional Asunción |
| 15 | DF | Ernesto Cristaldo | 16 March 1984 (aged 20) | 0 | 0 | (Paraguayan Football Association) Cerro Porteño |
| 16 | MF | Osvaldo Diaz | 22 December 1981 (aged 22) | 8 | 1 | (Paraguayan Football Association) Guaraní |
| 17 | FW | José Cardozo* | 14 March 1971 (aged 33) | 6 | 2 | (Mexican Football Federation) Toluca |
| 18 | GK | Diego Barreto | 16 July 1981 (aged 23) | 8 | 0 | (Paraguayan Football Association) Cerro Porteño |

* Over-aged player.

Group play

| Pos | Team | Pld | W | D | L | GF | GA | GD | Pts | Qualification |
|---|---|---|---|---|---|---|---|---|---|---|
| 1 | Paraguay | 3 | 2 | 0 | 1 | 6 | 5 | +1 | 6 | Qualified for the quarterfinals |
| 2 | Italy | 3 | 1 | 1 | 1 | 5 | 5 | 0 | 4 | Qualified for the quarterfinals |
| 3 | Ghana | 3 | 1 | 1 | 1 | 4 | 4 | 0 | 4 | |
| 4 | Japan | 3 | 1 | 0 | 2 | 6 | 7 | −1 | 3 | |

12 August 2004
20:30

| Paraguay | 4 – 3 | Japan |
|---|---|---|
| Giménez 5'; Cardozo 26', 37'; Torres 62' | Report | Ono 22' (pen.), 53' (pen.); Okubo 81' |

Kaftanzoglio Stadium, Thessaloniki
Attendance: 5,381
Referee: Essam Abd El Fatah (Egypt)

15 August 2004
20:30

| Paraguay | 1 – 2 | Ghana |
|---|---|---|
| Gamarra 76' | Report | Tiero 81'; Appiah 84' |

Kaftanzoglio Stadium, Thessaloniki
Attendance: 1,119
Referee: Benito Archundia (Mexico)

18 August 2004
20:30

| Paraguay | 1 – 0 | Italy |
|---|---|---|
| Bareiro 14' | Report |

Karaiskaki Stadium, Piraeus
Attendance: 24,160
Referee: Claus Bo Larsen (Denmark)

Quarterfinals

21 August 2004
21:00

| Paraguay | 3 – 2 | South Korea |
|---|---|---|
| Bareiro 19', 71'; Cardozo 61' | Report | Lee C.S. 74', 79' (pen.) |

Kaftanzoglio Stadium, Thessaloniki
Attendance: 4,080
Referee: Massimo De Santis (Italy)

Semifinals

24 August 2004
21:00

| Iraq | 1 – 3 | Paraguay |
|---|---|---|
| Farhan 83' | Report | Cardozo 17', 34'; Bareiro 68' |

Kaftanzoglio Stadium, Thessaloniki
Attendance: 6,213
Referee: Éric Poulat (France)

Gold medal match

28 August 2004
10:00

| Argentina | 1 – 0 | Paraguay |
|---|---|---|
| Tevez 18' | Report |

Olympic Stadium, Athens
Attendance: 41,116
Referee: Kyros Vassaras (Greece)

Won silver medal

== Rowing ==
Paraguayan rowers qualified the following boats:

Men

| Athlete | Event | Heats | | Repechage | | Semifinals | | Final | |
| Athlete | Event | Time | Rank | Time | Rank | Time | Rank | Time | Rank |
|---|---|---|---|---|---|---|---|---|---|
| Daniel Sosa | Single sculls | 7:52.50 | 5 R | 7:21.03 | 4 SD/E | 7:36.87 | 4 FE | 7:13.49 | 26 |

Women

| Athlete | Event | Heats | | Repechage | | Semifinals | | Final | |
| Athlete | Event | Time | Rank | Time | Rank | Time | Rank | Time | Rank |
|---|---|---|---|---|---|---|---|---|---|
| Rocio Rivarola | Single sculls | 8:03.85 | 4 R | 7:57.77 | 4 SC/D | 8:05.92 | 5 FD | 7:57.36 | 21 |

Qualification Legend: FA=Final A (medal); FB=Final B (non-medal); FC=Final C (non-medal); FD=Final D (non-medal); FE=Final E (non-medal); FF=Final F (non-medal); SA/B=Semifinals A/B; SC/D=Semifinals C/D; SE/F=Semifinals E/F; R=Repechage

== Swimming ==
Men

| Athlete | Event | Heat | | Semifinal | | Final | |
| Athlete | Event | Time | Rank | Time | Rank | Time | Rank |
|---|---|---|---|---|---|---|---|
| Sergio Cabrera | 200 m butterfly | 2:06.15 | 35 | did not advance | | | |

== See also ==
- Paraguay at the 2003 Pan American Games
