= Julia Marino =

Julia Marino may refer to:

- Julia Marino (snowboarder), slopestyle gold medal winner from the United States
- Julia Marino (skier), Olympic competitor for Paraguay
