= Refaat Kaid =

Egyptian sports shooter

Personal information
- Nationality: Egyptian
- Born: 4 December 1949 (age 76)

Sport
- Sport: Sports shooting

Refaat Kaid (born 4 December 1949) is an Egyptian sports shooter. He competed in the men's 25 metre rapid fire pistol event at the 1984 Summer Olympics.
