= Allyn Johnson =

American sports shooter

Personal information
- Born: January 27, 1938 (age 88) Los Angeles, California, United States

Sport
- Sport: Sports shooting

Allyn Johnson (born January 27, 1938) is an American sports shooter. He competed in the men's 25 metre rapid fire pistol event at the 1984 Summer Olympics.
