= Rauno Bies =

Finnish sport shooter

Olympic medal record

Men's shooting

Representing Finland
Bronze medal – third place	1984 Los Angeles	rapid fire pistol

Rauno Bies (born 30 October 1961) is a Finnish former sport shooter who competed in the 1984 Summer Olympics.
