= Viktor Engel =

German sports shooter

Personal information
- Nationality: German
- Born: 23 September 1946 (age 80) Mecklenburg-Vorpommern, Germany

Sport
- Sport: Sports shooting

Viktor Engel (born 23 September 1946) is a German sports shooter. He competed in the men's 25 metre rapid fire pistol event at the 1984 Summer Olympics.
