= Paraguay at the 2020 Summer Olympics =

- IOC code: PAR
- NOC: Comité Olímpico Paraguayo
- Website: www.cop.org.py (in Spanish)

in Tokyo, Japan July 23, 2021 – August 8, 2021
- Competitors: 8 in 6 sports
- Flag bearers (opening): Verónica Cepede; Fabrizio Zanotti
- Flag bearer (closing): Derlis Ayala
- Medals: Gold 0 Silver 0 Bronze 0 Total 0

Summer Olympics appearances (overview)
- 1968; 1972; 1976; 1980; 1984; 1988; 1992; 1996; 2000; 2004; 2008; 2012; 2016; 2020; 2024

Paraguay competed at the 2020 Summer Olympics in Tokyo. Originally scheduled to take place from 24 July to 9 August 2020, the Games have been postponed to 23 July to 8 August 2021, because of the COVID-19 pandemic. It was the nation's thirteenth appearance at the Summer Olympics, with the exception of the 1980 Summer Olympics in Moscow because of the nation's partial support for the US-led boycott.

== Competitors ==
The following is the list of number of competitors participating in the Games:

| Sport | Men | Women | Total |
|---|---|---|---|
| Athletics | 1 | 1 | 2 |
| Cycling | 0 | 1 | 1 |
| Golf | 1 | 0 | 1 |
| Rowing | 0 | 1 | 1 |
| Swimming | 1 | 1 | 2 |
| Tennis | 0 | 1 | 1 |
| Total | 3 | 5 | 8 |

== Athletics ==
Paraguayan athletes achieved the entry standards, either by qualifying time or by world ranking, in the following track and field events (up to a maximum of 3 athletes in each event):

Key

- Note–Ranks given for track events are within the athlete's heat only
- Q = Qualified for the next round
- q = Qualified for the next round as a fastest loser or, in field events, by position without achieving the qualifying target
- NR = National record
- N/A = Round not applicable for the event
- Bye = Athlete not required to compete in round

Track & road events

| Athlete | Event | Heat | | Semifinal | | Final | |
| Athlete | Event | Result | Rank | Result | Rank | Result | Rank |
|---|---|---|---|---|---|---|---|
| Derlis Ayala | Men's marathon | —N/a | | | | 2:18:34 SB | 43 |
| Ana Camila Pirelli | Women's 100 m hurdles | 13.98 SB | 9 | Did not advance | | | |

== Cycling ==
=== Road ===
Paraguay entered one rider each to compete in the women's Olympic road race for the first time in history, by securing an outright berth, as the highest-ranked cyclist, not yet qualified, at the 2019 Pan American Championships in Mexico.

| Athlete | Event | Time | Rank |
|---|---|---|---|
| Agua Marina Espínola | Women's road race | Did not finish | |

== Golf ==
Paraguay entered one golfer into the Olympic tournament. Rio 2016 Olympian Fabrizio Zanotti (world no. 280) qualified directly among the top 60 eligible players for the men's event based on the IGF World Rankings of 20 June 2021.

| Athlete | Event | Round 1 | Round 2 | Round 3 | Round 4 | Total | | |
| Athlete | Event | Score | Score | Score | Score | Score | Par | Rank |
|---|---|---|---|---|---|---|---|---|
| Fabrizio Zanotti | Men's | 73 | 67 | 68 | 69 | 277 | −7 | =35 |

== Rowing ==
Paraguay qualified one boat in the women's single sculls for the Games by winning the silver medal and securing the second of five berths available at the 2021 FISA Americas Olympic Qualification Regatta in Rio de Janeiro, Brazil, signifying the country's return to the sport for the first time since 2012.

| Athlete | Event | Heats | | Repechage | | Quarterfinals | | Semifinals | | Final | |
| Athlete | Event | Time | Rank | Time | Rank | Time | Rank | Time | Rank | Time | Rank |
|---|---|---|---|---|---|---|---|---|---|---|---|
| Alejandra Alonso | Women's single sculls | 8:11.88 | 4 R | 8:08.91 | 1 QF | 8:29.80 | 5 SC/D | 7:43.33 | 4 FD | 7:55.63 | 21 |

Qualification Legend: FA=Final A (medal); FB=Final B (non-medal); FC=Final C (non-medal); FD=Final D (non-medal); FE=Final E (non-medal); FF=Final F (non-medal); SA/B=Semifinals A/B; SC/D=Semifinals C/D; SE/F=Semifinals E/F; QF=Quarterfinals; R=Repechage

== Swimming ==
Paraguay received a universality invitation from FINA to send two top-ranked swimmers (one per gender) in their respective individual events to the Olympics, based on the FINA Points System of June 28, 2021.

| Athlete | Event | Heat | | Semifinal | | Final | |
| Athlete | Event | Time | Rank | Time | Rank | Time | Rank |
|---|---|---|---|---|---|---|---|
| Ben Hockin | Men's 100 m freestyle | 50.41 | 44 | Did not advance | | | |
| Ben Hockin | Men's 100 m butterfly | 54.81 | =51 | Did not advance | | | |
| Luana Alonso | Women's 100 m butterfly | 1:00.37 | 28 | Did not advance | | | |

== Tennis ==
Paraguay entered one tennis player into the Olympic tournament. Verónica Cepede Royg secured the outright berth in the women's singles by winning the bronze medal at the 2019 Pan American Games in Lima, Peru, replacing the slot from the U.S. tennis player Caroline Dolehide.

| Athlete | Event | Round of 64 | Round of 32 | Round of 16 | Quarterfinals | Semifinals | Final / BM | |
| Athlete | Event | Opposition Result | Opposition Result | Opposition Result | Opposition Result | Opposition Result | Opposition Result | Rank |
|---|---|---|---|---|---|---|---|---|
| Verónica Cepede Royg | Women's singles | Wang Q (CHN); L 4–6, 3–6 | Did not advance | | | | | |

== See also ==
- Paraguay at the 2019 Pan American Games
- Paraguay at the 2020 Summer Paralympics
