= Graham Harvey (sport shooter) =

British sports shooter

Personal information
- Nationality: British
- Born: 28 May 1944 (age 80); Danbury, England

Sport
- Sport: Sports shooting

Graham Harvey (born 28 May 1944) is a British sports shooter. He competed in the men's 25 metre rapid fire pistol event at the 1984 Summer Olympics.
