= Shooting at the 1984 Summer Olympics – Men's 25 metre rapid fire pistol =

Sports shooting at the Olympics

Mixed 25 metre rapid fire pistol at the Games of the XXIII Olympiad
- Shooting pictogram
- Venue: Prado Regional Park
- Dates: August 1–2, 1984
- Competitors: 55 from 31 nations
- Winning score: 595

Medalists
1st place, gold medalist(s)		Takeo Kamachi; Japan
2nd place, silver medalist(s)		Corneliu Ion; Romania
3rd place, bronze medalist(s)		Rauno Bies; Finland

The men's ISSF 25 meter rapid fire pistol was a shooting sports event held as part of the Shooting at the 1984 Summer Olympics programme. The competition was held on August 1 and 2 at the shooting ranges in Los Angeles. 55 shooters from 31 nations competed. Nations had been limited to two shooters each since the 1952 Games. The event was won by Takeo Kamachi of Japan, the nation's first rapid fire pistol medal. Defending champion Corneliu Ion of Romania took silver, the seventh man to win multiple medals in the event. Finland's Rauno Bies earned bronze, the first medal for a Finn in the rapid fire pistol since 1964.

== Background ==
This was the 17th appearance of what had been standardised in 1948 as the men's ISSF 25 meter rapid fire pistol event, the only event on the 2020 programme that traces back to 1896. The event has been held at every Summer Olympics except 1904 and 1928 (when no shooting events were held) and 1908; it was nominally open to women from 1968 to 1980, although very few women participated these years. The first five events were quite different, with some level of consistency finally beginning with the 1932 event—which, though it had differences from the 1924 competition, was roughly similar. The 1936 competition followed the 1932 one quite closely. The post-World War II event substantially altered the competition once again. The 1984 Games introduced women's-only shooting events, including the ISSF 25 meter pistol (though this was more similar to the non-Olympic men's ISSF 25 meter center-fire pistol than the rapid fire pistol).

Three of the top 10 shooters from 1980 returned: gold medalist Corneliu Ion of Romania, bronze medalist Gerhard Petritsch of Austria, and seventh-place finisher Marin Stan of Romania. Japan's Takeo Kamachi, who had competed in 1968, 1972, and 1976 but never finished in the top 10, also returned. Reigning (1982) world champion Igor Puzirev of the Soviet Union did not compete due to the Soviet-led boycott, but runner-up Ove Gunnarsson of Sweden and third-place finisher Alfred Radke of West Germany were present.

Bahrain, the People's Republic of China, Ecuador, Oman, Paraguay, Qatar, Saudi Arabia, and Senegal each made their debut in the event. The United States made its 14th appearance, most of any nation.

== Competition format ==
The competition format followed the 1948 format, now very close to the modern rapid fire pistol competition after significant variation before World War II. Each shooter fired 60 shots. These were done in two courses of 30; each course consisted of two stages of 15; each stage consisted of three series of 5. In each stage, the time limit for each series was 8 seconds for the first, 6 seconds for the second, and 4 seconds for the third. Ties for medals were broken via shoot-off, with each shoot-off round consisting of 3 series of 5 shots.

A holdover from the previous Games was that silhouettes, rather than round targets, continued to be used; however, scoring rings had been added so that now each shot was scored up to 10 rather than being strictly hit or miss.

One change from 1948–1956 was that hits were no longer the primary measurement of success. As in 1960–1980, ranking was done by score, regardless of hits.

== Records ==
Prior to the competition, the existing world and Olympic records were as follows.

World record				
Olympic record	Norbert Klaar (GDR)	597	Montreal, Canada	22–23 July 1976

No new world or Olympic records were set during the competition.

== Schedule ==
Date	Time	Round
Wednesday, 1 August 1984	9:00	Course 1
Thursday, 2 August 1984	9:00	Course 2

== Results ==
Rank	Shooter	Nation	Total	Notes
1st place, gold medalist(s)	Takeo Kamachi	Japan	595	
2nd place, silver medalist(s)	Corneliu Ion	Romania	593	
3rd place, bronze medalist(s)	Rauno Bies	Finland	591	Shoot-off: 146
4	Delival Nobre	Brazil	591	Shoot-off: 141
5	Yang Chung-yeol	South Korea	590	
6	Alfred Radke	West Germany	590	
7	Park Jong-Gil	South Korea	590	
8	Bernardo Tovar	Colombia	590	
9	Viktor Engel	West Germany	589	
10	Juan Seguí	Spain	589	
11	Gerhard Petritsch	Austria	589	
11	Roberto Vannozzi	Italy	589	
13	Aldo Andreotti	Italy	588	
13	Du Xuean	China	588	
13	Mark Howkins	Canada	588	
13	Li Zhongqi	China	588	
13	Opas Ruengpanyawoodhi	Thailand	588	
13	Marin Stan	Romania	588	
19	Pedro García Jr.	Peru	587	
20	Allyn Johnson	United States	586	
20	Francisco Neto	Portugal	586	
22	Refaat Kaid	Egypt	585	
23	Hiroyuki Akatsuka	Japan	583	
23	John Cooke	Great Britain	583	
23	Graham Harvey	Great Britain	583	
26	John McNally	United States	581	
26	Mario Sánchez	Mexico	581	
28	Daniel César Felizia	Argentina	580	
29	Alfredo González	Colombia	579	
29	Eduardo Jiménez	Spain	579	
29	Eliseo Paolini	San Marino	579	
32	Leopoldo Fossati	Argentina	578	
32	Rajinder Kumar Vij	India	578	
34	Mohinder Lal	India	577	
34	Bruno Morri	San Marino	577	
34	Ragnar Skanåker	Sweden	577	
37	Ove Gunnarsson	Sweden	576	
37	Solomon Lee	Hong Kong	576	
37	Jules Sobrian	Canada	576	
40	Peera Piromrut	Thailand	575	
41	Emad El-Gaindi	Egypt	573	
42	Said Al-Karbi	Qatar	571	
42	José Jacques Pena	Portugal	571	
44	Said Al-Khatry	Oman	566	
45	Abdullah Al-Hussini	Oman	561	
46	Safaq Al-Anzi	Saudi Arabia	560	
46	Ho Chung Kin	Hong Kong	560	
46	William Wilka	Paraguay	560	
49	Eid Fayroze	Qatar	557	
50	Sayed Al-Asibi	Saudi Arabia	545	
51	Mohamed Abdul Rahman	Bahrain	535	
52	Mamadou Sow	Senegal	528	
53	Ronald Dunn	Ecuador	524	
54	Alfredo Coello	Paraguay	522	
55	Ali Al-Khalifa	Bahrain	506	
