= Paraguay at the 2024 Summer Olympics =

- IOC code: PAR
- NOC: Comité Olímpico Paraguayo
- Website: www.cop.org.py (in Spanish)

in Paris, France 26 July 2024 – 11 August 2024
- Competitors: 28 (22 men and 6 women) in 7 sports
- Flag bearers (opening): Fabrizio Zanotti & Alejandra Alonso
- Flag bearer (closing): Gabriela Narváez
- Medals: Gold 0 Silver 0 Bronze 0 Total 0

Summer Olympics appearances (overview)
- 1968; 1972; 1976; 1980; 1984; 1988; 1992; 1996; 2000; 2004; 2008; 2012; 2016; 2020; 2024; 2028

Paraguay competed at the 2024 Summer Olympics in Paris from 26 July to 11 August 2024. It was the nation's seventeenth appearance at the Summer Olympics. It is the nation's fourteenth straight appearance at the Summer Olympics, except for the 1980 edition in Moscow, because of the nation's partial support for the US-led boycott. Paraguay has yet to earn its first Olympic gold medal; César Almirón was disqualified from the repechange in the Men's 200 m, and Paraguay were eliminated by Egypt in the quarterfinals in football 4–5 on penalty kicks.

== Competitors ==
The following is the list of number of competitors in the Games. Note that reserves in football are not counted:

Sport	Men	Women	Total
Athletics	1	1	2
Football	18	0	18
Golf	1	0	1
Judo	0	1	1
Rowing	1	1	2
Swimming	1	1	2
Volleyball	0	2	2
Total	22	6	28

== Athletics ==
Paraguayan athletes achieved the entry standards, either by qualifying time or by world ranking, in the following track and field events (up to a maximum of 3 athletes in each event):

Key

- Note–Ranks given for track events are within the athlete's heat only
- Q = Qualified for the next round
- q = Qualified for the next round as a fastest loser or, in field events, by position without achieving the qualifying target
- NR = National record
- N/A = Round not applicable for the event
- Bye = Athlete not required to compete in round

Track & road events

Athlete	Event	Preliminary		Heat		Repechage		Semifinal		Final	
Athlete	Event	Result	Rank	Result	Rank	Result	Rank	Result	Rank	Result	Rank
César Almirón	Men's 200 m	—N/a		20.87	6 R	DQ		Did not advance			
Xenia Hiebert	Women's 100 m	11.77	3 Q	11.82	9	—N/a		Did not advance			

== Football ==
Summary

Key:

- A.E.T – After extra time.
- P – Match decided by penalty-shootout.

Team	Event	Group Stage				Quarterfinal	Semifinal	Final / BM	
Team	Event	Opposition Score	Opposition Score	Opposition Score	Rank	Opposition Score	Opposition Score	Opposition Score	Rank
Paraguay men's	Men's tournament	Japan; L 0–5	Israel; W 4–2	Mali; W 1–0	2 Q	Egypt; D 1–1 (a.e.t.); P 4–5	Did not advance		6

=== Men's tournament ===
Paraguay men's football team qualified for the Olympics following the triumph of the champion title at the 2024 CONMEBOL Pre-Olympic Tournament in Venezuela, marking the nation's return to the sport, after the last participation in 2004.

Team roster

Paraguay announced their final squad on 3 July 2024. Gatito Fernández and Fabián Balbuena were added to the squad on 9 July, replacing the injured Ángel González and Gustavo Caballero. On 15 July, Fabrizio Peralta withdrew injured and was replaced by Julio Enciso. On 23 July, Diego González withdrew injured and was replaced by Gustavo Caballero, while Ángel Cardozo Lucena was called-up as an alternate player.

Head coach: Carlos Jara Saguier

No.	Pos.	Player	Date of birth (age)	Club
1	GK	Gatito Fernández*	29 March 1988 (aged 36)	(Brazilian Football Confederation) Botafogo
2	DF	Alan Núñez	1 October 2004 (aged 19)	(Paraguayan Football Association) Cerro Porteño
3	DF	Ronaldo De Jesús	21 April 2001 (aged 23)	(Paraguayan Football Association) Cerro Porteño
4	DF	Daniel Rivas	6 December 2001 (aged 22)	(Paraguayan Football Association) Nacional
5	DF	Gilberto Flores	1 April 2003 (aged 21)	(Paraguayan Football Association) Sportivo Trinidense
6	MF	Marcos Gómez	10 November 2001 (aged 22)	(Paraguayan Football Association) Olimpia
7	FW	Marcelo Fernández	25 October 2001 (aged 22)	(Paraguayan Football Association) Libertad
8	MF	Diego Gómez (captain)	27 March 2003 (aged 21)	(United States Soccer Federation) Inter Miami
9	FW	Kevin Parzajuk	9 August 2002 (aged 21)	(Paraguayan Football Association) Olimpia
10	MF	Wilder Viera	4 March 2002 (aged 22)	(Paraguayan Football Association) Cerro Porteño
11	FW	Enso González	20 January 2005 (aged 19)	(The Football Association) Wolverhampton Wanderers
12	GK	Rodrigo Frutos	6 January 2003 (aged 21)	(Paraguayan Football Association) Olimpia
13	DF	Alexis Cantero	5 February 2003 (aged 21)	(Paraguayan Football Association) Guaraní
14	DF	Fabián Balbuena*	23 August 1991 (aged 32)	(Russian Football Union) Dynamo Moscow
15	MF	Julio Enciso	23 January 2004 (aged 20)	(The Football Association) Brighton & Hove Albion
16	DF	Fernando Román	23 February 2001 (aged 23)	(Paraguayan Football Association) Guaraní
17	FW	Gustavo Caballero	21 September 2001 (aged 22)	(Paraguayan Football Association) Nacional
18	FW	Marcelo Pérez	23 March 2001 (aged 23)	(Argentine Football Association) Huracán
20	MF	Ángel Cardozo Lucena*	19 October 1994 (aged 29)	(Paraguayan Football Association) Libertad

* Overage player.

Group play

Pos	Team	Pld	W	D	L	GF	GA	GD	Pts	Qualification
1	Japan	3	3	0	0	7	0	+7	9	Advance to knockout stage
2	Paraguay	3	2	0	1	5	7	−2	6	Advance to knockout stage
3	Mali	3	0	1	2	1	3	−2	1	
4	Israel	3	0	1	2	3	6	−3	1	

Source: FIFA
Rules for classification: Group stage tiebreakers
24 July 2024
19:00

Japan	5–0	Paraguay
Mito 18', 63'; Yamamoto 69'; Fujio 81', 87'	Report

Stade de Bordeaux, Bordeaux
Attendance: 14,000
Referee: François Letexier (France)

27 July 2024
19:00

Israel	2–4	Paraguay
Gandelman 53'; Gloukh 80'	Report	M. Fernández 25', 90+6'; Enciso 69'; Balbuena 90+3'

Parc des Princes, Paris
Attendance: 28,887
Referee: Drew Fischer (Canada)

30 July 2024
21:00

Paraguay	1–0	Mali
M. Fernández 5'	Report

Parc des Princes, Paris
Attendance: 35,736
Referee: Ilgiz Tantashev (Uzbekistan)

Quarterfinals

2 August 2024
19:00

Egypt	1–1 (a.e.t.)	Paraguay
Adel 88'	Report	D. Gómez 71'
Penalties
Koka (penalty scored); Elneny (penalty scored); El Debes (penalty scored); Abdelmaguid (penalty scored); Adel (penalty scored)	5–4	(penalty scored) D. Gómez; (penalty missed) Pérez; (penalty scored) Viera; (penalty scored) M. Gómez; (penalty scored) Balbuena

Stade de Marseille, Marseille
Attendance: 23,753
Referee: Glenn Nyberg (Sweden)

== Golf ==
Paraguay entered one male golfer into the Olympic tournament. Fabrizio Zanotti qualified directly for the games in the men's individual competitions, based on his world ranking performance, on the IGF World Rankings.

Men

Athlete	Event	Round 1	Round 2	Round 3	Round 4	Total		
Athlete	Event	Score	Score	Score	Score	Score	Par	Rank
Fabrizio Zanotti	Individual	70	69	71	71	281	−3	T33

== Judo ==
Paraguay qualified one judoka for the following weight class at the Games. Gabriela Narváez (women's extra-lightweight) got qualified via continental quota based on Olympic point rankings.

Athlete	Event	Round of 32	Round of 16	Quarterfinals	Semifinals	Repechage	Final / BM	
Athlete	Event	Opposition Result	Opposition Result	Opposition Result	Opposition Result	Opposition Result	Opposition Result	Rank
Gabriela Narváez	Women's −48 kg	Aymard (GAB); W 11–00	Costa (POR); W 10–00	Bavuudorjiin (MGL); L 00–10	—N/a	Abuzhakynova (KAZ); L 00–10	Did not advance	7

== Rowing ==
Paraguayan rowers qualified two boats, each in the men's and women's single sculls for the Games, through the 2024 Americas Qualification Regatta in Rio de Janeiro, Brazil.

Athlete	Event	Heats		Repechage		Quarterfinals		Semifinals		Final	
Athlete	Event	Time	Rank	Time	Rank	Time	Rank	Time	Rank	Time	Rank
Javier Insfran	Men's single sculls	7:14.14	5 R	7:08.29	2 QF	7:31.50	6 QCD	7:00.93	3 FC	6:50.48	17
Alejandra Alonso	Women's single sculls	7:52.44	4 R	7:57.14	1 QF	7:47.40	4 QCD	7:56.50	4 FD	7:42.09	19

Qualification Legend: FA=Final A (medal); FB=Final B (non-medal); FC=Final C (non-medal); FD=Final D (non-medal); FE=Final E (non-medal); FF=Final F (non-medal); SA/B=Semifinals A/B; SC/D=Semifinals C/D; SE/F=Semifinals E/F; QF=Quarterfinals; R=Repechage

== Swimming ==
Paraguay sent two swimmers to compete at the 2024 Paris Olympics.

Athlete	Event	Heat		Semifinal		Final	
Athlete	Event	Time	Rank	Time	Rank	Time	Rank
Matheo Mateos	Men's 200 m medley	2:03.45	20	Did not advance			
Luana Alonso	Women's 100 m butterfly	1.03.09	29	Did not advance			

== Volleyball ==
=== Beach ===
Paraguay women's pair qualified for Paris after winning the 2024 CSV Continental Cup Final in Asunción, marking the nation's debut in the sport.

Athletes	Event	Preliminary round				Round of 16	Quarterfinal	Semifinal	Final / BM	
Athletes	Event	Opposition Score	Opposition Score	Opposition Score	Rank	Opposition Score	Opposition Score	Opposition Score	Opposition Score	Rank
Giuliana Poletti; Michelle Valiente	Women's	Melissa / Brandie (CAN); L 16–21, 12–21	Tīna / Anastasija (LAT); L 19–21, 15–21	Esmée / Zoé (SUI); L 21–23, 21–18, 12–15	4	Did not advance				19

== See also ==
- Paraguay at the 2023 Pan American Games
