= Golf at the 2019 Pan American Games – Men's individual =

Golf – Men's individual at the 2019 Pan American Games
- Venue: Country Club Villa
- Start date: August 8, 2019
- End date: August 11, 2019
- Competitors: 32 from 17 nations
- Winning score: 269 (−15)

Medalists
Gold medal	Fabrizio Zanotti	Paraguay
Silver medal	José Toledo	Guatemala
Bronze medal	Mito Pereira	Chile

The men's individual competition of the Golf events at the 2019 Pan American Games was held between August 8 and 11 at the Country Club Villa in Lima, Peru.

Fabrizio Zanotti won the gold medal for Paraguay, its first gold medal in the Pan American Games.

== Schedule ==
All times are PET (UTC−5).

Date	Time	Round
August 8, 2019	8:00	Round 1
August 9, 2019	8:00	Round 2
August 10, 2019	8:00	Round 3
August 11, 2019	8:00	Round 4

== Results ==
The final results were:

Rank	Name	Nation	Round 1	Round 2	Round 3	Round 4	Total
1st place, gold medalist(s)	Fabrizio Zanotti	Paraguay	64	67	68	70	269 (−15)
2nd place, silver medalist(s)	José Toledo	Guatemala	69	68	68	64	269 (−15)
3rd place, bronze medalist(s)	Mito Pereira	Chile	67	67	69	66	269 (−15)
4	Brandon Wu (a)	United States	64	65	70	71	270 (−14)
5	Luis Fernando Barco	Peru	67	68	68	69	272 (−12)
6	Austin Connelly	Canada	69	71	65	68	273 (−11)
7	Miguel Ángel Carballo	Argentina	68	65	71	70	274 (−10)
T8	Juan Álvarez	Uruguay	70	72	67	67	276 (−8)
T8	Santiago Gomez	Colombia	70	70	69	67	276 (−8)
T8	Julián Périco (a)	Peru	70	73	66	67	276 (−8)
T8	Manuel Torres	Venezuela	72	65	70	69	276 (−8)
12	Raúl Cortes	Mexico	72	67	67	71	277 (−7)
13	Stewart Hagestad (a)	United States	65	73	70	70	278 (−6)
T14	Estanislao Goya	Argentina	70	70	72	67	279 (−5)
T14	Wolmer Murillo	Venezuela	70	70	70	69	279 (−5)
T14	Alexandre Rocha	Brazil	70	69	73	67	279 (−5)
T14	Guillermo Pumarol	Dominican Republic	73	69	69	68	279 (−5)
18	Daniel Gurtner (a)	Guatemala	68	70	73	69	280 (−4)
19	Carlos Franco	Paraguay	71	69	71	72	283 (−1)
20	Adilson da Silva	Brazil	75	71	71	67	284 (E)
21	Juan Jose Guerra (a)	Dominican Republic	72	70	72	72	286 (+2)
T22	Ricardo Celia	Colombia	72	71	75	70	288 (+4)
T22	Edward Figueroa	Puerto Rico	73	68	75	72	288 (+4)
T22	Gonzalo Rubio	Mexico	80	70	67	71	288 (+4)
25	Facundo Alvarez (a)	Uruguay	70	71	77	73	291 (+7)
26	José Miranda	Ecuador	71	74	73	75	293 (+9)
T27	Paul Chaplet (a)	Costa Rica	71	74	75	74	294 (+10)
T27	José Méndez	Costa Rica	77	72	71	74	294 (+10)
T27	Joey Savoie (a)	Canada	70	75	76	73	294 (+10)
T30	Felipe Aguilar	Chile	76	74	72	75	297 (+13)
T30	Jean Louis Ducruet	Panama	71	76	74	76	297 (+13)
32	Michael Mendez	Panama	73	76	72	81	302 (+18)

(a) denotes an amateur

The medals were determined in a sudden-death playoff. Zanotti won the gold on the first extra hole while Toledo took the silver on the 11th extra hole.
