= Leopoldo Fossati =

Argentine sports shooter

Personal information
- Nationality: Argentine
- Born: 12 July 1948 (age 76)

Sport
- Sport: Sports shooting

Leopoldo Fossati (born 12 July 1948) is an Argentine sports shooter. He competed in the men's 25 metre rapid fire pistol event at the 1984 Summer Olympics. He also was a participant at the Shooting World Cup and was still active in the 2000s, winning a bronze medal in 2007 at the national championships. He had a son who also was a medalist at the national championships.
