= Francisco Neto (sport shooter) =

Portuguese sports shooter

Personal information
- Nationality: Portuguese
- Born: 28 September 1944
- Died: 14 November 2014 (aged 70)

Sport
- Sport: Sports shooting

Francisco Neto (28 September 1944 – 14 November 2014) was a Portuguese sports shooter. He competed in the men's 25 metre rapid fire pistol event at the 1984 Summer Olympics.
