= Paraguay at the 1984 Summer Olympics =

- IOC code: PAR
- NOC: Comité Olímpico Paraguayo

in Los Angeles
- Competitors: 14 (14 men and 0 women) in 4 sports
- Flag bearer: Max Narváez
- Medals: Gold 0 Silver 0 Bronze 0 Total 0

Summer Olympics appearances (overview)
- 1968; 1972; 1976; 1980; 1984; 1988; 1992; 1996; 2000; 2004; 2008; 2012; 2016; 2020; 2024

Paraguay competed at the 1984 Summer Olympics in Los Angeles, United States. The nation returned to the Olympic Games after participating in the American-led boycott of the 1980 Summer Olympics.

== Athletics ==
Key

- Note–Ranks given for track events are within the athlete's heat only
- Q = Qualified for the next round
- q = Qualified for the next round as a fastest loser or, in field events, by position without achieving the qualifying target
- NR = National record
- N/A = Round not applicable for the event
- Bye = Athlete not required to compete in round

Men
Track & road events

Athlete	Event	Heat		Quarterfinal		Semifinal		Final	
Athlete	Event	Result	Rank	Result	Rank	Result	Rank	Result	Rank
Francisco Figueredo	800 m	1:52.22	7	did not advance					
Ramón López	5000 m	15:15.64	13	—N/a		did not advance			
Ramón López	10,000 m	did not finish		—N/a				did not advance	
Ramón López	3000 m steeplechase	9:36.36		—N/a		did not advance			
Nicolás Chaparro	110 m hurdles	15.51	6	—N/a		did not advance			
Nicolás Chaparro	400 m hurdles	56.98	8	—N/a		did not advance			

Field

Athlete	Event	Qualification		Final	
Athlete	Event	Distance	Position	Distance	Position
Oscar Diesel	Long jump	6.78	28	did not advance	
Oscar Diesel	Triple jump	14.19	28	did not advance	

Combined Events

Athlete	Event	Final	
Athlete	Event	Distance	Position
Claudio Escauriza	Decathlon	6546	22

== Boxing ==
Boxer	Weight class	Round of 32	Round of 16	Quarterfinals	Semifinals	Final / Bronze match	
Boxer	Weight class	Opposition Score	Opposition Score	Opposition Score	Opposition Score	Opposition Score	Rank
Oppe Pinto	Flyweight	Seymour (BAH); W	Ayesu (MAW); L	did not advance			9T
Perfecto Bobadilla	Light-middleweight	bye	Ollo (ARG); L	did not advance			17T

== Judo ==
Athlete	Weight class	Round of 32	Round of 16	Quarterfinals	Semifinals	Final / Bronze match	
Athlete	Weight class	Opposition Score	Opposition Score	Opposition Score	Opposition Score	Opposition Score	Rank
Max Narváez	Half lightweight	Alexandre (FRA); L	did not advance				20T

== Shooting ==
Shooter	Event	Final	
Shooter	Event	Score	Rank
William Wilka	25 m rapid fire pistol	560	46T
Alfredo Coello	25 m rapid fire pistol	522	54
Olegario Farrés	Mixed trap	144	67
Osvaldo Farrés	Mixed trap	134	68
Vicente Bergues	Mixed skeet	168	61
Ricardo Tellechea	Mixed skeet	146	67

== See also ==
- Paraguay at the 1983 Pan American Games
