= Eduardo Jiménez (sport shooter) =

Spanish sports shooter

Personal information
- Nationality: Spanish
- Born: 3 July 1947 (age 77)

Sport
- Sport: Sports shooting

Eduardo Jiménez (born 3 July 1947) is a Spanish sports shooter. He competed in the men's 25 metre rapid fire pistol event at the 1984 Summer Olympics.
