= Roberto Vannozzi =

Italian sports shooter

Personal information
- Nationality: Italian
- Born: 19 December 1948 (age 76); Viareggio, Italy

Sport
- Sport: Sports shooting

Roberto Vannozzi (born 19 December 1948) is an Italian sports shooter. He competed in the men's 25 metre rapid fire pistol event at the 1984 Summer Olympics.
