= Julia Marino (skier) =

Paraguayan freestyle skier (born 1992)

Personal information
- Born: April 14, 1992 (age 34) Bahía Negra, Paraguay

Julia Marino (born April 14, 1992) is an American-raised Paraguayan freestyle skier who has competed since 2010 in the halfpipe and slopestyle disciplines.

Marino was born in Bahía Negra, a small village in the Paraguayan northwestern department of Alto Paraguay, but was adopted by an American family at the age of six months. She attended Arlington Catholic High School in Arlington, MA, and transferred to Holderness School in Plymouth, NH, where she graduated in 2011. She then attended the University of Colorado in Boulder.

She competed for her adopted country until 2013, winning a World Cup silver medal during the 2012–2013 World Cup in slopestyle. After that, Marino decided to compete for her native Paraguay and has qualified to the 2014 Winter Olympics in Sochi, becoming the first Winter Olympian to represent the South American country.

== See also ==
- Paraguay at the 2014 Winter Olympics

Olympic Games
Preceded by Benjamin Hockin	Flagbearer for Paraguay; Sochi 2014	Succeeded by Julieta Granada
