= Alan Espínola =

Paraguayan swimmer

Personal information
- Born: 1 October 1971 (age 54)

Sport
- Sport: Swimming

Alan Espínola (born 1 October 1971) is a Paraguayan swimmer. He competed in two events at the 1992 Summer Olympics.
