= Paraguay at the 1976 Summer Olympics =

- IOC code: PAR
- NOC: Comité Olímpico Paraguayo

in Montreal, Canada July 17-August 1, 1976
- Competitors: 4 (4 men and 0 women) in 4 sports
- Flag bearer: Julio Abreu
- Medals: Gold 0 Silver 0 Bronze 0 Total 0

Summer Olympics appearances (overview)
- 1968; 1972; 1976; 1980; 1984; 1988; 1992; 1996; 2000; 2004; 2008; 2012; 2016; 2020; 2024

Paraguay competed at the 1976 Summer Olympics in Montreal, Canada. Four competitors, all men, took part in six events in four sports.

== Athletics ==
Men
Track & road events

Athlete	Event	Final	
Athlete	Event	Result	Rank
Eusebio Cardoso	Marathon	2:27:22	43

== Fencing ==
One fencer represented Paraguay in 1976, Bejarano was drawn in Pool nine, and won just one of his five contests.

Fencer	Event	First round		Quarterfinals		Semifinals		Final	
Fencer	Event	Result	Rank	Result	Rank	Result	Rank	Result	Rank
César Bejarano	Sabre	1–4	6	did not advance					

== Shooting ==
Athlete	Event	Final	
Athlete	Event	Points	Rank
Reinaldo Ramírez	50 m free rifle, three positions	1015	55

== Swimming ==
Men

Athlete	Event	Heat		Final	
Athlete	Event	Time	Rank	Time	Rank
Julio Abreu	200 m breaststroke	2:35.22	6	did not advance	
Julio Abreu	200 m butterfly	2:13.54	8	did not advance	
Julio Abreu	400 m individual medley	4:46.69	5	did not advance	

== See also ==
- Paraguay at the 1975 Pan American Games
