= Paraguay at the 1968 Summer Olympics =

- IOC code: PAR
- NOC: Comité Olímpico Paraguayo

in Mexico City
- Competitors: 1 (1 man and 0 women) in 1 sport
- Flag bearer: Rodolfo da Ponte
- Medals: Gold 0 Silver 0 Bronze 0 Total 0

Summer Olympics appearances (overview)
- 1968; 1972; 1976; 1980; 1984; 1988; 1992; 1996; 2000; 2004; 2008; 2012; 2016; 2020; 2024

Paraguay at the 1968 Summer Olympics in Mexico City, Mexico was the nation's first appearance out of sixteen editions at the time at the Summer Olympic Games. One competitor, Rodolfo da Ponte, took part in the individual foil fencing.

== Fencing ==
Ranks given are within the group.

Fencer	Event	First round		Quarterfinals		Semifinals		Final	
Fencer	Event	Result	Rank	Result	Rank	Result	Rank	Result	Rank
Rodolfo da Ponte	Foil	0–5	6	did not advance					

== See also ==
- Paraguay at the 1967 Pan American Games
