= Paraguay at the 1972 Summer Olympics =

- IOC code: PAR
- NOC: Comité Olímpico Paraguayo

in Munich
- Competitors: 3 (3 men and 0 women) in 2 sports
- Flag bearer: Arnulfo Becker
- Medals: Gold 0 Silver 0 Bronze 0 Total 0

Summer Olympics appearances (overview)
- 1968; 1972; 1976; 1980; 1984; 1988; 1992; 1996; 2000; 2004; 2008; 2012; 2016; 2020; 2024

Paraguay competed at the 1972 Summer Olympics in Munich, West Germany. Three competitors, all men, took part in three events in two sports.

== Athletics ==
Key

- Note–Ranks given for track events are within the athlete's heat only
- Q = Qualified for the next round
- q = Qualified for the next round as a fastest loser or, in field events, by position without achieving the qualifying target
- NR = National record
- N/A = Round not applicable for the event
- Bye = Athlete not required to compete in round

Men
Track & road events

Athlete	Event	Heat		Quarterfinal		Semifinal		Final	
Athlete	Event	Result	Rank	Result	Rank	Result	Rank	Result	Rank
Angel Guerreros	100 m	11.12	7	did not advance					
Francisco Rojas Soto	400 m	47.46	6	did not advance					

== Shooting ==
One male shooter represented Paraguay in 1972.

Athlete	Event	Final	
Athlete	Event	Points	Rank
Reinaldo Ramírez	300 m free rifle, three positions	1030	33

== See also ==
- Paraguay at the 1971 Pan American Games
