= Paraguay at the 1996 Summer Olympics =

- IOC code: PAR
- NOC: Comité Olímpico Paraguayo
- Website: www.cop.org.py (in Spanish)

in Atlanta
- Competitors: 7 (6 men and 1 woman) in 5 sports
- Flag bearer: Ramón Jiménez Gaona
- Medals: Gold 0 Silver 0 Bronze 0 Total 0

Summer Olympics appearances (overview)
- 1968; 1972; 1976; 1980; 1984; 1988; 1992; 1996; 2000; 2004; 2008; 2012; 2016; 2020; 2024

Paraguay competed at the 1996 Summer Olympics in Atlanta, United States. Seven competitors, six men and one woman, took part in seven events in five sports.

== Athletics ==
Key

- Note–Ranks given for track events are within the athlete's heat only
- Q = Qualified for the next round
- q = Qualified for the next round as a fastest loser or, in field events, by position without achieving the qualifying target
- NR = National record
- N/A = Round not applicable for the event
- Bye = Athlete not required to compete in round

Men
Field

Athlete	Event	Qualification		Final	
Athlete	Event	Distance	Position	Distance	Position
Ramón Jiménez Gaona	Discus throw	61.36	16	did not advance	
Edgar Baumann	Javelin throw	77.74	20	did not advance	

== Fencing ==
One male fencer represented Paraguay in 1996.

Athlete	Event	Round of 64	Round of 32	Round of 16	Quarterfinals	Semifinals	Final / Bronze match	
Athlete	Event	Opposition Score	Opposition Score	Opposition Score	Opposition Score	Opposition Score	Opposition Score	Rank
Bruno Cornet	Sabre	Olech (POL); L 2–15	did not advance					40T

== Judo ==
Athlete	Weight Class	Round of 64	Round of 32	Round of 16	Quarterfinals	Semifinals	Final / Bronze match	
Athlete	Weight Class	Opposition Score	Opposition Score	Opposition Score	Opposition Score	Opposition Score	Opposition Score	Rank
Jorge Pacce	71 kg	n/a	Abanoz (TUR); L	did not advance				21T

== Sailing ==
Open

Athlete	Event	Race											Net points	Final rank
Athlete	Event	1	2	3	4	5	6	7	8	9	10	11	Net points	Final rank
Constantino Scarpetta	Laser	51	46	53	~~DNF~~	51	~~DNF~~	DSQ	46	51	52	43	450.0	53

== Swimming ==
Athlete	Event	Heat		Final	
Athlete	Event	Time	Rank	Time	Rank
Alfredo Carrillo	Men's 50 m freestyle	24.91	57	did not advance	
Verónica Prono	Women's 50 m freestyle	28.40	49	did not advance	

== See also ==
- Paraguay at the 1995 Pan American Games
