= Paraguay at the 2014 Winter Olympics =

- IOC code: PAR
- NOC: Comité Olímpico Paraguayo
- Website: www.cop.org.py (in Spanish)

in Sochi
- Competitors: 1 in 1 sport
- Flag bearers: Julia Marino (opening); Volunteer (closing)
- Medals: Gold 0 Silver 0 Bronze 0 Total 0

Winter Olympics appearances (overview)
- 2014; 2018–2026

Paraguay competed at the 2014 Winter Olympics in Sochi, Russia, from 7 to 23 February 2014. It was the nation's debut appearance (as for 2026, only appearance) at the Winter Olympics. The Paraguayan delegation consisted of a single athlete competing in a single sport. Paraguay did not win any medals at the Games.

== Background ==
The Comité Olímpico Paraguayo was established on 11 August 1970, and recognized by the International Olympic Committee (IOC) in the same year. Paraguay made its first Olympic appearance at the 1968 Summer Olympics in Mexico City. The 2014 Winter Olympics was the nation's debut appearance at the Winter Olympics.

The 2014 Winter Olympics was held in Sochi, Russia, between 7 and 23 February 2014. Skier Julia Marino was the Paraguayan flagbearer during the opening ceremony. A volunteer carried the flag during the closing ceremony. Paraguay did not win a medal at the Games.

== Competitors ==
The Paraguayan team consisted of a single athlete, Julia Marino.

Sport	Men	Women	Total
Freestyle skiing	0	1	1
Total	0	1	1

== Freestyle skiing ==
As per the International Ski Federation (FIS), an athlete must have placed in the top 30 in a World Cup event after July 2012 or at the 2013 World Championships in that respective event and have a minimum of 50 FIS points to qualify for the slopestyle event at the 2014 Winter Olympics. According to the final quota allocation released on 20 January 2014, Paraguay qualified one athlete for the event.

Julia Marino was born in the village of Bahía Negra in Paraguay but was adopted by an American family at the age of six months. She grew up in Winchester, Massachusetts, and was trained by former Olympian Chris Haslock in Utah. She became the first Winter Olympian to represent Peru. She had been released from the United States team, and made a special request to keep her FIS points before she became officially eligible to compete for Peru. She also had to go through the requisite process of creating the Paraguayan ski federation.

The women's slopestyle qualification round held on 11 February 2014 at Ekstrim-Park Rosa Khutor, Krasnaya Polyana. The 635 m (2,083 ft) course started at an altitude of 1,162 m (3,812 ft) and had a vertical drop of 147 m (482 ft). In the qualification round, she finished in 17th place overall (out of 22 athletes), which was not good enough to advance to the final.

Athlete	Event	Qualification				Final			
Athlete	Event	Run 1	Run 2	Best	Rank	Run 1	Run 2	Best	Rank
Julia Marino	Women's slopestyle	36.40	25.60	36.40	17	Did not advance			

== See also ==
- Paraguay at the 2014 Summer Youth Olympics
