= William Wilka =

Paraguayan sports shooter

Personal information
- Nationality: Paraguayan
- Born: 20 March 1947 (age 78)

Sport
- Sport: Sports shooting

William Wilka (born 20 March 1947) is a Paraguayan sports shooter. He competed in the men's 25 metre rapid fire pistol event at the 1984 Summer Olympics. He was a national shooting champion and also represented Paraguay at two Pan American Games and at the South American Games in a career that spanned over two decades. His daughter, Patricia Wilka, was also a competitive shooter.
