= Paraguay at the 1992 Summer Olympics =

- IOC code: PAR
- NOC: Comité Olímpico Paraguayo

in Barcelona
- Competitors: 27 (24 men, 3 women) in 6 sports
- Flag bearer: Ramón Jiménez Gaona
- Medals: Gold 0 Silver 0 Bronze 0 Total 0

Summer Olympics appearances (overview)
- 1968; 1972; 1976; 1980; 1984; 1988; 1992; 1996; 2000; 2004; 2008; 2012; 2016; 2020; 2024; 2028

Paraguay competed at the 1992 Summer Olympics in Barcelona, Spain. Its contingent of 27 competitors, including 24 men and 3 women, took part in 12 events in 6 sports.

== Competitors ==
The following is the list of number of competitors in the Games.

Sport	Men	Women	Total
Athletics	2	1	3
Fencing	2	0	2
Football	17	–	17
Judo	1	0	1
Swimming	2	0	2
Tennis	0	2	2
Total	24	3	27

== Athletics ==
Key

- Note–Ranks given for track events are within the athlete's heat only
- Q = Qualified for the next round
- q = Qualified for the next round as a fastest loser or, in field events, by position without achieving the qualifying target
- NR = National record
- N/A = Round not applicable for the event
- Bye = Athlete not required to compete in round

Men
Field

Athlete	Event	Qualification		Final	
Athlete	Event	Distance	Position	Distance	Position
Ramón Jiménez Gaona	Discus throw	59.78	16	did not advance	
Nery Kennedy	Javelin throw	65.00	30	did not advance	

Women
Field

Athlete	Event	Qualification		Final	
Athlete	Event	Distance	Position	Distance	Position
Natalia Toledo	Long jump	5.73	27	did not advance	

== Fencing ==
Two male fencers represented Paraguay in 1992.

Ranks given are within the group.

Fencer	Event	First round		Quarterfinals		Semifinals		Final	
Fencer	Event	Result	Rank	Result	Rank	Result	Rank	Result	Rank
Enzo da Ponte	Foil	1–5	6	Did not advance					
José Marcelo Álvarez	Foil	0–6	7	Did not advance					
Enzo da Ponte	Épée	0–6	7	Did not advance					
José Marcelo Álvarez	Épée	0–6	7	Did not advance					

== Football ==
=== Men's team competition ===
- Preliminary round

=== Group C ===
Team	Pld	W	D	L	GF	GA	GD	Pts
Sweden	3	1	2	0	5	1	+4	4
Paraguay	3	1	2	0	3	1	+2	4
South Korea	3	0	3	0	2	2	0	3
Morocco	3	0	1	2	2	8	−6	1

July 26, 1992
21:00

Sweden	0 – 0	Paraguay
	Report

Estadi de Sarrià, Barcelona
Attendance: 15.000
Referee: Spassov (BUL)

July 28, 1992
21:00

Paraguay	0 – 0	South Korea
	Report

Estadio Luis Casanova, Valencia
Attendance: 2.000
Referee: Sendid (ALG)

July 30, 1992
21:00

Paraguay	3 – 1	Morocco
Arce 43'; Caballero 57'; Gamarra 70'	Report	Naybet 87'

Estadio Luis Casanova, Valencia
Attendance: 2.000
Referee: Merk (GER)

=== Quarterfinals ===
August 2, 1992
19:00

Paraguay	2 – 4 (AET)	Ghana
Acheampong 78' (o.g.); Campos 81'	Report	Ayew 17', 55', 121'; Rahman 114'

Estadio La Romareda, Zaragoza
Attendance: 10.000
Referee: Bujsaim (UAE)
- Team roster

- ( 1) Ruben Ruiz Diaz
- ( 2) Andres Duarte
- ( 3) Osvaldo Peralta
- ( 4) Juan Ramon Jara
- ( 5) Celso Ayala
- ( 6) Carlos Gamarra
- ( 7) Francisco Ferreira
- ( 8) Hugo Sosa
- ( 9) Arsenio Benitez
- (10) Gustavo Neffa
- (11) Julio César Yegros
- (12) César Velázquez
- (13) Juan Marecos
- (14) Ricardo Sanabria
- (15) Guido Alvarenga
- (16) Francisco Arce
- (17) Héctor Sosa
- (18) Charles Bourdier
- (19) Mauro Caballero
- (20) Jorge Luis Campos

- Head coach: Sergio Markarián

== Judo ==
Athlete	Weight class	Round of 64	Round of 32	Round of 16	Quarterfinals	Semifinals	Final / Bronze match	
Athlete	Weight class	Opposition Score	Opposition Score	Opposition Score	Opposition Score	Opposition Score	Opposition Score	Rank
Vicente Cespedes	Half lightweight	Almeida (POR); L	Did not advance					36T

== Swimming ==
Athlete	Event	Heat		Final	
Athlete	Event	Time	Rank	Time	Rank
Marcos Prono	100 m breaststroke	1:02.72	47	did not advance	
Marcos Prono	200 m breaststroke	2:15.25	39	did not advance	
Alan Espínola	100 m butterfly	1:01.38	64	did not advance	
Alan Espínola	200 m butterfly	2:11.88	42	did not advance	

== Tennis ==
Player	Event	Round of 32	Round of 16	Quarterfinals	Semifinals	Finals	Rank
Player	Event	Opposition Score	Opposition Score	Opposition Score	Opposition Score	Opposition Score	Rank
Rossana de los Ríos; Larissa Schaerer	Women's doubles	Demongeot & Tauziat (FRA); L 1–6, 6–7	Did not advance				17T

== See also ==
- Paraguay at the 1991 Pan American Games
