= Paraguay at the 2008 Summer Olympics =

- IOC code: PAR
- NOC: Comité Olímpico Paraguayo
- Website: www.cop.org.py (in Spanish)

in Beijing
- Competitors: 7 in 5 sports
- Flag bearer: Víctor Fatecha
- Medals: Gold 0 Silver 0 Bronze 0 Total 0

Summer Olympics appearances (overview)
- 1968; 1972; 1976; 1980; 1984; 1988; 1992; 1996; 2000; 2004; 2008; 2012; 2016; 2020; 2024; 2028

Paraguay competed at the 2008 Summer Olympics in Beijing, China.

== Athletics ==
Key

- Note–Ranks given for track events are within the athlete's heat only
- Q = Qualified for the next round
- q = Qualified for the next round as a fastest loser or, in field events, by position without achieving the qualifying target
- NR = National record
- N/A = Round not applicable for the event
- Bye = Athlete not required to compete in round

Men

Athlete	Event	Qualification		Final	
Athlete	Event	Distance	Position	Distance	Position
Víctor Fatecha	Javelin throw	71.58	30	Did not advance	

Women

Athlete	Event	Qualification		Final	
Athlete	Event	Distance	Position	Distance	Position
Leryn Franco	Javelin throw	45.34	51	Did not advance	

== Sailing ==
Women

Athlete	Event	Race											Net points	Final rank
Athlete	Event	1	2	3	4	5	6	7	8	9	10	M*	Net points	Final rank
Florencia Cerutti	Laser Radial	~~28~~	2	23	23	26	25	17	7	19	CAN	EL	125	22

M = Medal race; EL = Eliminated – did not advance into the medal race; CAN = Race cancelled;

== Shooting ==
Women

Athlete	Event	Qualification		Final	
Athlete	Event	Points	Rank	Points	Rank
Patricia Wilka	10 m air pistol	208	44	Did not advance	

== Swimming ==
Men

Athlete	Event	Heat		Semifinal		Final	
Athlete	Event	Time	Rank	Time	Rank	Time	Rank
Genaro Prono	100 m breaststroke	1:02.32 NR	41	Did not advance			

Women

Athlete	Event	Heat		Semifinal		Final	
Athlete	Event	Time	Rank	Time	Rank	Time	Rank
María Virginia Báez	100 m backstroke	1:05.39 NR	46	Did not advance			

== Table tennis ==
Athlete	Event	Preliminary round	Round 1	Round 2	Round 3	Round 4	Quarterfinals	Semifinals	Final / BM	
Athlete	Event	Opposition Result	Opposition Result	Opposition Result	Opposition Result	Opposition Result	Opposition Result	Opposition Result	Opposition Result	Rank
Marcelo Aguirre	Men's singles	Jang S-M (PRK); L 0–4	Did not advance							

== See also ==
- Paraguay at the 2007 Pan American Games
