= Paraguay at the 2012 Summer Olympics =

- IOC code: PAR
- NOC: Comité Olímpico Paraguayo
- Website: www.cop.org.py (in Spanish)

in London
- Competitors: 8 in 6 sports
- Flag bearer: Benjamin Hockin
- Medals: Gold 0 Silver 0 Bronze 0 Total 0

Summer Olympics appearances (overview)
- 1968; 1972; 1976; 1980; 1984; 1988; 1992; 1996; 2000; 2004; 2008; 2012; 2016; 2020; 2024

Paraguay competed at the 2012 Summer Olympics in London, from 27 July to 12 August 2012. This was the nation's eleventh appearance at the Olympics, except the 1980 Summer Olympics in Moscow because of its partial support to the United States boycott.

Comité Olímpico Paraguayo sent a total of 8 athletes, an equal share between men and women, to compete in 6 sports. Javelin thrower Leryn Franco, who competed at her third Olympics, was considered one of the most beautiful women in these Olympic Games, because of her professional career as a model and a beauty pageant contestant. Freestyle swimmer Benjamin Hockin, who played for Great Britain in Beijing, and embraced British roots to represent his mother's home land, became the nation's flag bearer at the opening ceremony. Paraguay, however, failed to win a single Olympic medal in London, since the 2004 Summer Olympics in Athens, where the men's football team won the silver.

== Athletics ==
Paraguayan athletes have so far achieved qualifying standards in the following athletics events (up to a maximum of 3 athletes in each event at the 'A' Standard, and 1 at the 'B' Standard):

Key

- Note – Ranks given for track events are within the athlete's heat only
- Q = Qualified for the next round
- q = Qualified for the next round as a fastest loser or, in field events, by position without achieving the qualifying target
- NR = National record
- N/A = Round not applicable for the event
- Bye = Athlete not required to compete in round

Men

Athlete	Event	Heat		Semifinal		Final	
Athlete	Event	Result	Rank	Result	Rank	Result	Rank
Augusto Stanley	400 m	47.21	6	Did not advance			

Women

Athlete	Event	Qualification		Final	
Athlete	Event	Distance	Position	Distance	Position
Leryn Franco	Javelin throw	51.45	34	Did not advance	

== Judo ==
Athlete	Event	Round of 64	Round of 32	Round of 16	Quarterfinals	Semifinals	Repechage	Final / BM	
Athlete	Event	Opposition Result	Opposition Result	Opposition Result	Opposition Result	Opposition Result	Opposition Result	Opposition Result	Rank
Abraham Acevedo	Men's −66 kg	Bye	García (AND); L 0001–0020	Did not advance					

== Rowing ==
Paraguay has qualified the following boat by invitation.

Women

Athlete	Event	Heats		Repechage		Quarterfinals		Semifinals		Final	
Athlete	Event	Time	Rank	Time	Rank	Time	Rank	Time	Rank	Time	Rank
Gabriela Mosqueira	Single sculls	7:52.07	3 QF	Bye		8:14.36	5 SC/D	8:10.15	6 FD	8:34.51	20

Qualification Legend: FA=Final A (medal); FB=Final B (non-medal); FC=Final C (non-medal); FD=Final D (non-medal); FE=Final E (non-medal); FF=Final F (non-medal); SA/B=Semifinals A/B; SC/D=Semifinals C/D; SE/F=Semifinals E/F; QF=Quarterfinals; R=Repechage

== Swimming ==
Paraguayan swimmers have so far achieved qualifying standards in the following events (up to a maximum of 2 swimmers in each event at the Olympic Qualifying Time (OQT), and 1 at the Olympic Selection Time (OST)):

Men

Athlete	Event	Heat		Semifinal		Final	
Athlete	Event	Time	Rank	Time	Rank	Time	Rank
Benjamin Hockin	100 m freestyle	50.12	32	Did not advance			
Benjamin Hockin	200 m freestyle	1:48.91	29	Did not advance			
Benjamin Hockin	100 m butterfly	53.65	35	Did not advance			

Women

Athlete	Event	Heat		Semifinal		Final	
Athlete	Event	Time	Rank	Time	Rank	Time	Rank
Karen Riveros	100 m freestyle	59.86	41	Did not advance			

== Table tennis ==
Paraguay has so far qualified one table tennis player.

Athlete	Event	Preliminary round	Round 1	Round 2	Round 3	Round 4	Quarterfinals	Semifinals	Final / BM	
Athlete	Event	Opposition Result	Opposition Result	Opposition Result	Opposition Result	Opposition Result	Opposition Result	Opposition Result	Opposition Result	Rank
Marcelo Aguirre	Men's singles	Bye	Didukh (UKR); L 3–4	Did not advance						

== Tennis ==
Athlete	Event	Round of 64	Round of 32	Round of 16	Quarterfinals	Semifinals	Final / BM	
Athlete	Event	Opposition Score	Opposition Score	Opposition Score	Opposition Score	Opposition Score	Opposition Score	Rank
Verónica Cepede Royg	Women's singles	Lepchenko (USA); L 5–7, 7–6^{(8–6)}, 2–6	Did not advance					

== See also ==
- Paraguay at the 2011 Pan American Games
