= Mariana Canillas =

Paraguayan athlete

Personal information
- Nationality: Paraguayan
- Born: 28 December 1984 (age 41)

Sport
- Sport: Athletics
- Event: Discus throw
Medal record
Women's athletics
Representing Paraguay
South American University Games
Gold medal – first place	2006 Curitiba	Discus throw
Bronze medal – third place	2006 Curitiba	Shot put

Mariana Canillas (born 28 December 1984) is a Paraguayan athlete. She competed in the women's discus throw at the 2000 Summer Olympics.

Canillas was the second ever Paraguayan woman to qualify for athletics at the Olympics. Aged only 15 years old, Canillas finished last in the Olympic discus competition, and it was noted that her mark of 32.31 m was over 19 metres shorter than the second-to-last finisher and 118 feet (36 m) behind the winner. S

The following year, Canillas set the Paraguayan U18 record in the hammer throw, throwing 43.35 metres. Her mark stood for eight years until it was broken by Paola Miranda in 2009.

Canillas competed representing the athletics division of Deportivo San José. In July 2004, she broke her own Paraguayan senior national record in the hammer throw, throwing 43.58 metres to break her own 43.35 m previous record. In July 2005, she improved her record again from 46.06 m to 48.90 m.

Canillas qualified for the 2006 South American University Games in Curitiba, Brazil in both the shot put and discus throw. She won the gold medal in the discus and bronze in the shot put.
