= Pedro Benítez (footballer, born 1981) =

Paraguayan footballer

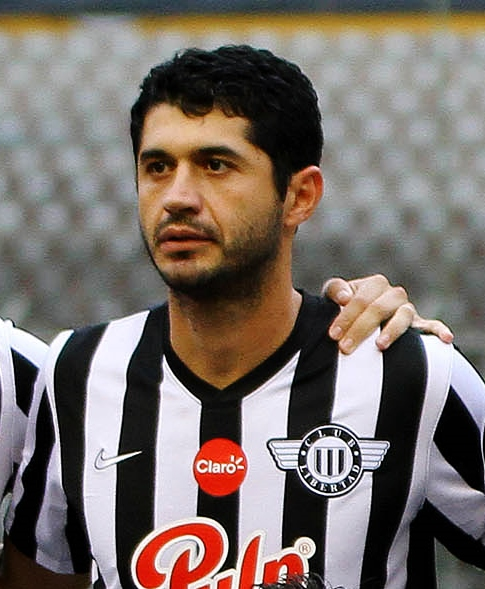

Personal information
- Date of birth: 23 March 1981 (age 45)
- Place of birth: San Lorenzo, Paraguay
- Height: 1.88 m (6 ft 2 in)
- Position: Centre back

Team information
- Current team: Deportivo Capiatá
- Number: 26

Senior career*
Years	Team	Apps	(Gls)
1998–1999	Sportivo San Lorenzo	15	(1)
2000–2001	Sportivo Luqueño	26	(2)
2002–2003	Olimpia Asunción	36	(2)
2004–2006	Cerro Porteño	55	(11)
2004–2005	→ Shakhtar Donetsk	0	(0)
2007–2008	Libertad	44	(6)
2008–2009	Tigres	37	(2)
2009–2010	Atlético Mineiro	13	(0)
2010–2012	Cerro Porteño	101	(12)
2013–2017	Libertad	106	(4)
2017	Rubio Ñu	14	(1)
2018–	Deportivo Capiatá	16	(2)

International career
2001	Paraguay U20	7	(0)
2004	Paraguay U23		
2004–2010	Paraguay	12	(1)
- * Club domestic league appearances and goals as of 3 June 2018

Olympic medal record

Men's Football
Silver medal – second place	2004 Athens	Team competition

Pedro Juan Benítez Domínguez (born 23 March 1981) is a Paraguayan former footballer. He last played for Deportivo Capiatá.

Benítez was part of the silver medal-winning Paraguayan football team at the 2004 Summer Olympics, who achieved a quarter-final place with two victories in the qualifying round, and, having finished second in the league, beat South Korea in the quarter-finals, and Iraq in the semi-finals, before losing to Argentina in the final.

During his career Benítez played for Sportivo San Lorenzo, Sportivo Luqueño, Olimpia, Cerro Porteño, Libertad, FC Shakhtar Donetsk, Tigres and Atlético Mineiro.

He has also represented the Paraguay national football team 12 times since 2004, and he has scored one goal.

== See also ==
- Players and Records in Paraguayan Football
