= Paraguay at the 1988 Summer Olympics =

- IOC code: PAR
- NOC: Comité Olímpico Paraguayo

in Seoul
- Competitors: 10 (10 men and 0 women) in 5 sports
- Flag bearer: Ramón Jiménez Gaona
- Medals: Gold 0 Silver 0 Bronze 0 Total 0

Summer Olympics appearances (overview)
- 1968; 1972; 1976; 1980; 1984; 1988; 1992; 1996; 2000; 2004; 2008; 2012; 2016; 2020; 2024

Paraguay competed at the 1988 Summer Olympics in Seoul, South Korea. Ten competitors, all men, took part in eleven events in five sports.

== Competitors ==
The following is the list of number of competitors in the Games.

Sport	Men	Women	Total
Athletics	3	0	3
Boxing	2	–	2
Fencing	2	0	2
Judo	1	–	1
Tennis	2	0	2
Total	10	0	10

== Athletics ==
Key

- Note–Ranks given for track events are within the athlete's heat only
- Q = Qualified for the next round
- q = Qualified for the next round as a fastest loser or, in field events, by position without achieving the qualifying target
- NR = National record
- N/A = Round not applicable for the event
- Bye = Athlete not required to compete in round

Men
Track & road events

Athlete	Event	Heat		Quarterfinal		Semifinal		Final	
Athlete	Event	Result	Rank	Result	Rank	Result	Rank	Result	Rank
Porfirio Méndez	800 m	1:50.72	6	did not advance					
Ramón López	1500 m	3:53.31	12	—N/a		did not advance			
Ramón López	3000 m steeplechase	8:56.06	9 Q	—N/a		8:52.62 NR	12	did not advance	

Field

Athlete	Event	Qualification		Final	
Athlete	Event	Distance	Position	Distance	Position
Ramón Jiménez Gaona	Discus throw	50.90	24	did not advance	

== Boxing ==
Boxer	Weight class	Round of 32	Round of 16	Quarterfinals	Semifinals	Final / Bronze match	
Boxer	Weight class	Opposition Score	Opposition Score	Opposition Score	Opposition Score	Opposition Score	Rank
Sixto Vera	Flyweight	Bahadur Singh (NEP); L	did not advance				33T
Miguel González	Light-welterweight	bye	Cheney (AUS); L	did not advance			17T

== Fencing ==
Two fencers represented Paraguay in 1988.

Ranks given are within the group.

Fencer	Event	First round		Quarterfinals		Semifinals		Final	
Fencer	Event	Result	Rank	Result	Rank	Result	Rank	Result	Rank
Alfredo Bogarín	Épée	0–5	6	did not advance					
Pedro Cornet	Foil	0–5	6	did not advance					

== Judo ==
Athlete	Weight class	Round of 64	Round of 32	Round of 16	Quarterfinals	Semifinals	Final / Bronze match	
Athlete	Weight class	Opposition Score	Opposition Score	Opposition Score	Opposition Score	Opposition Score	Opposition Score	Rank
Vicente Cespedes	Half lightweight	Bogie (KEN); W	Sarti (SMR); W	Reiter (AUT); L	did not advance			14T

== Tennis ==
Player	Event	Round of 64	Round of 32	Round of 16	Quarterfinals	Semifinals	Finals	Rank
Player	Event	Opposition Score	Opposition Score	Opposition Score	Opposition Score	Opposition Score	Opposition Score	Rank
Victor Caballero	Men's singles	Ali (IND); L 3–6, 4–6, 2–6	did not advance					33T
Hugo Chapacú	Men's singles	Cherkasov (URS); L 0–6, 0–6, 1–6	did not advance					33T
Victor Caballero; Hugo Chapacú	Men's doubles	N/A	Gurr & Tuckniss (ZIM); W 6–4, 3–6, 3–6, 1-6	did not advance				17T

== See also ==
- Paraguay at the 1987 Pan American Games
