= Andrea Prono =

Paraguayan swimmer (born 1984)

Personal information
- Full name: Andrea Prono Sánchez
- National team: Paraguay
- Born: 30 August 1984 (age 41) Asunción, Paraguay
- Height: 1.67 m (5 ft 6 in)
- Weight: 51 kg (112 lb)

Sport
- Sport: Swimming
- Strokes: Backstroke

Andrea Prono Sánchez (born August 30, 1984) is a Paraguayan former swimmer, who specialized in backstroke events. She is a 2000 Olympian and the cousin of Genaro Prono, an elite breaststroke swimmer, who later competed for Paraguay at the 2008 Summer Olympics in Beijing.

Prono competed only in the women's 100 m backstroke at the 2000 Summer Olympics in Sydney. She received a ticket from FINA, under a Universality program, without meeting an entry time. Swimming in heat one, she pulled away from Congo's Monika Bakale by an eight-second advantage to pick up a sixth seed in a lifetime best of 1:08.11. Prono failed to advance into the semifinals, as she placed forty-fifth overall in the prelims.
