= Rodrigo Romero =

Paraguayan footballer (born 1982)

Personal information
- Full name: Rodrigo Nicolás Romero Aranda
- Date of birth: October 8, 1982 (age 44)
- Place of birth: Luque, Paraguay
- Height: 1.90 m (6 ft 3 in)
- Position: Goalkeeper

Youth career
- General Díaz

Senior career*
Years	Team	Apps	(Gls)
- General Díaz
2002	General Caballero ZC		
2002–2003	Sportivo Trinidense		
2004	Nacional		
2005	Sport Colombia	3	(0)
2005	Olimpia	0	(0)
2005	Nacional	0	(0)
2006–2007	Sportivo Trinidense	36	(0)
2008	Olimpia	1	(0)
2008	3 de Febrero	1	(0)
2009	Deportes Concepción	0	(0)
2009	12 de Octubre	3	(0)
2010	Sportivo Trinidense	20	(0)
2011–2012	Deportivo Santaní		
2013	Resistencia		
2014	Cristóbal Colón	–	(–)
2015	29 de Setiembre	–	(–)
2016	Nacional SdG	–	(–)
2017	13 de Junio	–	(–)

International career
2004	Paraguay U23	1	(0)
Medal record
Men's Football
Representing Paraguay
Summer Olympics
Silver medal – second place	2004 Athens	Team
- * Club domestic league appearances and goals

Rodrigo Nicolás Romero Aranda (born 8 October 1982) is a Paraguayan former footballer who played as a goalkeeper. He was part of the silver medal-winning Paraguayan 2004 Olympic football team.

== Club career ==
- (Paraguay) General Díaz
- 2002 (Paraguay) General Caballero ZC
- 2002–2003 (Paraguay) Sportivo Trinidense
- 2004 (Paraguay) Nacional
- 2005 (Paraguay) Sport Colombia
- 2005 (Paraguay) Olimpia
- 2005 (Paraguay) Nacional
- 2006–2007 (Paraguay) Sportivo Trinidense
- 2008 (Paraguay) Olimpia
- 2008 (Paraguay) 3 de Febrero
- 2009 (Chile) Deportes Concepción
- 2009 (Paraguay) 12 de Octubre
- 2010 (Paraguay) Sportivo Trinidense
- 2011–2012 (Paraguay) Deportivo Santaní
- 2013 (Paraguay) Resistencia
- 2014 (Paraguay) Cristóbal Colón
- 2015 (Paraguay) 29 de Setiembre
- 2016 (Paraguay) Nacional de Salto del Guairá
- 2017 (Paraguay) 13 de Junio

== International career ==
On 4 August, before the Summer Olympics began, he played in a preparation game against the Portugal of Cristiano Ronaldo in the city of Algarve, resulting in a 5–0 defeat.
