= CITIC Press Group =

Chinese state-owned publishing house

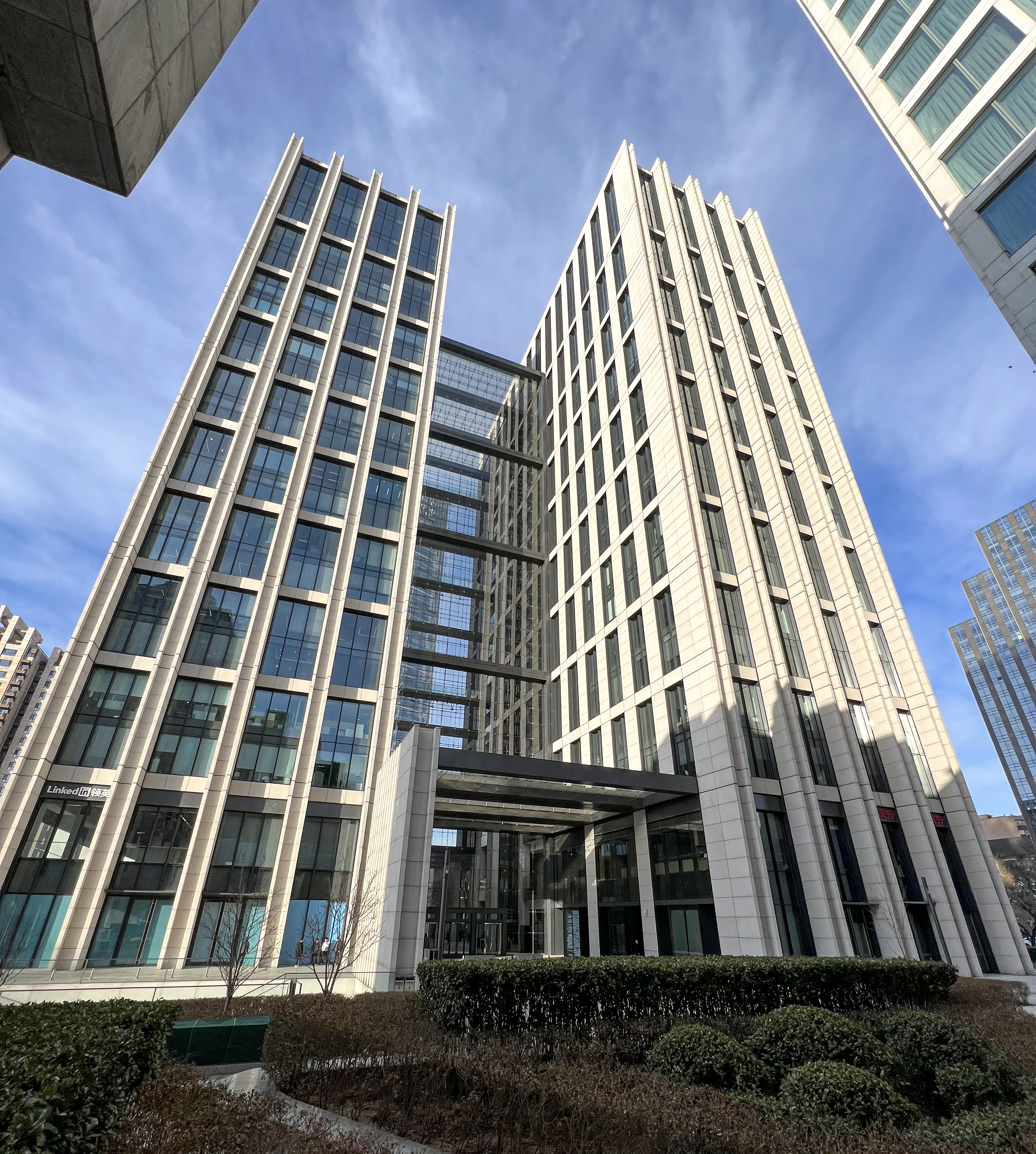
- Jiaming Center, which houses the company
- Type: State-owned enterprise
- Industry: Publishing
- Founded: 2008
- Headquarters: Beijing, China
- Parent: CITIC Group
- Website: www.citicpub.com

CITIC Press Group (Chinese: 中信出版集团), formerly CITIC Publishing Group, is a publishing company founded in 1988 based in Beijing, China. The publisher is a subsidiary of the state-owned CITIC Group. They engage in digital and physical book retail and provide professional education.

== History ==
The company was established in 1988 as China CITIC Press.

In 2001, Wang Bin was hired to run the publishing house.

It was reorganized to CITIC Publishing Group in 2008, and renamed back to CITIC Press in 2013.

Since 2010, the CITIC Press Group has been developing a network of bookstores in major airports and other important buildings in China. By December 2015, the company owned 132 bookstores, and announced its plan to open of a 1,000 more the following year.

In January 2017, the company announced the launch of its content product aggregation platform Citic Academy. In September 2017, the CITIC Press Group signed a deal with Japan's Culture Convenience Club to create a joint cultural content distribution platform.
