= Rocio Rivarola =

Paraguayan rower

Personal information
- Full name: Rocio Rivarola Trappe
- Nationality: Paraguay
- Born: 2 July 1987 (age 38) Asunción, Paraguay
- Height: 1.72 m (5 ft 8 in)
- Weight: 66 kg (146 lb)

Sport
- Sport: rowing
- Club: CNR Mbigua

Rocio Rivarola Trappe (Note: In this Spanish name, the first or paternal surname is Rivarola and the second or maternal family name is Trappe.) (born 2 July 1987 in Asunción) is a female Paraguayan rower. Rivarola qualified for the women's single sculls at the 2004 Summer Olympics in Athens by achieving a fifth spot from FISA Latin American Qualification Regatta in San Salvador, El Salvador with an entry time of 8:25.81. Rowing in the D-Final, Rivarola paddled her stretch against five other women to overhaul an eight-minute barrier for a third-place effort and twenty-first overall in a lifetime best of 7:57.36. Building a historic milestone for Paraguay, Rivarola became the youngest and first-ever female athlete as the nation's flag bearer in the opening ceremony.

== Notes ==
Olympic Games
Preceded by Nery Kennedy	Flagbearer for Paraguay; Athens 2004	Succeeded by Víctor Fatecha
