= Fabrizio Zanotti =

Paraguayan professional golfer (born 1983)

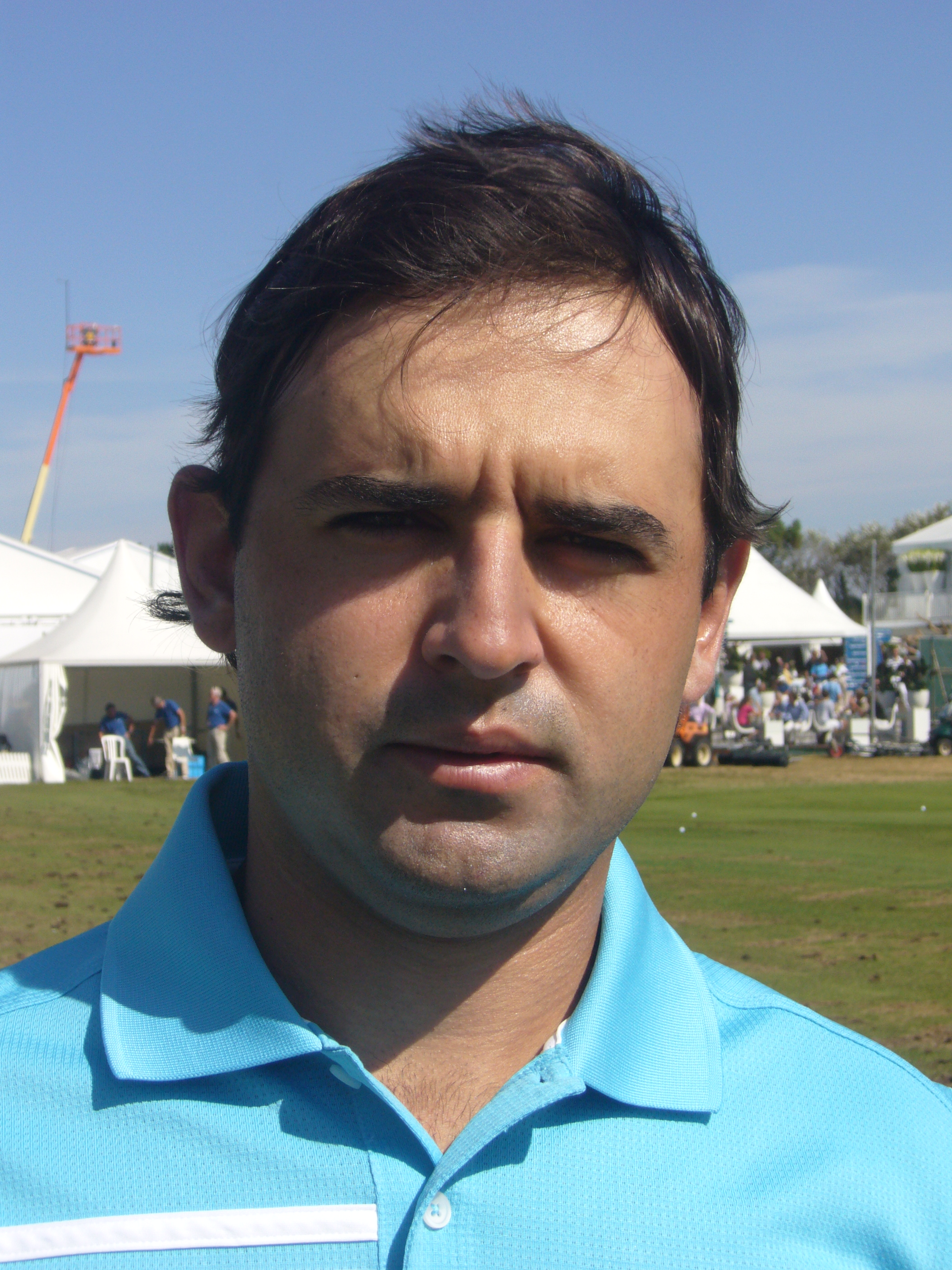

Personal information
- Full name: Arnaldo Fabrizio Zanotti
- Nationality: Paraguay
- Born: 21 May 1983 (age 43) Asunción, Paraguay
- Height: 1.69 m (5 ft 7 in)
- Weight: 70 kg (154 lb)

Career
- Sport: Golf
- Turned professional: 2003
- Current tour: European Tour
- Former tours: Challenge Tour; Tour de las Américas
- Professional wins: 7
- Highest ranking: 76 (5 March 2017)

Number of wins by tour
- European Tour: 2
- Asian Tour: 1
- Challenge Tour: 1
- Other: 3

Best results in major championships
- Masters Tournament: DNP
- PGA Championship: T46: 2014
- U.S. Open: DNP
- The Open Championship: CUT: 2017, 2018, 2022

Achievements and awards
- Tour de las Américas Order of Merit winner: 2006
Medal record
Pan American Games
Gold medal – first place	2019 Lima	Individual
Silver medal – second place	2019 Lima	Mixed team
South American Games
Silver medal – second place	2022 Asunción	Individual
Silver medal – second place	2022 Asunción	Mixed team

Arnaldo Fabrizio Zanotti (born 21 May 1983) is a Paraguayan professional golfer who plays on the European Tour (now known as the DP World Tour). He is the first and only golfer from Paraguay to win a title on the European Tour, claiming victories at the 2014 BMW International Open and the 2017 Maybank Championship.

A prominent figure in South American sports, Zanotti won the individual gold medal at the 2019 Pan American Games in Lima. He is a three-time Olympian, having represented Paraguay at the 2016, 2020, and 2024 Summer Olympics, and was accorded the national honor of serving as his country's official flag bearer during the opening ceremony of the 2020 Tokyo Olympic Games.

== Early life and amateur career ==
Zanotti was born in Asunción, the national capital. He was Paraguay's top-ranked amateur golfer for six straight years.

== Professional career ==
In 2003, Zanotti turned professional. In 2006, Zanotti won the Tour de las Américas Order of Merit with victory at the final event of the season, the Abierto Mexicano Corona. The tournament was also the second event on the 2007 Challenge Tour schedule, and the win enabled him to join the tour for the remainder of the season. He ended the season in 11th place on the Challenge Tour Rankings to graduate to the top-level European Tour for 2008.

In his rookie season on the European Tour, Zanotti finished 153rd on the Order of Merit to lose his place on the tour. However he regained his card for 2009 by finishing 16th at the end-of-season qualifying school. He has kept his card since, with a best finish of 25th on the Race to Dubai in 2017.

Zanotti won his first European Tour event at the 2014 BMW International Open. The win made Zanotti the first Paraguayan to win on the European Tour. During that same season, he also finished third at the Madeira Islands Open - Portugal - BPI, fifth at the Lyoness Open, ninth at the Alstom Open de France and tenth at the BMW Masters. In 2015, he finished second at the British Masters, third at the Open d'Italia, fourth at the KLM Open and seventh at the Nordea Masters.

His second European Tour win came at the Maybank Championship in February 2017. He scored a final round 63, including a birdie-eagle finish, to beat David Lipsky by a stroke. Zanotti had begun the final round six strokes off the lead, but a birdie on the 71st hole sent him to the top of the leaderboard for the first time all week. The win moved Zanotti back inside the top 100 in the world rankings.

At the 2019 Pan American Games, Zanotti won the gold medal in the men's individual competition and the silver medal in the mixed team competition.

Zanotti has also represented Paraguay in the men's individual golf tournament at three consecutive Olympic Games: 2016 Summer Olympics, 2020 Summer Olympics, and 2024 Summer Olympics.

== Professional wins (7) ==
=== European Tour wins (2) ===
No.	Date	Tournament	Winning score	Margin of victory	Runner(s)-up
1	29 Jun 2014	BMW International Open	−19 (72-67-65-65=269)	Playoff	(Spain) Rafa Cabrera-Bello, (France) Grégory Havret, (Sweden) Henrik Stenson
2	12 Feb 2017	Maybank Championship^{1}	−19 (70-69-67-63=269)	1 stroke	(United States) David Lipsky

^{1}Co-sanctioned by the Asian Tour

European Tour playoff record (1–0)

No.	Year	Tournament	Opponents	Result
1	2014	BMW International Open	(Spain) Rafa Cabrera-Bello, (France) Grégory Havret, (Sweden) Henrik Stenson	Won with par on fifth extra hole Cabrera-Bello eliminated by par on fourth hole Havret eliminated by birdie on second hole

=== Challenge Tour wins (1) ===
No.	Date	Tournament	Winning score	Margin of victory	Runner-up
1	10 Dec 2006 (2007 season)	Abierto Mexicano Corona^{1}	−9 (74-67-69-65=275)	1 stroke	(Mexico) Daniel de León

^{1}Co-sanctioned by the Tour de las Américas

=== Tour de las Américas wins (2) ===
No.	Date	Tournament	Winning score	Margin of victory	Runner-up
1	10 Dec 2006	Abierto Mexicano Corona^{1}	−9 (74-67-69-65=275)	1 stroke	(Mexico) Daniel de León
2	6 Nov 2011	Carlos Franco Invitational^{2}	−14 (67-67-65-71=270)	6 strokes	(Argentina) Leandro Marelli

^{1}Co-sanctioned by the Challenge Tour
^{2}Co-sanctioned by the TPG Tour

=== PGA Tour Latinoamérica Developmental Series wins (1) ===
No.	Date	Tournament	Winning score	Margin of victory	Runner-up
1	16 Aug 2015	Abierto de Paraguay Copa NEC	−26 (64-66-68-64=262)	12 strokes	(Argentina) Julio Zapata

=== Other wins (1) ===
No.	Date	Tournament	Winning score	Margin of victory	Runners-up
1	11 Aug 2019	Pan American Games	−15 (64-67-68-70=269)	Playoff	(Chile) Mito Pereira, (Guatemala) José Toledo

Other playoff record (1–0)

No.	Year	Tournament	Opponents	Result
1	2019	Pan American Games	(Chile) Mito Pereira, (Guatemala) José Toledo	Won with birdie on first extra hole

== Results in major championships ==
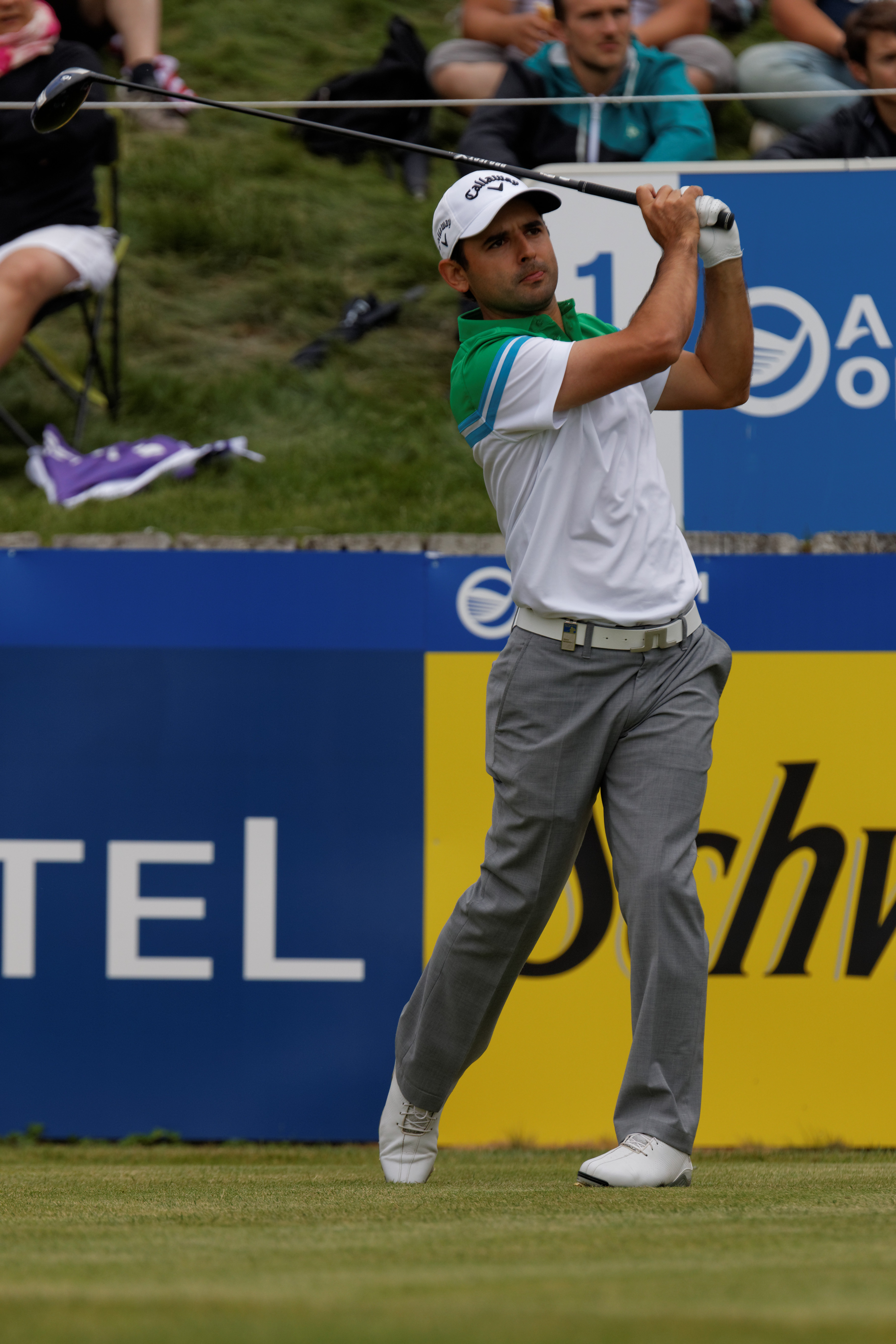
Fabrizio Zanotti

Results not in chronological order in 2020.

Tournament	2014	2015	2016	2017	2018
Masters Tournament					
U.S. Open					
The Open Championship				CUT	CUT
PGA Championship	T46			CUT	

Tournament	2019	2020	2021	2022
Masters Tournament				
U.S. Open				
PGA Championship				
The Open Championship		NT		CUT

Did not play

CUT = missed the half-way cut
"T" indicates a tie for a place
NT = no tournament due to the COVID-19 pandemic

== Results in World Golf Championships ==
Results not in chronological order before 2015.

Tournament	2014	2015	2016	2017
Championship				T12
Match Play				
Invitational	T26			T50
Champions				T50

Did not play

"T" = Tied

== Team appearances ==
Amateur

- Eisenhower Trophy (representing Paraguay): 2000, 2002

Professional

- World Cup (representing Paraguay): 2007

== See also ==
- 2007 Challenge Tour graduates
- 2008 European Tour Qualifying School graduates
- 2013 European Tour Qualifying School graduates

Olympic Games
Preceded by Julieta Granada	Flagbearer for Paraguay (with Verónica Cepede); Tokyo 2020	Succeeded by Fabrizio Zanotti & Alejandra Alonso
Preceded by Fabrizio Zanotti & Verónica Cepede	Flagbearer for Paraguay (with Alejandra Alonso); Paris 2024	Succeeded by Incumbent
