= Godoy =

Godoy is a Spanish surname. It is also a French surname coming from the Normandy region in France. It is derived from the Norman-French first name Gaudi, meaning 'ruler'. Notable people with the surname include:

- Adán Godoy (1936–2026), Chilean footballer
- Alan Godoy (born 2003), Spanish footballer
- Aníbal Godoy (born 1990), Panamanian footballer
- Anna Godoy (born 1992), Spanish triathlete
- Arturo Godoy (1912–1986), Chilean boxer
- Benedicto Godoy (born 1924, date of death unknown), Bolivian footballer
- Caio Godoy (born 1995), Brazilian road cyclist and triathlete
- Carmen Rico Godoy (1939–2001), Spanish writer, journalist and feminist
- Coromoto Godoy (born 1965), Venezuelan diplomat
- Dagoberto Godoy (1893–1960), Chilean pilot
- Daniel Godoy (born 1981), Venezuelan footballer
- David Godoy Bugueño (1944–2007), Chilean chess master
- Diego Godoy (born 1992), Paraguayan footballer
- Enrique Godoy Sayán (1902–1984), Cuban business magnate and banker
- Eric Godoy (born 1987), Chilean footballer
- Érik Godoy (born 1993), Argentine footballer
- Fanny Godoy (born 1998), Paraguayan footballer
- Flávio Godoy (born 1969), Brazilian athlete
- Francesc Godoy (born 1986), Spanish triathlete
- Franco Godoy (born 2000), Argentine footballer
- Gian Godoy (born 1966), Chilean filmmaker, architect and artist
- Gian Godoy (inmate) (died 2002), Belizean diabetic patient
- Giba (born Gilberto Godoy Filho, 1976), Brazilian volleyball player
- Gina Godoy (born 1962), Ecuadorian politician
- Gonzalo Godoy (born 1988), Uruguayan footballer
- Hernán Godoy (1941–2025), Chilean footballer and manager
- Huber Godoy (born 1998), Cuban artistic gymnast
- Isabel Godoy (born 1967), Chilean activist and politician
- Iñaki Godoy (born 2003), Mexican actor
- Joaquin Godoy (1927–2013), Cuban rower
- Jorge Godoy (born 1946), Argentine admiral
- Jorge Godoy Cárdenas (born 1954), Mexican politician
- José Godoy (born 1994), Venezuelan baseball player
- José Carlos Godoy (1911–1988), Peruvian basketball player
- Juan Godoy (1800–1842), Chilean miner
- Juan Esteban Godoy (born 1982), Paraguayan footballer
- Julio César Godoy Toscano (born 1965), Mexican businessman, politician and fugitive
- Kenny Godoy, Honduran judoka
- Laura Godoy (born 1988), Guatemalan volleyball player, model and beauty pageant titleholder
- Leandro Godoy (born 1994), Argentine footballer
- Leonardo Godoy (born 1995), Argentine footballer
- Leonel Godoy Rangel (born 1950), Mexican politician
- Lucas Godoy (born 1982), Argentine politician
- Lucila Godoy Alcayaga (1889–1957), known by her pseudonym Gabriela Mistral, Chilean poet, diplomat, educator and humanist
- Lucio Godoy (born 1958), Spanish-Argentine film composer and music producer
- Luis Godoy (boxer) (born 1952), Colombian boxer
- Luis Godoy (footballer) (born 1978), Chilean footballer
- Luis Godoy Gómez (1928–2016), Chilean politician
- Manuel Godoy (1767–1851), politician, Prime Minister of Spain
  - Manuel de Godoy, 2nd Prince di Bassano (1805–1871), Spanish aristocrat, son of Manuel Godoy
    - Matilde de Godoy di Bassano, 4th Countess of Castillo Fiel (1830–1901), Spanish-Italian aristocrat, daughter of Manuel Godoy, 2nd Prince di Bassano
    - Josefa de Godoy di Bassano, 2nd Viscountess of Rocafuerte (1834–1882), Spanish-Italian aristocrat, daughter of Manuel Godoy, 2nd Prince di Bassano
    - Manuel de Godoy di Bassano, 3rd Prince Godoy di Bassano (1835–1896), Spanish-Italian aristocrat, son of Manuel Godoy, 2nd Prince di Bassano
- Maria Aparecida Godoy (born 1945), also known as Cida Godoy, Brazilian writer and comic artist
- María Luisa Godoy (born 1980), Chilean journalist and presenter
- Matías Godoy (born 2002), Argentine footballer
- Mauricio Godoy (born 1997), Chilean footballer
- Mercedes Godoy (1890–1932), Mexican socialite in the United States, author and singer
- Miguel Godoy (footballer) (born 1983), Paraguayan footballer
- Miguel Godoy (basketball) (1907–2002), Peruvian basketball player
- Mónica Godoy (born 1976), Chilean actress
- Pablo Godoy (born 1984), Paraguayan football player and manager
- Pedro de Godoy (1599–1677), Spanish catholic bishop and theologian
- Philippe Godoy (born 1971), French footballer
- Rafael Godoy (1907–1973), Colombian composer
- Rodrigo Godoy (Argentine footballer) (born 1989), Argentine footballer
- Rodrigo Godoy (Chilean footballer) (born 2005), Chilean footballer
- Rosa Godoy (born 1982), Argentine long-distance runner
- Santiago Godoy (born 2001), Argentine footballer
- Scarlett O'Phelan Godoy (born 1951), Peruvian historian and professor
- Sergio Godoy (Argentine cyclist) (born 1988)
- Tomás Godoy Cruz (1791–1852), Argentine statesman and businessman
- Virgilio Godoy (1934–2016), Nicaraguan politician
- Yonder Godoy (born 1993), Venezuelan racing cyclist

== See also ==
- Godøy, an island in Giske kommune at the west coast of Norway
- Godoi (disambiguation)
- Godoy Cruz (disambiguation)
- Joaquim Floriano de Godóy (1826–1907), Brazilian doctor and politician
- Palace of Marqués de Grimaldi, or Palacio de Godoy (Spanish for Godoy Palace)
