= 2004 CONMEBOL Pre-Olympic Tournament squads =

The 2004 CONMEBOL Pre-Olympic Tournament was an international football tournament held in Chile from 7 to 25 January 2004. The ten national teams involved in the tournament were required to register a squad of 20 players, of which two had to be goalkeepers (FIFA Regulations Article 25). Only players in these squads are eligible to take part in the tournament. The tournament exclusively required players to be born on or after 1 January 1981 to be eligible (CONMEBOL Regulations Article 2.3).

Each national team had to submit its roster of 20 players to the CONMEBOL Organizing Committee by 2 January 2004, five days before the start of the tournament (CONMEBOL Regulations Articles 2.1). Players who had participated in a previous Olympic Tournament, either in the preliminary competition or the final competition, were eligible to take part in this tournament. (CONMEBOL Regulations Article 2.4).

The age listed for each player is as of 7 January 2004, the first day of the tournament. A flag is included for coaches who are of a different nationality than their own national team. Players name marked in bold have been capped at full international level.

== Group A ==
=== Chile ===
Chile announced a 22-man preliminary list on 27 December 2003. The final squad of 20 players was announced on 2 January 2004, with defender Adán Vergara and forward Paulo Pérez being ruled out from the preliminary list.

Players such as Mauricio Pinilla (Chievo), Waldo Ponce (VfL Wolfsburg), Luis Jiménez (Ternana) and Jaime Valdés (Bari) were not included due to injuries or because their clubs did not release them.

Head coach: Juvenal Olmos

No.	Pos.	Player	Date of birth (age)	Club
1	GK	**Johnny Herrera**	9 May 1981 (aged 22)	(Football Federation of Chile) Universidad de Chile
2	DF	José Contreras	23 March 1982 (aged 21)	(Football Federation of Chile) Santiago Wanderers
3	DF	Luis Oyarzún	24 April 1982 (aged 21)	(Football Federation of Chile) Santiago Wanderers
4	DF	**Ismael Fuentes**	4 August 1981 (aged 22)	(Football Federation of Chile) Rangers
5	DF	**Miguel Riffo** (captain)	21 June 1981 (aged 22)	(Football Federation of Chile) Colo-Colo
6	MF	Rubén Bascuñán	23 February 1982 (aged 21)	(Football Federation of Chile) Colo-Colo
7	FW	**José Luis Villanueva**	5 November 1981 (aged 22)	(Football Federation of Chile) Palestino
8	MF	**Rodrigo Millar**	3 November 1981 (aged 22)	(Football Federation of Chile) Huachipato
9	FW	Mario Cáceres	17 March 1981 (aged 22)	(Football Federation of Chile) Colo-Colo
11	MF	**Mark González**	10 July 1984 (aged 19)	(Football Federation of Chile) Universidad Católica
12	GK	**Claudio Bravo**	13 April 1983 (aged 20)	(Football Federation of Chile) Colo-Colo
13	DF	Jorge Carrasco	1 February 1982 (aged 21)	(Football Federation of Chile) Audax Italiano
14	DF	Miguel Aceval	8 January 1983 (aged 20)	(Football Federation of Chile) Colo-Colo
15	MF	**Braulio Leal**	22 November 1981 (aged 22)	(Football Federation of Chile) Colo-Colo
16	MF	**Gonzalo Fierro**	21 March 1983 (aged 20)	(Football Federation of Chile) Colo-Colo
17	FW	**Humberto Suazo**	10 May 1981 (aged 22)	(Football Federation of Chile) Audax Italiano
18	MF	**Luis Pedro Figueroa**	14 May 1983 (aged 20)	(Football Federation of Chile) Universidad de Concepción
19	FW	**Jean Beausejour**	1 June 1984 (aged 19)	(Football Federation of Chile) Universidad Católica
21	MF	**Jorge Valdivia**	19 October 1983 (aged 20)	(Football Federation of Chile) Colo-Colo
22	FW	**Joel Soto**	9 April 1982 (aged 21)	(Mexican Football Federation) Chiapas

=== Brazil ===
Brazil announced a 17-man preliminary list on 8 December 2003. The final squad of 20 players was completed on 19 December 2023, with defender Adriano being replaced by Rodolfo due to an injury and forward Nenê being ruled out as he was not released by his club Mallorca. Subsequently, defender Luisão was not released by his club Benfica and was replaced by Adaílton.

Kaká (Milan) and Júlio Baptista (Sevilla) were not part of the team as their clubs decided not to release them.

Head coach: Ricardo Gomes

No.	Pos.	Player	Date of birth (age)	Club
1	GK	**Heurelho Gomes**	15 February 1981 (aged 22)	(Brazilian Football Confederation) Cruzeiro
2	DF	**Maicon**	26 July 1981 (aged 22)	(Brazilian Football Confederation) Cruzeiro
3	DF	**Alex**	17 June 1982 (aged 21)	(Brazilian Football Confederation) Santos
4	DF	Edu Dracena	18 May 1981 (aged 22)	(Brazilian Football Confederation) Cruzeiro
5	MF	**Paulo Almeida**	20 April 1981 (aged 22)	(Brazilian Football Confederation) Santos
6	DF	**Maxwell**	27 August 1981 (aged 22)	(Royal Dutch Football Association) Ajax
7	MF	**Elano**	14 June 1981 (aged 22)	(Brazilian Football Confederation) Santos
8	MF	**Fábio Rochemback**	10 December 1981 (aged 22)	(Portuguese Football Federation) Sporting CP
9	FW	**Nilmar**	14 July 1984 (aged 19)	(Brazilian Football Confederation) Internacional
10	MF	**Diego**	28 February 1985 (aged 18)	(Brazilian Football Confederation) Santos
11	FW	**Robinho**	25 January 1984 (aged 19)	(Brazilian Football Confederation) Santos
12	GK	Juninho	9 July 1981 (aged 22)	(Brazilian Football Confederation) Vitória
13	DF	Adaílton	16 April 1983 (aged 20)	(Brazilian Football Confederation) Vitória
14	DF	Rodolfo	23 October 1982 (aged 21)	(Brazilian Football Confederation) Fluminense
15	MF	Wendel	8 April 1982 (aged 21)	(Brazilian Football Confederation) Cruzeiro
16	MF	**Dudu Cearense**	15 April 1983 (aged 20)	(Brazilian Football Confederation) Vitória
17	FW	Dagoberto	22 March 1983 (aged 20)	(Brazilian Football Confederation) Athletico Paranaense
18	FW	Daniel Carvalho	1 March 1983 (aged 20)	(Brazilian Football Confederation) Internacional
19	FW	Marcel	12 November 1981 (aged 22)	(Brazilian Football Confederation) Coritiba
20	MF	Paulinho	16 July 1982 (aged 21)	(Brazilian Football Confederation) Atlético Mineiro

=== Uruguay ===
Uruguay announced their 20-man squad on 2 January 2004. Forward Germán Hornos was not part of the team as its club Sevilla decided not to release him.

Head coach: Juan Ramón Carrasco

No.	Pos.	Player	Date of birth (age)	Club
1	GK	Jorge Bava	2 August 1981 (aged 22)	(Uruguayan Football Association) Nacional
2	DF	Pablo Melo	4 July 1982 (aged 21)	(Uruguayan Football Association) Cerro
3	DF	**Carlos Valdez**	2 May 1983 (aged 20)	(Uruguayan Football Association) Nacional
4	FW	Horacio Peralta	3 June 1982 (aged 21)	(Uruguayan Football Association) Nacional
5	MF	**Jorge Martínez**	5 April 1983 (aged 20)	(Uruguayan Football Association) Montevideo Wanderers
6	DF	**Carlos Diogo**	18 July 1983 (aged 20)	(Uruguayan Football Association) River Plate
7	FW	**Fabián Estoyanoff**	27 September 1982 (aged 21)	(Uruguayan Football Association) Peñarol
8	MF	**Ignacio González**	14 May 1982 (aged 21)	(Uruguayan Football Association) Danubio
9	FW	Sebastián Taborda	22 May 1981 (aged 22)	(Mexican Football Federation) UNAM
10	MF	Carlos Grossmüller	4 May 1983 (aged 20)	(Uruguayan Football Association) Danubio
11	FW	Nicolás Vigneri	6 July 1983 (aged 20)	(Uruguayan Football Association) Fénix
12	GK	Joaquín Hernández	13 July 1982 (aged 21)	(Uruguayan Football Association) Danubio
13	DF	**Pablo Lima**	26 April 1981 (aged 22)	(Uruguayan Football Association) Danubio
14	DF	Jorge Curbelo	21 December 1981 (aged 22)	(Uruguayan Football Association) Danubio
15	FW	Sergio Leal	25 September 1982 (aged 21)	(Uruguayan Football Association) Plaza Colonia
16	MF	Gonzalo Choy	11 November 1981 (aged 22)	(Argentine Football Association) Gimnasia y Esgrima La Plata
17	FW	Sebastián García	9 June 1981 (aged 22)	(Uruguayan Football Association) Deportivo Colonia
18	MF	Daniel Hernández	28 January 1982 (aged 21)	(Uruguayan Football Association) Villa Española
19	MF	**Pablo Munhoz**	31 August 1982 (aged 21)	(Uruguayan Football Association) Defensor Sporting
20	MF	**Rubén Olivera**	4 May 1983 (aged 20)	(Italian Football Federation) Juventus

=== Paraguay ===
Head coach: (Paraguay) Carlos Jara Saguier

No.	Pos.	Player	Date of birth (age)	Caps	Club
12	GK	**Diego Barreto**	16 July 1981 (aged 22)		(Paraguay) Cerro Porteño
1	GK	Ever Caballero	27 April 1982 (aged 21)		(Paraguay) Olimpia Asunción
2	DF	**Emilio Martinez**	10 April 1981 (aged 22)		(Paraguay) Libertad
3	DF	**Julio Manzur**	22 June 1981 (aged 22)		(Paraguay) Guaraní
13	DF	Carlos Alvarenga	23 September 1982 (aged 21)		(Paraguay) Sportivo Luqueño
4	DF	Gilberto Velázquez	11 March 1983 (aged 20)		(Paraguay) Guaraní
5	DF	**José Devaca**	18 September 1982 (aged 21)		(Paraguay) Cerro Porteño
11	DF	**Aureliano Torres**	16 June 1982 (aged 21)		(Paraguay) Guaraní
15	DF	**David Villalba**	20 March 1981 (aged 22)		(Paraguay) Olimpia Asunción
14	DF	Felipe Giménez	26 May 1981 (aged 22)		(Paraguay) Olimpia Asunción
6	MF	Blas Irala	30 November 1983 (aged 20)		(Paraguay) Guaraní
8	MF	**Edgar Barreto**	15 July 1984 (aged 19)		(Paraguay) Cerro Porteño
10	MF	**Diego Figueredo**	28 April 1982 (aged 21)		(Paraguay) Olimpia Asunción
16	MF	Osvaldo Diaz	22 December 1981 (aged 22)		(Paraguay) Guaraní
17	MF	**Jorge Achucarro**	6 November 1981 (aged 22)		(Paraguay) Cerro Porteño
7	FW	Pablo Giménez	29 June 1981 (aged 22)		(Paraguay) Guaraní
9	FW	**Fredy Bareiro**	27 March 1982 (aged 21)		(Paraguay) Libertad
20	FW	Erwin Avalos	27 July 1983 (aged 20)		(Paraguay) Cerro Porteño
18	FW	Alcides Rodas	28 February 1981 (aged 22)		(Paraguay) Guaraní
19	FW	**Julio González**	26 August 1981 (aged 22)		(Paraguay) Nacional Asunción

(Source for player names:)

=== Venezuela ===
Venezuela announced their 20-man squad on 30 December 2003. On 3 January 2004, defender Franklin Lucena was replaced by Daniel Godoy due to an injury.

Head coach: Ramón Hernández

No.	Pos.	Player	Date of birth (age)	Club
1	GK	Juan Álvarez	22 January 1982 (aged 21)	(Venezuelan Football Federation) Deportivo Táchira
2	DF	Arnaldo Aranda	27 February 1982 (aged 21)	(Venezuelan Football Federation) Mineros de Guayana
3	DF	**Andrés Rouga**	2 March 1982 (aged 21)	(Venezuelan Football Federation) Caracas
4	DF	**Oswaldo Vizcarrondo**	31 May 1984 (aged 19)	(Venezuelan Football Federation) Caracas
5	MF	**Miguel Mea Vitali**	19 February 1981 (aged 22)	(Venezuelan Football Federation) Caracas
6	MF	**Giácomo Di Giorgi**	24 February 1981 (aged 22)	(Venezuelan Football Federation) Estudiantes de Mérida
7	MF	**César González**	10 January 1982 (aged 21)	(Venezuelan Football Federation) Monagas
8	MF	Anyelo Rodríguez	22 January 1982 (aged 21)	(Venezuelan Football Federation) Monagas
9	FW	**Giancarlo Maldonado**	29 June 1982 (aged 21)	(Venezuelan Football Federation) Mineros de Guayana
10	MF	**Evelio Hernández**	18 June 1984 (aged 19)	(Venezuelan Football Federation) Trujillanos
11	FW	**Daniel Arismendi**	4 July 1982 (aged 21)	(Venezuelan Football Federation) Mineros de Guayana
12	GK	Gustavo Cortina	22 July 1983 (aged 20)	(Venezuelan Football Federation) Trujillanos
13	MF	Engelberth Briceño	2 April 1984 (aged 19)	(Venezuelan Football Federation) Deportivo Italchacao
14	MF	Vicente Suanno	1 January 1983 (aged 21)	(Venezuelan Football Federation) Deportivo Italchacao
15	MF	**Wuiswell Isea**	13 September 1982 (aged 21)	(Venezuelan Football Federation) Deportivo Anzoátegui
16	DF	Renier Rodríguez	25 March 1984 (aged 19)	(Venezuelan Football Federation) Caracas
17	FW	José María Morr	12 April 1981 (aged 22)	(Venezuelan Football Federation) Estudiantes de Mérida
18	DF	**Gabriel Cichero**	25 April 1984 (aged 19)	(Uruguayan Football Association) Montevideo Wanderers
19	FW	Jansse Pérez	9 April 1981 (aged 22)	(Swiss Football Association) Grenchen
20	DF	**Daniel Godoy**	13 June 1981 (aged 22)	(Venezuelan Football Federation) Marítimo

== Group B ==
=== Argentina ===
Argentina announced their 20-man squad on 23 December 2003. Players such as Javier Saviola (Barcelona), Andrés D'Alessandro (VfL Wolfsburg), Maxi Rodríguez (Espanyol), Matías Lequi (Atlético Madrid), Fabricio Coloccini (Villarreal), Mario Santana (Chievo) and Fernando Cavenaghi (River Plate) were not included in the team as their clubs decided not to release them.

Head coach: Marcelo Bielsa

No.	Pos.	Player	Date of birth (age)	Club
1	GK	**Willy Caballero**	28 January 1981 (aged 22)	(Argentine Football Association) Boca Juniors
2	DF	**Gonzalo Rodríguez**	10 April 1984 (aged 19)	(Argentine Football Association) San Lorenzo
3	DF	**Clemente Rodríguez**	31 July 1981 (aged 22)	(Argentine Football Association) Boca Juniors
4	DF	Pablo Jerez	26 July 1984 (aged 19)	(Argentine Football Association) Boca Juniors
5	MF	**Javier Mascherano**	8 June 1984 (aged 19)	(Argentine Football Association) River Plate
6	DF	**Nicolás Burdisso**	12 April 1981 (aged 22)	(Argentine Football Association) Boca Juniors
7	MF	**Mauro Rosales**	24 February 1981 (aged 22)	(Argentine Football Association) Newell's Old Boys
8	MF	**Lucho González**	19 January 1981 (aged 22)	(Argentine Football Association) River Plate
9	FW	**Luciano Figueroa**	19 May 1981 (aged 22)	(Mexican Football Federation) Cruz Azul
10	FW	**Carlos Tevez**	5 February 1984 (aged 19)	(Argentine Football Association) Boca Juniors
11	FW	Franco Cángele	16 July 1984 (aged 19)	(Argentine Football Association) Boca Juniors
12	GK	**Germán Lux**	7 June 1982 (aged 21)	(Argentine Football Association) River Plate
13	DF	Gastón Aguirre	11 November 1981 (aged 22)	(Argentine Football Association) Newell's Old Boys
14	MF	Osmar Ferreyra	9 January 1983 (aged 20)	(Argentine Football Association) River Plate
15	DF	José María Calvo	15 July 1981 (aged 22)	(Argentine Football Association) Boca Juniors
16	DF	Leandro Fernández	30 January 1983 (aged 20)	(Argentine Football Association) Newell's Old Boys
17	FW	Alejandro Domínguez	10 June 1981 (aged 22)	(Argentine Football Association) River Plate
18	MF	**Mariano González**	5 May 1981 (aged 22)	(Argentine Football Association) Racing
19	FW	**César Delgado**	18 August 1981 (aged 22)	(Mexican Football Federation) Cruz Azul
20	MF	**Nicolás Medina**	17 February 1982 (aged 21)	(Royal Spanish Football Federation) Leganés

=== Colombia ===
Colombia announced their 20-man squad on 31 December 2003.

Head coach: Jaime de la Pava

No.	Pos.	Player	Date of birth (age)	Club
1	GK	David González	20 July 1982 (aged 21)	(Colombian Football Federation) Independiente Medellín
2	DF	Marino García	28 June 1982 (aged 21)	(Colombian Football Federation) Deportes Tolima
3	DF	**Aquivaldo Mosquera**	22 June 1981 (aged 22)	(Colombian Football Federation) Atlético Nacional
4	DF	Robinson Muñoz	6 July 1981 (aged 22)	(Colombian Football Federation) Atlético Nacional
5	DF	Carlos Díaz	28 November 1982 (aged 21)	(Colombian Football Federation) Atlético Nacional
6	MF	Leonardo Rojano	2 January 1981 (aged 23)	(Colombian Football Federation) Millonarios
7	MF	**Álvaro Domínguez**	10 June 1981 (aged 22)	(Colombian Football Federation) Deportivo Cali
8	MF	Luis Ernesto Rojas	14 May 1981 (aged 22)	(Colombian Football Federation) Deportivo Cali
9	FW	**Sergio Herrera**	15 March 1981 (aged 22)	(Colombian Football Federation) América de Cali
10	MF	Julio Valencia	5 April 1983 (aged 20)	(Colombian Football Federation) Envigado
11	FW	**Johnnier Montaño**	14 January 1983 (aged 20)	(Italian Football Federation) Parma
12	GK	**Neco Martínez**	11 July 1982 (aged 21)	(Colombian Football Federation) Envigado
13	DF	**Rubén Darío Bustos**	18 August 1981 (aged 22)	(Colombian Football Federation) América de Cali
14	MF	Leiner Rolong	1 September 1981 (aged 22)	(Colombian Football Federation) Junior
15	FW	Leonardo Enciso	23 April 1982 (aged 21)	(Colombian Football Federation) Deportivo Pasto
16	MF	**Jorge López**	15 August 1981 (aged 22)	(Colombian Football Federation) Millonarios
17	FW	**Martín Arzuaga**	23 July 1981 (aged 22)	(Colombian Football Federation) Junior
18	DF	Diego Valdés	13 August 1981 (aged 22)	(Colombian Football Federation) Deportivo Pasto
19	DF	Jamell Ramos	12 October 1981 (aged 22)	(Colombian Football Federation) Independiente Medellín
20	MF	Felipe Chará	6 January 1981 (aged 23)	(Colombian Football Federation) Atlético Nacional

                                                                                                                                                                                                      (Source for player names:[28])

=== Peru ===
Peru announced their 20-man squad on 3 January 2004.

Head coach: (Brazil) Paulo Autuori

No.	Pos.	Player	Date of birth (age)	Club
1	GK	**Erick Delgado** (captain)	30 June 1982 (aged 21)	(Peruvian Football Federation) Sporting Cristal
2	DF	**Alberto Rodríguez**	31 March 1984 (aged 19)	(Peruvian Football Federation) Sporting Cristal
3	DF	**Miguel Villalta**	16 June 1981 (aged 22)	(Peruvian Football Federation) Sporting Cristal
4	DF	**Roberto Guizasola**	21 August 1984 (aged 19)	(Peruvian Football Federation) Alianza Lima
5	DF	Jair Yglesias	10 February 1981 (aged 22)	(Peruvian Football Federation) Sport Boys
6	MF	Junior Viza	3 April 1985 (aged 18)	(Peruvian Football Federation) Alianza Lima
7	FW	**Jefferson Farfán**	26 October 1984 (aged 19)	(Peruvian Football Federation) Alianza Lima
8	MF	**Luis Hernández**	15 February 1981 (aged 22)	(Peruvian Football Federation) Coronel Bolognesi
9	FW	**Paolo Guerrero**	1 January 1984 (aged 20)	(German Football Association) Bayern Munich
10	MF	**Juan Cominges**	1 October 1983 (aged 20)	(Peruvian Football Federation) Universitario
11	FW	**Wilmer Aguirre**	5 October 1983 (aged 20)	(Peruvian Football Federation) Alianza Lima
12	GK	George Forsyth	20 June 1982 (aged 21)	(Peruvian Football Federation) Atlético Universidad
13	DF	Guillermo Guizasola	8 February 1982 (aged 21)	(Peruvian Football Federation) Alianza Lima
14	FW	Juan González-Vigil	18 February 1985 (aged 18)	(Peruvian Football Federation) Alianza Lima
15	MF	José Corcuera	6 August 1981 (aged 22)	(Peruvian Football Federation) Sport Boys
16	DF	**Julio García**	16 June 1981 (aged 22)	(Peruvian Football Federation) Cienciano
17	DF	**Walter Vílchez**	20 February 1982 (aged 21)	(Peruvian Football Federation) Alianza Lima
18	MF	Enrique Ísmodes	2 March 1983 (aged 20)	(Peruvian Football Federation) Sporting Cristal
19	FW	Manuel Barreto	12 September 1982 (aged 21)	(Peruvian Football Federation) Coronel Bolognesi
20	MF	**Rinaldo Cruzado**	21 September 1984 (aged 19)	(Peruvian Football Federation) Alianza Lima

=== Ecuador ===
Coach: José Jacinto Vega (Ecuador)

No.	Pos.	Player	Date of birth (age)	Caps	Club
12	GK	Rorys Aragón	28 June 1982 (aged 21)		(Ecuador) Emelec
1	GK	Rixon Corozo	8 August 1981 (aged 22)		(Ecuador) El Nacional
2	DF	**Jorge Guagua**	28 September 1981 (aged 22)		(Ecuador) El Nacional
4	DF	Erik de Jesús	8 November 1982 (aged 20)		(Ecuador) El Nacional
3	DF	Luis Checa	21 December 1983 (aged 20)		(Ecuador) El Nacional
6	DF	Geovanny Caicedo	28 March 1981 (aged 22)		(Ecuador) Barcelona
14	DF	José Luis Perlaza	6 October 1981 (aged 21)		(Ecuador) Olmedo
16	DF	Franklin Corozo	15 February 1981 (aged 21)		(Ecuador) Emelec
19	DF	José Aguirre	5 January 1983 (aged 19)		(Ecuador) Emelec
5	MF	**Leonardo Soledispa**	15 January 1983 (aged 20)		(Ecuador) Barcelona
8	MF	**Segundo Castillo**	15 May 1982 (aged 20)		(Ecuador) El Nacional
11	MF	**David Quiroz**	8 September 1982 (aged 20)		(Ecuador) El Nacional
15	MF	**Antonio Valencia**	4 August 1985 (aged 17)		(Ecuador) El Nacional
18	MF	**Luis Saritama**	20 October 1983 (aged 19)		(Ecuador) Deportivo Quito
10	MF	**Franklin Salas**	30 August 1981 (aged 21)		(Ecuador) LDU Quito
13	MF	Xavier Intriago	16 May 1982 (aged 20)		(Ecuador) Deportivo Quito
17	FW	**Roberto Miña**	7 November 1984 (aged 18)		(Argentina) Huracán
20	FW	Darwin Caicedo	25 May 1983 (aged 19)		(Ecuador) Emelec
7	FW	**Félix Borja**	2 April 1983 (aged 19)		(Ecuador) El Nacional
9	FW	**Jhonny Baldeón**	15 June 1981 (aged 21)		(Ecuador) Deportivo Quito

=== Bolivia ===
Head coach: (Uruguay) Nelson Acosta

No.	Pos.	Player	Date of birth (age)	Caps	Club
12	GK	**Hugo Suárez**	4 July 1983 (aged 20)		(Bolivia) Club Jorge Wilstermann
1	GK	Diter Alquiza	26 October 1982 (aged 21)		(Bolivia) Real Santa Cruz
2	DF	**Hermán Solíz**	14 July 1982 (aged 21)		(Bolivia) The Strongest
3	DF	**Álvaro Ricaldi**	28 April 1982 (aged 21)		(Bolivia) Jorge Wilstermann
4	DF	Daner Pachi	1 April 1984 (aged 19)		(Bolivia) Bolívar
6	DF	**Ronald Raldes**	20 April 1981 (aged 22)		(Argentina) Rosario Central
13	DF	**Jorge Ortiz**	1 June 1984 (aged 19)		(Bolivia) Blooming
17	DF	**Miguel Hoyos**	26 May 1981 (aged 22)		(Bolivia) Oriente Petrolero
19	DF	Adrián Rocabado	30 July 1983 (aged 20)		(Bolivia) The Strongest
5	MF	**Gualberto Mojica**	2 September 1982 (aged 21)		(Bolivia) Jorge Wilstermann
7	MF	Hugo Rojas	17 April 1983 (aged 20)		(Bolivia) Aurora
10	MF	Julio César Cortéz	10 February 1981 (aged 22)		(Bolivia) Blooming
16	MF	**Joselito Vaca**	4 April 1982 (aged 21)		(United States) Dallas
15	MF	**Sergio Jáuregui**	13 March 1985 (aged 18)		(Bolivia) Blooming
20	MF	Boris Montaño	22 May 1982 (aged 21)		(Bolivia) The Strongest
14	MF	Carlos Suárez	19 April 1982 (aged 21)		(Bolivia) Jorge Wilstermann
18	FW	**José Alfredo Castillo**	9 February 1983 (aged 20)		(Mexico) Estudiantes Tecos
11	FW	David Paz	29 July 1981 (aged 22)		(Bolivia) Real Potosí
8	FW	**Juan Carlos Arce**	10 April 1985 (aged 18)		(Bolivia) Oriente Petrolero
9	FW	**Limbert Méndez**	18 August 1982 (aged 21)		(Bolivia) Jorge Wilstermann
