= Deaths in July 1984 =

The following is a list of notable deaths in July 1984.

Entries for each day are listed alphabetically by surname. A typical entry lists information in the following sequence:

- Name, age, country of citizenship at birth, subsequent country of citizenship (if applicable), reason for notability, cause of death (if known), and reference.

== July 1984 ==
=== 1 ===
- Moshé Feldenkrais, 80, Ukrainian founder of the Feldenkrais Method
- Ravishankar Vyas, 100, Indian social reformer, activist, and social worker

=== 2 ===
- Ramiro Cortés, 50, American composer
- Timmy O'Sullivan, 55, Irish Gaelic footballer

=== 3 ===
- Sydney E. Ahlstrom, 64, American historian
- Raoul Salan, 85, French general

=== 4 ===
- Starke R. Hathaway, 80, American psychologist
- Golam Mowla, 64, Bangladeshi businessman

=== 5 ===
- Lord Adam Gordon, 75, British royal courtier
- Dick Wood, 77, Australian politician

=== 6 ===
- Kevin Cairns, 55, Australian politician and dentist
- Mina Wylie, 93, one of Australia's first female Olympic swimming representatives

=== 7 ===
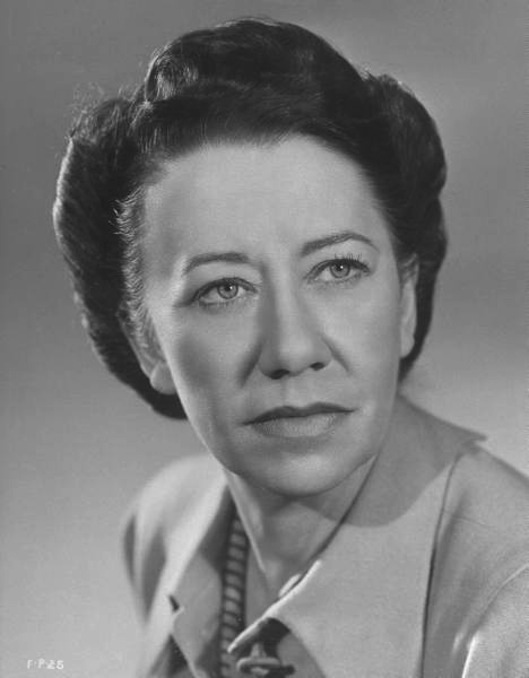
Flora Robson

- Dame Flora Robson, 82, English actress

=== 8 ===
- Brassaï, 84, Hungarian-French photographer
- Claudio Sánchez-Albornoz, 91, Spanish historian and politician

=== 9 ===
- Paulo Valentim, 50, Brazilian professional footballer

=== 10 ===
- Anton Hackl, German Luftwaffe military aviator during World War II

=== 11 ===
- Yasuo Akizuki, 81, Japanese mathematician

=== 12 ===
- D. V. Rao, 67, Indian politician

=== 13 ===
- Marinus De Jong, 93, Dutch-born Belgian composer and pianist
- Pina Renzi, 82, Italian film actress

=== 14 ===
- Frater Albertus, 73, German-American esotericist
- Philippe Wynne, 43, American singer

=== 15 ===
- Enrique Godoy Sayán, 81, Cuban business magnate and banker

=== 16 ===
- Karl Wolff, 84, German Nazi SS Officer

=== 17 ===
- Malati Ghoshal, 81, Indian Rabindra Sangeet singer
- Klaus Wachsmann, 77, British ethnomusicologist

=== 18 ===
- Lally Bowers, 70, English actress
- Flora Solomon, 88, British Zionist

=== 19 ===
- Faina Ranevskaya, 87, Soviet and Russian actress
- John Vaizey, Baron Vaizey, British author and economist

=== 20 ===
- Gabriel Andrew Dirac, 59, Hungarian-born British mathematician
- Gail Kubik, 69, American composer.
- Marko Ristić, 82, Serbian surrealist poet, writer, publicist and ambassador

=== 21 ===
- Adam Adamson, 100, New Zealand businessman, accountant and local politician

=== 22 ===
- Ernesto Albán, 72, Ecuadorian actor

=== 23 ===
- Achiel Buysse, 65, Belgian cyclist

=== 24 ===
- Richard Angst, 79, Swiss cinematographer

=== 25 ===
- George Renwick, 82, British sprinter
- Big Mama Thornton, 57, American singer

=== 26 ===
- Thelma Bate, 79, Australian community leader and women's activist
- George Gallup, 82, American statistician and opinion pollster
- Ed Gein, 77, American serial killer, respiratory failure, secondary to lung cancer

=== 27 ===
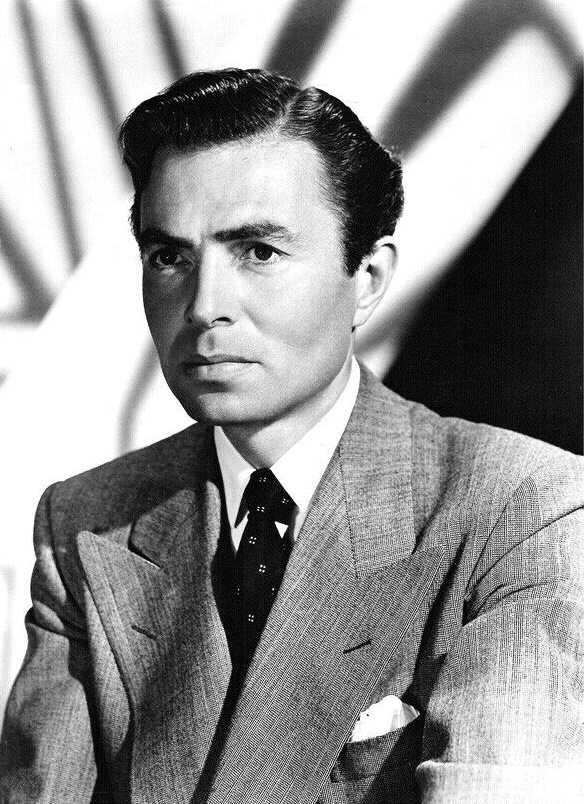
James Mason

- Laurence Jackson, 83, Scottish curler
- James Mason, 75, English actor

=== 28 ===
- Paul L. Adams, 69, American academic and president of Roberts Wesleyan College
- Bess Flowers, 85, American actress

=== 29 ===
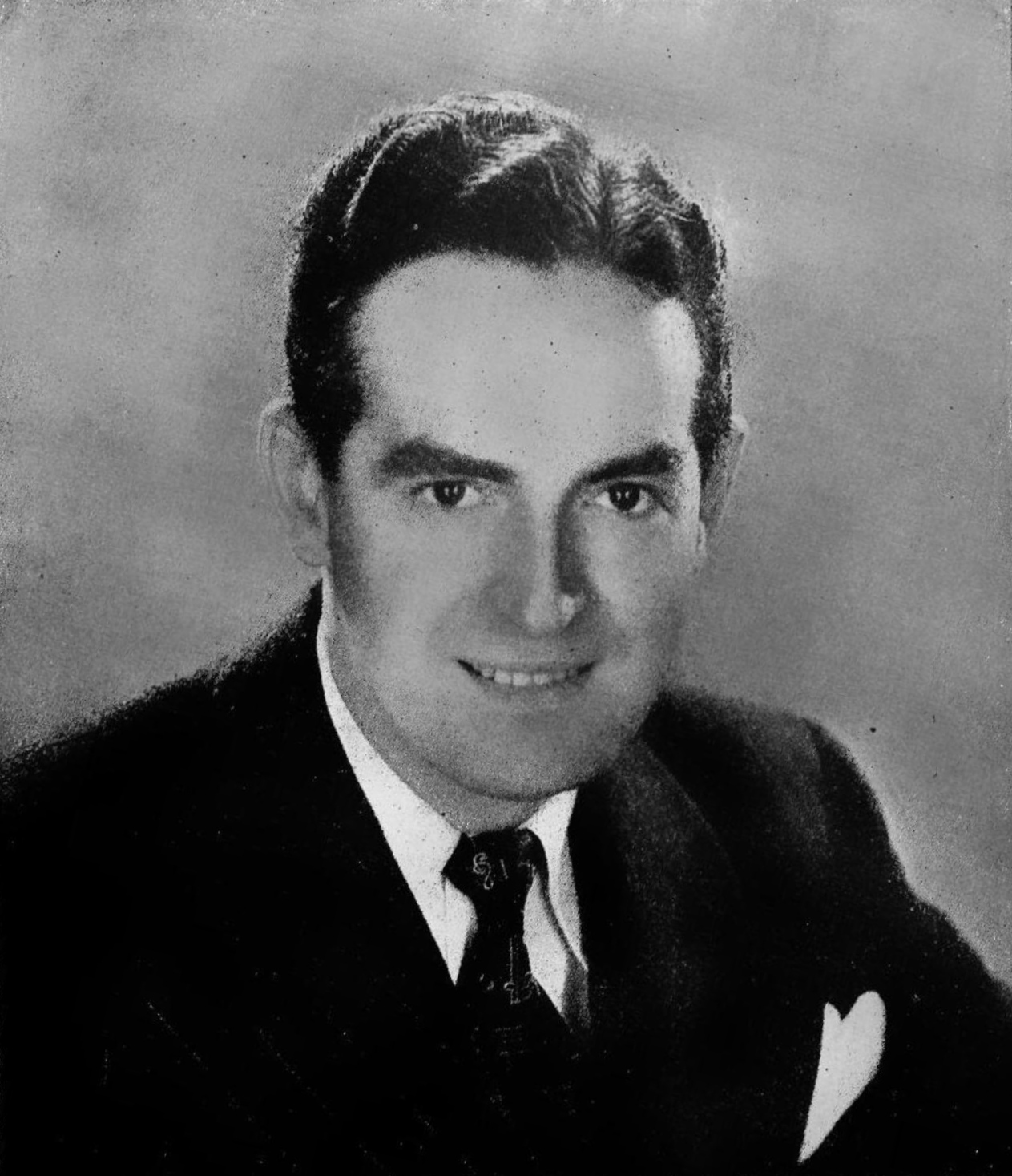
Fred Waring

- Lorenz Fehenberger, 71, German operatic tenor
- Fred Waring, 84, American bandleader, choral director, radio and television personality

=== 30 ===
- Maurice Tremlett, 61, English cricketer
- Surya Prasad Upadhyaya, 76, Nepalese politician

=== 31 ===
- Gopi Krishna, 81, Indian yogi, mystic, teacher, social reformer, and writer
- Paul Le Flem, 103, French composer and music critic

== Sources ==
- Schechter, Harold (1989). Deviant: The Shocking True Story of the Original 'Psycho'. New York: Pocket Books. p. 274. ISBN 978-0671644826. OCLC 40002199.
