= Corozo =

Corozo may refer to:

Places:

- A village in Bluefields municipality, Nicaragua
- A village in San José de los Remates municipality, Nicaragua
- A river in the Dominican Republic
- Several villages in Ocozocoautla de Espinosa municipality, Mexico

Plants:

- Acrocomia media, a grugru palm
- Aiphanes horrida, a ruffle palm
- Attalea, an American oil palm genus
- Elaeis, the main commercial oil palm genus
- Maranthes panamensis, a Chrysobalanaceae shrub
- The endosperm of Phytelephas palm seeds ("vegetable ivory")

People:

- Dennis Corozo, Ecuadorian footballer playing for Centro Deportivo Olmedo
- Felipe Salvador Caicedo Corozo, Ecuadorian footballer playing for Manchester City F.C.
- Franklin Corozo, Ecuadorian footballer playing for Sociedad Deportivo Quito
- Luis Corozo, Peruvian footballer playing for FBC Melgar
- Rixon Javier Corozo Hurtado, Ecuadorian Footballer playing for Club Deportivo El Nacional
- Walter Orlando Ayoví Corozo, Ecuadorian footballer playing for Club Deportivo El Nacional
- Yason Corozo, Ecuadorian footballer playing for Club Social y Deportivo Macará

== See also ==
- Corozal, Puerto Rico
- Laguna Los Corozos, a lagoon near San Juan, Puerto Rico
