= Godoi =

Godoi may refer to:

== Surname ==
- Allan Godói (born 1993), Brazilian footballer
- Icaro Goes Godoi (born 1982), American/Brazilian cinematographer
- Juan Silvano Godoi (1850-1926), a librarian and intellectual at the time of the Paraguayan national reconstruction
- Júnior Godoi (born 1978), a Brazilian footballer
- Rafael Godoi Pereira (born 1985), a Brazilian footballer
- Victor Godoi (born 1975), a retired Argentinian boxer

== Placename ==
- Cândido Godói, a municipality in Brazil.

== See also ==
- Godoy, a surname
