= María Isabel Reyes García =

Mexican politician

- Born: 18 June 1969 (age 56); Naucalpan, State of Mexico, Mexico
- Occupation: Politician
- Political party: PAN

María Isabel Reyes García (born 18 June 1969) is a Mexican politician from the National Action Party (PAN). From 2008 to 2009 she sat in the Chamber of Deputies during the 60th session of Congress representing the State of Mexico's 22nd district as the alternate of Moisés Alcalde Virgen.
