= Patricia Durán Reveles =

Mexican politician

- Born: 20 March 1972 (age 54); State of Mexico, Mexico
- Education: Architecture Universidad Iberoamericana Mexico City
- Occupation: Politician
- Political party: MORENA

Patricia Elisa Durán Reveles (born 20 March 1972) is a Mexican politician now affiliated with the National Regeneration Movement (Morena).

In the 2003 mid-terms she was elected to the Chamber of Deputies for the National Action Party (PAN) to represent the State of Mexico's 24th district during the 59th session of Congress.

After a stint as a local deputy with Movimiento Ciudadano (MC), she changed to Morena and ran for that party for mayor of Naucalpan de Juárez in 2018.
