= Irazema González Martínez =

Mexican politician

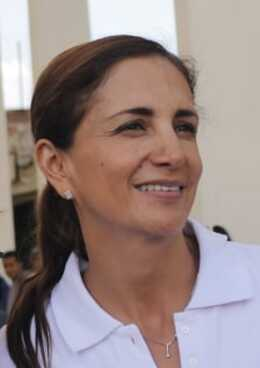
- Born: 19 April 1974 (age 52); Naucalpan, State of Mexico, Mexico
- Occupation: Politician
- Political party: PRI

Irazema González Martínez Olivares (born 19 April 1974) is a Mexican politician affiliated with the Institutional Revolutionary Party (PRI). In the 2012 general election she was elected to the Chamber of Deputies to represent the State of Mexico's 24th district during the 62nd session of Congress.
