= 22nd federal electoral district of the State of Mexico =

Federal electoral district of Mexico

State of Mexico's 22nd
- Electoral district of the Chamber of Deputies of Mexico

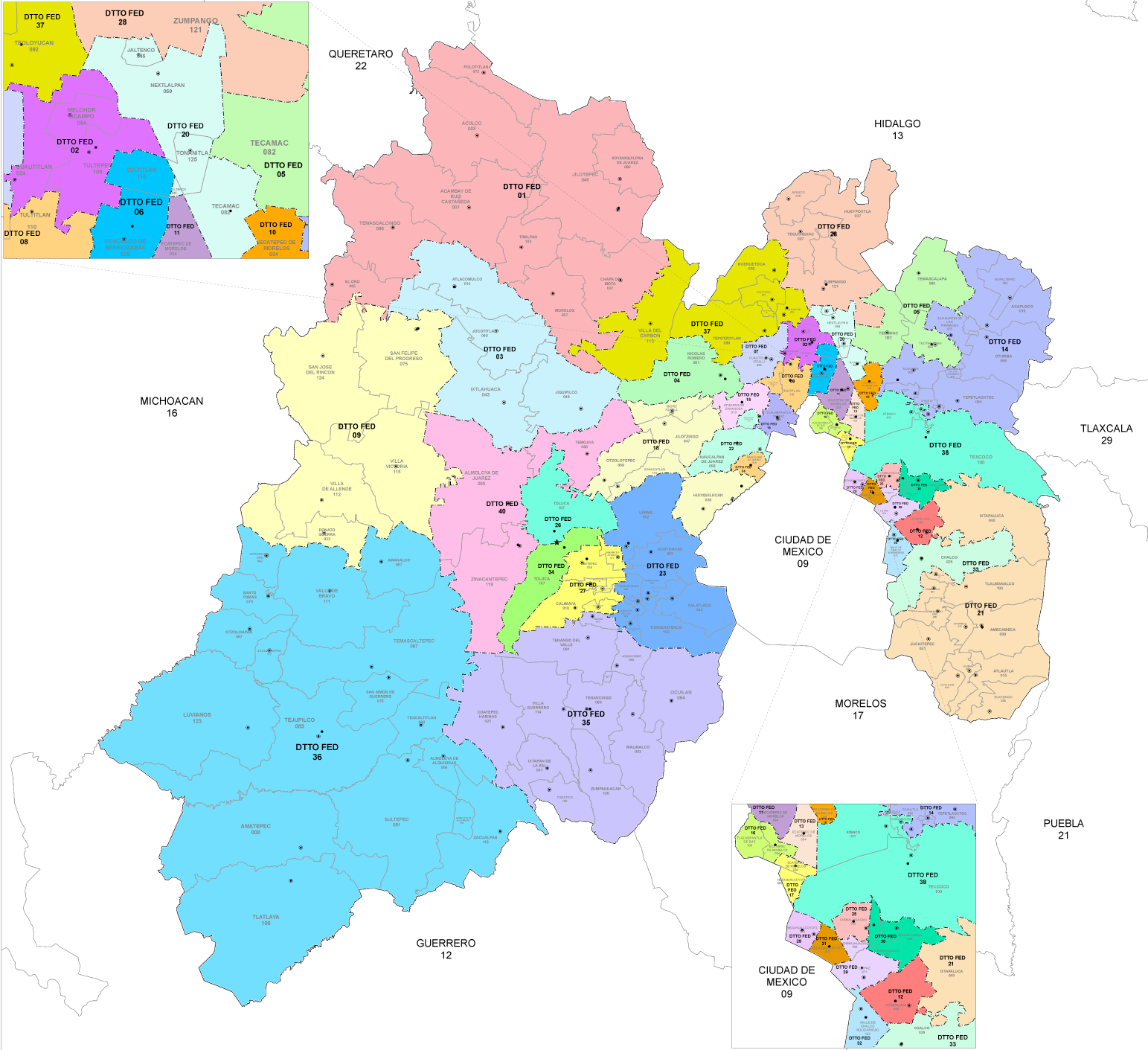
- State of Mexico's districts since 2023

Incumbent
- Member: Martha Amalia Moya Bastón
- Party: ▌National Action Party
- Congress: 66th (2024–2027)

District
- State: State of Mexico
- Head town: Naucalpan
- Coordinates: 19°28′N 99°14′W
- Covers: Naucalpan de Juárez (part), Atizapán de Zaragoza (part)
- PR region: Fifth
- Precincts: 218
- Population: 432,713 (2020 census)

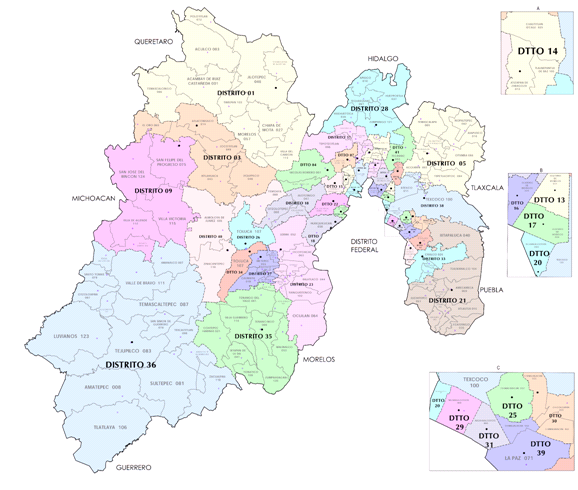
2017–2022 districting scheme

The 22nd federal electoral district of the State of Mexico (Spanish: Distrito electoral federal 22 del Estado de México) is one of the 300 electoral districts into which Mexico is divided for elections to the federal Chamber of Deputies and one of 40 such districts in the State of Mexico.

It elects one deputy to the lower house of Congress for each three-year legislative session by means of the first-past-the-post system. Votes cast in the district also count towards the calculation of proportional representation ("plurinominal") deputies elected from the fifth region.

The 22nd district was created by the 1977 electoral reforms, which increased the number of single-member seats in the Chamber of Deputies from 196 to 300. Under that plan, the State of Mexico's seat allocation rose from 15 to 34. The new districts were first contended in the 1979 mid-term election.

The current member for the district, elected in the 2024 general election, is Martha Amalia Moya Bastón of the National Action Party (PAN).

== District territory ==
Under the 2023 districting plan adopted by the National Electoral Institute (INE), which is to be used for the 2024, 2027 and 2030 federal elections, the 22nd district is located in the Greater Mexico City urban area, covering 218 electoral precincts (secciones electorales) across parts of two of the state's 125 municipalities:

- Naucalpan de Juárez and Atizapán de Zaragoza. (Note: The remainder of Naucalpan votes in the 24th district, while the remainder of Atizapán is covered by the 15th and 23rd districts.)

The head town (cabecera distrital), where results from individual polling stations are gathered together and tallied, is the city of Naucalpan. In the 2020 census, the district reported a total population of 432,713.

== Previous districting schemes ==
Evolution of electoral district numbers
	1974	1978	1996	2005	2017	2023
State of Mexico	15	34	36	40	41	40
Chamber of Deputies	196	300				

Under the previous districting plans enacted by the INE and its predecessors, the 22nd district was situated as follows:

2017–2022

The north-eastern, central and western potions of the municipality of Naucalpan de Juárez.

2005–2017

The north-eastern and eastern potions of Naucalpan de Juárez.

1996–2005

The south-eastern and central potions of Naucalpan de Juárez.

1978–1996

A portion of the municipality of Nezahualcóyotl.

== Deputies returned to Congress ==
(Mexico) National parties
- Current
- PAN
- PRI
- PT
- PVEM
- MC
- Morena
- PAZ
- Somos
- Defunct or local only
- PLM
- PNR
- PRM
- PNM
- PP
- PPS
- PARM
- PFCRN
- CON
- PANAL
- PSD
- PES
- PES
- PRD

State of Mexico's 22nd district
Election	Deputy	Party	Term	Legislature
1979	María Elena Prado Mercado	Institutional Revolutionary Party	1979–1982	51st Congress
1982	José Luis García García	Institutional Revolutionary Party	1982–1985	52nd Congress
1985	Guillermo Juan Altamirano Conde	Institutional Revolutionary Party	1985–1988	53rd Congress
1988	Francisco Javier López González	Institutional Revolutionary Party	1988–1991	54th Congress
1991	Rafael Gilberto Bernal Chávez	Institutional Revolutionary Party	1991–1994	55th Congress
1994	Alejandro Iván Audry Sánchez	Institutional Revolutionary Party	1994–1997	56th Congress
1997	José Luis Bárcena Trejo	Institutional Revolutionary Party	1997–2000	57th Congress
2000	Griselda Ramírez Guzmán	National Action Party (Mexico)	2000–2003	58th Congress
2003	Víctor Manuel Sánchez Hernández	National Action Party (Mexico)	2003–2006	59th Congress
2006	Moisés Alcalde Virgen; María Isabel Reyes García (Note: Reyes García, the alternate, was sworn in on 11 December 2008.)	National Action Party (Mexico)	2006–2008; 2008–2009	60th Congress
2009	David Ricardo Sánchez Guevara	Institutional Revolutionary Party	2009–2012	61st Congress
2012	Rosalba Gualito Castañeda	Institutional Revolutionary Party	2012–2015	62nd Congress
2015	Angélica Moya Marín; Alba María Milán Lara (Note: Milán Lara, the alternate, was sworn in on 1 February 2018.)	National Action Party (Mexico)	2015–2018; 2018	63rd Congress
2018	María Teresa Rebeca Rosa Mora Ríos	National Regeneration Movement	2018–2021	64th Congress
2021	Iván Arturo Rodríguez Rivera	National Action Party (Mexico)	2021–2024	65th Congress
2024	Martha Amalia Moya Bastón	National Action Party (Mexico)	2024–2027	66th Congress

== Presidential elections ==
State of Mexico's 22nd district
Election	District won by	Party or coalition	%
2018	Andrés Manuel López Obrador	Juntos Haremos Historia	42.7531
2024	Bertha Xóchitl Gálvez Ruiz	Fuerza y Corazón por México	50.5516
