= Rosalba Gualito Castañeda =

Mexican politician

- Born: 19 September 1966 (age 59); Mexico City, Mexico
- Occupation: Politician
- Political party: PRI

Rosalba Gualito Castañeda (born 19 September 1966) is a Mexican politician affiliated with the Institutional Revolutionary Party (PRI). In the 2012 general election she was elected to the Chamber of Deputies to represent the State of Mexico's 22nd district during the 62nd session of Congress.
