= Ángeles Huerta del Río =

Mexican politician and journalist

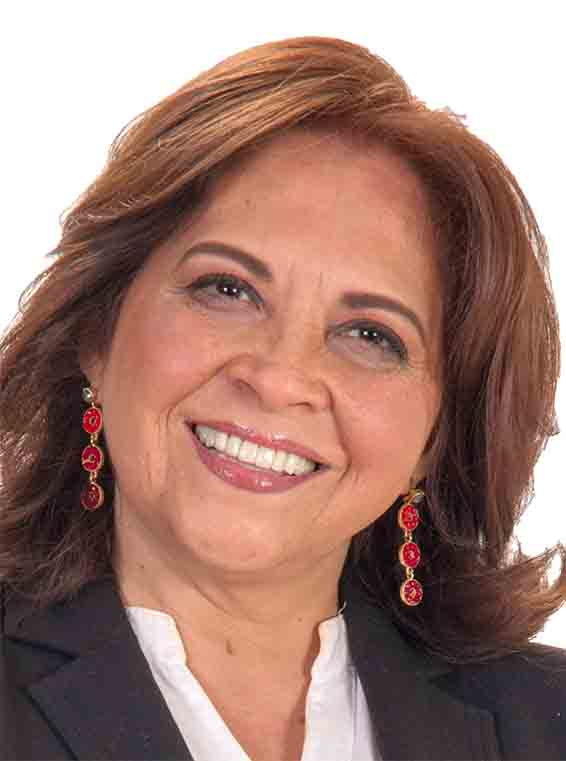
- Born: August 10, 1962 (age 62)
- Known for: Deputy of the Mexican Congress of the Union

María de los Ángeles Huerta del Río (born August 10, 1962) is a Mexican politician and journalist who, as a member of the National Regeneration Movement (Morena) party, served as a federal deputy of the General Congress of the United Mexican States for the period from 2018 to 2021, representing the State of Mexico's 24th district.

== Biography ==
Ángeles Huerta holds a degree in Journalism and Collective Communication from the National Autonomous University of Mexico (UNAM) and a master's degree in Public Policy from Queen Mary University of London. She also has unfinished doctoral studies in Political Communication from Goldsmiths, University of London, and UNAM. She has completed other courses and diplomas in various fields.

She began her professional career in 1986 as a reporter at Televisa, from where she moved on to become the sub-manager of the XEB-AM station of the Mexican Radio Institute (IMER) from the last year to 1989, and from 1989 to 1990, she was a producer and host at the Mexican Television System. She later devoted herself to teaching and has been a columnist for media outlets such as El Financiero, La Jornada, and Novedades.

Her first political position was in 2014, as a communication advisor for Morena. In 2018, she was nominated as a candidate for federal deputy for district 24 in the state of Mexico by the Together We Will Make History coalition. She was elected to the LXIV Legislature, joining the Morena parliamentary group. In the Chamber of Deputies, she is a member of the Science, Technology, and Innovation; Culture and Film; and Radio and Television commissions.

Following the accident on Line 12 of the Mexico City Metro on May 11, 2021, she submitted a request for the impeachment of Senator Miguel Ángel Mancera - the former head of the Mexico City government - to the Permanent Commission of the center, accusing him of alleged criminal negligence in the accident.
