= Sergio Mancilla Zayas =

Mexican politician

- Born: 15 November 1971 (age 54); Naucalpan, State of Mexico, Mexico
- Occupation: Politician
- Political party: PRI

Sergio Mancilla Zayas (born 15 November 1971) is a Mexican politician from the Institutional Revolutionary Party (PRI). In the 2009 mid-terms he was elected to the Chamber of Deputies to represent the State of Mexico's 24th district during the 61st session of Congress.
