= Hilario Esquivel Martínez =

Mexican politician

- Born: 14 January 1956 (age 70); Naucalpan, State of Mexico, Mexico
- Occupation: Politician
- Political party: PAN (1992–2003)

Hilario Esquivel Martínez (born 14 January 1956) is a Mexican politician formerly from the National Action Party (PAN). In the 2000 general election, he was elected to the Chamber of Deputies to represent the State of Mexico's 24th district during the 58th session of Congress (2000 to 2003).

He resigned his membership in the PAN in January 2003 and subsequently sat as an independent.
