= David Sánchez Guevara =

Mexican politician (born 1974)

- Born: 29 December 1974 (age 51); State of Mexico, Mexico
- Occupation: Politician
- Political party: PRI

David Ricardo Sánchez Guevara (born 29 December 1974) is a Mexican politician from the Institutional Revolutionary Party (PRI).

In the 2009 mid-terms he was elected to the Chamber of Deputies to represent the State of Mexico's 22nd district during the 61st session of Congress. He returned to Congress in the 2015 mid-terms for the State of Mexico's 24th district.
