= Moisés Alcalde Virgen =

Mexican politician

- Born: 28 July 1971 (age 54); State of Mexico, Mexico
- Occupation: Politician
- Political party: PAN

Moisés Alcalde Virgen (born 28 July 1971) is a Mexican politician affiliated with the National Action Party (PAN).

In the 2000 general election he was elected to the Chamber of Deputies to represent the State of Mexico's 21st district during the 58th session of Congress. He returned to Congress in the 2006 general election to represent the state's 22nd district during the 60th session.
