= Godoy Cruz =

Godoy Cruz may refer to:

- Godoy Cruz Department, a central department of Mendoza Province in Argentina
- Godoy Cruz, Mendoza, a city in Godoy Cruz Department, Argentina
- Tomás Godoy Cruz, (1791-1852), Argentine statesman and businessman
- Godoy Cruz Antonio Tomba, an Argentine football club
