= Godoi (footballer) =

Brazilian footballer (born 1985)

Personal information
- Full name: Rafael Godoi Pereira
- Date of birth: 7 May 1985 (age 41)
- Place of birth: Campinas, Brazil
- Height: 1.80 m (5 ft 11 in)
- Position: Striker

Senior career*
Years	Team	Apps	(Gls)
2003–2006	Ponte Preta	2	(0)
2006–2009	Villa Rio		
2007	→ Modriča (loan)		
2008	→ Sint-Truidense (loan)	0	(0)
2008	→ Laktaši (loan)	2	(0)
2009	Montlingen		
2013–2015	Rot-Weiß Rankweil		
- * Club domestic league appearances and goals

Rafael Godoi Pereira (born 7 May 1985) is a Brazilian football striker.

== Football career ==
Godoi started his career at Ponte Preta. He signed a two-year contract with club in March 2003.

In August 2006, he signed a three-year deal for Villa Rio. In summer 2007, he signed for Modriča. In January 2008, he moved to Belgian club Sint-Truidense. In July 2008, he returned to Bosnia and Herzegovina this time to play with Laktaši. In summer 2009, he signed for Swiss club Montlingen.

In 2004, he was part of the Brazilian U-20 team that won a friendly tournament in Barcelona.
