= Carlos Alvarenga =

Paraguayan footballer (born 1982)

Personal information
- Date of birth: 23 September 1982 (age 44)
- Place of birth: Hernandarias, Paraguay
- Position: Defender

Senior career*
Years	Team	Apps	(Gls)
2004–2005	Sportivo Luqueño	25	(1)
2005	12 de Octubre	9	(0)
2006–2007	Universitario de Sucre	68	(3)
2008	San José	26	(0)
2009	Sol de América	20	(1)
2009–2010	Sport Huancayo	31	(4)
Total		179	(9)
Medal record
Second place	Torneo Descentralizado	2007
- * Club domestic league appearances and goals

Carlos Alvarenga (born 23 September 1982) is a Paraguayan footballer who played for clubs including Sport Huancayo of the Primera División in Peru.
