= Jorge Godoy Cárdenas =

Mexican politician

- Born: 25 May 1954 (age 71); State of Mexico, Mexico
- Occupation: Politician
- Political party: MC

Jorge Godoy Cárdenas (born 25 May 1954) is a Mexican politician affiliated with the Citizens' Movement (MC). In the 2006 general election he was elected to the Chamber of Deputies to represent the State of Mexico's 24th district during the 60th session of Congress.
