= Danner Pachi =

Bolivian footballer (born 1984)

Personal information
- Full name: Danner Jesús Pachi Bozo
- Date of birth: April 1, 1984 (age 42)
- Place of birth: Caranavi, Bolivia
- Height: 1.66 m (5 ft 5 in)
- Position: Midfielder

Senior career*
Years	Team	Apps	(Gls)
2001–2007	Bolívar	203	(35)
2007	→ Wilstermann (loan)	19	(3)
2008	Bolívar	26	(8)
2009	LDU Portoviejo	24	(7)
2010	Bolívar	10	(0)
2010	Espoli	15	(1)
2011	Guabirá	19	(2)
2011–2012	Real Potosí	31	(0)
2014	Sport Boys Warnes	22	(0)

International career^{‡}
2004–2009	Bolivia	13	(0)
- * Club domestic league appearances and goals as of October 20, 2010 ‡ National team caps and goals as of October 12, 2009

Danner Jesús Pachi Bozo (born April 1, 1984, in Caranavi) is a former Bolivian football midfielder that is currently training Saint Andrew's School from La Paz Bolivia.

== Club career ==
Pachi began his career in 2001 with Bolivian giant Bolívar. He spent nearly 7 years with the club with over 200 league appearances throughout this period. In the winter of 2007 he was loaned to Wilstermann, but after six months Bolívar claimed back his services. In his return to the academia, Pachi had an outstanding 2008 season. His good performance awoke the interest of many clubs abroad. In January 2009, he signed for Ecuadorian club LDU Portoviejo, which was relegated at the end of the season. The next year he returned to Bolívar, but did not get much playing time. In 2011, he signed for club Guabirá.

== International career ==
Since his debut in 2004, Pachi has earned 13 caps with the Bolivia national team. He represented his country in 10 FIFA World Cup qualification matches.

== Honours ==
=== Club ===
- Bolívar
  - Liga de Fútbol Profesional Boliviano: 2002, 2004 (A), 2005 (A), 2006 (C)
