= Jorge Godoy =

Chief of Staff of the Argentine Navy

Jorge Omar Godoy
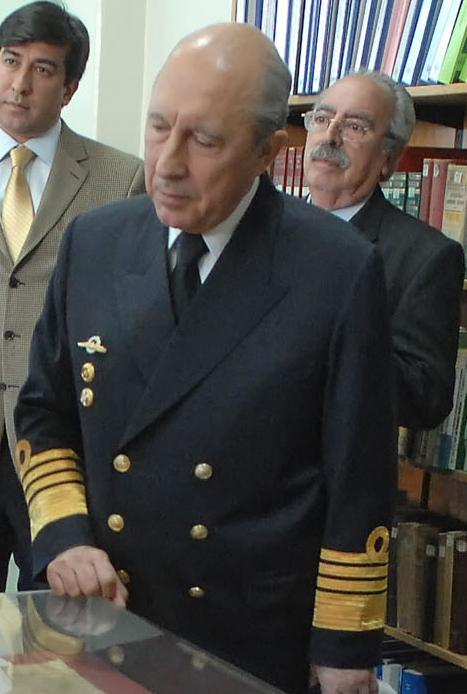
- Born: 17 January 1946 (age 80); Mar del Plata, Argentina
- Military career
- Allegiance: Argentina
- Branch: Argentine Navy
- Rank: Admiral
- Commands: Chief of Staff of the Argentine Navy

Admiral Jorge Godoy is a former Chief of Staff of the Argentine Navy, being in office until December 2011.

== Personal life ==
Jorge Godoy was born on January 17, 1946, in Mar del Plata, Argentina. He is married to former María Laura Valdivia Lúpiz and they have two children.

== Naval career ==
- 1993, promoted to Captain
- 1999, promoted to Admiral
- 2000, awarded the Meritorious Service Medal "Almirante Joaquim Marques Lisboa, Marqués de Tamandaré" by the Navy of Brazil.
- 2001, appointed Assistant Secretary of Institutional Relations, Navy General Secretariat.
- 2002, took command of the Southern Naval Area and the Almirante Berisso naval base in Ushuaia.
- 2003, Order of Naval Merit (Brazil), degree Grand Officer
- 2003, appointed Vice Admiral
- 2003, awarded Order To Naval Merit, degree Commander, by Chile
- 2004, Legion of Merit, United States.

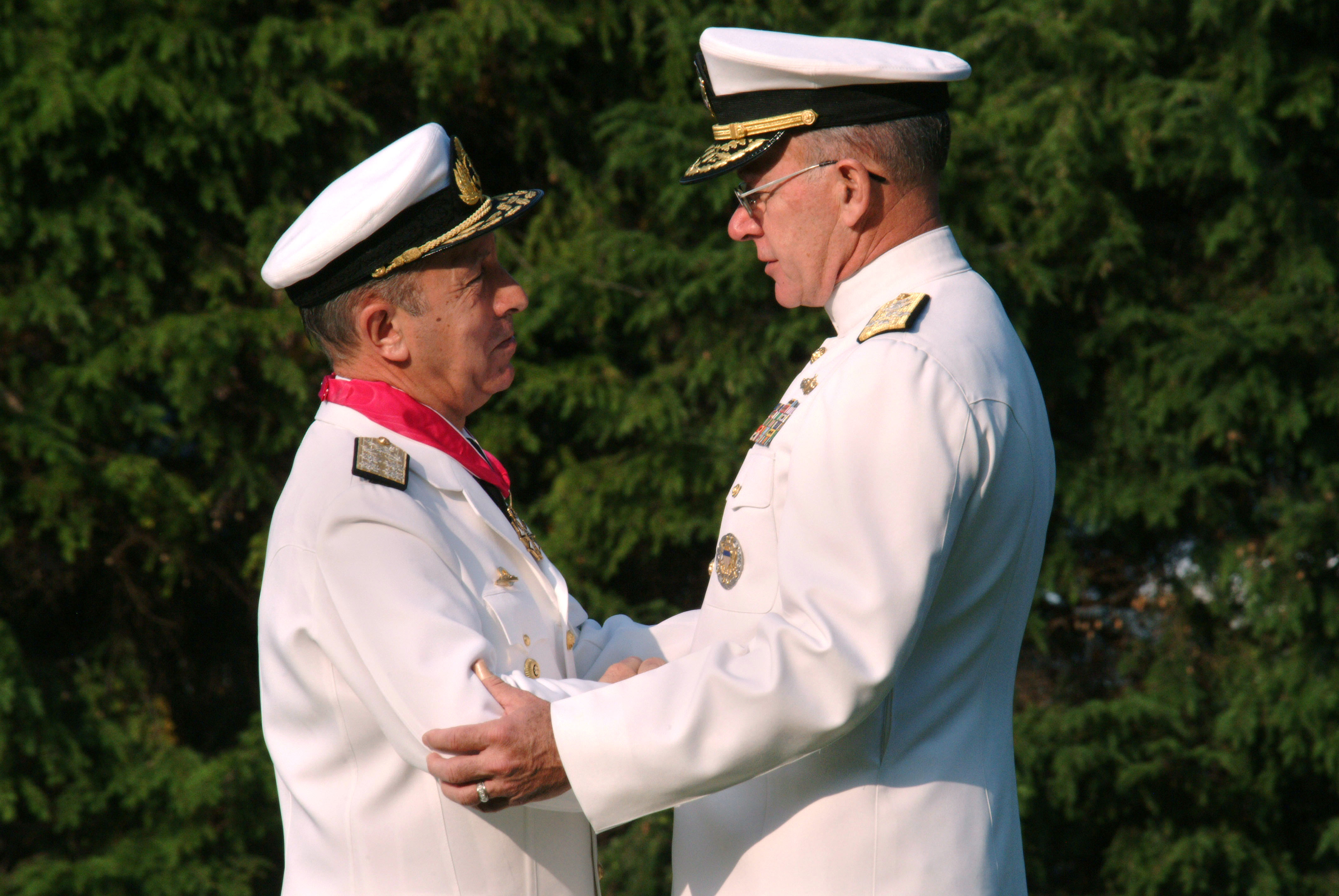
Admiral Godoy receiving the Legion of Merit from Admiral Vern Clark

== Domestic Espionage Charges ==
In December 2011, Godoy retired upon being charged with domestic espionage against politicians, civic activists, and human rights organizations. According to the accusation, Godoy is culpable because the practice was widespread and continuous across the Navy. Article 248 of the Argentine Penal Code forbids military intelligence agencies from investigating citizens, and from operating within the domestic sphere. As of August 2012, Godoy has been convicted and is awaiting sentencing.
