= Ernesto Albán =

- Born: Ernesto Albán Mosquera; June 5, 1912; Ambato, Ecuador
- Died: July 22, 1984 (aged 72); Quito, Ecuador
- Occupations: Actor, Singer

Ernesto Albán Mosquera (June 5, 1912, in Ambato – July 22, 1984, in Quito) was a popular vaudeville and film actor in Ecuador.

== Biography ==
Alban was born in Ambato in 1912. His parents were Luis Alfonso Albán Egüez and Dolores Mosquera Veloz.

He started as a singer of tangos and later became one of the most popular actors in Ecuador. He started acting in theatrical plays in the 1930s. He and his wife, Chavica Gómez, gained fame as actors, and formed a theater company, which consisted of other acclaimed actors such as Oscar Guerra and Lastenia Rivadeneira, with whom he launched the "Estampas Quiteñas", comedies regarding the humor of everyday life in Ecuador.

He performed in plays such as En un burro tres baturros by Alberto Novión from Argentina, A Campo Atraviesa by Felipe Sassone from Peru, and Argentino en Madrid, as well as French vaudevilles and the Spanish comedies of Carlos Arniches, Navarro y Torrado, Linares Rivas, Joaquín Dicenta, Jacinto Benavente and others.

He also co-produced Mexican films, in which he played roles. He appeared in the films En la mitad del mundo (1964), 'Santo' contra los secuestradores (1973) and Fiebre de juventud (1966).

He was widely associated with the comedic character he played named "Evaristo Corral y Chancleta" in the "Estampas Quiteñas", created by the writer Alfonso García Muñoz. Albán Mosquera was greatly influenced by Charles Chaplin.

He died in Quito on July 22, 1984 at the age of 72. His body is buried in the Cementerio Parques del Recuerdo in Quito.

== Filmography ==
Year	Title	Role	Notes
1962	Contra viento y marea		
1963	División narcóticos	Don Ruffo	
1964	Las chivas rayadas		
1964	La sonrisa de los pobres		
1964	En la mitad del mundo		
1964	Los fenómenos del futbol		
1966	Fiebre de juventud	Don Jaime, padre de Rita y Silvia	
1967	Bromas, S.A.	Sr. Gómez	
1973	'Santo' contra los secuestradores		

1981 "Dos para el camino" (Alejandro)
