= Daniel Godoy =

Venezuelan footballer (born 1981)

Personal information
- Full name: Daniel José Godoy Hurtado
- Date of birth: 13 June 1981 (age 45)
- Place of birth: Caracas, Venezuela
- Height: 1.77 m (5 ft 9 1/2 in)
- Position: Defender

Youth career
- Caracas FC

Senior career*
Years	Team	Apps	(Gls)
2001–2007	Caracas	128	
2007–2008	Guaros FC	39	
2008–2010	Monagas	78	(2)
2010–2011	ACD Lara	18	(1)
2011–2012	Deportivo Petare	32	
2012–2013	Portuguesa	29	(0)
2013–2015	Estudiantes de Mérida	15	(0)
2015–2016	Miami Dade FC	4	(0)
2016–	Miami United	12	(1)

International career
2005–2006	Venezuela	2	(0)
- * Club domestic league appearances and goals

Daniel José Godoy Hurtado (born 13 June 1981) is a former Venezuelan football defender.

== Miami United FC ==
In January 2016, Godoy signed a one-year deal volunteer contract with Miami United FC as a scout and player for the team. He made his debut in the Sunshine Conference of the National Premier Soccer League (NPSL), the fourth tier of the American Soccer Pyramid, in 2017.

== Miami Dade FC ==
In 2015, Godoy signed as one-year deal as a volunteer with Miami Dade FC.
