= Rixon Corozo =

Ecuadorian footballer (born 1981)

Personal information
- Full name: Rixon Javier Corozo Hurtado
- Date of birth: 8 August 1981 (age 45)
- Place of birth: Esmeraldas, Ecuador
- Position: Goalkeeper

Team information
- Current team: El Nacional
- Number: 1

Senior career*
Years	Team	Apps	(Gls)
2000–	El Nacional	15	(0)
2005–2006	→Espoli (loan)	18	(0)
2011	Independiente del Valle	2	(0)
- * Club domestic league appearances and goals as of 8 November 2008

Rixon Javier Corozo Hurtado (born August 8, 1981) is an Ecuadorian footballer who played for El Nacional and Independiente del Valle.
