= Franklin Corozo =

Ecuadorian footballer (born 1981)

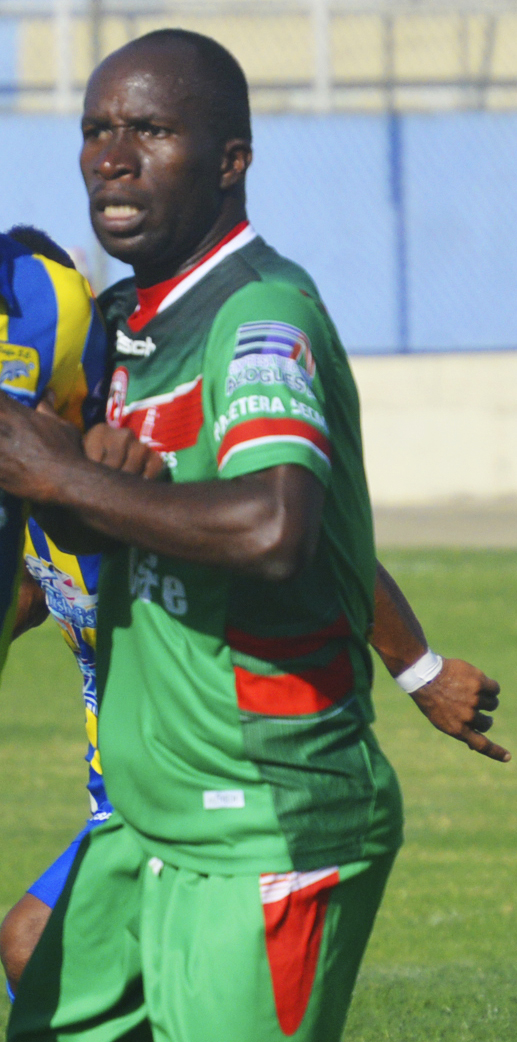

Personal information
- Full name: Franklin Orlando Corozo Quiñónez
- Date of birth: 15 February 1981 (age 45)
- Place of birth: Esmeraldas, Ecuador
- Height: 1.78 m (5 ft 10 in)
- Position: Defender

Team information
- Current team: Deportivo Azogues

Youth career
- 1999–2000: Emelec

Senior career*
Years	Team	Apps	(Gls)
2000–2004	Emelec	130 total	(1)
2005	Barcelona	28	(1)
2006	Emelec	(see above)	
2007	Azogues	41	(1)
2008–2009	Deportivo Quito	51	(1)
2010	Macará	35	(0)
2011	Independiente del Valle	17	(0)
2012	Mushuc Runa	8	(0)
2013	Aucas	27	(0)
2014–	Deportivo Azogues	40	(2)

International career^{‡}
2000–2001	Ecuador U-20	4	(0)
2008–	Ecuador	2	(0)
- * Club domestic league appearances and goals as of 28 July 2009 ‡ National team caps and goals as of 24 December 2008

Franklin Orlando Corozo Quiñónez (born February 15, 1981) is an Ecuadorian footballer currently playing for Deportivo Azogues.

== Club career ==
=== Emelec ===
He wore the Emelec jersey a few times in his career and this time did not score out of many chances. He only had 9 appearances for Emelec but was an important time for his career. He was transferred to Barcelona in 2006.

=== Barcelona ===
During Corozo's stint with Ecuador's most popular club he was not paid attention to and so he had only one appearance. Although that one appearance with the canaries was thought as a good start, he was sold out to arch rivals Emelec yet again.

=== Azogues ===
After Franklin joined Azogues, he had an important role for them. For the first time of his career Franklin was a starter and was used quite often. With only 42 appearances and good defending he attracted many and was a key player for Azogues. Due to this Franklin soon joined Deportivo Quito on January 1, 2008.

=== Deportivo Quito ===
He is an important key player for Deportivo Quito. He instantly became a starter and played many important games. He helped his team qualify for the Copa Sudamericana 2008 by coming in first place in Ecuador's Serie A first phase. During the Sudamericana, he helped his team eliminate Universitario of Peru due to solid defending. As they got up their next rival was San Luis of Mexico. Although his team played an excellent game in Mexico, they lost in the aggregate 4–5. He succeeded in winning the Ecuadorian league of 2008.

== International career ==
Corozo played at the 2001 FIFA World Youth Championship in Argentina, along with notable countrymen Franklin Salas, Segundo Castillo, and Felix Borja. He was called up in December 2008 to play in a quadrangular friendly tournament in Oman.
