= Enrique Godoy Sayán =

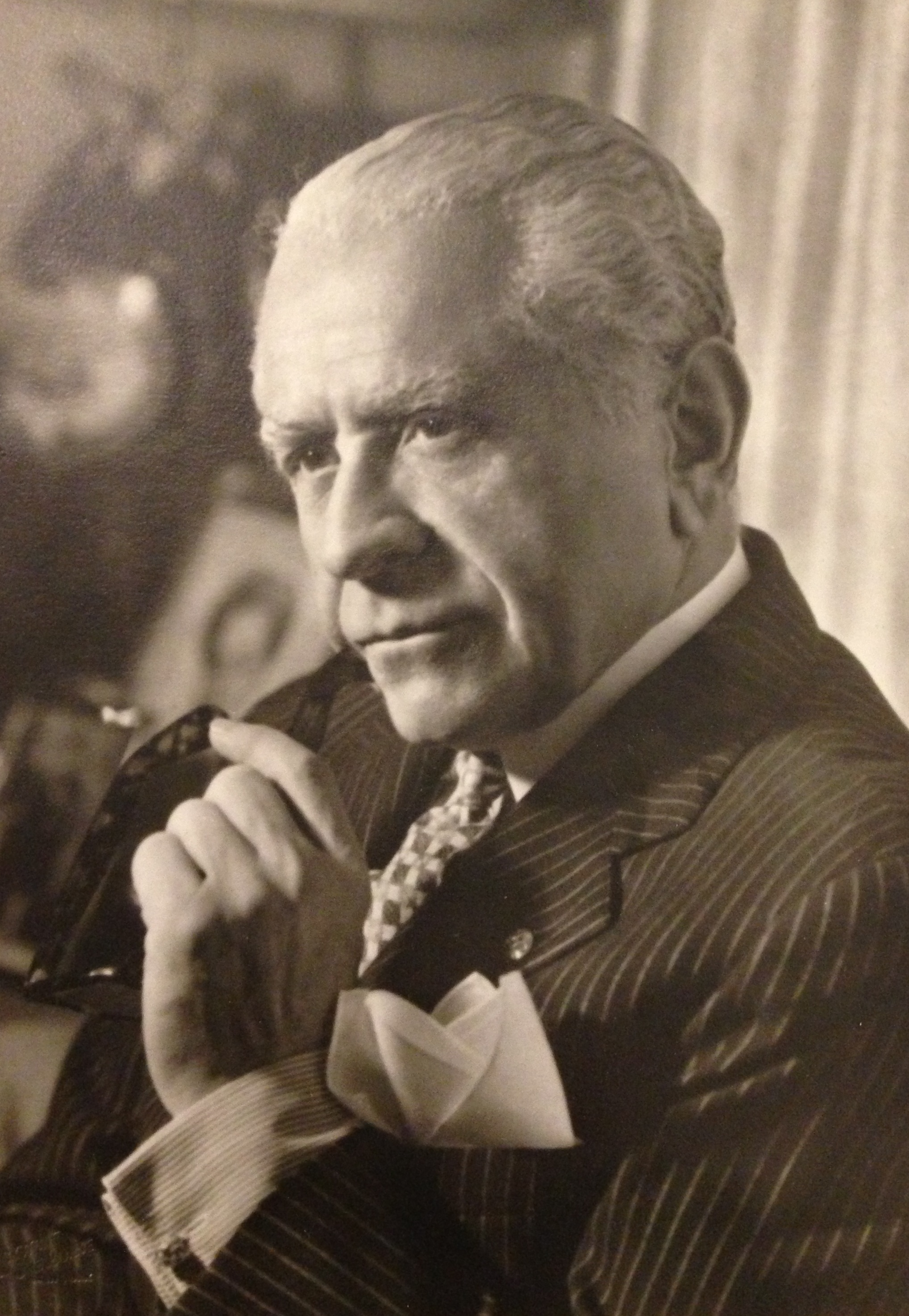
- Born: August 6, 1902; Lima, Perú
- Died: July 15, 1984; Miami, FL
- Occupation: Businessman
- Organization(s): Godoy-Sayán Oficina Aseguradora de Cuba; Banco Godoy Sayán
- Spouse(s): Florence Steinhart (m. 1932-1936), Malvina Arnoldson de Godoy (m. 1937-1984)
- Children: Malvina Godoy Arnoldson; Enrique Godoy Arnoldson

Enrique Godoy Sayán (August 6, 1902 – July 15, 1984) was a Cuban business magnate and banker. He was the founder of the insurance conglomerate Godoy-Sayán Oficina Aseguradora de Cuba Insurance Company, which dominated the insurance industry in Cuba from the 1920s until 1960.

== Early life ==
Enrique Godoy Sayán was born in Lima, Peru in 1902 to Raúl Godoy y Agostini and Angélica Sayán y Palacios. He was sent to Cuba to study at the prestigious and avant-garde school Colegio Inglés de Marianao in 1912. In Cuba, his uncle, the banker and poet Armando Godoy, became his mentor.

== Career ==
He founded Banco Godoy-Sayán de Ahorro y Capitalización in 1954. Godoy revolutionized the insurance industry in Cuba by introducing the fire and allied lines insurance into the island.

After the Cuban Revolution, he moved to Manhattan, New York, where Banco Godoy-Sayan had its United States offices, in 60 Wall Street. Meanwhile, the Godoa Sayan insurance company was seized by the Fidel Castro government in October, 1960. He returned to Spain in 1960 as the European representative of the banking group Crestar Bank, then United Virginia Bank, now merged with Suntrust Bank. In 1964 he bought the financial group ABC de Crédito, the first financial group to introduce credit cards in Spain.

== Personal life ==
Enrique Godoy Sayán was married twice. His first wife was Florence Steinhart, daughter of railway mogul Frank Steinhart, with whom he had no children. In 1937 he married his second wife Malvina Arnoldson de Godoy, daughter of Sweden's General Consul Oscar Arnoldson. He had two children by his second marriage: Malvina Godoy Arnoldson and Enrique Godoy Arnoldson.
