= 2024 Maurice Revello Tournament squads =

International association football tournament

The 2024 Maurice Revello Tournament was an international association football tournament held in Bouches-du-Rhône, France. The ten national teams involved in the tournament were required to register a squad of players; only players in these squads were eligible to take part in the tournament.

== Group A ==
=== France ===
Head coach: (France) Landry Chauvin

No.	Pos.	Player	Date of birth (age)	Club
1	GK	Mathieu Patouillet	20 February 2004 (aged 20)	(French Football Federation) Sochaux
2	DF	Thérence Koudou	13 December 2004 (aged 19)	(French Football Federation) Reims
3	DF	Lucas Mincarelli	5 January 2004 (aged 20)	(French Football Federation) Montpellier
4	DF	Cheick Keita	2 April 2003 (aged 21)	(French Football Federation) Bastia
5	DF	Brahim Traoré	4 February 2004 (aged 20)	(French Football Federation) Caen
6	MF	Mathias De Amorim	10 December 2004 (aged 19)	(French Football Federation) Bordeaux
7	FW	Wilson Odobert	28 November 2004 (aged 19)	(The Football Association) Burnley
8	MF	Andy Diouf	17 May 2003 (aged 21)	(French Football Federation) Lens
9	FW	Matthis Abline	28 March 2003 (aged 21)	(French Football Federation) Nantes
10	FW	Antoine Joujou	12 March 2003 (aged 21)	(French Football Federation) Le Havre
11	FW	Ange-Yoan Bonny	25 October 2003 (aged 20)	(Italian Football Federation) Parma
12	FW	Justin Kalumba	25 December 2004 (aged 19)	(French Football Federation) Angers
13	DF	Dalangunypole Gomis	28 June 2004 (aged 19)	(French Football Federation) Sochaux
14	MF	Noé Lebreton	22 April 2004 (aged 20)	(French Football Federation) Caen
15	MF	Lesley Ugochukwu	26 March 2004 (aged 20)	(The Football Association) Chelsea
16	GK	Yann Lienard	16 March 2003 (aged 21)	(French Football Federation) Monaco
17	DF	Kassoum Ouattara	14 October 2004 (aged 19)	(French Football Federation) Monaco
18	MF	Arthur Atta	14 January 2003 (aged 21)	(French Football Federation) Metz
19	FW	Loum Tchaouna	8 September 2003 (aged 20)	(Italian Football Federation) Salernitana
20	MF	Édouard Michut	4 March 2003 (aged 21)	(Turkish Football Federation) Adana Demirspor
21	GK	Tom Mabon	16 June 2004 (aged 19)	(French Football Federation) Nantes
22	DF	Tanguy Zoukrou	7 May 2003 (aged 21)	(French Football Federation) Troyes
23	DF	William Mikelbrencis	25 February 2004 (aged 20)	(German Football Association) Hamburger SV
24	FW	Alan Virginius	3 January 2003 (aged 21)	(French Football Federation) Clermont
25	MF	Etienne Camara	30 March 2003 (aged 21)	(Royal Belgian Football Association) Charleroi

=== Ivory Coast ===
Head coach: (Ivory Coast) Lassina Dao

No.	Pos.	Player	Date of birth (age)	Club
1	GK	Yvann Konan	16 January 2007 (aged 17)	(French Football Federation) Lyon
2	DF	Goudouss Bamba	7 October 2005 (aged 18)	(Ivorian Football Federation) FC San Pédro
3	DF	Hassane Coulibaly	14 July 2006 (aged 17)	(Ivorian Football Federation) SC Gagnoa
4	DF	Eric Simporé	8 October 2006 (aged 17)	(Ivorian Football Federation) SOA
5	DF	Eroine Agnikoi	10 December 2005 (aged 18)	(Royal Belgian Football Association) Zulte Waregem
6	MF	Abdoulaye Djiré	17 April 2006 (aged 18)	(Ivorian Football Federation) RC Abidjan
7	FW	Bazoumana Touré	2 March 2006 (aged 18)	(Swedish Football Association) Hammarby IF
8	FW	Christ Wawa	27 January 2007 (aged 17)	(Ivorian Football Federation) RC Abidjan
9	FW	Oumar Konaté	5 May 2007 (aged 17)	(Ivorian Football Federation) SOL FC
10	MF	Odilon Kouassi	13 October 2005 (aged 18)	(Danish Football Association) Horsens
11	FW	Patrick Ouotro	13 September 2005 (aged 18)	(French Football Federation) Strasbourg
12	DF	Valy Konaté	14 November 2006 (aged 17)	(Ivorian Football Federation) RC Abidjan
13	MF	Mohamed Koné	3 July 2007 (aged 16)	(Ivorian Football Federation) ASEC Mimosas
14	MF	Abdramane Konaté	25 June 2006 (aged 17)	(Ivorian Football Federation) FC San Pédro
15	MF	Gilbert Bandama	10 June 2006 (aged 17)	(Ivorian Football Federation) RC Abidjan
16	GK	Ulrich Landry Kouassi	20 January 2005 (aged 19)	(Ivorian Football Federation) FC San Pédro
17	FW	Bamalick Bella	27 January 2007 (aged 17)	(French Football Federation) Gazélec Ajaccio
18	DF	Christ Tapé	1 January 2006 (aged 18)	(Ivorian Football Federation) CO Korhogo
19	MF	Cheick Alassane Koné	10 October 2006 (aged 17)	(Ivorian Football Federation) LSCA
20	DF	Luck Zogbé	24 March 2005 (aged 19)	(French Football Federation) Brest
21	MF	Siaka Bamba	11 June 2006 (aged 17)	(Ivorian Football Federation) ESPI
22	DF	Yohan N'Guessan	9 May 2006 (aged 18)	(French Football Federation) Nancy
23	GK	Aboubacar Doumbia	29 June 2007 (aged 16)	(Ivorian Football Federation) RC Abidjan

=== Mexico ===
Head coach: (Mexico) Ricardo Cadena

No.	Pos.	Player	Date of birth (age)	Club
1	GK	Fernando Tapia	17 June 2001 (aged 22)	(Mexican Football Federation) Querétaro
2	DF	Pablo Monroy	22 July 2002 (aged 21)	(Mexican Football Federation) UNAM
3	DF	Jorge Berlanga	18 July 2003 (aged 20)	(Mexican Football Federation) Pachuca
4	DF	Jesús Alcántar	30 July 2003 (aged 20)	(Mexican Football Federation) Necaxa
5	DF	Jorge Rodríguez	3 September 2001 (aged 22)	(Mexican Football Federation) Toluca
6	MF	Fidel Ambríz	21 March 2003 (aged 21)	(Mexican Football Federation) León
7	MF	Diego Medina	12 March 2001 (aged 23)	(Mexican Football Federation) Santos Laguna
8	MF	Denzell García	15 August 2003 (aged 20)	(Mexican Football Federation) Juárez
9	MF	Ettson Ayón	26 March 2001 (aged 23)	(Mexican Football Federation) Querétaro
10	MF	Efraín Álvarez	19 June 2002 (aged 21)	(Mexican Football Federation) Tijuana
11	MF	Alberto Herrera	23 February 2001 (aged 23)	(Mexican Football Federation) Puebla
12	GK	Álex Padilla	1 September 2003 (aged 20)	(Royal Spanish Football Federation) Bilbao Athletic
13	DF	Rodrigo Huescas	18 September 2003 (aged 20)	(Mexican Football Federation) Cruz Azul
14	DF	Tony Leone	28 April 2004 (aged 20)	(Mexican Football Federation) Monterrey
15	DF	Alejandro Gómez	31 January 2002 (aged 22)	(Mexican Football Federation) Tijuana
16	DF	Omar Campos	20 July 2002 (aged 21)	(United States Soccer Federation) Los Angeles FC
17	MF	Diego Gómez	10 September 2003 (aged 20)	(Mexican Football Federation) Necaxa
18	MF	Rodrigo López	12 November 2001 (aged 22)	(Mexican Football Federation) UNAM
19	MF	Ramiro Árciga	30 August 2004 (aged 19)	(Mexican Football Federation) Mazatlán
20	MF	Alan Bautista	11 June 2002 (aged 21)	(Mexican Football Federation) Pachuca
21	GK	Eduardo García	11 July 2002 (aged 21)	(Mexican Football Federation) Tapatío
22	MF	Emilio Rodríguez	21 April 2003 (aged 21)	(Mexican Football Federation) Pachuca
23	FW	Ricardo Monreal	10 February 2001 (aged 23)	(Mexican Football Federation) Necaxa
24	FW	Luca Martínez	5 June 2001 (aged 22)	(Argentine Football Association) Rosario Central

=== Saudi Arabia ===
Head coach: (Saudi Arabia) Saad Al-Shehri

No.	Pos.	Player	Date of birth (age)	Club
1	GK	Ahmad Abu Raseen	2 November 2003 (aged 20)	(Saudi Arabian Football Federation) Al-Hilal
2	DF	Ahmed Al-Julaydan	8 March 2004 (aged 20)	(Saudi Arabian Football Federation) Al-Fateh
3	DF	Mohammed Al-Dossari	31 March 2003 (aged 21)	(Saudi Arabian Football Federation) Al-Ettifaq
4	DF	Mohammed Sulaiman	8 April 2004 (aged 20)	(Saudi Arabian Football Federation) Al-Ahli
5	DF	Khalid Asiri	27 November 2004 (aged 19)	(Saudi Arabian Football Federation) Al-Shabab
6	FW	Meshari Al-Nemer	5 August 2003 (aged 20)	(Saudi Arabian Football Federation) Al-Nassr
7	FW	Muhannad Al-Saad	29 June 2003 (aged 20)	(Saudi Arabian Football Federation) Al-Ettifaq
8	MF	Faisal Al-Asmari	1 August 2003 (aged 20)	(Saudi Arabian Football Federation) Al-Hilal
9	FW	Talal Haji	16 September 2007 (aged 16)	(Saudi Arabian Football Federation) Al-Ittihad
10	MF	Abdullah Al-Zaid	8 January 2004 (aged 20)	(Saudi Arabian Football Federation) Al-Hilal
11	MF	Yaseen Al-Zubaidi	26 April 2003 (aged 21)	(Saudi Arabian Football Federation) Al-Okhdood
12	MF	Salem Al-Najdi	27 January 2003 (aged 21)	(Saudi Arabian Football Federation) Al-Fateh
15	MF	Abdulmalik Al-Oyayari	10 December 2003 (aged 20)	(Saudi Arabian Football Federation) Al-Taawoun
16	MF	Abdulmalik Al-Jaber	7 January 2004 (aged 20)	(Football Association of Bosnia and Herzegovina) Željezničar
17	MF	Abdulkarim Darisi	18 March 2003 (aged 21)	(Saudi Arabian Football Federation) Al-Ahli
18	MF	Zaid Al-Anazi	30 July 2004 (aged 19)	(Saudi Arabian Football Federation) Al-Ahli
19	FW	Yazid Joshan	4 May 2003 (aged 21)	(Saudi Arabian Football Federation) Al-Faisaly
20	MF	Abdulaziz Al-Aliwa	11 February 2004 (aged 20)	(Saudi Arabian Football Federation) Al-Nassr
21	GK	Ammar Al-Ammar	14 August 2003 (aged 20)	(Saudi Arabian Football Federation) Al-Taawoun
22	GK	Turki Ba Al-Jawsh	24 November 2003 (aged 20)	(Saudi Arabian Football Federation) Al-Ettifaq
23	DF	Mohammed Barnawi	7 August 2005 (aged 18)	(Saudi Arabian Football Federation) Al-Hilal
24	MF	Younes Al-Shanqeeti	6 January 2004 (aged 20)	(Saudi Arabian Football Federation) Al-Ahli
25	DF	Mubarak Al-Rajeh	1 August 2003 (aged 20)	(Saudi Arabian Football Federation) Al-Raed
26	DF	Sulaiman Hazazi	1 February 2003 (aged 21)	(Saudi Arabian Football Federation) Al-Qaisumah
28	MF	Othman Al-Othman	15 April 2003 (aged 21)	(Saudi Arabian Football Federation) Al-Fateh
29	DF	Mohammed Abdulrahman	14 January 2003 (aged 21)	(Saudi Arabian Football Federation) Al-Ittihad

=== South Korea ===
Head coach: (South Korea) Choi Jae-young

No.	Pos.	Player	Date of birth (age)	Club
1	GK	Lee Seung-hwan	5 April 2003 (aged 21)	(Korea Football Association) Pohang Steelers
2	DF	Kang Min-jun	8 April 2003 (aged 21)	(Korea Football Association) Korea University
3	DF	Jang Seok-hwan	11 October 2004 (aged 19)	(Korea Football Association) Suwon Samsung Bluewings
6	MF	Hong Gi-wook	20 May 2004 (aged 20)	(Korea Football Association) Ajou University
7	MF	Kim Jeong-hyeon	29 June 2004 (aged 19)	(Korea Football Association) Pohang Steelers
8	MF	Hong Yong-jun	26 March 2003 (aged 21)	(Korea Football Association) Myongji University
9	MF	Baek Ji-ung	29 August 2004 (aged 19)	(Korea Football Association) Jeju International University
10	MF	Jo Jin-ho	10 July 2003 (aged 20)	(Football Association of Serbia) Novi Pazar
11	FW	Jung Seung-bae	9 November 2003 (aged 20)	(Korea Football Association) Suwon FC
12	GK	Kim Dong-hwa	7 May 2003 (aged 21)	(Korea Football Association) Sun Moon University
13	DF	Kang Dong-hyun	29 October 2004 (aged 19)	(Korea Football Association) Honam University
14	FW	Jeon Yu-sang	11 January 2004 (aged 20)	(Korea Football Association) Jeonnam Dragons
15	DF	Lee Chan-ouk	3 February 2003 (aged 21)	(Korea Football Association) Gyeongnam FC
16	MF	Ryu Seung-wan	27 April 2003 (aged 21)	(Korea Football Association) Jeonju University
17	MF	Moon Seong-woo	15 May 2003 (aged 21)	(Korea Football Association) FC Anyang
18	DF	Jung Sung-woo	8 December 2003 (aged 20)	(Korea Football Association) Sun Moon University
19	FW	Park Ju-yeong	23 April 2003 (aged 21)	(Korea Football Association) Jeonbuk Hyundai Motors
21	GK	Han Jun-sung	23 September 2004 (aged 19)	(Korea Football Association) Jeonju University
22	DF	Hwang In-taek	1 April 2003 (aged 21)	(Portuguese Football Federation) Estoril
23	DF	Ahn Jae-min	23 January 2003 (aged 21)	(Korea Football Association) FC Seoul
24	MF	Park Jae-sung	28 February 2003 (aged 21)	(Korea Football Association) Sangji University
25	DF	Hong Sung-min	8 July 2004 (aged 19)	(Korea Football Association) Chungbuk Cheongju
26	FW	Lee Dong-yeol	21 May 2004 (aged 20)	(Korea Football Association) Soongsil University
27	FW	Kim Gun-nam	20 October 2003 (aged 20)	(Korea Football Association) Konkuk University

== Group B ==
=== Indonesia ===
Head coach: (Indonesia) Indra Sjafri

No.	Pos.	Player	Date of birth (age)	Club
1	GK	Ikram Algiffari	6 June 2006 (aged 17)	(Football Association of Indonesia) Semen Padang
2	DF	Ferre Murari	26 July 2005 (aged 18)	(Football Association of Indonesia) Bhayangkara
3	DF	Tim Geypens	21 June 2005 (aged 18)	(Royal Dutch Football Association) Twente
4	DF	Kadek Arel	4 April 2005 (aged 19)	(Football Association of Indonesia) Bali United
5	DF	Dion Markx	29 June 2005 (aged 18)	(Royal Dutch Football Association) NEC Nijmegen
6	DF	Meshaal Hamzah	25 January 2005 (aged 19)	(Football Association of Indonesia) Persija Jakarta
7	MF	Figo Dennis	28 April 2006 (aged 18)	(Football Association of Indonesia) Persija Jakarta
8	FW	Arkhan Kaka	2 September 2007 (aged 16)	(Football Association of Indonesia) Persis Solo
9	FW	Mauresmo Hinoke	26 February 2005 (aged 19)	(Royal Dutch Football Association) FC Dordrecht
10	MF	Ji Da-bin	3 March 2006 (aged 18)	(Football Association of Indonesia) ASIOP
11	FW	Riski Afrisal	25 April 2006 (aged 18)	(Football Association of Indonesia) Madura United
12	MF	Welber Jardim	25 April 2007 (aged 17)	(Brazilian Football Confederation) São Paulo
13	FW	Mufdi Iskandar	1 February 2006 (aged 18)	(Football Association of Indonesia) Persiku Kudus
14	DF	Sulthan Zaky	23 March 2006 (aged 18)	(Football Association of Indonesia) PSM Makassar
15	FW	Taufik Rustam	21 February 2005 (aged 19)	(Football Association of Indonesia) Sada Sumut
16	DF	Dony Tri Pamungkas	11 January 2005 (aged 19)	(Football Association of Indonesia) Persija Jakarta
17	DF	Mufli Hidayat	7 August 2005 (aged 18)	(Football Association of Indonesia) PSM Makassar
18	MF	Toni Firmansyah	14 January 2005 (aged 19)	(Football Association of Indonesia) Persebaya Surabaya
19	FW	Muhammad Ragil	8 May 2005 (aged 19)	(Football Association of Indonesia) Bhayangkara
20	FW	Arlyansyah Abdulmanan	20 December 2005 (aged 18)	(Football Association of Indonesia) Persija Jakarta
21	DF	Iqbal Gwijangge	29 August 2006 (aged 17)	(Football Association of Indonesia) Barito Putera
22	GK	Aditya Ramadhan	20 October 2005 (aged 18)	(Football Association of Indonesia) PSMS Medan
23	FW	Jens Raven	12 October 2005 (aged 18)	(Royal Dutch Football Association) FC Dordrecht
24	MF	Darel Valentino	6 May 2005 (aged 19)	(Football Association of Indonesia) Persib Bandung
25	DF	Alexandro Kamuru	19 August 2005 (aged 18)	(Football Association of Indonesia) Barito Putera
26	MF	Sem Yvel	10 April 2005 (aged 19)	(Royal Dutch Football Association) NAC Breda

=== Italy ===
Head coach: (Italy) Carmine Nunziata

No.	Pos.	Player	Date of birth (age)	Club
1	GK	Gioele Zacchi	10 July 2003 (aged 20)	(Italian Football Federation) Giana Erminio
2	DF	Mattia Zanotti	11 February 2003 (aged 21)	(Swiss Football Association) St. Gallen
3	DF	Riccardo Turicchia	5 February 2003 (aged 21)	(Italian Football Federation) Juventus Next Gen
4	MF	Alessandro Bianco	1 October 2002 (aged 21)	(Italian Football Federation) Reggiana
5	DF	Daniele Ghilardi	6 January 2003 (aged 21)	(Italian Football Federation) Sampdoria
6	DF	Christian Dalle Mura	2 February 2002 (aged 22)	(Italian Football Federation) Ternana
7	MF	Luis Hasa	6 January 2004 (aged 20)	(Italian Football Federation) Juventus Next Gen
8	MF	Franco Tongya	13 March 2002 (aged 22)	(Cyprus Football Association) AEK Larnaca
9	FW	Antonio Raimondo	18 March 2004 (aged 20)	(Italian Football Federation) Ternana
10	FW	Sebastiano Esposito	2 July 2002 (aged 21)	(Italian Football Federation) Sampdoria
11	MF	Cher Ndour	27 July 2004 (aged 19)	(Portuguese Football Federation) Braga
12	GK	Filippo Rinaldi	4 December 2002 (aged 21)	(Italian Football Federation) Olbia
13	DF	Davide Veroli	29 January 2003 (aged 21)	(Italian Football Federation) Catanzaro
14	MF	Giacomo Faticanti	31 July 2004 (aged 19)	(Italian Football Federation) Ternana
15	DF	Alessandro Fontanarosa	7 February 2003 (aged 21)	(Italian Football Federation) Cosenza
16	DF	Nicolò Bertola	23 March 2003 (aged 21)	(Italian Football Federation) Spezia
17	FW	Rachid Kouda	25 July 2002 (aged 21)	(Italian Football Federation) Spezia
18	MF	Niccolò Pisilli	23 September 2004 (aged 19)	(Italian Football Federation) Roma
19	FW	Leonardo Cerri	4 March 2003 (aged 21)	(Italian Football Federation) Juventus Next Gen
20	DF	Giovanni Bonfanti	17 January 2003 (aged 21)	(Italian Football Federation) Atalanta
21	MF	Federico Zuccon	1 April 2004 (aged 20)	(Italian Football Federation) Cosenza
22	GK	Jacopo Sassi	24 July 2003 (aged 20)	(Italian Football Federation) Pro Vercelli
23	MF	Cristian Volpato	15 November 2003 (aged 20)	(Italian Football Federation) Sassuolo
24	MF	Giovanni Fabbian	14 January 2003 (aged 21)	(Italian Football Federation) Bologna
25	FW	Seydou Fini	2 June 2006 (aged 18)	(Royal Belgian Football Association) Standard Liège
26	DF	Edoardo Pieragnolo	3 January 2003 (aged 21)	(Italian Football Federation) Reggiana

=== Japan ===
Head coach: (Japan) Yuzo Funakoshi

Rion Ichihara (Omiya Ardija) was replaced by Shota Kofie due to injury. Sora Hiraga (injury), Ryunosuke Sato, Rei Umeki, Kazunari Kita, Kenshin Yasuda and Yuto Ozeki (all due to club circumstances) left the team during the tournament.

No.	Pos.	Player	Date of birth (age)	Club
1	GK	Keisuke Nakamura	27 April 2005 (aged 19)	(Japan Football Association) Tokyo Verdy
2	DF	Justin Homma	26 August 2005 (aged 18)	(Japan Football Association) Vissel Kobe
3	DF	Niko Takahashi	17 August 2005 (aged 18)	(Royal Spanish Football Federation) Barcelona Juvenil A
4	DF	Harumichi Shiokawa	25 April 2005 (aged 19)	(Japan Football Association) Ryutsu Keizai University
5	DF	Shota Kofie	19 August 2006 (aged 17)	(Japan Football Association) Sanfrecce Hiroshima
6	MF	Kosei Ogura	9 April 2005 (aged 19)	(Japan Football Association) Hosei University
7	MF	Ryunosuke Sato	16 October 2006 (aged 17)	(Japan Football Association) FC Tokyo
8	MF	Kenshin Yasuda	5 March 2005 (aged 19)	(Japan Football Association) Oita Trinita
9	FW	Soma Kanda	29 December 2005 (aged 18)	(Japan Football Association) Kawasaki Frontale
10	MF	Yuto Ozeki	6 February 2005 (aged 19)	(Japan Football Association) Fukushima United
11	MF	Sora Hiraga	2 March 2005 (aged 19)	(Japan Football Association) Kyoto Sanga
12	GK	Wataru Goto	8 May 2006 (aged 18)	(Japan Football Association) FC Tokyo
13	FW	Hisatsugu Ishii	7 July 2005 (aged 18)	(Japan Football Association) Shonan Bellmare
14	FW	Kento Shiogai	26 March 2005 (aged 19)	(Japan Football Association) Keio University
15	MF	Toki Yukutomo	5 January 2005 (aged 19)	(Portuguese Football Federation) Famalicão
16	DF	Rei Umeki	25 August 2005 (aged 18)	(Japan Football Association) FC Imabari
17	DF	Keita Kosugi	18 March 2006 (aged 18)	(Swedish Football Association) Djurgårdens IF
18	MF	Yotaro Nakajima	22 April 2006 (aged 18)	(Japan Football Association) Sanfrecce Hiroshima
19	MF	Rando Hiroi	5 March 2005 (aged 19)	(Japan Football Association) University of Tsukuba
20	DF	Rikuto Kuwahara	21 January 2005 (aged 19)	(Japan Football Association) Meiji University
21	FW	Yutaka Michiwaki	5 April 2006 (aged 18)	(Japan Football Association) Roasso Kumamoto
22	DF	Sotaro Hayashi	25 August 2005 (aged 18)	(Japan Football Association) Waseda University
23	GK	Rui Araki	14 October 2007 (aged 16)	(Japan Football Association) Gamba Osaka
24	DF	Kazunari Kita	16 September 2005 (aged 18)	(Japan Football Association) Kyoto Sanga
25	DF	Kairu Ozaki	27 April 2005 (aged 19)	(Japan Football Association) Waseda University
26	MF	Hiroto Kanda	19 June 2005 (aged 18)	(Japan Football Association) Waseda University

=== Panama ===
Head coach: (Panama) Jorge Dely Valdés

No.	Pos.	Player	Date of birth (age)	Club
1	GK	Miguel Pérez	21 February 2003 (aged 21)	(Panamanian Football Federation) Plaza Amador
2	DF	Aimar Rodríguez	11 September 2002 (aged 21)	(Panamanian Football Federation) San Francisco
3	MF	Jorge Méndez	6 April 2001 (aged 23)	(Panamanian Football Federation) San Francisco
4	MF	Luis Fields	8 March 2003 (aged 21)	(Panamanian Football Federation) Independiente
5	DF	Reyniel Perdomo	28 April 2001 (aged 23)	(Panamanian Football Federation) Alianza
6	MF	Moisés Véliz	18 September 2004 (aged 19)	(Panamanian Football Federation) Tauro
7	MF	Ricardo Phillips	6 May 2001 (aged 23)	(Panamanian Football Federation) Plaza Amador
8	MF	Martín Morán	30 August 2001 (aged 22)	(Bulgarian Football Union) Etar
9	FW	John Jairo Alvarado	7 November 2001 (aged 22)	(Venezuelan Football Federation) Universidad Central
10	MF	Ángel Orelien	2 April 2001 (aged 23)	(French Football Federation) Dunkerque
11	FW	Amable Pinzón	22 February 2002 (aged 22)	(Panamanian Football Federation) Veraguas United
12	GK	Emerson Dimas	10 August 2001 (aged 22)	(Panamanian Football Federation) Potros del Este
13	DF	José Matos	8 March 2002 (aged 22)	(Panamanian Football Federation) Plaza Amador
14	DF	Rodrigo Tello	18 August 2003 (aged 20)	(Panamanian Football Federation) Sporting San Miguelito
15	MF	Edilson Carrasquilla	6 June 2002 (aged 21)	(Panamanian Football Federation) San Francisco
16	DF	Jimar Sánchez	29 November 2003 (aged 20)	(Panamanian Football Federation) Plaza Amador
17	MF	Ariel Arroyo	23 January 2005 (aged 19)	(Panamanian Football Federation) Árabe Unido
18	FW	Yoameth Murillo	7 November 2001 (aged 22)	(Panamanian Football Federation) Potros del Este
19	FW	Davis Contreras	9 December 2001 (aged 22)	(Panamanian Football Federation) Independiente
20	DF	Orman Davis	25 December 2002 (aged 21)	(Panamanian Football Federation) Independiente
21	FW	Kahiser Lenis	23 July 2000 (aged 23)	(Colombian Football Federation) Jaguares
22	MF	Joel Guevara	2 July 2003 (aged 20)	(Panamanian Football Federation) Universitario
23	FW	Gustavo Herrera	18 November 2005 (aged 18)	(Panamanian Football Federation) Sporting San Miguelito
24	MF	Ovidio López	6 March 2002 (aged 22)	(Panamanian Football Federation) Plaza Amador

=== Ukraine ===
Head coach: (Ukraine) Ruslan Rotan

No.	Pos.	Player	Date of birth (age)	Club
1	GK	Ruslan Neshcheret	22 January 2002 (aged 22)	(Ukrainian Association of Football) Dynamo Kyiv
2	DF	Illya Krupskyi	2 October 2004 (aged 19)	(Ukrainian Association of Football) Vorskla Poltava
3	MF	Hennadiy Synchuk	10 July 2006 (aged 17)	(Ukrainian Association of Football) Metalist Kharkiv
4	DF	Oleksandr Drambayev	21 April 2001 (aged 23)	(Croatian Football Federation) Osijek
5	DF	Yevhen Pavlyuk	18 August 2002 (aged 21)	(Ukrainian Association of Football) Vorskla Poltava
6	MF	Denys Shostak	24 January 2003 (aged 21)	(Ukrainian Association of Football) Oleksandriya
7	MF	Oleh Ocheretko	25 May 2003 (aged 21)	(Ukrainian Association of Football) Shakhtar Donetsk
8	MF	Mykola Mykhaylenko	22 May 2001 (aged 23)	(Ukrainian Association of Football) Oleksandriya
9	FW	Danylo Sikan	16 April 2001 (aged 23)	(Ukrainian Association of Football) Shakhtar Donetsk
10	MF	Yehor Yarmolyuk	1 March 2004 (aged 20)	(The Football Association) Brentford
11	MF	Nazar Voloshyn	17 June 2003 (aged 20)	(Ukrainian Association of Football) Dynamo Kyiv
12	GK	Kiril Fesyun	7 August 2002 (aged 21)	(Ukrainian Association of Football) Kolos Kovalivka
13	DF	Volodymyr Salyuk	25 June 2002 (aged 21)	(Ukrainian Association of Football) Chornomorets Odesa
14	MF	Oleh Fedor	23 July 2004 (aged 19)	(Ukrainian Association of Football) Rukh Lviv
15	MF	Kyrylo Siheyev	16 May 2004 (aged 20)	(Ukrainian Association of Football) Oleksandriya
16	DF	Arseniy Batahov	5 March 2002 (aged 22)	(Ukrainian Association of Football) Zorya Luhansk
17	MF	Vladyslav Veleten	1 October 2002 (aged 21)	(Ukrainian Association of Football) Kolos Kovalivka
18	DF	Danil Skorko	6 April 2002 (aged 22)	(Ukrainian Association of Football) Oleksandriya
19	DF	Taras Mykhavko	30 May 2005 (aged 19)	(Ukrainian Association of Football) Dynamo Kyiv
20	FW	Ihor Krasnopir	1 December 2002 (aged 21)	(Ukrainian Association of Football) Obolon Kyiv
21	MF	Maksym Braharu	21 July 2002 (aged 21)	(Ukrainian Association of Football) Chornomorets Odesa
22	MF	Valentyn Rubchynskyi	15 February 2002 (aged 22)	(Ukrainian Association of Football) Dnipro-1
23	GK	Heorhiy Yermakov	28 March 2002 (aged 22)	(Ukrainian Association of Football) Oleksandriya
24	MF	Maksym Khlan	27 January 2003 (aged 21)	(Polish Football Association) Lechia Gdańsk
25	MF	Maksym Kucheriavyi	9 May 2002 (aged 22)	(Scottish Football Association) St Johnstone
26	DF	Oleksandr Martynyuk	25 November 2001 (aged 22)	(Ukrainian Association of Football) Oleksandriya
