= Football at the 2024 Summer Olympics – Men's tournament – Group B =

Group B of the men's football tournament at the 2024 Summer Olympics was played from 24 to 30 July 2024. The group consisted of Argentina, Iraq, Morocco and Ukraine. The top two teams, Morocco and Argentina, advanced to the knockout stage.

== Teams ==
Draw position	Team	Pot	Confederation	Method of qualification	Date of qualification	Olympic appearance	Last appearance	Previous best performance
B1	Argentina	1	CONMEBOL	2024 CONMEBOL Pre-Olympic Tournament top two	11 February 2024	10th	2020	Gold medalists (2004, 2008)
B2	Morocco	2	CAF	2023 U-23 Africa Cup of Nations top three	4 July 2023	8th	2012	Eighth place (1972)
B3	Iraq (Note: The qualifiers from AFC were not known at the time of the draw.)	3	AFC	2024 AFC U-23 Asian Cup top three	2 May 2024	6th	2016	Fourth place (2004)
B4	Ukraine	4	UEFA	2023 UEFA European Under-21 Championship top three	2 July 2023	1st	Debut	

== Standings ==
Pos	Team	Pld	W	D	L	GF	GA	GD	Pts	Qualification
1	Morocco	3	2	0	1	6	3	+3	6 (Note: Head-to-head points: Morocco 3, Argentina 0.)	Advance to knockout stage
2	Argentina	3	2	0	1	6	3	+3	6	Advance to knockout stage
3	Ukraine	3	1	0	2	3	5	−2	3	
4	Iraq	3	1	0	2	3	7	−4	3	

Source: FIFA
Rules for classification: Group stage tiebreakers
Notes:

In the quarter-finals:

- The winners of Group B, Morocco, advanced to play the runners-up of Group A, the United States.
- The runners-up of Group B, Argentina, advanced to play the winners of Group A, France.

== Matches ==
=== Argentina vs Morocco ===
The match had 15 minutes of stoppage time added on. As the game entered the 16th minute of stoppage time, Morocco was leading 2–1 when Argentina took a shot at goal from the edge of the box. This shot was pushed back into the area by Morocco's goalkeeper, leading to another two Argentina attempts hitting the crossbar and falling back into the area in succession, before Cristian Medina was able to head the rebounding ball into the goal and equalise for Argentina. Moroccan fans, feeling that time had elapsed and the game should have ended before Argentina scored, immediately began rioting in the stadium. Spectators stormed the pitch and set off pyrotechnic explosions, leading to the game being suspended amid safety concerns for the players. After the stadium was emptied, the match was resumed behind closed doors in order to play the final three minutes. The match resumed at 19:02, with Argentina's goal disallowed following a VAR review.

24 July 2024
15:00

Argentina	1–2	Morocco
Simeone 68'	Report	Rahimi 45+2', 51' (pen.)

Stade Geoffroy-Guichard, Saint-Étienne
Attendance: 26,717
Referee: Glenn Nyberg (Sweden)

Argentina	Morocco

GK	1	Gerónimo Rulli
RB	4	Joaquín García		(substituted off) 84'
CB	2	Marco Di Cesare	(yellow card) 90+9'
CB	16	Nicolás Otamendi (c)
LB	3	Julio Soler		(substituted off) 69'
RM	10	Thiago Almada
CM	14	Santiago Hezze		(substituted off) 69'
CM	8	Cristian Medina
LM	7	Kevin Zenón		(substituted off) 54'
CF	18	Lucas Beltrán		(substituted off) 69'
CF	9	Julián Álvarez
Substitutes:
GK	12	Leandro Brey
DF	6	Bruno Amione		(substituted on) 69'
DF	13	Gonzalo Luján
MF	5	Ezequiel Fernández	(yellow card) 88'	(substituted on) 69'
MF	11	Claudio Echeverri		(substituted on) 84'
FW	15	Luciano Gondou		(substituted on) 69'
FW	17	Giuliano Simeone		(substituted on) 54'
Manager:
Javier Mascherano

GK	1	Munir Mohamedi	(yellow card) 89'
RB	2	Achraf Hakimi (c)
CB	17	Oussama El Azzouzi		(substituted off) 80'
CB	14	Oussama Targhalline	(yellow card) 87'
LB	11	Zakaria El Ouahdi	(yellow card) 61'
DM	4	Mehdi Boukamir
RM	10	Ilias Akhomach	(yellow card) 39'	(substituted off) 59'
CM	18	Amir Richardson
LM	7	Eliesse Ben Seghir		(substituted off) 80'
CF	8	Bilal El Khannous	(yellow card) 45+3'	(substituted off) 90+2'
CF	9	Soufiane Rahimi	(yellow card) 70'
Substitutes:
GK	12	Rachid Ghanimi
DF	3	Akram Nakach		(substituted on) 80'
DF	5	Adil Tahif
MF	6	Benjamin Bouchouari		(substituted on) 90+2'
MF	13	Yassine Kechta		(substituted on) 80'
FW	15	El Mehdi Maouhoub
FW	16	Abde Ezzalzouli		(substituted on) 59'
Manager:
Tarik Sektioui

Assistant referees:
Mahbod Beigi (Sweden)
Andreas Söderkvist (Sweden)
Fourth official:
Frida Klarlund (Denmark)
Video assistant referee:
Paolo Valeri (Italy)
Assistant video assistant referee:
Ovidiu Hațegan (Romania)

=== Iraq vs Ukraine ===
24 July 2024
19:00

Iraq	2–1	Ukraine
Hussein 57' (pen.); Jasim 75'	Report	Rubchynskyi 53'

Stade de Lyon, Décines-Charpieu
Attendance: 10,637
Referee: Mahmood Ismail (Sudan)

Iraq	Ukraine

GK	1	Hussein Hassan	(yellow card) 90+13'
RB	17	Mustafa Saadoon
CB	6	Zaid Tahseen
CB	20	Hussein Amer	(yellow card) 52'
CB	5	Ahmed Maknzi
LB	3	Hussein Ali		(substituted off) 58'
RM	11	Muntadher Mohammed		(substituted off) 58'
CM	8	Ibrahim Bayesh
CM	10	Youssef Amyn		(substituted off) 79'
LM	14	Karrar Mohammed
CF	18	Aymen Hussein (c)		(substituted off) 90+12'
Substitutes:
GK	12	Kumel Al-Rekabe
DF	2	Josef Al-Imam		(substituted on) 90+12'
DF	13	Karrar Saad		(substituted on) 79'
MF	7	Ali Jasim		(substituted on) 58'
MF	15	Nihad Mohammed		(substituted on) 58'
MF	16	Muntadher Abdul-Amir
FW	9	Hussein Abdullah
Manager:
Radhi Shenaishil

GK	12	Kiril Fesyun
RB	2	Illya Krupskyi
CB	4	Maksym Talovyerov	(yellow card) 56'	(substituted off) 73'
CB	16	Arseniy Batahov
LB	3	Oleksandr Martynyuk
CM	5	Valentyn Rubchynskyi
CM	18	Dmytro Kryskiv	(yellow card) 26'	(substituted off) 79'
CM	8	Mykola Mykhaylenko		(substituted off) 73'
RF	10	Maksym Braharu	(yellow card) 56'	(substituted off) 73'
CF	14	Danylo Sikan (c)		(substituted off) 80'
LF	11	Maksym Khlan
Substitutes:
GK	1	Heorhiy Yermakov
DF	6	Oleksiy Sych		(substituted on) 73'
DF	13	Volodymyr Salyuk		(substituted on) 73'
MF	7	Oleh Ocheretko		(substituted on) 79'
MF	15	Vladyslav Veleten
MF	17	Oleh Fedor		(substituted on) 73'
FW	9	Ihor Krasnopir		(substituted on) 80'
Manager:
Ruslan Rotan

Assistant referees:
Elvis Noupue (Cameroon)
Liban Abdoulrazack Ahmed (Djibouti)
Fourth official:
Shamirah Nabadda (Uganda)
Video assistant referee:
Ivan Bebek (Croatia)
Assistant video assistant referee:
Kate Jacewicz (Australia)

=== Argentina vs Iraq ===
27 July 2024
15:00

Argentina	3–1	Iraq
Almada 14'; Gondou 62'; Fernández 85'	Report	Hussein 45+5'

Stade de Lyon, Décines-Charpieu
Attendance: 30,008
Referee: Espen Eskås (Norway)

Argentina	Iraq

GK	1	Gerónimo Rulli
RB	4	Joaquín García	(yellow card) 50'	(substituted off) 60'
CB	2	Marco Di Cesare
CB	16	Nicolás Otamendi (c)
LB	3	Julio Soler		(substituted off) 60'
RM	10	Thiago Almada		(substituted off) 86'
CM	5	Ezequiel Fernández
CM	14	Santiago Hezze		(substituted off) 60'
LM	8	Cristian Medina
CF	18	Lucas Beltrán		(substituted off) 45+2'
CF	9	Julián Álvarez
Substitutes:
GK	12	Leandro Brey
DF	6	Bruno Amione		(substituted on) 86'
DF	13	Gonzalo Luján		(substituted on) 60'
MF	7	Kevin Zenón		(substituted on) 60'
MF	11	Claudio Echeverri
FW	15	Luciano Gondou	(yellow card) 90'	(substituted on) 60'
FW	17	Giuliano Simeone		(substituted on) 45+2'
Manager:
Javier Mascherano

GK	1	Hussein Hassan
RB	17	Mustafa Saadoon		(substituted off) 60'
CB	20	Hussein Amer
CB	6	Zaid Tahseen	(yellow card) 46'
LB	5	Ahmed Maknzi
CM	8	Ibrahim Bayesh		(substituted off) 76'
CM	14	Karrar Mohammed		(substituted off) 87'
RW	15	Nihad Mohammed	(yellow card) 52'	(substituted off) 60'
AM	7	Ali Jasim		(substituted off) 87'
LW	10	Youssef Amyn
CF	18	Aymen Hussein (c)
Substitutes:
GK	12	Kumel Al-Rekabe
DF	2	Josef Al-Imam
DF	3	Hussein Ali		(substituted on) 60'
DF	13	Karrar Saad		(substituted on) 87'
MF	11	Muntadher Mohammed		(substituted on) 60'
MF	16	Muntadher Abdul-Amir		(substituted on) 76'
FW	9	Hussein Abdullah		(substituted on) 87'
Manager:
Radhi Shenaishil

Assistant referees:
Jan Erik Engan (Norway)
Isaak Bashevkin (Norway)
Fourth official:
Shamirah Nabadda (Uganda)
Video assistant referee:
Rob Dieperink (Netherlands)
Assistant video assistant referee:
Tatiana Guzmán (Nicaragua)

=== Ukraine vs Morocco ===
27 July 2024
17:00

Ukraine	2–1	Morocco
Kryskiv 22'; Krasnopir 90+8'	Report	Rahimi 64' (pen.)

Stade Geoffroy-Guichard, Saint-Étienne
Attendance: 28,655
Referee: Saíd Martínez (Honduras)

Ukraine	Morocco

GK	12	Kiril Fesyun
RB	2	Illya Krupskyi	(yellow card) 79'
CB	13	Volodymyr Salyuk	(red card) 63'
CB	16	Arseniy Batahov
LB	3	Oleksandr Martynyuk		(substituted off) 74'
RM	11	Maksym Khlan	(yellow card) 52'
CM	5	Valentyn Rubchynskyi	(yellow card) 72'
CM	18	Dmytro Kryskiv		(substituted off) 65'
CM	8	Mykola Mykhaylenko		(substituted off) 78'
LM	10	Maksym Braharu		(substituted off) 65'
CF	14	Danylo Sikan (c)	(yellow card) 34'	(substituted off) 65'
Substitutes:
GK	1	Heorhiy Yermakov
DF	4	Maksym Talovyerov		(substituted on) 65'
DF	6	Oleksiy Sych	(yellow card) 90'	(substituted on) 74'
MF	7	Oleh Ocheretko		(substituted on) 65'
MF	15	Vladyslav Veleten
MF	17	Oleh Fedor		(substituted on) 78'
FW	9	Ihor Krasnopir		(substituted on) 65'
Manager:
Ruslan Rotan

GK	1	Munir Mohamedi
RB	2	Achraf Hakimi (c)	(yellow card) 71'
CB	17	Oussama El Azzouzi		(substituted off) 87'
CB	14	Oussama Targhalline
LB	7	Eliesse Ben Seghir		(substituted off) 87'
DM	4	Mehdi Boukamir		(substituted off) 74'
RM	11	Zakaria El Ouahdi
CM	18	Amir Richardson	(yellow card) 37'
LM	16	Abde Ezzalzouli
CF	8	Bilal El Khannous
CF	9	Soufiane Rahimi		(substituted off) 87'
Substitutes:
GK	12	Rachid Ghanimi
DF	3	Akram Nakach		(substituted on) 87'
DF	5	Adil Tahif
MF	6	Benjamin Bouchouari
MF	13	Yassine Kechta		(substituted on) 74'
FW	10	Ilias Akhomach		(substituted on) 87'
FW	15	El Mehdi Maouhoub		(substituted on) 87'
Manager:
Tarik Sektioui

Assistant referees:
Walter López (Honduras)
Christian Ramírez (Honduras)
Fourth official:
Frida Klarlund (Denmark)
Video assistant referee:
Guillermo Pacheco (Mexico)
Assistant video assistant referee:
Jérôme Brisard (France)

=== Ukraine vs Argentina ===
30 July 2024
17:00

Ukraine	0–2	Argentina
	Report	Almada 47'; Echeverri 90+1'

Stade de Lyon, Décines-Charpieu
Attendance: 10,017
Referee: Dahane Beida (Mauritania)

Ukraine	Argentina

GK	12	Kiril Fesyun
RB	2	Illya Krupskyi
CB	4	Maksym Talovyerov
CB	16	Arseniy Batahov
LB	3	Oleksandr Martynyuk		(substituted off) 68'
DM	5	Valentyn Rubchynskyi	(yellow card) 53'
CM	18	Dmytro Kryskiv
CM	8	Mykola Mykhaylenko		(substituted off) 59'
RF	11	Maksym Khlan		(substituted off) 78'
CF	14	Danylo Sikan (c)		(substituted off) 59'
LF	10	Maksym Braharu		(substituted off) 59'
Substitutes:
GK	1	Heorhiy Yermakov
DF	6	Oleksiy Sych		(substituted on) 68'
MF	7	Oleh Ocheretko		(substituted on) 59'
MF	15	Vladyslav Veleten	(yellow card) 82'	(substituted on) 78'
MF	17	Oleh Fedor		(substituted on) 59'
FW	9	Ihor Krasnopir		(substituted on) 59'
Manager:
Ruslan Rotan

GK	1	Gerónimo Rulli
RB	13	Gonzalo Luján
CB	2	Marco Di Cesare
CB	16	Nicolás Otamendi (c)
LB	3	Julio Soler	(substituted off) 67'
RM	17	Giuliano Simeone
CM	5	Ezequiel Fernández	(substituted off) 68'
CM	8	Cristian Medina
LM	10	Thiago Almada	(substituted off) 81'
CF	15	Luciano Gondou	(substituted off) 59'
CF	9	Julián Álvarez	(substituted off) 81'
Substitutes:
GK	12	Leandro Brey
DF	4	Joaquín García
DF	6	Bruno Amione	(substituted on) 67'
MF	7	Kevin Zenón	(substituted on) 68'
MF	11	Claudio Echeverri	(substituted on) 81'
MF	14	Santiago Hezze	(substituted on) 59'
FW	18	Lucas Beltrán	(substituted on) 81'
Manager:
Javier Mascherano

Assistant referees:
Jerson Emiliano dos Santos (Angola)
Stephen Yiembe (Kenya)
Fourth official:
Shamirah Nabadda (Uganda)
Video assistant referee:
Rob Dieperink (Netherlands)
Assistant video assistant referee:
Leodán González (Uruguay)

=== Morocco vs Iraq ===
30 July 2024
17:00

Morocco	3–0	Iraq
Richardson 19'; Rahimi 28'; Ezzalzouli 36'	Report

Stade de Nice, Nice
Attendance: 19,300
Referee: Ramon Abatti (Brazil)

Morocco	Iraq

GK	1	Munir Mohamedi
RB	2	Achraf Hakimi (c)
CB	17	Oussama El Azzouzi	(substituted off) 85'
CB	14	Oussama Targhalline	(substituted off) 62'
LB	11	Zakaria El Ouahdi
DM	4	Mehdi Boukamir
RM	10	Ilias Akhomach	(substituted off) 67'
CM	18	Amir Richardson	(substituted off) 62'
LM	16	Abde Ezzalzouli
CF	8	Bilal El Khannous
CF	9	Soufiane Rahimi	(substituted off) 61'
Substitutes:
GK	12	Rachid Ghanimi
DF	3	Akram Nakach
DF	5	Adil Tahif	(substituted on) 85'
MF	6	Benjamin Bouchouari	(substituted on) 62'
MF	13	Yassine Kechta	(substituted on) 62'
FW	7	Eliesse Ben Seghir	(substituted on) 67'
FW	15	El Mehdi Maouhoub	(substituted on) 61'
Manager:
Tarik Sektioui

GK	1	Hussein Hassan
RB	17	Mustafa Saadoon		(substituted off) 79'
CB	20	Hussein Amer
CB	4	Saad Natiq (c)
LB	5	Ahmed Maknzi	(yellow card) 30'
CM	8	Ibrahim Bayesh
CM	14	Karrar Mohammed	(yellow card) 9'
RW	10	Youssef Amyn		(substituted off) 31'
AM	11	Muntadher Mohammed		(substituted off) 46'
LW	13	Karrar Saad		(substituted off) 32'
CF	18	Aymen Hussein
Substitutes:
GK	12	Kumel Al-Rekabe
DF	2	Josef Al-Imam		(substituted on) 46'
DF	3	Hussein Ali		(substituted on) 79'
MF	7	Ali Jasim		(substituted on) 32'
MF	15	Nihad Mohammed		(substituted on) 31'
MF	16	Muntadher Abdul-Amir
FW	9	Hussein Abdullah
Manager:
Radhi Shenaishil

Assistant referees:
Rafael Alves (Brazil)
Guillerme Camilo (Brazil)
Fourth official:
Veronika Bernatskaia (Kyrgyzstan)
Video assistant referee:
Ivan Bebek (Croatia)
Assistant video assistant referee:
Guillermo Pacheco (Mexico)

== Discipline ==
Fair play points would have been used as a tiebreaker if the overall and head-to-head records of teams were tied. These were calculated based on yellow and red cards received in all group matches as follows:

- first yellow card: minus 1 point;
- indirect red card (second yellow card): minus 3 points;
- direct red card: minus 4 points;
- yellow card and direct red card: minus 5 points;

Only one of the above deductions could be applied to a player in a single match.

Team	Match 1				Match 2				Match 3				Points
Team	Booked	(yellow card) (yellow-red card)	Sent off (straight red)	(yellow card) (red card)	Booked	(yellow card) (yellow-red card)	Sent off (straight red)	(yellow card) (red card)	Booked	(yellow card) (yellow-red card)	Sent off (straight red)	(yellow card) (red card)	Points
Argentina	2				2								–4
Iraq	2				2				2				–6
Morocco	6				2								–8
Ukraine	3				5		1		2				–14
