= 2024 Maurice Revello Tournament =

50ème Festival International "Espoirs" – Tournoi Maurice Revello (in French)

Tournament details
- Host country: France
- Dates: 3–16 June 2024
- Teams: 10 (from 4 confederations)
- Venue: 6 (in 6 host cities)

Final positions
- Champions: Ukraine (1st title)
- Runners-up: Ivory Coast
- Third place: Italy
- Fourth place: France

Tournament statistics
- Matches played: 25
- Goals scored: 75 (3 per match)
- Top scorer: (Japan) Kento Shiogai (5 goals)
- Best player: (Ukraine) Maksym Khlan
- Best goalkeeper: (Ivory Coast) Yvann Konan

The 2024 Maurice Revello Tournament (officially French: 50ème Festival International "Espoirs" – Tournoi Maurice Revello), was the 50th edition of the Maurice Revello Tournament, an annual, international, age-restricted football tournament. Panama were the defending champions.

Ukraine won their first title by defeating Ivory Coast 5–4 in a penalty shoot-out in the final, after the match had finished in a 2–2 draw.

== Participants ==
Ten participating teams were announced on 15 April 2024. Egypt was originally one of the participants until it was announced on 10 May 2024 that they had withdrawn and Indonesia were invited to replace them.

AFC

- Indonesia
- Japan
- Saudi Arabia
- South Korea

CAF

- ~~Egypt~~
- Ivory Coast

CONCACAF

- Mexico
- Panama

UEFA

- France
- Italy
- Ukraine

== Venues ==
A total of six cities hosted the tournament. The ninth place and seventh place play-offs were originally scheduled to take place at the Stade Fernand-Fournier in Arles but, on 10 June 2024, the organization announced that the matches would be held in Saint-Chamas.

2024 Maurice Revello Tournament is located in Provence-Alpes-Côte d'Azur
Arles	Aubagne	Fos-sur-Mer
Stade Fernand-Fournier	Stade de Lattre-de-Tassigny	Stade Parsemain
43.669625°N 4.631786°E	43.2939695°N 5.5623227°E	43.4687854°N 4.9489821°E
Capacity: 2,500	Capacity: 1,000	Capacity: 12,500
Mallemort	Salon-de-Provence	Vitrolles
Stade d'Honneur	Stade d'Honneur Marcel Roustan	Stade Jules-Ladoumègue
43.7241096°N 5.1774767°E	43.6356163°N 5.0928964°E	43.4578485°N 5.2433091°E
Capacity: 720	Capacity: 4,000	Capacity: 1,500

== Match officials ==
The match officials were announced on the tournament's website.

=== Referees ===
AFC

- (Kyrgyzstan) Veronika Bernatskaia
- (Vietnam) Lê Thị Ly

CAF

- (Namibia) Antsino Twanyanyukwa
- (South Africa) Akhona Makalima

CONCACAF

- (Canada) Myriam Marcotte
- (Jamaica) Odette Hamilton

CONMEBOL

- (Ecuador) Susana Corella
- (Peru) Milagros Arruela

UEFA

- (Romania) Iuliana Demetrescu

== Group stage ==
The groups were announced on 10 May 2024. The ten teams were drawn into two groups of five.

=== Group A ===
Pos	Team	Pld	W	D	L	GF	GA	GD	Pts	Qualification
1	Ivory Coast	4	3	0	1	8	3	+5	9	Advance to final
2	France (H)	4	2	1	1	7	4	+3	7	Advance to third place play-off
3	Mexico	4	1	2	1	6	8	−2	7	Advance to fifth place play-off
4	Saudi Arabia	4	2	0	2	5	7	−2	6	Advance to seventh place play-off
5	South Korea	4	0	1	3	1	5	−4	1	Advance to ninth place play-off

Source: Maurice Revello Tournament
(H) Hosts
3 June 2024
14:00

South Korea	0–2	Saudi Arabia
	Report	Al-Zaid 80'; Al-Asmari 90+3'

Stade Jules-Ladoumègue, Vitrolles
Referee: Veronika Bernatskaia (Kyrgyzstan)
3 June 2024
17:30

France	0–2	Ivory Coast
	Report	Bandama 36'; Wawa 63'

Stade Jules-Ladoumègue, Vitrolles
Referee: Myriam Marcotte (Canada)

5 June 2024
14:00

Ivory Coast	2–1	South Korea
Wawa 12'; Ouotro 72'	Report	Hong Yong-jun 90'

Stade Parsemain, Fos-sur-Mer
Referee: Odette Hamilton (Jamaica)
5 June 2024
17:30

Mexico	2–2	France
Ayón 58'; Huescas 86'	Report	Michut 63'; Abline 77'
Penalties
Martínez (penalty scored); Huescas (penalty scored); J. Gómez (penalty scored); D. García (penalty missed); Bautista (penalty scored)	4–3	(penalty scored) Abline; (penalty scored) Michut; (penalty missed) Camara; (penalty scored) Virginius; (penalty missed) Mikelbrencis

Stade Parsemain, Fos-sur-Mer
Referee: Lê Thị Ly (Vietnam)

7 June 2023
14:00

Mexico	3–2	Saudi Arabia
Bautista 34'; Martínez 57' (pen.); E. Rodríguez 71'	Report	Haji 43' (pen.); Alcántar 50' (o.g.)

Stade de Lattre-de-Tassigny, Aubagne
Referee: Milagros Arruela (Peru)
7 June 2024
17:30

France	1–0	South Korea
Virginius 40'	Report

Stade de Lattre-de-Tassigny, Aubagne
Referee: Susana Corella (Ecuador)

9 June 2024
14:00

Ivory Coast	4–1	Mexico
V. Konaté 23'; Ouotro 51'; Bandama 78'; O. Konaté 86'	Report	Monreal 70'

Stade de Lattre-de-Tassigny, Aubagne
Referee: Iuliana Demetrescu (Romania)
9 June 2024
17:30

France	4–0	Saudi Arabia
Keita 21'; Al-Rajeh 86' (o.g.); Lebreton 90+4'; Tchaouna 90+5'	Report

Stade de Lattre-de-Tassigny, Aubagne
Referee: Odette Hamilton (Jamaica)

11 June 2024
14:00

South Korea	0–0	Mexico
	Report
Penalties
Jung Sung-woo (penalty scored); Jo Jin-ho (penalty missed); Moon Seong-woo (penalty scored); Ahn Jae-min (penalty scored)	3–5	(penalty scored) Alcántar; (penalty scored) Ambríz; (penalty scored) Monroy; (penalty scored) J. Rodríguez; (penalty scored) Álvarez

Stade Parsemain, Fos-sur-Mer
Referee: Antsino Twanyanyukwa (Namibia)
11 June 2024
17:30

Ivory Coast	0–1	Saudi Arabia
	Report	Al-Saad 15'

Stade Parsemain, Fos-sur-Mer
Referee: Susana Corella (Ecuador)

=== Group B ===
Pos	Team	Pld	W	D	L	GF	GA	GD	Pts	Qualification
1	Ukraine	4	4	0	0	11	1	+10	12	Advance to final
2	Italy	4	2	1	1	7	9	−2	8	Advance to third place play-off
3	Japan	4	2	0	2	9	7	+2	6	Advance to fifth place play-off
4	Panama	4	1	1	2	6	5	+1	4	Advance to seventh place play-off
5	Indonesia	4	0	0	4	1	12	−11	0	Advance to ninth place play-off

Source: Maurice Revello Tournament
4 June 2024
15:00

Italy	4–3	Japan
Fini 10'; Fabbian 21' (pen.); Raimondo 59', 70'	Report	Shiogai 45', 62', 85'

Stade Jules-Ladoumègue, Vitrolles
Referee: Susana Corella (Ecuador)
4 June 2024
18:00

Indonesia	0–3	Ukraine
	Report	Synchuk 9'; Mykhaylenko 30'; Fedor 59'

Stade Jules-Ladoumègue, Vitrolles
Referee: Akhona Makalima (South Africa)

6 June 2024
15:00

Ukraine	4–0	Italy
Khlan 31'; Martynyuk 53'; Sikan 63'; Voloshyn 71'	Report

Stade de Lattre-de-Tassigny, Aubagne
Referee: Antsino Twanyanyukwa (Namibia)
6 June 2024
18:00

Indonesia	0–4	Panama
	Report	Orelien 21', 57', 68' (pen.); Pinzón 88'

Stade de Lattre-de-Tassigny, Aubagne
Referee: Iuliana Demetrescu (Romania)

8 June 2024
14:00

Japan	4–1	Indonesia
S. Kanda 7', 47'; Sato 66'; Michiwaki 90+4'	Report	Hinoke 70' (pen.)

Stade Parsemain, Fos-sur-Mer
Referee: Myriam Marcotte (Canada)
8 June 2024
17:30

Ukraine	2–0	Panama
Voloshyn 62'; Yarmolyuk 66'	Report

Stade Parsemain, Fos-sur-Mer
Referee: Veronika Bernatskaia (Kyrgyzstan)

10 June 2024
14:30

Ukraine	2–1	Japan
Veleten 42', 55'	Report	Shiogai 81'

Stade de Lattre-de-Tassigny, Aubagne
Referee: Milagros Arruela (Peru)
10 June 2024
18:15

Italy	2–2	Panama
Ndour 40', 90+6'	Report	Phillips 23'; Alvarado 26'
Penalties
Volpato (penalty scored); Cerri (penalty scored); Hasa (penalty scored); Tongya (penalty scored)	4–1	(penalty missed) Tello; (penalty scored) Orelien; (penalty missed) Matos

Stade de Lattre-de-Tassigny, Aubagne
Referee: Lê Thị Ly (Vietnam)

12 June 2024
14:30

Japan	1–0	Panama
S. Kanda 90+3'	Report

Stade d'Honneur Marcel Roustan, Salon-de-Provence
Referee: Akhona Makalima (South Africa)
12 June 2024
18:15

Italy	1–0	Indonesia
Raimondo 38'	Report

Stade d'Honneur Marcel Roustan, Salon-de-Provence
Referee: Odette Hamilton (Jamaica)

== Final stage ==
=== Ninth place play-off ===
14 June 2024
14:00

South Korea	2–1	Indonesia
Jung Seung-bae 48', 59'	Report	Firmansyah 78'

Stade René Gimet, Saint-Chamas
Referee: Akhona Makalima (South Africa)

=== Seventh place play-off ===
14 June 2024
18:00

Saudi Arabia	1–1	Panama
Al-Nemer 77'	Report	Alvarado 8'
Penalties
Al-Julaydan (penalty scored); Al-Zubaidi (penalty scored); Barnawi (penalty scored); Al-Zaid (penalty missed); Al-Jaber (penalty missed)	3–4	(penalty missed) Orelien; (penalty scored) Phillips; (penalty scored) Murillo; (penalty scored) Herrera; (penalty scored) Perdomo

Stade René Gimet, Saint-Chamas
Referee: Iuliana Demetrescu (Romania)

=== Fifth place play-off ===
14 June 2024
17:00

Mexico	1–3	Japan
Árciga 84'	Report	S. Kanda 21'; Shiogai 66'; Ishii 90+7'

Stade d'Honneur, Mallemort
Referee: Susana Corella (Ecuador)

=== Third place play-off ===
16 June 2024
14:30

Italy	1–0	France
Cerri 89'	Report

Stade d'Honneur Marcel Roustan, Salon-de-Provence
Referee: Lê Thị Ly (Vietnam)

=== Final ===
16 June 2024
18:15

Ukraine	2–2	Ivory Coast
Shostak 7'; Khlan 31'	Report	Ouotro 45+3', 59'
Penalties
Khlan (penalty missed); Siheyev (penalty scored); Kucheriavyi (penalty scored); Krasnopir (penalty scored); Yarmolyuk (penalty scored); Batahov (penalty scored)	5–4	(penalty scored) A. Konaté; (penalty scored) G. Bamba; (penalty missed) O. Kouassi; (penalty scored) O. Konaté; (penalty scored) Agnikoi; (penalty missed) Zogbé

Stade d'Honneur Marcel Roustan, Salon-de-Provence
Referee: Myriam Marcotte (Canada)

All times were local CEST

== Statistics ==
=== Goalscorers ===
There were 75 goals scored in 25 matches, for an average of 3 goals per match.

5 goals

- (Japan) Kento Shiogai

4 goals

- (Ivory Coast) Patrick Ouotro
- (Japan) Soma Kanda

3 goals

- (Italy) Antonio Raimondo
- (Panama) Ángel Orelien

2 goals

- (Italy) Cher Ndour
- (Ivory Coast) Gilbert Bandama
- (Ivory Coast) Christ Wawa
- (Panama) John Jairo Alvarado
- (South Korea) Jung Seung-bae
- (Ukraine) Maksym Khlan
- (Ukraine) Vladyslav Veleten
- (Ukraine) Nazar Voloshyn

1 goal

- (France) Matthis Abline
- (France) Cheick Keita
- (France) Noé Lebreton
- (France) Édouard Michut
- (France) Loum Tchaouna
- (France) Alan Virginius
- (Indonesia) Toni Firmansyah
- (Indonesia) Mauresmo Hinoke
- (Italy) Leonardo Cerri
- (Italy) Giovanni Fabbian
- (Italy) Seydou Fini
- (Ivory Coast) Oumar Konaté
- (Ivory Coast) Valy Konaté
- (Japan) Hisatsugu Ishii
- (Japan) Yutaka Michiwaki
- (Japan) Ryunosuke Sato
- (Mexico) Ramiro Árciga
- (Mexico) Ettson Ayón
- (Mexico) Alan Bautista
- (Mexico) Rodrigo Huescas
- (Mexico) Luca Martínez
- (Mexico) Ricardo Monreal
- (Mexico) Miguel Emilio Rodríguez
- (Panama) Ricardo Phillips
- (Panama) Amable Pinzón
- (Saudi Arabia) Faisal Al-Asmari
- (Saudi Arabia) Meshari Al-Nemer
- (Saudi Arabia) Muhannad Al-Saad
- (Saudi Arabia) Abdullah Al-Zaid
- (Saudi Arabia) Talal Haji
- (South Korea) Hong Yong-jun
- (Ukraine) Oleh Fedor
- (Ukraine) Oleksandr Martynyuk
- (Ukraine) Mykola Mykhaylenko
- (Ukraine) Denys Shostak
- (Ukraine) Danylo Sikan
- (Ukraine) Hennadiy Synchuk
- (Ukraine) Yehor Yarmolyuk

1 own goal

- (Mexico) Jesús Alcántar (against Saudi Arabia)
- (Saudi Arabia) Mubarak Al-Rajeh (against France)

== Awards ==
=== Individual awards ===
After the final, the following individual awards were announced.

- Best player: (Ukraine) Maksym Khlan
- Second best player: (Ivory Coast) Odilon Kouassi
- Third best player: (Ivory Coast) Patrick Ouotro
- Best goalkeeper: (Ivory Coast) Yvann Konan
- Topscorer: (Japan) Kento Shiogai
- Opta Revelation: (Ukraine) Hennadiy Synchuk
- Lucarne Opposée Prize: (Ivory Coast) Christ Wawa
- Top assist provider: (Ivory Coast) Christ Wawa

=== Best XI ===
The best XI team was a squad consisting of the eleven most impressive players at the tournament.

Pos.	Player
GK	(Ivory Coast) Yvann Konan
DF	(Ukraine) Hennadiy Synchuk
DF	(Ivory Coast) Eroine Agnikoi
DF	(France) Brahim Traoré
DF	(Ukraine) Oleksandr Drambayev
MF	(Japan) Kosei Ogura
MF	(Ivory Coast) Odilon Kouassi
MF	(Ivory Coast) Christ Wawa
MF	(Ukraine) Maksym Khlan
FW	(Japan) Kento Shiogai
FW	(Ivory Coast) Patrick Ouotro

== See also ==
- 2024 Sud Ladies Cup
