= Hennadiy Synchuk =

Ukrainian footballer (born 2006)

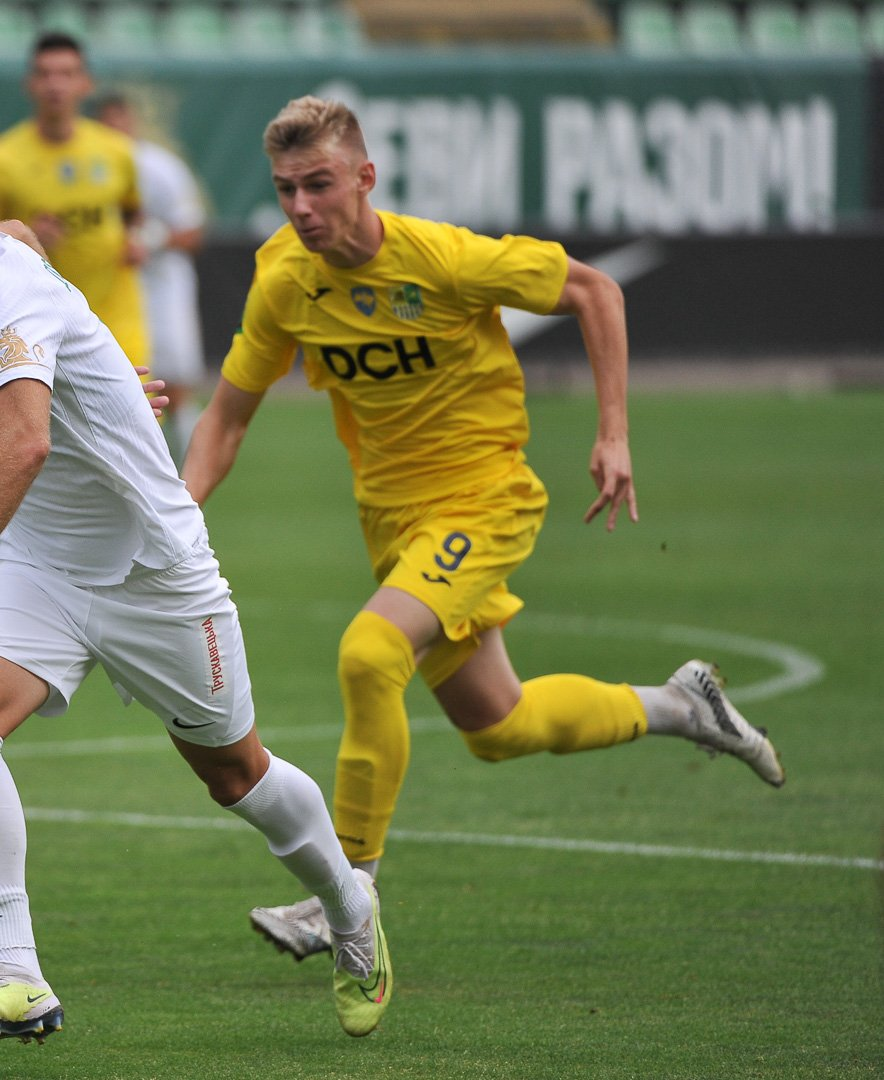

Personal information
- Full name: Hennadiy Hennadiyovych Synchuk
- Date of birth: 10 July 2006 (age 20)
- Place of birth: Manchenky, Kharkiv Oblast, Ukraine
- Height: 1.82 m (6 ft 0 in)
- Position: Midfielder

Team information
- Current team: CF Montréal
- Number: 18

Youth career
- 2015–2016: Metalist Kharkiv
- 2016–2018: Vostok Kharkiv
- 2018–2023: Metalist Kharkiv

Senior career*
Years	Team	Apps	(Gls)
2023–2025	Metalist Kharkiv	36	(1)
2025–	CF Montréal	22	(2)

International career^{‡}
2023	Ukraine U17	5	(0)
2024	Ukraine U19	12	(4)
2025	Ukraine U20	2	(2)
2025–	Ukraine U21	3	(2)
2024	Ukraine U23	2	(1)
2026–	Ukraine	2	(0)
- * Club domestic league appearances and goals as of 20 April 2025 ‡ National team caps and goals as of 18 November 2026

Hennadiy Hennadiyovych Synchuk (Ukrainian: Геннадій Геннадійович Синчук; born 10 July 2006) is a Ukrainian professional footballer who plays as a midfielder for Major League Soccer club CF Montréal and the Ukraine national team.

== Club career ==
=== Early years ===
Born in Manchenky, Kharkiv Oblast, Synchuk began his career in the neighbouring Metalist Kharkiv, before transferring to another Kharkiv football academy Vostok and returning to Metalist two years later.

=== Metalist Kharkiv ===
He made his debut as a second half-time substituted player for Metalist Kharkiv in the Ukrainian Premier League in an away losing match against Dnipro-1 on 3 May 2023.

=== CF Montréal ===
On 28 January 2025, Synchuk was signed by Major League Soccer club CF Montréal with a U22 Initiative contract through the 2028 season, along with an option for another year.

== International career ==
In February 2023, Synchuk was called up to the final squad of the Ukraine national under-17 football team to play in the 2023 UEFA European Under-17 Championship qualification elit round matches.

In March 2024, he was called up by manager Dmytro Mykhaylenko to the final squad of the Ukraine national under-19 football team to play in the 2024 UEFA European Under-19 Championship elit round matches.

In May 2024, he was called up by Ruslan Rotan to the Ukraine Olympic football team squad to play at the 2024 Maurice Revello Tournament in France.

=== International ===
As of match played 17 November 2026

Appearances and goals by national team and year
National team	Year	Apps	Goals
Ukraine	2026	2	0
Total		2	0
