= Yevhen Pavlyuk =

Ukrainian footballer

Personal information
- Full name: Yevhen Serhiyovych Pavlyuk
- Date of birth: 18 August 2002 (age 24)
- Place of birth: Zhytomyr, Ukraine
- Height: 1.85 m (6 ft 1 in)
- Position: Centre-back

Team information
- Current team: Metalist 1925 Kharkiv
- Number: 18

Youth career
- 2015–2018: Molod Poltava
- 2018–2019: Munkach Mukachevo

Senior career*
Years	Team	Apps	(Gls)
2019–2025	Vorskla Poltava	73	(3)
2022	→ Kryvbas Kryvyi Rih (loan)	0	(0)
2025–	Metalist 1925 Kharkiv	29	(2)

International career^{‡}
2023–2024	Ukraine U21	4	(0)
2024	Ukraine U23	6	(0)
- * Club domestic league appearances and goals as of 3 June 2026 ‡ National team caps and goals as of 19 June 2025

Yevhen Serhiyovych Pavlyuk (Ukrainian: Євген Сергійович Павлюк; born 18 August 2002) is a Ukrainian professional footballer who plays as a centre-back for Metalist 1925 Kharkiv.

== Career ==
Pavlyuk is a product of Molod Poltava and MFA Mukacheve youth sportive school systems.

In August 2019 he was signed by Vorskla Poltava. He made his debut as a second half-time substituted player for Vorskla Poltava in the Ukrainian Premier League in a home winning match against SC Dnipro-1 on 19 June 2020.

== International career ==
In May 2024, Pavlyuk was called up by Ruslan Rotan to the Ukraine Olympic football team squad to play at the 2024 Maurice Revello Tournament in France.
