= Denys Shostak =

Ukrainian footballer

Personal information
- Full name: Denys Vadymovych Shostak
- Date of birth: 24 January 2003 (age 23)
- Place of birth: Poltava, Ukraine
- Height: 1.90 m (6 ft 3 in)
- Position: Central midfielder

Team information
- Current team: FC Obolon Kyiv
- Number: 71

Youth career
- 2016–2018: Vorskla Poltava
- 2018–2021: Shakhtar Donetsk

Senior career*
Years	Team	Apps	(Gls)
2021–2023	Shakhtar Donetsk	0	(0)
2021–2022	→ Mariupol (loan)	13	(0)
2022–2023	→ Estoril Praia (loan)	0	(0)
2023–26	Oleksandriya	59	(3)
2026 -	FC Obolon Kyiv	2	(0)

International career^{‡}
2019–2020	Ukraine U17	8	(1)
2021	Ukraine U19	3	(2)
2024	Ukraine U23	5	(1)
- * Club domestic league appearances and goals as of 6/10/26 @ 15:04(AEST) ‡ National team caps and goals as of 26 June 2024

Denys Vadymovych Shostak (Ukrainian: Денис Вадимович Шостак; born 24 January 2003) is a Ukrainian professional footballer who plays as a central midfielder for Oleksandriya.

== Club career ==
Mykytyshyn is a product of Vorskla Poltava and Shakhtar Donetsk youth sportive school systems. He made his debut for Mariupol in the Ukrainian Premier League in the away match against Dnipro-1 on 7 August 2021 which ended with a loss.

== International career ==
On 6 March 2024, Shostak was called up by Ruslan Rotan to the Ukraine Olympic football team preliminary squad as a preparation to the 2024 Summer Olympics.

In June 2024, he took part in the Maurice Revello Tournament in France with Ukraine. He wins the competition by beating Ivory Coast in final.
