= Mauresmo Hinoke =

Dutch footballer

Personal information
- Full name: Hinoke Mauresmo Johannes Jacob Danny Silvinho
- Date of birth: 26 February 2005 (age 21)
- Place of birth: Breda, Netherlands
- Height: 1.75 m (5 ft 9 in)
- Position: Winger

Team information
- Current team: TOP Oss
- Number: 17

Youth career
- –2020: Baronie
- 2020–2023: Dordrecht

Senior career*
Years	Team	Apps	(Gls)
2024	Dordrecht	4	(0)
2024–	TOP Oss	78	(16)

International career
2024	Indonesia U20	5	(1)
- * Club domestic league appearances and goals as of 17 October 2026

Hinoke Mauresmo Johannes Jacob Danny Silvinho (born 26 February 2005) is a professional footballer who plays as a winger for Eerste Divisie club TOP Oss. Born in the Netherlands, he represents Indonesia at youth level.

== Club career ==
Hinoke made his debut for Dordrecht in the early 2024–25 season on an amateur basis.

On 2 September 2024, he signed a three-year professional contract with TOP Oss.

== International career ==
Hinoke was called by coach Indra Sjafri to the Indonesia U20 team to participate at the 2024 Maurice Revello Tournament. On 8 June 2024, he scored a goal against Japan U20, from the penalty spot.

== Personal life ==
Born in the Netherlands, Hinoke is of Indonesian descent.

== Career statistics ==
=== Club ===
As of match played 20 March 2026

Appearances and goals by club, season and competition
Club	Season	League			KNVB Cup		Other		Total	
Club	Season	Division	Apps	Goals	Apps	Goals	Apps	Goals	Apps	Goals
Dordrecht	2024–25	Eerste Divisie	4	0	—		—		4	0
TOP Oss	2024–25	Eerste Divisie	33	2	1	0	—		34	2
TOP Oss	2025–26	Eerste Divisie	30	5	2	0	—		32	5
TOP Oss	Total		63	7	3	0	—		66	7
Career total			67	7	3	0	—		70	7

=== International goals ===
International under-20 goals

As of 8 June 2024

No.	Date	Venue	Opponent	Score	Result	Competition
1.	8 June 2024	Stade Parsemain, France	Japan	1–3	1–4	2024 Maurice Revello Tournament
