= Valy Konaté =

Ivorian footballer

Personal information
- Date of birth: November 14, 2006 (age 19)
- Place of birth: Bouaké, Ivory Coast
- Height: 1.82 m (6 ft 0 in)
- Position: Left-back

Team information
- Current team: Cercle Brugge, on loan from Monaco
- Number: 12

Youth career
- 2014–2019: CF Djamourou Bouaké
- 2019–2025: RC Abidjan

Senior career*
Years	Team	Apps	(Gls)
2025–	Monaco	0	(0)
2025	→ Jong Cercle (loan)	1	(0)
2025–2027	→ Cercle Brugge (loan)	13	(0)

International career
2024	Ivory Coast U20	5	(1)
2023–2024	Ivory Coast U23	4	(0)
- * Club domestic league appearances and goals as of 19 July 2026

Valy Konaté (born 14 November 2006) is an Ivorian footballer who plays as a left back for Cercle Brugge, on loan from AS Monaco.

== Club career ==
Konaté joined the youth academy Centre de Formation de Djamourou Bouaké at the age of 8, and moved to RC Abidjan in 2019 to finish his development. He started playing with their senior team at the age of 15. He signed for AS Monaco on 16 January 2025 on a contract until 2029. On 24 June 2025, he joined Cercle Brugge in the Belgian Pro League on a season-long loan. In June 2026, his loan with Cercle Brugge was extended for a further season.

== International career ==
Konaté has represented the Ivory Coast U20s at the 2024 Maurice Revello Tournament.
