= Yassine Kechta =

Moroccan footballer (born 2002)

Personal information
- Date of birth: 25 February 2002 (age 24)
- Place of birth: Paris, France
- Height: 1.74 m (5 ft 9 in)
- Position: Midfielder

Team information
- Current team: Leganés
- Number: 8

Youth career
- Paris FC
- Le Havre

Senior career*
Years	Team	Apps	(Gls)
2019–2022	Le Havre B	33	(3)
2021–2026	Le Havre	121	(6)
2026–	Leganés	0	(0)

International career^{‡}
2018–2019	Morocco U17	5	(0)
2020–2021	Morocco U20	6	(0)
2023–	Morocco U23	12	(1)
Medal record
Men's football
Representing Morocco
Olympic Games
Bronze medal – third place	2024 Paris	Team
- * Club domestic league appearances and goals as of 17 May 2026 ‡ National team caps and goals as of 23:12, 2 August 2024 (UTC)

Yassine Kechta (born 25 February 2002) is a professional footballer who plays as a midfielder for Segunda División club Leganés. Born in France, he represents Morocco at youth international level.

== Club career ==
Kechta started his career in the Parisian region being part of the youth teams from Racing Club and Paris FC before arriving at Le Havre. There, he came through the ranks of Le Havre academy, notably reaching the last 16 of the Coupe Gambardella in 2019, as he was only 15 years old. He made his professional debut for Le Havre on 15 May 2021, replacing Arouna Sangante in the Ligue 2 home 3–2 win against the league champions of Troyes.

On 12 July 2026, Kechta moved abroad and signed a four-year contract with Segunda División side Leganés.

== International career ==
Kechta is a youth international for Morocco. He took part in the 2018 UNAF U-17 Tournament with Morocco youth team, who reached the final at home. He later was a member of the Moroccan squad who went to the 2019 Africa U-17 Cup of Nations in Tanzania.

In 2021, when youth international football resumed after the pandemic interruption, he was part of the Moroccan squad that reached the quarter-finals of the 2021 Africa U-20 Cup of Nations.

== Career statistics ==
As of match played 17 May 2026

Appearances and goals by club, season and competition
Club	Season	League			Cup		Europe		Other		Total	
Club	Season	Division	Apps	Goals	Apps	Goals	Apps	Goals	Apps	Goals	Apps	Goals
Le Havre II	2018–19	CFA 2	5	0	—		—		—		5	0
Le Havre II	2019–20	National 3	7	0	—		—		—		7	0
Le Havre II	2020–21	National 3	5	1	—		—		—		5	1
Le Havre II	2021–22	National 3	17	3	—		—		—		17	3
Le Havre II	Total		34	4	—		—		—		34	4
Le Havre	2020–21	Ligue 2	1	0	0	0	—		—		1	0
Le Havre	2021–22	Ligue 2	0	0	1	0	—		—		1	0
Le Havre	2022–23	Ligue 2	28	1	1	0	—		—		29	1
Le Havre	2023–24	Ligue 1	32	2	3	0	—		—		35	2
Le Havre	2024–25	Ligue 1	30	1	0	0	—		—		30	1
Le Havre	2025–26	Ligue 1	30	2	1	0	—		—		31	2
Le Havre	Total		121	6	6	0	—		—		127	6
Career total			155	10	6	0	0	0	0	0	161	10

== Honours ==
Morocco U23

- Summer Olympics Bronze Medal: 2024
