= Luck Zogbé =

Ivorian footballer (born 2005)

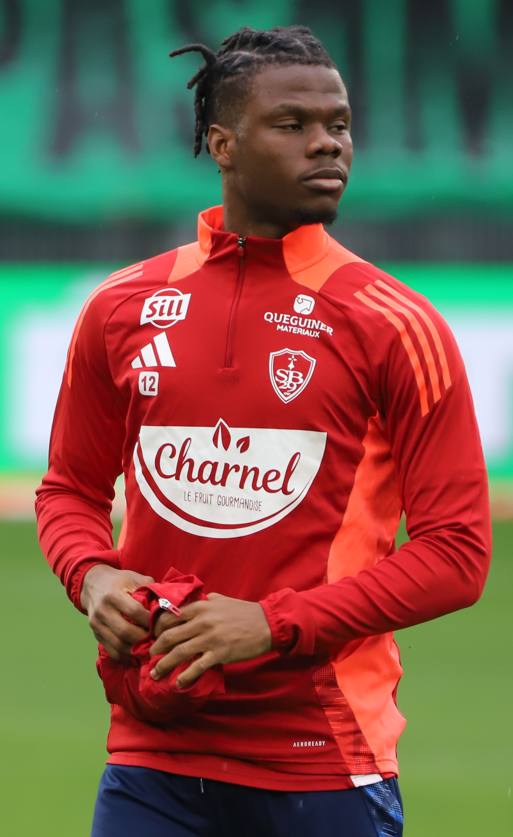
- Zogbé with Brest in 2025

Personal information
- Date of birth: 24 March 2005 (age 21)
- Place of birth: Ivory Coast
- Height: 1.78 m (5 ft 10 in)
- Position: Right-back

Team information
- Current team: Brest
- Number: 12

Senior career*
Years	Team	Apps	(Gls)
–2023	LYS Sassandra		
2023–	Brest	23	(0)

International career^{‡}
2024–	Ivory Coast U20	3	(0)
2023–	Ivory Coast U23	4	(0)
2025–	Ivory Coast	9	(1)
- * Club domestic league appearances and goals as of 19 May 2026 ‡ National team caps and goals as of 17 November 2026

Luck Zogbé (born 24 March 2005) is an Ivorian professional footballer who plays as a right-back for Ligue 1 club Brest and the Ivory Coast national team.

== Club career ==
Following the expiration of his contract at Ivorian club LYS Sassandra, Zogbé became a free agent. On 15 August 2023, he was invited by Ligue 1 club Brest to complete trials with the first team. Two months later on 26 October, he signed a four-season professional contract with the club. He made his senior debut for Brest in a 2–1 win over Trélissac in the Coupe de France round of 32 on 20 January 2024. On 14 April 2024, Zogbé made his Ligue 1 debut in a 4–3 defeat away to Lyon, coming on as a substitute at the 80th minute.

== International career ==
On 14 March 2024, Zogbé received his second call-up to the Ivory Coast under-23s, having already played for the team in June 2023.

== Honours ==
Ivory Coast U20

- Maurice Revello Tournament runner-up: 2024
