= Kiril Fesyun =

Ukrainian footballer

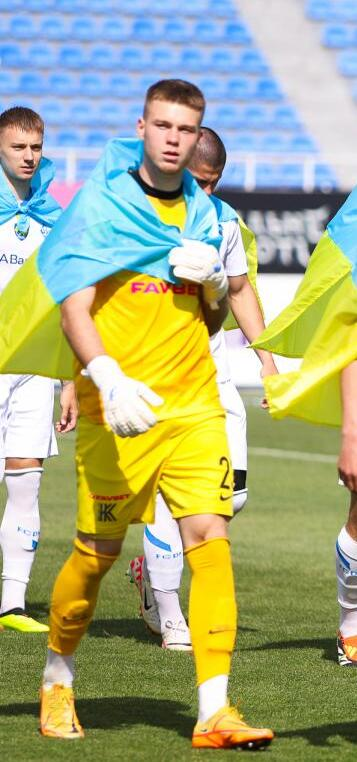
- Fesyun in 2024

Personal information
- Full name: Kiril Vadymovych Fesyun
- Date of birth: 7 August 2002 (age 24)
- Place of birth: Chernihiv, Ukraine
- Height: 1.91 m (6 ft 3 in)
- Position: Goalkeeper

Team information
- Current team: Shakhtar Donetsk
- Number: 23

Youth career
- 2015–2019: Yunist Chernihiv

Senior career*
Years	Team	Apps	(Gls)
2019	Yunist Chernihiv	5	(0)
2019–2021	Vorskla Poltava	0	(0)
2021–2024	Kolos Kovalivka	35	(0)
2024–	Shakhtar Donetsk	9	(0)

International career
2021–2023	Ukraine U21	7	(0)
2024	Ukraine U23	8	(0)
- * Club domestic league appearances and goals as of 21 May 2026

Kiril Vadymovych Fesyun (Ukrainian: Кіріл Вадимович Фесюн; born 7 August 2002) is a Ukrainian professional footballer who plays as a goalkeeper for Ukrainian Premier League club Shakhtar Donetsk.

== Club career ==
=== Yunist Chernihiv ===
Born in Chernihiv, Fesyun is a product of the local Yunist Chernihiv.

=== Kolos Kovalivka ===
He played for FC Vorskla in the Ukrainian Premier League Reserves, and in March 2021 he transferred to Kolos Kovalivka in the Ukrainian Premier League. He made his debut as a starter against Inhulets Petrove on 18 September.

=== Shakhtar Donetsk ===
Fesyun transferred to Ukrainian Premier League champions Shakhtar Donetsk in July 2024.

== International career ==
On 15 May 2022, Fesyun was called up to the Ukraine under-21 squad.

On 6 March 2024, he was called up to the Ukraine Olympic football team preliminary squad as a preparation to the 2024 Summer Olympics.

In May 2024, he was called up again by Ruslan Rotan to the Ukraine Olympic football team squad to play at the 2024 Maurice Revello Tournament in France.

== Career statistics ==
As of match played 17 September 2026

Appearances and goals by club, season and competition
Club	Season	League			Ukrainian Cup		Europe		Other		Total	
Club	Season	Division	Apps	Goals	Apps	Goals	Apps	Goals	Apps	Goals	Apps	Goals
Kolos Kovalivka	2021–22	Ukrainian Premier League	5	0	0	0	0	0	0	0	5	0
Kolos Kovalivka	2022–23	Ukrainian Premier League	1	0	0	0	—		0	0	1	0
Kolos Kovalivka	2023–24	Ukrainian Premier League	29	0	0	0	—		0	0	29	0
Kolos Kovalivka	Total		35	0	0	0	0	0	0	0	35	0
Shakhtar Donetsk	2024–25	Ukrainian Premier League	6	0	0	0	0	0	0	0	6	0
Shakhtar Donetsk	2025–26	Ukrainian Premier League	3	0	1	0	4 (Note: Appearances in UEFA Conference League)	0	0	0	8	0
Shakhtar Donetsk	2026–27	Ukrainian Premier League	0	0	1	0	0	0	—		1	0
Shakhtar Donetsk	Total		9	0	2	0	4	0	0	0	15	0
Career total			44	0	2	0	4	0	0	0	50	0

== Honours ==
Shakhtar Donetsk

- Ukrainian Premier League: 2025–26
- Ukrainian Cup: 2024–25

Ukraine U23

- Maurice Revello Tournament: 2024
