= Ramiro Árciga =

Mexican footballer (born 2004)

Personal information
- Full name: Ramiro Árciga Zárate
- Date of birth: 30 August 2004 (age 22)
- Place of birth: La Piedad, Michoacán, Mexico
- Height: 1.75 m (5 ft 9 in)
- Position: Attacking midfielder

Team information
- Current team: Tijuana
- Number: 17

Youth career
- 2019–2020: Morelia
- 2020–2023: Mazatlán

Senior career*
Years	Team	Apps	(Gls)
2023–2024	Mazatlán	27	(0)
2025–	Tijuana	62	(4)

International career
2023–2024	Mexico U23	12	(4)
2024–	Mexico	1	(0)
Medal record
Men's football
Representing Mexico
Pan American Games
Bronze medal – third place	2023 Santiago	Team
- * Club domestic league appearances and goals as of 20 November 2026

Ramiro Árciga Zárate (born 30 August 2004) is a Mexican professional footballer who plays as an attacking midfielder for Liga MX club Tijuana.

== Club career ==
Árciga began his career in 2019 as part of Monarcas Morelia youth academy. In June 2020, this club became Mazatlán, so Árciga continued to be part of the new club's youth squads.

Árciga made his debut for Mazatlán on 25 July 2023 against Juárez on the 2023 Leagues Cup. On 18 August 2023 he made his league debut against León, being one of the eleven starting players.

In January 2025, Árciga signed with Liga MX team Tijuana.

== International career ==
=== Youth ===
Árciga played for the Mexico national under-23 football team between 2023 and 2024, taking part in the 2023 Pan American Games, the 2024 Maurice Revello Tournament and some friendly matches. At the Pan American Games he won the bronze medal.

=== Senior ===
He made his debut for the Mexico national team on 31 May 2024 in a friendly match against Bolivia.

== Career statistics ==
=== Club ===
As of match played on 20 November 2026

Appearances and goals by club, season and competition
Club	Season	League			Cup		Continental		Other		Total	
Club	Season	Division	Apps	Goals	Apps	Goals	Apps	Goals	Apps	Goals	Apps	Goals
Mazatlán	2023–24	Liga MX	10	0	—		—		2 (Note: Appearances in Leagues Cup)	0	12	0
Mazatlán	2024–25	Liga MX	17	0	—		—		5	2	22	2
Mazatlán	Total		27	0	—		—		7	2	34	2
Tijuana	2024–25	Liga MX	9	0	—		—		—		9	0
Tijuana	2025–26	Liga MX	36	3	—		—		2	1	38	4
Tijuana	2026–27	Liga MX	17	1	—		—		2	0	19	1
Tijuana	Total		62	4	—		—		4	1	66	5
Career total			89	4	0	0	0	0	11	3	100	7

=== International ===
As of match played on 31 May 2024

Appearances and goals by national team and year
National team	Year	Apps	Goals
Mexico	2024	1	0
Total		1	0

== Honours ==
Mexico U23

- Pan American Bronze Medal: 2023
