= Kento Shiogai =

Japanese footballer (born 2005)

Personal information
- Date of birth: 26 March 2005 (age 21)
- Place of birth: Tokyo, Japan
- Height: 1.80 m (5 ft 11 in)
- Position: Forward

Team information
- Current team: VfL Wolfsburg
- Number: 7

Youth career
- Buddy SC Koto
- 2019–2021: Yokohama FC
- 2020–2022: Kokugakuin Univ. Kugayama High School

College career
Years	Team	Apps	(Gls)
2023–2024	Keio University		

Senior career*
Years	Team	Apps	(Gls)
2024	Yokohama F. Marinos	7	(1)
2024–2026	NEC	37	(11)
2026–	VfL Wolfsburg	17	(1)

International career^{‡}
2023	Japan U18	9	(4)
2023–2024	Japan U19	9	(6)
2025–	Japan U23	3	(0)
2026–	Japan	6	(1)
- * Club domestic league appearances and goals as of 12 September 2026 ‡ National team caps and goals as of 5 October 2026

Kento Shiogai (塩貝 健人, Shiogai Kento; born 26 March 2005) is a Japanese professional footballer who plays as a forward for 2. Bundesliga club VfL Wolfsburg and the Japan national team.

== Club career ==
=== High school ===
Shiogai played on Buddy SC Koto (U-12), and on Yokohama FC U-15s. On Yokohama FC, he barely played, and failed to win promotion to its U-18s. It was on high school football, though, that he gained prominence and national relevance. Playing for Kokugakuin University Kugayama High School, he was its captain on his third year of high school. He started to be highlighted by media during the end of 2023, when his team won the Tokyo preliminaries for the 2023 All Japan High School Soccer Tournament. His performances on the preliminaries included decisive goals for Kokugakuin Kugayama, finished off with a brace against Teikyo High School in the match that qualified them to the national tournament. He stated that he wanted to win the national tournament, and being its top scorer, prior to the start of the tournament.

Participating for the first and last time on the national tournament on 2023, the then-third grader scored a goal on its first match, against Kindai Wakayama, qualifying them to the third round. In a difficult match against the eventual champions Okayama Gakugeikan, he failed to score on the 0–0 draw and missed a penalty in the 5–3 shoot-out loss.

Despite the loss, Shiogai was noted as one of the nation's best prospects, and selected as one of the 36 best players of the tournament. As expected, he was selected for the Japan High School squad of the year. Representing them, he played the "FUJIFILM Super Cup Next Generation Match" against the U-18s of Yokohama F. Marinos, scoring a brace, and participated in both the Denso Cup Challenge and the U-19 Youth Soccer Tournament in Düsseldorf.

=== University and Yokohama F. Marinos ===
Shiogai joined Keio University on 2023, studying on the Department of Political Science, Faculty of Law, and playing for its football team. He was gifted the number 10 on his first-year, before changing to the number 9 on his second. Scoring 15 goals in his first league season, Shiogai helped Keio to win promotion for the 2nd division of the Kanto University League.

On 25 January 2024, he was announced by Yokohama F. Marinos as their first signing of the 2027 season, and was immediately registered in the specially-designated player program, which allowed him to play for Marinos in J.League-approved competitions. On 10 April 2024, he made his debut for Marinos against Gamba Osaka in a 2–0 win, in which he was subbed on at the 67th minute. He started a match for Marinos in their following match, played against Shonan Bellmare. Making a lasting impression, he played 57 minutes, scoring his first professional goal on the 21st.

=== NEC ===
On 28 August 2024, Shiogai signed a four-year contract with NEC in the Netherlands, joining his compatriots Koki Ogawa and Kodai Sano at the club.

=== Wolfsburg ===
On 20 January 2026, Shiogai joined Bundesliga side VfL Wolfsburg on a four-and-a-half-year contract.

== International career ==
Shiogai represented Japan U-18s on their 2023 activities, which happened in the second semester. He was featured on all three call-ups, and scored four goals in nine matches across the 2023 SBS Cup, friendlies played in November and the Ibaraki Next Generation Cup.

He was called up for the U-19 for three friendlies in March 2024, scoring a goal in its first. Continuing to represent the 2005 generation on the Japan youth set-ups with consecutive call-ups, he was called up for the 2024 Maurice Revello Tournament. He scored five goals in five matches, including a hat-trick against Italy, helping Japan to place fifth out of 12 teams, and winning the tournament's top scorer award.

On 15 May 2026, Shiogai was selected in the 26-man squad for the 2026 FIFA World Cup.

== Career statistics ==
=== Club ===
As of match played 12 September 2026

Appearances and goals by club, season and competition
Club	Season	League			National cup		League cup		Other		Total	
Club	Season	Division	Apps	Goals	Apps	Goals	Apps	Goals	Apps	Goals	Apps	Goals
Yokohama F. Marinos	2024	J1 League	7	1	–		0	0	–		7	1
NEC Nijmegen	2024–25	Eredivisie	25	4	2	1	–		1 (Note: Appearance in Eredivisie European play-offs)	0	28	5
NEC Nijmegen	2025–26	Eredivisie	12	7	2	2	–		–		14	9
NEC Nijmegen	Total		37	11	4	3	–		1	0	42	14
VfL Wolfsburg	2025–26	Bundesliga	12	1	0	0	–		1 (Note: Appearance in Bundesliga promotion play-offs)	0	13	1
VfL Wolfsburg	2026–27	2. Bundesliga	5	0	1	0	–		–		6	0
VfL Wolfsburg	Total		17	1	1	0	–		1	0	19	1
Career total			61	13	5	3	0	0	2	0	68	16

=== International ===
As of match played 5 October 2026

Appearances and goals by national team and year
National team	Year	Apps	Goals
Japan	2026	6	1
Total		6	1

Scores and results list Japan's goal tally first, score column indicates score after each Shiogai goal.

List of international goals scored by Kento Shiogai
No.	Date	Venue	Opponent	Score	Result	Competition
1	24 September 2026	Q&A Stadium, Rifu, Japan	Uruguay	2–1	3–1	2026 Kirin Challenge Cup
