= Heorhiy Yermakov =

Ukrainian footballer

Personal information
- Full name: Heorhiy Serhiyovych Yermakov
- Date of birth: 28 March 2002 (age 24)
- Place of birth: Kyiv, Ukraine
- Height: 1.90 m (6 ft 3 in)
- Position: Goalkeeper

Team information
- Current team: Kharkiv
- Number: 1

Youth career
- 2015–2019: Youth Sportive School #15 Kyiv

Senior career*
Years	Team	Apps	(Gls)
2019–2021	Shakhtar Donetsk	0	(0)
2021–2024	Oleksandriya	8	(0)
2024–2026	Maccabi Haifa	32	(0)
2024–2025	→ Oleksandriya (loan)	30	(0)
2026–	Kharkiv	0	(0)

International career^{‡}
2024–2025	Ukraine U21	3	(0)
2024	Ukraine U23	4	(0)
- * Club domestic league appearances and goals as of 31 May 2026 ‡ National team caps and goals as of 19 June 2025

Heorhiy Serhiyovych Yermakov (Ukrainian: Георгій Сергійович Єрмаков; born 28 March 2002) is a Ukrainian professional footballer who plays as a goalkeeper for Ukrainian club Kharkiv.

== Career ==
Born in Kyiv in a Ukrainian Jewish family, his parents emigrated to Holon, Israel shortly after Russo-Ukrainian War started. Yermakov is a product of the local Youth Sportive School #15, where he was trained from 2015 until 2019. In August 2019 he was signed up by Shakhtar Donetsk and played in the Ukrainian Premier League Reserves. In March 2021 he went on loan to the Ukrainian Premier League club Oleksandriya and later, in July of the same year signed a permanent contract.

Yermakov made his debut for the main team of Oleksandriya on 26 September 2023 in a victorious (1:0) away match of the 1/8 finals of the Ukrainian Cup against Rukh Lviv, when he entered the field in the starting lineup and played the entire match.

He made his debut in the Ukrainian Premier League as a starter against Dynamo Kyiv in a lost (2:4) away match on 1 October 2023.

== International career ==
On 6 March 2024, Yermakov was called up by Ruslan Rotan to the Ukraine Olympic football team preliminary squad as a preparation to the 2024 Summer Olympics.

In May 2024, he was called up again by Ruslan Rotan to the Ukraine Olympic football team squad to play at the 2024 Maurice Revello Tournament in France.
