= Ricardo Monreal (footballer) =

Mexican footballer (born 2001)

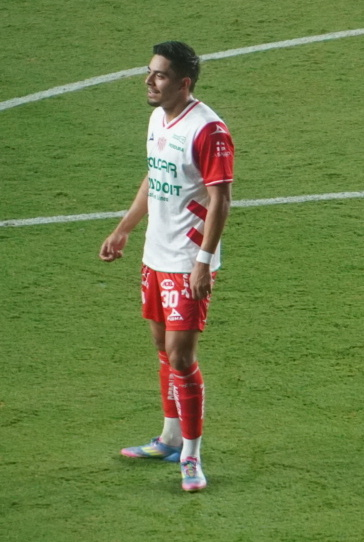
- Monreal with Necaxa in 2025

Personal information
- Full name: Ricardo Saúl Monreal Morales
- Date of birth: 10 February 2001 (age 25)
- Place of birth: Zacatecas, Mexico
- Height: 1.80 m (5 ft 11 in)
- Position: Forward

Team information
- Current team: Tigres UANL
- Number: 21

Youth career
- 2014: Oaxaca
- 2016–2017: Atlas

Senior career*
Years	Team	Apps	(Gls)
2017–2018	Oaxaca	10	(1)
2018–2026	Necaxa	124	(12)
2020–2021	→ Oaxaca (loan)	30	(5)
2021–2022	→ Pumas Tabasco (loan)	26	(2)
2026–	Tigres UANL	10	(0)

International career^{‡}
2019	Mexico U18	2	(1)
2020	Mexico U20	2	(0)
2023	Mexico U23	3	(0)
2024	Mexico	1	(0)
Medal record
Men's football
Representing Mexico
Central American and Caribbean Games
Gold medal – first place	2023 San Salvador	Team
- * Club domestic league appearances and goals as of 25 September 2023 ‡ National team caps and goals as of 31 May 2024

Ricardo Saúl Monreal Morales (born 10 February 2001) is a Mexican professional footballer who plays as a forward for Liga MX club Tigres UANL.

== Club Career ==
Born in Zacatecas, Monreal began his professional career at just 16, making his debut with Alebrijes de Oaxaca in the Ascenso MX.

He joined Necaxa ahead of the Apertura 2018 and made his Liga MX debut against Tijuana in February 2019. After loan spells with Oaxaca and Pumas Tabasco, he returned to Necaxa in 2022.

In August 2026, Monreal joined Tigres UANL.

== International career ==
Monreal made his debut for the Mexico national team on 31 May 2024, in a friendly against Bolivia.

== Career statistics ==
=== International ===
As of match played on 31 May 2024

Appearances and goals by national team and year
National team	Year	Apps	Goals
Mexico	2024	1	0
Total		1	0

== Honours ==
Mexico U23

- Central American and Caribbean Games: 2023
