= Denzell García =

Mexican footballer (born 2003)

Personal information
- Full name: Denzell Arturo García Bojórquez
- Date of birth: 15 August 2003 (age 23)
- Place of birth: Ahome, Sinaloa, Mexico
- Height: 1.70 m (5 ft 7 in)
- Positions: Defensive midfielder; full-back

Team information
- Current team: Juárez
- Number: 5

Youth career
- 2018: Cruz Azul
- 2020–2022: Juárez

Senior career*
Years	Team	Apps	(Gls)
2022–	Juárez	121	(5)

International career^{‡}
2023–	Mexico U23	6	(0)
2024–	Mexico	5	(0)
Medal record
Men's football
Representing Mexico
Central American and Caribbean Games
Gold medal – first place	2023 San Salvador	Team
- * Club domestic league appearances and goals as of 20 November 2026 ‡ National team caps and goals as of 6 October 2026

Denzell Arturo García Bojórquez (born 15 August 2003) is a Mexican professional footballer who plays as a defensive midfielder and as a full-back for Liga MX club Juárez and the Mexico national team.

== Club career ==
García began his career at the Cruz Azul academy, before being transferred to Juárez, making his professional in a 0–3 loss to América, being subbed in at the 65th minute.

== International career ==
García made his debut for the Mexico national team on 31 May 2024 in a friendly against Bolivia.

== Career statistics ==
=== Club ===
As of match played on 20 November 2026

Club	Season	League			Cup		Continental		Other		Total	
Club	Season	Division	Apps	Goals	Apps	Goals	Apps	Goals	Apps	Goals	Apps	Goals
Juárez	2021–22	Liga MX	1	0	—		—		—		1	0
Juárez	2022–23	Liga MX	18	1	—		—		—		18	1
Juárez	2023–24	Liga MX	27	1	—		—		3 (Note: Appearances in Leagues Cup)	0	30	1
Juárez	2024–25	Liga MX	21	0	—		—		1	0	30	1
Juárez	2025–26	Liga MX	38	3	—		—		3	0	41	3
Juárez	2026–27	Liga MX	16	0	—		—		3	0	19	0
Career total			121	5	0	0	0	0	10	0	131	5

=== International ===
As of match played on 6 October 2026

Appearances and goals by national team and year
National team	Year	Apps	Goals
Mexico	2024	1	0
Mexico	2025	0	0
Mexico	2026	4	0
Total		5	0

== Honours ==
Mexico U23

- Central American and Caribbean Games: 2023
