= Oleksandr Martynyuk =

Ukrainian footballer

Personal information
- Full name: Oleksandr Andriyovych Martynyuk
- Date of birth: 25 November 2001 (age 24)
- Place of birth: Tarakaniv, Rivne Oblast, Ukraine
- Height: 1.75 m (5 ft 9 in)
- Position: Left back

Team information
- Current team: Metalist 1925 Kharkiv
- Number: 24

Youth career
- 2014–2018: VIK-Volyn Volodymyr-Volynskyi

Senior career*
Years	Team	Apps	(Gls)
2017–2018	VIK Volodymyr-Volynskyi	1	(1)
2018–2022	Volyn Lutsk	38	(0)
2020	→ Volyn-2 Lutsk	7	(0)
2022–2025	Oleksandriya	48	(0)
2025–	Metalist 1925 Kharkiv	20	(0)

International career^{‡}
2024	Ukraine U23	10	(1)
2025–	Ukraine	1	(0)
- * Club domestic league appearances and goals as of 3 June 2026 ‡ National team caps and goals as of 11 June 2025

Oleksandr Andriyovych Martynyuk (Ukrainian: Олександр Андрійович Мартинюк; born 25 November 2001) is a Ukrainian professional footballer who plays as a left back for Ukrainian club Metalist 1925 Kharkiv and the Ukraine national team.

== Early life ==
Martynyuk was born in Tarakaniv, near Dubno, Rivne Oblast. He is a product of the BRW-VIK youth sportive school in Volodymyr-Volynskyi, where he trained from 2014 to 2018 before joining the youth ranks of Volyn Lutsk.

== Club career ==
=== Volyn Lutsk ===
Martynyuk made his professional debut for Volyn Lutsk in the Ukrainian First League during the 2019–20 season. He spent three seasons with the club, becoming a reliable defensive option. During the 2020–21 season, he also appeared for the reserve team, Volyn-2, in the Druga Liga to maintain match fitness.

=== Oleksandriya ===
In July 2022, Martynyuk moved to FC Oleksandriya on a free transfer. He made his Ukrainian Premier League debut shortly after. His most successful period at the club came during the 2024–25 season, where he appeared in 29 league matches, earning praise for his crossing ability and defensive positioning.

=== Metalist 1925 Kharkiv ===
On 1 July 2025, Martynyuk signed a three-year contract with Metalist 1925. He established himself as the first-choice left-back during the first half of the 2025–26 campaign.

== International career ==
Martynyuk has represented Ukraine at the U23 level. In 2024, he was named in the squad for the 2024 Summer Olympics in Paris. He also featured in the 2024 Maurice Revello Tournament, scoring one goal during the competition.

He earned his first cap for the senior Ukraine national football team on 10 June 2025, in a friendly victory against New Zealand.
