= Arseniy Batahov =

Ukrainian footballer

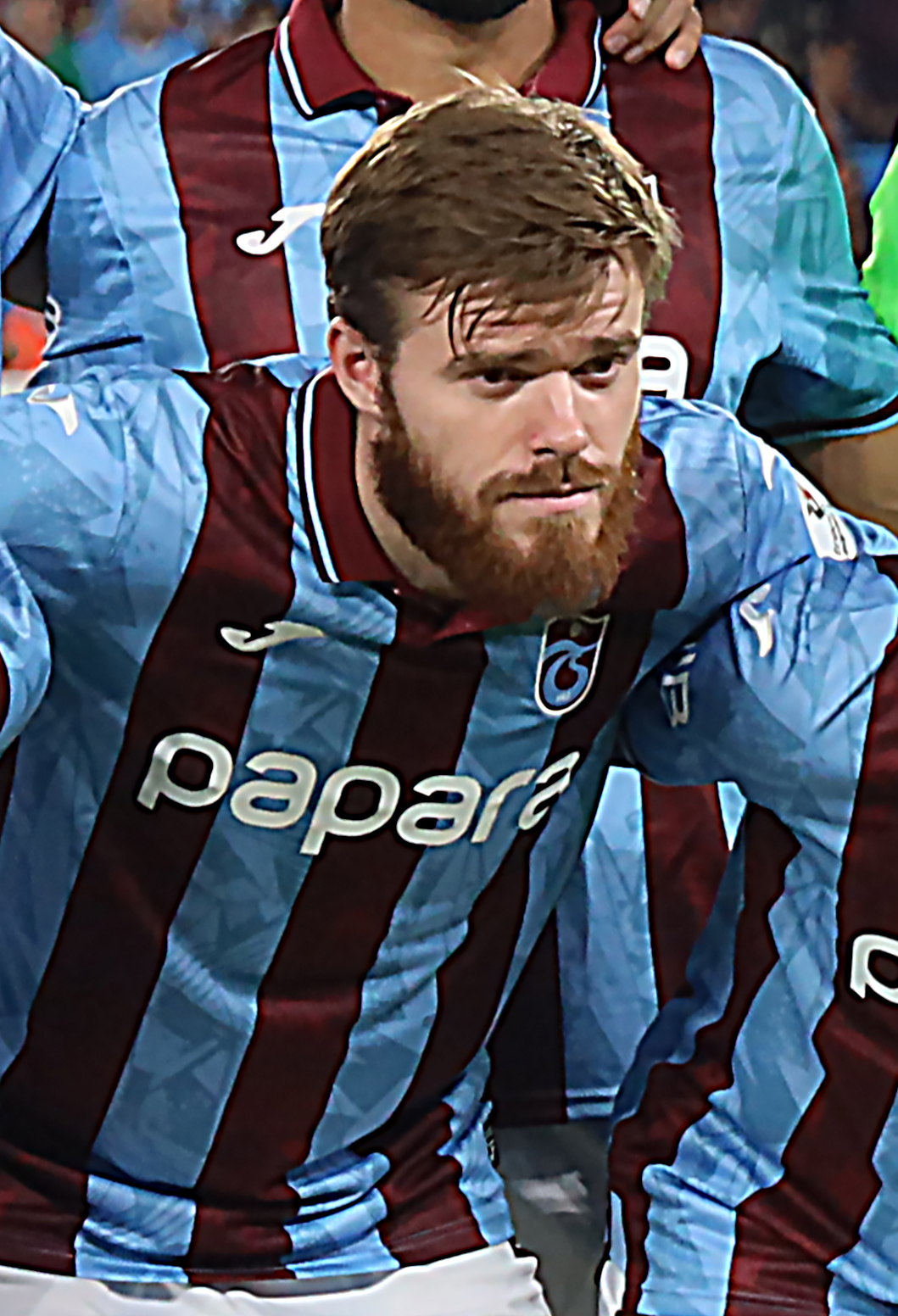
- Batahov in 2025 with Trabzonspor

Personal information
- Full name: Arseniy Pavlovych Batahov
- Date of birth: 5 March 2002 (age 24)
- Place of birth: Berezivka, Kharkiv Oblast, Ukraine
- Height: 1.84 m (6 ft 0 in)
- Position: Centre-back

Team information
- Current team: Trabzonspor
- Number: 44

Youth career
- 201?–2015: Metalist Kharkiv
- 2015–2016: Youth Sportive School Liubotyn
- 2016: Metalist Kharkiv
- 2017–2018: Dnipro

Senior career*
Years	Team	Apps	(Gls)
2018	Dnipro	4	(0)
2018–2022	Dnipro-1	40	(0)
2022	→ Polissya Zhytomyr (loan)	0	(0)
2022–2024	Zorya Luhansk	54	(3)
2024–	Trabzonspor	42	(1)

International career^{‡}
2017	Ukraine U16	2	(0)
2019	Ukraine U17	3	(1)
2019	Ukraine U19	3	(0)
2021–2025	Ukraine U21	39	(3)
2024	Ukraine U23	6	(0)
Medal record
Men's football
Representing Ukraine
UEFA European Under-21 Championship
Bronze medal – third place	2023 Georgia-Romania
- * Club domestic league appearances and goals as of 10 June 2026 ‡ National team caps and goals as of 19 June 2025

Arseniy Pavlovych Batahov (Ukrainian: Арсеній Павлович Батагов; born 5 March 2002) is a Ukrainian professional footballer who plays as a centre-back for Trabzonspor.

== Club career ==
Batahov was born in Kharkiv Raion of the Kharkiv Oblast and is a product of the different youth sportive schools of Kharkiv Oblast and FC Dnipro Youth Sportive School system. In April 2018 he was promoted to the main-team squad of FC Dnipro and made his debut in the Ukrainian Second League.

In July 2018, he joined the new created SC Dnipro-1 and made his debut for this club in the winning match against FC Sumy on 12 April 2019 in the Ukrainian First League as a start-squad player.

On 2 July 2022, he moved to Zorya Luhansk.

In August 2024, Süper Lig club Trabzonspor confirmed that Batahov had signed for the club.

== International career ==
Batahov played for the Ukraine U21 side from 2021 to 2025. He was a part of the Ukraine squad that qualified to the UEFA European Under-21 Championship semi final.

He was selected in the squad to compete in the men's football tournament at the 2024 Summer Olympics. In May 2024, Batahov was called up by Ruslan Rotan to the Ukraine Olympic football team squad to play at the 2024 Maurice Revello Tournament in France.

== Career statistics ==
As of match played 15 May 2026

Appearances and goals by club, season and competition
Club	Season	League			National cup (Note: Includes Ukrainian Cup, Turkish Cup)		Europe		Other		Total	
Club	Season	Division	Apps	Goals	Apps	Goals	Apps	Goals	Apps	Goals	Apps	Goals
Dnipro-1	2019–20	Ukrainian Premier League	14	0	2	0	–		–		16	0
Dnipro-1	2020–21	Ukrainian Premier League	15	0	1	1	–		–		16	1
Dnipro-1	2021–22	Ukrainian Premier League	3	0	2	0	–		–		5	0
Dnipro-1	Total		32	0	5	1	–		–		37	1
Zorya Luhansk	2022–23	Ukrainian Premier League	30	1	0	0	2 (Note: Appearances in UEFA Conference League)	0	–		32	1
Zorya Luhansk	2023–24	Ukrainian Premier League	24	2	1	0	6 (Note: Two appearances in UEFA Europa League, four appearances in UEFA Conference League)	0	–		30	2
Zorya Luhansk	Total		54	3	1	0	8	0	–		63	3
Trabzonspor	2024–25	Süper Lig	18	1	5	1	–		–		23	2
Trabzonspor	2025–26	Süper Lig	24	0	5	1	–		1 (Note: Appearance in Turkish Super Cup)	0	29	1
Trabzonspor	2026–27	Süper Lig	0	0	0	0	0	0	0	0	0	0
Trabzonspor	Total		42	1	10	2	0	0	1	0	52	3
Career total			128	4	16	3	8	0	1	0	153	7

== Honours ==
Dnipro-1

- Ukrainian First League: 2018–19

Trabzonspor

- Turkish Cup: 2025–26

Ukraine U21

- Toulon Tournament: 2024
