= Volodymyr Salyuk =

Ukrainian footballer

Personal information
- Full name: Volodymyr Volodymyrovych Salyuk
- Date of birth: 25 June 2002 (age 24)
- Place of birth: Odesa, Ukraine
- Height: 1.86 m (6 ft 1 in)
- Position: Centre-back

Team information
- Current team: Metalist 1925 Kharkiv
- Number: 13

Youth career
- 2015–2016: Chornomorets Odesa
- 2016: DYuSSh-11 Odesa
- 2016–2018: Chornomorets Odesa
- 2018–2021: Athletic Odesa

Senior career*
Years	Team	Apps	(Gls)
2021–2022	Balkany Zorya	30	(2)
2022–2024	Chornomorets Odesa	53	(2)
2024–	Metalist 1925 Kharkiv	35	(1)

International career^{‡}
2023–2025	Ukraine U21	17	(0)
2024	Ukraine U23	7	(0)
Medal record
Men's football
Representing Ukraine
UEFA European Under-21 Championship
Bronze medal – third place	2023 Georgia-Romania
- * Club domestic league appearances and goals as of 3 June 2026 ‡ National team caps and goals as of 19 June 2025

Volodymyr Volodymyrovych Salyuk (Ukrainian: Володимир Володимирович Салюк [woloˈdɪmɪr sɐˈlʲuk]; born 25 June 2002) is a Ukrainian professional footballer who plays as a centre-back for Metalist 1925 Kharkiv.

== Career ==
On 21 July 2022, Salyuk joined Ukrainian Premier League side Chornomorets Odesa. On 5 August 2024, he joined Ukrainian side Metalist 1925 Kharkiv.

== International career ==
In June 2024, he took part in the Maurice Revello Tournament in France with Ukraine. He wins the tournament by beating Ivory Coast in final.
