= Jesús Alcántar =

Mexican footballer (born 2003)

Personal information
- Full name: Jesús Alberto Alcántar Rodríguez
- Date of birth: 30 July 2003 (age 23)
- Place of birth: Caborca, Sonora, Mexico
- Height: 1.91 m (6 ft 3 in)
- Position: Centre-back

Team information
- Current team: FBC Melgar (on loan from Necaxa)
- Number: 90

Youth career
- 2020: Cimarrones TDP
- 2020–2023: Necaxa

Senior career*
Years	Team	Apps	(Gls)
2023–	Necaxa	22	(0)
2022–2023	→ Sporting B (loan)	22	(2)
2026–	→ FBC Melgar (loan)	15	(2)

International career^{‡}
2020	Mexico U18	1	(0)
2021	Mexico U19	1	(0)
2021–2022	Mexico U20	13	(0)
2024–	Mexico	1	(0)
- * Club domestic league appearances and goals as of 01:58, 29 December 2025 (UTC) ‡ National team caps and goals as of 31 May 2024

Jesús Alberto Alcántar Rodríguez (born 30 July 2003) is a Mexican professional footballer who plays as a centre-back for Peruvian Primera División club Melgar, on loan from Liga MX club Necaxa.

== Club career ==
Born in Caborca, Sonora, Alcántar started his career with Cimarrones de Sonora before a move to Necaxa in 2020. After making his first team debut in February 2022, he was loaned to Portuguese club Sporting CP to play for their 'B' team.

On 27 December 2025, Alcántar was sent on loan to Peruvian Primera División club FBC Melgar.

== International career ==
Alcántar was called up to the under-20 team by Luis Ernesto Pérez to participate at the 2021 Revelations Cup, appearing in three matches, where Mexico won the competition. In June 2022, he was named into the final 20-man roster for the CONCACAF Under-20 Championship, in which Mexico failed to qualify for the FIFA U-20 World Cup and Olympics.

Alcántar made his senior Mexico debut on 31 May 2024, in a friendly against Bolivia, the match took place at the Chicago Soldier Field and with Mexico taking the 1–0 win.

== Career statistics ==
=== Club ===
As of 1 April 2025

Appearances and goals by club, season and competition
Club	Season	League			National cup		Continental (Note: Includes appearances in Leagues Cup)		Other		Total	
Club	Season	Division	Apps	Goals	Apps	Goals	Apps	Goals	Apps	Goals	Apps	Goals
Necaxa	2021–22	Liga MX	1	0	—		—		—		1	0
Necaxa	2023–24	Liga MX	5	0	—		—		—		5	0
Necaxa	2024–25	Liga MX	8	0	—		2	0	—		10	0
Necaxa	Total		14	0	0	0	2	0	0	0	16	0
Sporting B (loan)	2022–23	Liga 3	22	2	—		—		—		22	2
Career total			42	2	0	0	2	0	0	0	28	2

=== International ===
As of match played 31 May 2024

Appearances and goals by national team and year
National team	Year	Apps	Goals
Mexico	2024	1	0
Total		1	0

== Honours ==
Mexico U20

- Revelations Cup: 2021, 2022
