= Alan Bautista =

Mexican footballer (born 2002)

Personal information
- Full name: Alan Ernesto Bautista Gutiérrez
- Date of birth: 11 June 2002 (age 24)
- Place of birth: Mexico City, Mexico
- Height: 1.69 m (5 ft 7 in)
- Position: Midfielder

Team information
- Current team: Pachuca
- Number: 26

Youth career
- –2021: UFD
- 2021–2023: Pachuca

Senior career*
Years	Team	Apps	(Gls)
2024–	Pachuca	95	(12)

International career^{‡}
2024–	Mexico U23	5	(1)
- * Club domestic league appearances and goals as of 21 November 2026 ‡ National team caps and goals as of 16 March 2025

Alan Ernesto Bautista Gutiérrez (born 11 June 2002) is a Mexican professional footballer who plays as a midfielder for Liga MX club Pachuca.

== Early life ==
Bautista was born on 11 June 2002 in Mexico City, Mexico. Growing up, he attended the Universidad del Fútbol y Ciencias del Deporte in Mexico, where he played for their football team and studied marketing.

== Club career ==
As a youth player, Bautista joined the Universidad Del Futbol. In 2021, he joined the youth academy of Pachuca and was promoted to the club's senior team in 2024. American news website ESPN Deportes wrote in 2024 that he was "considered within Pachuca as the first success story to emerge from the Universidad del Fútbol". On 14 January 2024, he debuted for them during a 1–0 away win over Cruz Azul in the league. On 1 February 2024, he scored his first goal for them during a 4–3 win over Atlas in the league.

== Career statistics ==
=== Club ===
As of match played on 21 November 2026

Club	Season	League			Cup		Continental		Global		Other		Total	
Club	Season	Division	Apps	Goals	Apps	Goals	Apps	Goals	Apps	Goals	Apps	Goals	Apps	Goals
Pachuca	2023–24	Liga MX	19	5	—		6 (Note: Appearances in CONCACAF Champions Cup)	2	—		—		25	7
Pachuca	2024–25	Liga MX	25	1	—		—		3 (Note: Appearances in FIFA Intercontinental Cup)	0	3 (Note: Appearances in Leagues Cup)	0	31	1
Pachuca	2025–26	Liga MX	35	3	—		—		3 (Note: Appearances in FIFA Club World Cup)	0	4	0	42	3
Pachuca	2026–27	Liga MX	16	3	—		—		—		3	1	19	4
Career total			95	12	0	0	6	2	6	0	10	1	117	15

== Honours ==
Individual

- Liga MX All-Star: 2024, 2025
