= Maksym Khlan =

Ukrainian footballer

Personal information
- Full name: Maksym Serhiyovych Khlan
- Date of birth: 27 January 2003 (age 23)
- Place of birth: Zhytomyr, Ukraine
- Height: 1.70 m (5 ft 7 in)
- Position: Left winger

Team information
- Current team: Górnik Zabrze
- Number: 33

Youth career
- –2015: Dynamo Kyiv
- 2015–2020: Karpaty Lviv

Senior career*
Years	Team	Apps	(Gls)
2020–2021	Karpaty Lviv	1	(0)
2021–2023	Zorya Luhansk	8	(0)
2023–2025	Lechia Gdańsk	54	(14)
2025–	Górnik Zabrze	35	(7)
2025	Górnik Zabrze II	1	(0)

International career^{‡}
2018	Ukraine U16	4	(0)
2019–2020	Ukraine U17	12	(1)
2022–2025	Ukraine U21	13	(1)
2024	Ukraine U23	10	(3)
2026–	Ukraine	2	(0)
- * Club domestic league appearances and goals as of 18:56, 28 September 2026 (UTC) ‡ National team caps and goals as of 09:12, 6 October 2026 (UTC)

Maksym Serhiyovych Khlan (Ukrainian: Максим Сергійович Хлань; born 27 January 2003) is a Ukrainian professional footballer who plays as a left winger for Ekstraklasa club Górnik Zabrze and the Ukraine national team.

== Club career ==
=== Youth career ===
Born in Zhytomyr, Maksym Khlan began his football journey in Ukraine, first training at the Dynamo Kyiv youth academy. In 2015, he moved to the Karpaty Lviv youth system, spending the majority of his formative years there. His performances at youth level earned him progression to Karpaty Lviv’s senior setup.

=== Karpaty Lviv ===
On 27 June 2020, Khlan made his Ukrainian Premier League debut for Karpaty Lviv, coming on as a second-half substitute in the home derby against FC Lviv.

=== Zorya Luhansk ===
In January 2021, Khlan signed a contract with another Ukrainian Premier League side, Zorya Luhansk.

=== Lechia Gdańsk ===
On 4 September 2023, after remaining a free agent throughout the summer, Khlan joined Polish I liga club Lechia Gdańsk, where he was assigned with squad number 30. Khlan made his debut in I liga on 22 September 2023, in a 3–1 victory over GKS Katowice. On 28 September 2023, he saw a red card during the final minutes of a 2–1 Polish Cup loss against Wisła Kraków. One month later, on 28 October, he scored his first goal for Lechia in the 35th minute of a 2–1 victory over Stal Rzeszów. Throughout the 2023–24 season, he appeared in 25 matches, scored nine goals and was shown two red cards.

He scored his first goal in Ekstraklasa on 21 September 2024, in a 3–2 away loss against Jagiellonia Białystok. He left the club at the end of June 2025 when his contract expired.

=== Górnik Zabrze ===
On 13 August 2025, Khlan joined fellow Ekstraklasa club Górnik Zabrze on a two-year contract. On 2 May 2026, he scored Górnik's second goal in a 2–0 victory over Raków Częstochowa in the 2025–26 Polish Cup final, giving Górnik their first piece of silverware since 1988.

== International career ==
In May 2024, Khlan was called up by Ruslan Rotan to the Ukraine Olympic football team squad to play at the 2024 Maurice Revello Tournament in France. In July 2024, he was included in Ukraine's squad for the 2024 Summer Olympics.

On 28 September 2026, Khlan debuted for the Ukraine senior team in a UEFA Nations League match against Georgia, ending in a goalless draw.

== Career statistics ==
=== International ===
As of match played 5 October 2026

Appearances and goals by national team and year
National team	Year	Apps	Goals
Ukraine
Ukraine	2026	2	0
Total		2	0

== Honours ==
Lechia Gdańsk

- I liga: 2023–24

Górnik Zabrze

- Polish Cup: 2025–26

Ukraine U23

- Toulon Tournament: 2024

Individual

- Ekstraklasa Player of the Month: May 2026
- I liga Player of the Month: February & March 2024
- Polish Union of Footballers' I liga Team of the Season: 2023–24
- Toulon Tournament Best Player: 2024
