= Muhannad Al-Saad (footballer, born 2003) =

Saudi Arabian footballer (born 2003)

Personal information
- Full name: Muhannad Yahya Saeed Al-Saad
- Date of birth: 29 June 2003 (age 23)
- Place of birth: Al Hada, Saudi Arabia
- Height: 1.72 m (5 ft 8 in)
- Position: Winger

Team information
- Current team: Neom
- Number: 14

Youth career
- –2017: Al-Ahli
- 2017–2023: Al-Ettifaq

Senior career*
Years	Team	Apps	(Gls)
2023–2024	Al-Ettifaq	3	(0)
2024–	Neom	28	(7)
2025	→ Dunkerque (loan)	12	(3)
2025–2026	→ Lausanne-Sport (loan)	3	(1)

International career^{‡}
2024	Saudi Arabia U20	4	(2)
2025–	Saudi Arabia	2	(1)
- * Club domestic league appearances and goals as of 3 September 2026 ‡ National team caps and goals as of 23 June 2025

Muhannad Yahya Saeed Al-Saad (Arabic: مهند آل سعد; born 29 June 2003) is a Saudi Arabian professional footballer who plays as a winger for Neom, and the Saudi Arabia national team.

== Club career ==
As a youth player, Al-Saad joined the youth academy of Saudi Arabian side Al-Ahli.

=== Al-Ettifaq ===
In 2017, after being released by Al-Ahli, Al-Saad joined Al-Ettifaq. He signed his first professional contract on 8 July 2023. In his debut season, he made three league appearances and scored zero goals and played under England international Steven Gerrard.

=== Neom ===
During the summer of 2024, he signed for Saudi Arabian side Neom, helping the club achieve promotion from the second tier to the top flight.

==== loan to Dunkerque ====
On 30 January 2025, he was sent on loan to French second-tier side Dunkerque until the end of the season.

On 4 February 2025, he played his first game for Dunkerque in the round of 16 of the 2024–25 Coupe de France, to become the first Saudi to play in the Coupe de France and in a professional game in France.

On 10 February 2025, as Dunkerque won 2-0 against Caen, he played his first Ligue 2 game to become the first Saudi to play in French second-tier division.

On 21 February 2025, he scored his first goal for Dunkerque in a 3-0 win against Clermont Foot in Ligue 2, to become the first Saudi to score in Ligue 2 and in a professional game in France..

Arabic news website Goal wrote in 2025 that he "immediately become a key player for the team" while playing for the club.

On 1 April 2025, he scored a goal in a 2-4 defeat against Paris Saint-Germain in Coupe de France semi-finals, to become the first Saudi to score in Coupe de France.

==== loan to Lausanne Sport ====
In July 2025, Al-Saad joined Swiss Super League club Lausanne-Sport on a season-long loan deal.

== International career ==
In March 2025, Al-Saad received his first call-up to the Saudi Arabia national team for the 2026 FIFA World Cup qualification games against China and Japan. On 30 May 2025, he has made his international debut with Saudi Arabia against Jordan in an international friendly, in which he had also scored his first goal for the Green Falcons, ending the game as a 2–0 win for Saudi Arabia.

== Style of play ==
Al-Saad plays as a winger. Right-footed, he can play as a right-winger or as a left-winger.

== Career statistics ==
=== International ===
As of match played 30 May 2025

National team	Year	Apps	Goals
Saudi Arabia
Saudi Arabia	2025	2	1
Total		2	1

Scores and results list Saudi Arabia goal tally first, score column indicates score after each Al-Saad goal

List of international goals scored by Muhammad Al-Saad
No.	Date	Venue	Opponent	Score	Result	Competition
1	30 May 2025	Al-Ettifaq Club Stadium, Dammam, Saudi Arabia	Jordan	1–0	2–0	Friendly
