= Vladyslav Veleten =

Ukrainian footballer (born 2002)

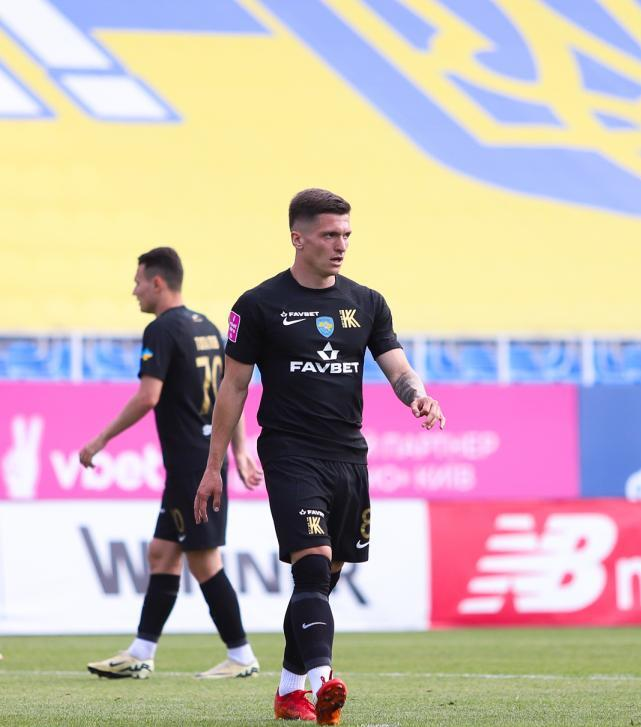
- Veleten in 2024

Personal information
- Full name: Vladyslav Serhiyovych Veleten
- Date of birth: 1 October 2002 (age 24)
- Place of birth: Kyiv, Ukraine
- Height: 1.76 m (5 ft 9 in)
- Position: Midfielder

Team information
- Current team: Polissya Zhytomyr
- Number: 10

Youth career
- 2015–2021: Dynamo Kyiv

Senior career*
Years	Team	Apps	(Gls)
2021–2025	Kolos Kovalivka	67	(6)
2025–	Polissya Zhytomyr	13	(3)

International career^{‡}
2024–2025	Ukraine U21	6	(1)
2024	Ukraine U23	7	(2)
2025–	Ukraine	2	(0)
- * Club domestic league appearances and goals as of 3 June 2026 ‡ National team caps and goals as of 6 October 2026

Vladyslav Serhiyovych Veleten (Ukrainian: Владислав Сергійович Велетень; born 1 October 2002) is a Ukrainian professional footballer who plays as midfielder for Polissya Zhytomyr and the Ukraine national team.

During the 2022 Russian invasion of Ukraine, Veleten joined the Territorial Defence Forces. He was trained in Kyiv and was later assigned to Kramatorsk. He served eight months in total, and about two of them were at the front.

== Career ==
=== Early years ===
Veleten is a product of the Dynamo Kyiv youth academy in his native Kyiv and competed for this team in the Ukrainian Youth Football League.

=== Kolos Kovalivka ===
In October 2021 he joined the senior squad of Ukrainian Premier League side Kolos Kovalivka and made his league debut against Dnipro-1 on 16 October 2021 as a second-half substitute.

=== Polissya Zhytomyr ===
In August 2025 Veleten joined Ukrainian Premier League side Polissya Zhytomyr and made his debut against Dynamo Kyiv on 31 August 2025.

== International career ==
In May 2024, Veleten was called up by Ruslan Rotan to the Ukraine Olympic football team squad to play at the 2024 Maurice Revello Tournament in France.

== Personal life ==
During the 2022 Russian invasion of Ukraine, Veleten joined the Territorial Defence Forces. He was trained in Kyiv and was later assigned to Kramatorsk. He served eight months in total, and about two of them were at the front.

== Honours ==
Individual

- SportArena Player of the Round: 2025–26 (Round 10),
- Ukrainian Premier League Player of the Round: 2025–26 (Round 10),
