= Kyrylo Siheyev =

Ukrainian footballer

Personal information
- Full name: Kyrylo Romanovych Siheyev
- Date of birth: 16 May 2004 (age 22)
- Place of birth: Horlivka, Ukraine
- Height: 1.82 m (6 ft 0 in)
- Position: Central midfielder

Team information
- Current team: Kudrivka (on loan from Shakhtar Donetsk)
- Number: 66

Youth career
- 2017–2021: Shakhtar Donetsk

Senior career*
Years	Team	Apps	(Gls)
2021–	Shakhtar Donetsk	0	(0)
2023–2024	→ Oleksandriya (loan)	37	(2)
2024–2025	→ Chornomorets Odesa (loan)	14	(0)
2025–2026	→ Tatran Prešov (loan)	3	(0)
2026–	→ Kudrivka (loan)	4	(0)

International career^{‡}
2023	Ukraine U19	3	(0)
2022–	Ukraine U21	4	(0)
2024	Ukraine U23	8	(0)
- * Club domestic league appearances and goals as of 17 October 2026 ‡ National team caps and goals as of 30 July 2024

Kyrylo Romanovych Siheyev (Ukrainian: Кирило Романович Сігеєв; born 16 May 2004) is a Ukrainian professional footballer who plays as a central midfielder for Kudrivka, on loan from Shakhtar Donetsk.

== Club career ==
=== Shakhtar Donetsk ===
Born in Horlivka, Donetsk Oblast, Siheyev is a product of the nearby Shakhtar Donetsk academy. He played several seasons in the Ukrainian Premier League Reserves.

==== Loan to FC Oleksandriya ====
In March 2023 went on loan to Oleksandriya in the Ukrainian Premier League. He made his league debut for Oleksandriya as a substitute against Dnipro-1 on 4 March.

==== Loan to FC Chornomorets Odesa ====
In August 2024 he went on loan to Ukrainian Premier League side FC Chornomorets Odesa.

==== Loan to FC Kudrivka ====
On 2 August 2026, he was loaned to Kudrivka.

== International career ==
On 6 March 2024, Siheyev was called up by Ruslan Rotan to the Ukraine Olympic football team preliminary squad as a preparation to the 2024 Summer Olympics.

In June 2024, he took part in the Maurice Revello Tournament in France with Ukraine. He wins the competition by beating Ivory Coast in final.
