= Oleh Fedor =

Ukrainian footballer

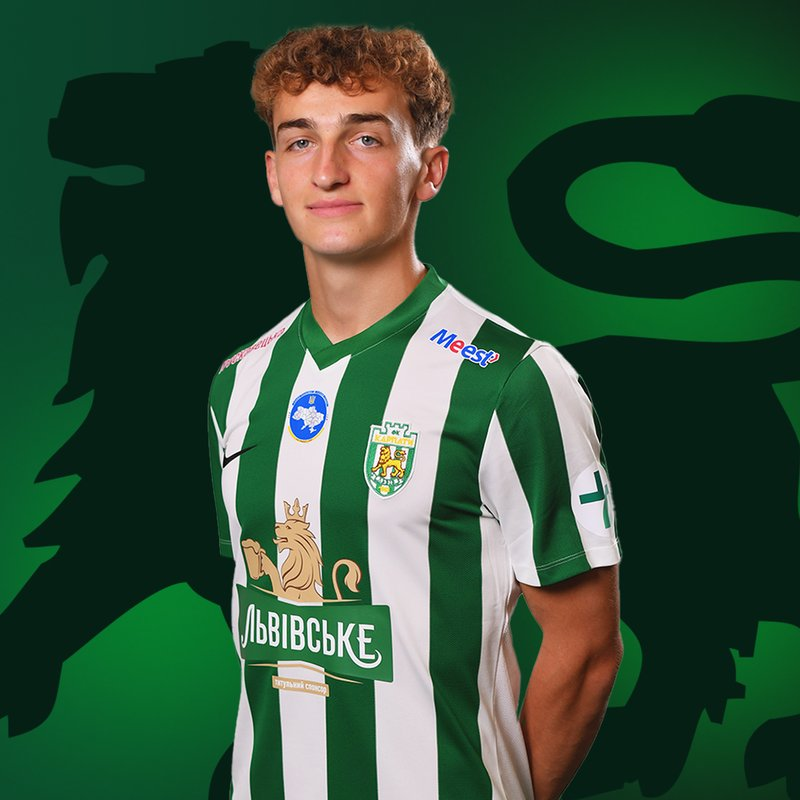

Personal information
- Full name: Oleh Andriyovych Fedor
- Date of birth: 23 July 2004 (age 22)
- Place of birth: Lviv, Ukraine
- Height: 1.76 m (5 ft 9 in)
- Position: Midfielder

Team information
- Current team: Polissya Zhytomyr
- Number: 27

Youth career
- 2012–2020: Karpaty Lviv
- 2020–2022: Rukh Lviv

Senior career*
Years	Team	Apps	(Gls)
2022–2025	Rukh Lviv	32	(0)
2025	→ Karpaty Lviv (loan)	17	(0')
2026–	Polissya Zhytomyr	11	(0)

International career^{‡}
2020	Ukraine U16	2	(0)
2022	Ukraine U19	3	(1)
2024–	Ukraine U21	7	(0)
2024	Ukraine U23	10	(2)
- * Club domestic league appearances and goals as of 3 June 2026 ‡ National team caps and goals as of 5 September 2025

Oleh Fedor (Ukrainian: Олег Андрійович Федор; born 23 July 2004) is a Ukrainian professional footballer who plays as a midfielder for Polissya Zhytomyr.

== Club career ==
Born in Lviv, Fedor began his career in the local Karpaty Lviv, where his first coach was Vitaliy Ponomaryov. Then he continued in the Rukh Lviv academy.

In September 2020 he signed a contract with the Ukrainian Premier League side Rukh Lviv. He made his debut in the Ukrainian Premier League on 17 September 2023 in an away match against LNZ Cherkasy.

== International career ==
On 6 March 2024, Fedor was called up by Ruslan Rotan to the Ukraine Olympic football team preliminary squad as a preparation to the 2024 Summer Olympics.
