= Ukraine Olympic football team =

National sports team

Ukraine Olympic
- Association: Ukrainian Association of Football (UAF)
- Confederation: UEFA (Europe)
- Head coach: Ruslan Rotan
- Captain: Danylo Sikan
- Most caps: 3 players (10)
- Top scorer: Maksym Khlan (3)
- FIFA code: UKR
| First colours | Second colours |

First international
- Japan 2–0 Ukraine (Kitakyushu, Japan; 25 March 2024)

Biggest win
- Ukraine 4–0 Italy (Aubagne, France; 6 June 2024)

Biggest defeat
- Japan 2–0 Ukraine (Kitakyushu, Japan; 25 March 2024); Ukraine 0–2 Argentina (Décines-Charpieu, France; 30 July 2024)

Summer Olympic
- Appearances: 1 (first in 2024)
- Best result: Group stage (2024)

The Ukraine Olympic football team (Ukrainian: Олімпійська збірна України з футболу, also known as Ukraine Under-23) represents Ukraine in international football competitions in Olympic Games. The team is one of the Ukrainian junior football teams and only is called when Ukraine qualifies for Summer Olympics.

Ukraine made its football debut at the 2024 Summer Olympics in Paris, headed by Ruslan Rotan.

== History ==
On 2 July 2023 the Ukraine national under-21 football team beat their peers from France at the European Championship quarterfinals and for their first time in its history qualified to the Summer Olympics football tournament. Along with the Ukrainian team to the competition also qualified Israel and Spain.

Ruslan Rotan, the coach of Ukraine under-21 team, became the head coach of the team for the Olympic Games.

The first match of the Olympic team of Ukraine was a control and took place on 25 March 2024 at the Mikuni World Stadium Kitakyushu in Fukuoka Prefecture against the Japan national under-23 football team (0:2).

The same year in June the Ukraine Olympic participated at the Maurice Revello Tournament and won their first title by defeating Ivory Coast U20 5–4 in a penalty shoot-out in the final, after the match had finished in a 2–2 draw.

== Results and fixtures ==
The following is a list of all match results, as well as any future matches that have been scheduled.

Win Draw Loss Fixture

== Coaching staff ==
Currently approved for the 2024 Summer Olympics:

| Position | Name |
|---|---|
| Head coach | (Ukraine) Ruslan Rotan |
| Assistant coach | (Ukraine) Serhiy Kravchenko |

== Head coaches ==
As of 30 July 2024

| Manager | Nation | Ukraine career | Played | Won | Drawn | Lost | GF | GA | Win % | Olympic tournament |
|---|---|---|---|---|---|---|---|---|---|---|
| Ruslan Rotan | (Ukraine) | 2024 | 11 | 5 | 3 | 3 | 19 | 13 | 45.45 | 2024 |

== Players ==
=== Current squad ===
All the players must be born on or after 1 January 2001, with a maximum of three overage players permitted. Names in bold denote players who have been capped for the senior team.

The following players were called up for the friendly and 2024 Summer Olympics matches against Egypt, Paraguay, Iraq, Morocco and Argentina on 14, 18, 24, 27 and 30 July 2024, respectively.

- Caps and goals correct as of 30 July 2024, after the match vs Argentina.

| No. | Pos. | Player | Date of birth (age) | Caps | Goals | Club |
|---|---|---|---|---|---|---|
| 12 | GK | Kiril Fesyun | 7 August 2002 (age 24) | 8 | 0 | (Ukrainian Association of Football) Shakhtar Donetsk |
| 1 | GK | Heorhiy Yermakov | 28 March 2002 (age 24) | 4 | 0 | (Ukrainian Association of Football) Oleksandriya |
| 22 | GK | Yakiv Kinareykin | 22 October 2003 (age 23) | 0 | 0 | (Ukrainian Association of Football) Karpaty Lviv |
| 3 | DF | Oleksandr Martynyuk | 25 November 2001 (age 24) | 10 | 1 | (Ukrainian Association of Football) Oleksandriya |
| 2 | DF | Illya Krupskyi | 2 October 2004 (age 22) | 9 | 0 | (Ukrainian Association of Football) Vorskla Poltava |
| 13 | DF | Volodymyr Salyuk | 25 June 2002 (age 24) | 7 | 0 | (Ukrainian Association of Football) Chornomorets Odesa |
| 16 | DF | Arseniy Batahov | 5 March 2002 (age 24) | 6 | 0 | (Ukrainian Association of Football) Zorya Luhansk |
| 19 | DF | Yevhen Pavlyuk | 18 August 2002 (age 24) | 6 | 0 | (Ukrainian Association of Football) Vorskla Poltava |
| 4 | DF | **Maksym Talovyerov** | 28 June 2000 (age 26) | 5 | 0 | (Austrian Football Association) LASK |
| 6 | DF | Oleksiy Sych | 1 April 2001 (age 25) | 5 | 0 | (Ukrainian Association of Football) Rukh Lviv |
| 11 | MF | Maksym Khlan | 27 January 2003 (age 23) | 10 | 3 | (Polish Football Association) Lechia Gdańsk |
| 17 | MF | Oleh Fedor | 23 July 2004 (age 22) | 10 | 2 | (Ukrainian Association of Football) Rukh Lviv |
| 5 | MF | Valentyn Rubchynskyi | 15 February 2002 (age 24) | 8 | 1 | (Ukrainian Association of Football) Dynamo Kyiv |
| 20 | MF | Kyrylo Siheyev | 16 May 2004 (age 22) | 8 | 0 | (Ukrainian Association of Football) Shakhtar Donetsk |
| 15 | MF | Vladyslav Veleten | 1 October 2002 (age 24) | 7 | 2 | (Ukrainian Association of Football) Kolos Kovalivka |
| 8 | MF | Mykola Mykhaylenko | 22 May 2001 (age 25) | 7 | 1 | (Ukrainian Association of Football) Dynamo Kyiv |
| 10 | MF | Maksym Braharu | 21 July 2002 (age 24) | 7 | 1 | (Ukrainian Association of Football) Dynamo Kyiv |
| 7 | MF | Oleh Ocheretko | 25 May 2003 (age 23) | 6 | 0 | (Ukrainian Association of Football) Shakhtar Donetsk |
| 18 | MF | Dmytro Kryskiv | 6 October 2000 (age 26) | 5 | 1 | (Ukrainian Association of Football) Shakhtar Donetsk |
| 21 | MF | Artem Shulyanskyi | 11 April 2001 (age 25) | 2 | 0 | (Ukrainian Association of Football) Oleksandriya |
| 14 | FW | **Danylo Sikan** (captain) | 16 April 2001 (age 25) | 9 | 1 | (Ukrainian Association of Football) Shakhtar Donetsk |
| 9 | FW | Ihor Krasnopir | 1 December 2002 (age 23) | 8 | 1 | (Ukrainian Association of Football) Rukh Lviv |

=== Recent call-ups ===
The following players have been called up for the team within the last 12 months.

| Pos. | Player | Date of birth (age) | Caps | Goals | Club | Latest call-up |
|---|---|---|---|---|---|---|
Notes: ^{U21} = Was called up to national U21 squad instead.; ^{WD} = Player withdrew from the squad due to non-injury issue.; ^{INJ} = It is not part of the current squad due to injury.; ^{RES} = Reserves squad – replaces a member of the squad in case of injury/unavailability.; ^{PRE} = Preliminary squad/standby.

=== Overage players in Olympic Games ===
Since 1992, the Olympic roster may consist of under-23 players, plus three over-age players.

| Tournament | Player 1 | Player 2 | Player 3 |
|---|---|---|---|
| 2024 | Maksym Talovyerov (DF) | Dmytro Kryskiv (MF) | did not select |

== Honours ==
- Maurice Revello Tournament: 2024

== Head-to-head record ==
As of 30 July 2024, after the match against Argentina.

The following table shows Ukraine Olympic team's all-time international record.

| Against | Played | Won | Drawn | Lost | GF | GA | GD | Confederation |
|---|---|---|---|---|---|---|---|---|
| Argentina | 1 | 0 | 0 | 1 | 0 | 2 | -2 | CONMEBOL |
| Egypt | 1 | 0 | 1 | 0 | 1 | 1 | 0 | CAF |
| Indonesia | 1 | 1 | 0 | 0 | 3 | 0 | +3 | AFC |
| Iraq | 1 | 0 | 0 | 1 | 1 | 2 | -1 | AFC |
| Italy | 1 | 1 | 0 | 0 | 4 | 0 | +4 | UEFA |
| Ivory Coast | 1 | 0 | 1 | 0 | 2 | 2 | 0 | CAF |
| Japan | 2 | 1 | 0 | 1 | 2 | 3 | -1 | AFC |
| Morocco | 1 | 1 | 0 | 0 | 2 | 1 | +1 | CAF |
| Panama | 1 | 1 | 0 | 0 | 2 | 0 | +2 | CONCACAF |
| Paraguay | 1 | 0 | 1 | 0 | 2 | 2 | 0 | CONMEBOL |
| Against:10 Nations | Played:11 | Won:5 | Drawn:3 | Lost:3 | GF:19 | GA:13 | GD:+6 | Confederations:5 |

== Olympic record ==
| Olympic Games record | | | | | | | | | UEFA European Under-21 Championship record | | | | | | | |
| Year | Round | Position | Pld | W | D | L | GF | GA | Pld | W | D | L | GF | GA | → | Outcome |
|---|---|---|---|---|---|---|---|---|---|---|---|---|---|---|---|---|
| 1896–1916 | Part of Russian Empire (predominantly) | | | | | | | | Part of Russian Empire (predominantly) | | | | | | | |
| (Greece) 1896 | No football tournament held | | | | | | | | No football tournament held | | | | | | | |
| (German Empire) 1916 | No competitions due to World War I | | | | | | | | No competitions due to World War I | | | | | | | |
| (Belgium) 1920 | Did not enter due to war | | | | | | | | Did not enter due to war | | | | | | | |
| 1924–1992 | Part of Soviet Union (predominantly) | | | | | | | | Part of Soviet Union (predominantly) | | | | | | | |
| (United States) 1932 | No football tournament held | | | | | | | | No football tournament held | | | | | | | |
| 1940–1944 | No competitions due to World War II | | | | | | | | No competitions due to World War II | | | | | | | |
| (United States) 1996 | Did not qualify | | | | | | | | Eliminated in qualification | | | | | | | |
| (Australia) 2000 | Did not qualify | | | | | | | | Eliminated in qualification | | | | | | | |
| (Greece) 2004 | Did not qualify | | | | | | | | Eliminated in qualification | | | | | | | |
| (China) 2008 | Did not qualify | | | | | | | | Eliminated in qualification | | | | | | | |
| (United Kingdom) 2012 | Did not qualify | | | | | | | | 3 | 0 | 1 | 2 | 1 | 5 | 2011 | 4th in Group B |
| (Brazil) 2016 | Did not qualify | | | | | | | | Eliminated in qualification | | | | | | | |
| (Japan) 2020 | Did not qualify | | | | | | | | Eliminated in qualification | | | | | | | |
| (France) 2024 | Group stage | 9th | 3 | 1 | 0 | 2 | 3 | 5 | 5 | 3 | 1 | 1 | 9 | 8 | 2023 | Semi-finals |
| (United States) 2028 | Did not qualify | | | | | | | | Eliminated in qualification | | | | | | | |
| Total:1/8 | Group stage | 9th | 3 | 1 | 0 | 2 | 3 | 5 | 8 | 3 | 2 | 3 | 10 | 13 | | |

== Ukrainian players on the Soviet Union roster ==
- 1964: Andriy Biba, Viktor Serebryanikov, Valeriy Lobanovskyi
- 1972: Oleksandr Tkachenko, Vadym Sosnykhin, Stefan Reshko, Viktor Matviyenko, Rostyslav Potochnyak, Viktor Zvyahintsev, Serhiy Bondarenko, Volodymyr Troshkin, Volodymyr Veremeyev, Leonid Buryak, Eduard Kozynkevych, Bohdan Hreshchak, Oleh Blokhin
- 1976: Volodymyr Troshkin, Viktor Zvyahintsev, Leonid Buryak
- 1980: Volodymyr Bezsonov, Sergei Baltacha
- 1984: Oleksandr Sorokalet, Viktor Kaplun, Viktor Kuznetsov, Hennadiy Lytovchenko, Viktor Hrachov, Ihor Belanov
- 1988: Oleksiy Cherednyk, Vadym Tyshchenko, Volodymyr Lyutyi, Yevgeny Yarovenko, Oleksiy Mykhaylychenko
