= List of flag bearers for Guinea at the Olympics =

Guinea at the Olympics
- IOC code: GUI
- NOC: Comité National Olympique et Sportif Guinéen
- Medals: Gold 0 Silver 0 Bronze 0 Total 0

Summer appearances
- 1968; 1972–1976; 1980; 1984; 1988; 1992; 1996; 2000; 2004; 2008; 2012; 2016; 2020; 2024

This is a list of flag bearers who have represented Guinea at the Olympics.

Flag bearers carry the national flag of their country at the opening ceremony of the Olympic Games.

#	Event year	Season	Flag bearer	Sport
1	1968	Summer	Morciré Sylla	Football
2	1980	Summer		
3	1984	Summer		
4	1988	Summer	Ousmane Diallo	Wrestling
5	1992	Summer	Soryba Diakité	Athletics
6	1996	Summer	Joseph Loua	Athletics
7	2000	Summer	Joseph Loua	Athletics
8	2004	Summer	Nabie Foday Fofanah	Athletics
9	2008	Summer	Fatmata Fofanah	Athletics
10	2012	Summer	Facinet Keita	Judo
11	2016	Summer	Mamadama Bangoura	Judo
12	2020	Summer	Volunteer	–
13	2024	Summer	Naby Keïta	Football
13	2024	Summer	Fatoumata Sylla	Archery

== See also ==
- Guinea at the Olympics
