= Guinea at the 1996 Summer Olympics =

- IOC code: GUI
- NOC: Comité National Olympique et Sportif Guinéen

in Atlanta
- Competitors: 5 in 2 sports
- Flag bearer: Joseph Loua
- Medals: Gold 0 Silver 0 Bronze 0 Total 0

Summer Olympics appearances (overview)
- 1968; 1972–1976; 1980; 1984; 1988; 1992; 1996; 2000; 2004; 2008; 2012; 2016; 2020; 2024

Guinea competed at the 1996 Summer Olympics in Atlanta, United States.

== Competitors ==
The following is the list of number of competitors in the Games.

Sport	Men	Women	Total
Athletics	3	1	4
Boxing	1	–	1
Total	4	1	5

== Results by event ==
=== Athletics ===
==== Men ====
Track and road events

Athletes	Events	Heat Round 1		Heat Round 2		Semifinal		Final	
Athletes	Events	Time	Rank	Time	Rank	Time	Rank	Time	Rank
Robert Loua (Note: also competed at the 1988 Summer Olympics)	100 metres	11.21	100	Did not advance					
Joseph Loua	200 metres	20.81	37 q	21.01	36	Did not advance			
Amadou Sy Savané	400 metres hurdles	50.90	44	N/A		Did not advance			

==== Women ====
Track and road events

Athletes	Events	Heat Round 1		Heat Round 2		Semifinal		Final	
Athletes	Events	Time	Rank	Time	Rank	Time	Rank	Time	Rank
Sylla M'Mah Touré	200 metres	26.64	47	Did not advance					

=== Boxing ===
Athlete	Event	Round of 32	Round of 16	Quarterfinal	Semifinal	Final
Athlete	Event	Opposition Result	Opposition Result	Opposition Result	Opposition Result	Opposition Result
Aboubacar Diallo	Light-Welterweight	Süleymanoğlu (TUR); L 21-5	Did not advance			
