= Sékou Camara =

Sékou or Sekou Camara may refer to:

- Sekou Camara (athlete) (born 1959), Guinean middle-distance runner
- Sékou Camara (footballer, born 1985) (1985–2013), Malian football forward
- Sekou Camara (footballer, born 1997), Guinean football forward
- Sekou Camara (judoka) (born 1961), Guinean judoka
