= List of Guinean records in athletics =

The following are the national records in athletics in Guinea maintained by Guinea's national athletics federation: Fédération Guinéenne d'Athlétisme (FGA).

== Outdoor ==
Key to tables: Awaiting ratification Record not kept by FGA Not ratified or later rescinded by FGA

=== Men ===
Event	Record	Athlete	Date	Meet	Place	Ref.
100 m	10.56 (±0.0 m/s)	Joseph Loua	1 May 1997		L'Aigle, France	
200 m	20.53 (−2.2 m/s)	Joseph Loua	5 September 1997		Antananarivo, Madagascar	
400 m	47.60	Amadou Sy Savané	14 September 1995	All-Africa Games	Harare, Zimbabwe	
400 m	46.76	Amara Conte	26 May 2023		Rochester, United States	
800m	1:51.80	Mohamed Malal Sy Savané	1 August 1992	Olympic Games	Barcelona, Spain	
1500 m	3:51.96	Mohamed Malal Sy Savané	1 August 1992	Olympic Games	Barcelona, Spain	
3000 m	8:58.95	Abdourahamane Sow	19 July 2008		Valencia, Spain	
3000 m	8:44.8 h	Alkhassane Kake Makanera	26 June 2020		Tours, France	
5000 m	14:50.49	Abdoul Gadirou Bah	1 June 1985		Riga, Soviet Union	
10,000 m	32:27.5	Mohamed Malal Sy Savané	28/29 June 1989		Conakry, Guinea	
10 km (road)	31:40+	Alhassane Bangoura	24 September 2017	Berlin Marathon	Berlin, Germany	
15 km (road)	47:41+	Alhassane Bangoura	24 September 2017	Berlin Marathon	Berlin, Germany	
20 km (road)	1:04:09+	Alhassane Bangoura	24 September 2017	Berlin Marathon	Berlin, Germany	
Half marathon	1:16:20	Aboubacar Missika Diallo	2 December 1995	Semi-Marathon de la Ville d'Abidjan	Abidjan, Côte d'Ivoire	
Half marathon	1:07:45+	Alhassane Bangoura	24 September 2017	Berlin Marathon	Berlin, Germany	
25 km (road)	1:20:30+	Alhassane Bangoura	24 September 2017	Berlin Marathon	Berlin, Germany	
30 km (road)	1:37:03+	Alhassane Bangoura	24 September 2017	Berlin Marathon	Berlin, Germany	
Marathon	2:19:05	Alhassane Bangoura	24 September 2017	Berlin Marathon	Berlin, Germany	
110 m hurdles	14.67 (+1.3 m/s)	Moussa Conde	1 April 2017	Oliver Nikoloff Invitational	Cincinnati, United States	
400 m hurdles	50.81	Amadou Sy Savané	23 May 1998		Atlanta, United States	
3000 m steeplechase	10:27.2 h	Mamadou Diallo	18 July 1970		Dakar, Senegal	
High jump	1.90 m	Thomas Camara	4 July 1965		Conakry, Guinea	
Pole vault	5.00 m	Moussa Condé	27 May 2017	NAIA Championships	Gulf Shores, United States	
Long jump	7.39 m	Thiémo Amadou Barry	8 June 2013		L'Alfàs del Pi, Spain	
Triple jump	14.09 m	Souleymane Soumah	18 June 2017		Valence, France	
Shot put	12.68 m	Fodé Sidibé	27 May 1988		Conakry, Guinea	
Discus throw	40.00 m	Fodé Sidibé	25 April 1987		Fria, Guinea	
Hammer throw						
Javelin throw	56.00 m	Fodé Sidibé	26 June 1992		Fria, Guinea	
Decathlon						
Decathlon	100m / Long jump / Shot put / High jump / 400m / 110m H / Discus / Pole vault / Javelin / 1500m					
20 km walk (road)						
50 km walk (road)						
4 × 100 m relay	41.5 h	Guinea	5 January 1975		Fria, Guinea	
4 × 400 m relay	3:22.4 h	Guinea; Alhassane Bah; M. Camara; S. Damba; L. Diallo	28 May 1988		Conakry, Guinea	

=== Women ===
Event	Record	Athlete	Date	Meet	Place	Ref.
100 m	12.02	M'Mah Touré	1 June 1987		Dakar, Senegal	
100 m	11.97 (+1.1 m/s)	Safiatou Acquaviva	2 August 2024	Olympic Games	Paris, France	
200 m	24.99 (+1.7 m/s)	Asta Dramé (Note: Asta Dramé transferred to GUI from March 2010)	6 June 2010	Championnats de France	Vineuil, France	
200 m	23.42 (+0.1 m/s)	Fatouma Conde	17 September 2025	World Championships	Tokyo, Japan	
400 m	55.77	Kenza Marques-Sylla	9 July 2005		Saint-Étienne, France	
800 m	2:14.97	Aïssata Bangoura	13 July 1989	Jeux de la Francophonie	Casablanca, Morocco	
1500 m	4:36.70	Aïssata Bangoura	18 July 1989	Jeux de la Francophonie	Casablanca, Morocco	
3000 m	10:20.8 h	Aïssata Bangoura	4 August 1988		Conakry, Guinea	
5000 m	21:58.24	Kenza Marques-Sylla	9 June 2000		Kumasi, Ghana	
10,000 m	46:08.97 Mx	Aida Diallo-Camara	29 March 2014		La Seyne-sur-Mer, France	
Marathon	3:20:11	Aida Diallo-Camara	23 November 2003		Carqueiranne, France	
100 m hurdles	12.96 (+1.8 m/s)	Fatmata Fofanah	8 June 2007		Sacramento, United States	
400 m hurdles						
3000 m steeplechase						
High jump	1.93 m	Fatoumata Balley (Note: Fatoumata Balley became a French citizen in November 2014)	24 June 2026	Boris Hanžeković Memorial	Zagreb, Croatia	
Pole vault						
Long jump	5.72 m	Bountouraby Soumah	15 September 1990		Conakry, Guinea	
Triple jump	12.74 m	Maryama Bah	26 July 2000		Hagetmau, France	
Shot put	13.74 m	Mahawa Camara	29 May 2009		Lisses, France	
Discus throw	40.11 m	Mahawa Camara	3 March 2007		Nice, France	
Hammer throw	25.92 m	Fatoumata Keïta	21 May 2017		Châteauroux, France	
Javelin throw	28.44 m	Mahawa Camara	17 June 2007		Bondy, France	
Heptathlon	3750 pts	Mahawa Camara	16–17 June 2007		Bondy, France	
Heptathlon	100m H / High jump / Shot put / 200m / Long jump / Javelin / 800m; 17.73 / 1.45 m / 11.52 m / 27.89 / 4.57 m / 28.44 m / 2:46.13					
20 km walk (road)						
50 km walk (road)						
4 × 100 m relay	48.1 h	Guinea; Oumou Sow; K. Berete; R. Haba; Aminata Konaté	26 December 1990		Freetown, Sierra Leone	
4 × 400 m relay	4:02.4 h	Guinea	14 May 2017		Conakry, Guinea	

== Indoor ==
=== Men ===
Event	Record	Athlete	Date	Meet	Place	Ref.
60 m	6.80	Moussa Conde	21 January 2017		Indianapolis, United States	
200 m	21.42	Joseph Loua	2 February 1997		Vilafranca, Spain	
400 m	48.97 OT	Moussa Conde	10 February 2017		Allendale, United States	
800 m	2:01.34	Thierno-Ousmane Barry	5 December 2009		Eaubonne, France	
1000 m	2:59.91	Moussa Conde	31 January 2015	Razorback Invitational	Fayetteville, United States	
1500 m	4:20.87	Thierno-Ousmane Barry	6 December 2009		Eaubonne, France	
3000 m	8:46.70	Abdourahamane Sow	14 February 2009		San Sebastián	
60 m hurdles	8.24	Moussa Conde	9 December 2016	Winter Break Meet	Indianapolis, United States	
High jump	1.88 m	Moussa Conde	30 January 2015	Razorback Invitational	Fayetteville, United States	
Pole vault	5.04 m	Moussa Conde	14 February 2015	Fred Wilt Invitational	West Lafayette, United States	
Long jump	7.22 m	Thierno Amadou Barry	2 March 2013		Antequera, Spain	
Triple jump						
Shot put	10.73 m	Moussa Conde	27 February 2015		Geneva, United States	
Heptathlon	5167 pts	Moussa Conde	30–31 January 2015	Razorback Invitational	Fayetteville, United States	
Heptathlon	60m / Long jump / Shot put / High jump / 60m H / Pole vault / 1000m; 7.05 / 6.34m / 9.86m / 1.88m / 8.36m / 5.00m / 2:59.91					
5000 m walk						
4 × 400 m relay						

=== Women ===
Event	Record	Athlete	Date	Meet	Place	Ref.
60 m	7.73	Fatmata Fofanah	29 February 2008		Chapel Hill, United States	
200 m	24.72	Asta Dramé	31 January 2010		Aubière, France	
400 m	58.11	Kensa Marques Sylla	24 February 2006		Aubière, France	
800 m	2:40.9 h	Mahawa Camara	12 December 2004		Paris, France	
1500 m						
3000 m						
60 m hurdles	8.04	Fatmata Fofanah	11 January 2008		Lexington, United States	
60 m hurdles	8.04	Fatmata Fofanah	14 March 2008	NCAA Division I Championships	Fayetteville, United States	
High jump	1.92 m	Fatoumata Balley	17 January 2026	Meeting de Saut en Hauteur d'Hirson	Hirson, France	
Pole vault						
Long jump	5.48 m	Mahawa Camara	21 January 2006		Eaubonne, France	
Triple jump						
Shot put	13.01 m	Mahawa Camara	28 November 2007		Paris, France	
Pentathlon	3162 pts	Mahawa Camara	8 December 2007		Paris, France	
Pentathlon	60m H / High jump / Shot put / Long jump / 800m; 9.58 / 1.45 m / 12.80 m / 5.20 m / 2:48.83					
3000 m walk						
4 × 400 m relay						
