= Guinea at the 2024 Summer Paralympics =

- IPC code: GUI
- NPC: National Paralympic Committee Guinea

in Paris, France August 28, 2024 – September 8, 2024
- Competitors: 2 (1 man and 1 woman) in 1 sport
- Flag bearers: Kadiatou Bangoura; Yamoussa Sylla
- Medals: Gold 0 Silver 0 Bronze 0 Total 0

Summer Paralympics appearances (overview)
- 2004; 2008; 2012; 2016; 2020; 2024

Guinea competed at the 2024 Summer Paralympics in Paris, France, from 28 August to 8 September 2024. This was the nation's fifth time competing at the Summer Paralympic Games after it made its debut at the 2004 Summer Paralympics. The delegation consisted of two competitors from one sport.

== Competitors ==
The following is the list of number of competitors in the Games.

Sport	Men	Women	Total
Athletics	1	1	2
Total	1	1	2

== Athletics ==
Athlete	Event	Heat		Final	
Athlete	Event	Result	Rank	Result	Rank
Yamoussa Sylla	Men's 100 metres T47	12.11	7	Did not advance	
Yamoussa Sylla	Men's long jump T47	—		5.70	7
Kadiatou Bangoura	Women's 200 metres T47	28.47 SB	6	Did not advance	
Kadiatou Bangoura	Women's 400 metres T47	1:06.09	6	Did not advance	

== See also ==
- Guinea at the 2024 Summer Olympics
- Guinea at the Paralympics
