= List of participating nations at the Maccabiah Games =

This is a list of nations that have participated in the Maccabiah from the 1st Maccabiah to the 19th Maccabiah. As of the 19th Games, 110 nations have participated in at least one edition of the Maccabiah. The United States, the United Kingdom, Switzerland, Denmark, Austria, and France have competed in all nineteen Maccabiot.

== History ==
The first Maccabiah which was held on March 28, 1932, included 390 athletes from 18 countries. The second Maccabiah, which was held on April 2, 1935, increased the number of participating nations to 28 with over 1350 athletes. The two games included Arab nations such as Egypt, Syria, and Lebanon. The third Maccabiah, which was scheduled for spring of 38, was postponed until 1950, after the establishment of the state of Israel. Attendance for the third Maccabiah were considerably less than the previous two with only 20 nations due to various economical and political reasons.

The attended at the Maccabiah have slowly increased over the next three decade. surpassing 30 nations and close to 3,500 athletes in the 11th Maccabiah. By the 19th Maccabiah, which took place in 2013, the numbers have grown to 9,000 Jewish athletes from 76 nations.

== List of nations ==
=== Description ===
The list below includes all nations that have participated in at least one event in the Maccabiah, arranged alphabetically.

Several nations have changed during their Maccabiah history. Name changes due to geographical renaming are explained by footnotes after the nation's name, and other changes are explained by footnotes linked within the table itself. A select number of obsolete nations are also included in the table to more clearly illustrate past Maccabiah appearances for their successor nations:

==== Table legend ====
19	In the table headings, indicates the edition of the Maccabiah (1-22)
•	Participated in the specified Games
^{[A]}	Additional explanatory comments at the linked footnote
	Nation superseded or preceded by other nation(s) during these years

Contents:

Nation	1	2	3	4	5	6	7	8	9	10	11	12	13	14	15	16	17	18	19	20	21	22	Total
Albania																			•	•			2
Argentina			•	•	•	•	•	•	•	•	•	•	•	•	•	•	•	•	•	•	•		19
Armenia																			•				1
Aruba																			•				1
Australia	•		•	•	•	•	•	•	•	•	•	•	•	•	•	•	•	•	•	•	•		20
Austria	•	•	•	•	•	•	•	•	•	•	•	•	•	•	•	•	•	•	•	•			20
Azerbaijan																•	•		•	•	•		5
Bahamas																			•	•			2
Belarus														•		•	•		•				4
Belgium	•	•	•	•	•	•	•	•	•	•	•	•	•	•	•	•	•	•	•	•	•		20
Bermuda											•	•	•										3
Bolivia										•			•				•		•	•			5
Bosnia-Herzegovina																			•				1
Brazil				•	•	•	•	•	•	•	•	•	•	•	•	•	•	•	•	•	•		18
Bulgaria	•	•												•		•	•						5
Canada	•		•	•	•	•	•	•	•	•	•	•	•	•	•	•	•	•	•	•	•		20
Cayman Islands	•																			•	•		3
Chile				•	•	•	•	•	•	•	•	•	•	•	•	•	•	•	•	•	•		18
China																	•		•				2
Colombia						•						•	•	•	•	•	•	•	•	•	•		11
Congo DR						•						•	•										3
Costa Rica									•	•			•	•	•	•	•	•		•	•		10
Croatia														•	•	•	•		•				5
Cuba																			•	•	•		3
Curacao																			•				1
Cyprus																	•			•			2
Czech Republic	•	•												•	•		•	•	•	•	•		9
Denmark	•	•	•	•	•	•	•	•	•	•	•	•	•	•	•	•	•	•	•	•			20
Dominican Republic																				•			1
Ecuador												•							•				2
Egypt	•	•																					2
El Salvador																			•	•			2
Estonia	•	•												•				•	•	•	•		7
Ethiopia																		•					1
Finland			•	•	•	•	•	•	•	•	•	•	•	•	•	•	•	•	•	•	•		19
France	•	•	•	•	•	•	•	•	•	•	•	•	•	•	•	•	•	•	•	•	•		21
Georgia														•		•	•	•	•	•	•		7
Germany	•	•	•	•				•	•	•	•	•	•		•	•	•	•	•	•	•		18
Gibraltar												•	•	•		•			•	•	•		7
Great Britain	•	•	•	•	•	•	•	•	•	•	•	•	•	•	•	•	•	•	•	•	•		21
Greece	•	•						•					•			•	•		•	•	•		9
Grenada																		•					1
Guam												•											1
Guatemala						•		•					•	•		•	•	•	•	•			9
Guinea-Bissau																			•				1
Honduras																			•	•	•		3
Hong Kong													•	•					•	•	•		5
Hungary	•	•											•	•		•	•	•	•	•	•		10
India			•	•	•	•	•	•				•	•		•		•	•	•	•	•		14
Iran							•	•	•														3
Ireland			•	•	•	•	•	•					•		•					•	•		10
Israel	•	•	•	•	•	•	•	•	•	•	•	•	•	•	•	•	•	•	•	•	•	•	22
Italy		•	•	•	•	•	•	•	•	•	•	•	•	•	•	•	•	•	•	•	•	•	20
Jamaica							•													•			2
Japan										•	•	•	•							•	•		6
Kazakhstan																			•	•	•		3
Kyrgyzstan															•				•	•	•		4
Latvia	•	•												•		•	•	•	•	•			8
Lebanon	•																						1
Libya		•	•																				2
Lithuania	•	•											•	•	•	•	•	•	•	•	•		11
Luxembourg																	•	•	•				3
Malta															•								1
Mauritius																			•				1
Mexico					•	•	•	•	•	•	•	•	•	•	•	•	•	•	•	•	•		17
Moldova															•	•	•	•	•	•	•		7
Mongolia																			•				1
Morocco		•																	•	•			3
Netherlands	•	•	•	•	•	•	•	•	•	•	•	•	•	•		•	•	•	•	•	•		20
New Zealand											•	•	•	•	•	•	•	•					8
Nicaragua																			•				1
Norway										•	•	•	•	•	•				•	•			8
North Macedonia																	•	•	•	•			4
Palau																		•					1
Panama												•	•	•	•	•	•			•	•		8
Paraguay														•	•	•	•	•	•	•	•		8
Peru							•	•				•	•	•			•	•	•	•	•		10
Philippines																						•	1
Poland	•	•												•	•	•	•	•	•	•	•		10
Portugal														•	•		•	•	•	•		•	7
Puerto Rico											•	•	•					•		•	•		6
Romania	•	•												•	•		•	•	•		•	•	9
Russia													•	•	•	•	•	•	•				6
Samoa														•									1
Scotland																		•	•	•			3
Serbia	•	•									•	•					•	•	•	•	•		9
Singapore													•		•		•	•		•	•		6
Slovakia															•		•	•	•	•	•		6
Slovenia																•		•	•	•			4
South Africa		•	•	•	•	•	•	•	•	•	•	•	•	•	•	•	•	•	•	•	•		20
South Korea													•	•					•	•			4
Spain													•	•	•	•	•	•	•	•	•		9
Suriname																			•				1
Sweden			•			•	•	•	•	•	•	•	•	•	•	•	•	•	•	•	•		17
Switzerland	•	•	•	•	•	•	•	•	•	•	•	•	•	•	•	•	•	•	•	•	•		21
Syria	•	•																					2
Taiwan																•				•		•	3
Thailand																		•					1
Tunisia	•																						1
Turkey	•	•	•	•	•	•	•	•			•		•	•	•	•	•	•	•	•	•		18
Ukraine														•		•	•	•	•	•	•		7
Uruguay						•		•				•	•			•	•		•	•	•		9
United Arab Emirates																							0
United States	•	•	•	•	•	•	•	•	•	•	•	•	•	•	•	•	•	•	•	•	•	•	22
Uzbekistan																			•	•			2
U.S. Virgin Islands												•							•				2
Venezuela							•	•	•	•	•	•	•	•		•	•	•		•	•		13
Zambia																				•	•		2
Zimbabwe				•	•	•	•	•							•		•		•	•	•	•	11
Olim																					•		1
MWU																				•	•		2
EMU																				•	•		2
CLAM																						•	1
Danzig	•	•	See Poland																				2
Total	27	28	20	22	20	27	27	27	26	34	34	37	45	48	33	49	55	55	77	85			

== See also ==
- List of participating nations at the Winter Olympic Games
- List of participating nations at the Summer Olympic Games

== Notes ==
Zaire: The Democratic Republic of the Congo was known as Zaire (ZAI) between 1984 and 1996.
