= Ousmane Diallo =

Ousmane Diallo may refer to:

- Ousmane Diallo (wrestler) (born 1968), Guinean wrestler
- Ousmane Diallo (footballer) (born 2007), Spanish footballer
