= Guinea at the 2012 Summer Olympics =

- IOC code: GUI
- NOC: Comité National Olympique et Sportif Guinéen

in London
- Competitors: 4 in 3 sports
- Flag bearer: Facinet Keita
- Medals: Gold 0 Silver 0 Bronze 0 Total 0

Summer Olympics appearances (overview)
- 1968; 1972–1976; 1980; 1984; 1988; 1992; 1996; 2000; 2004; 2008; 2012; 2016; 2020; 2024

Guinea competed at the 2012 Summer Olympics in London, from 27 July to 12 August 2012. This was the nation's tenth appearance at the Olympics, excluding the 1972 Summer Olympics in Munich, and the 1976 Summer Olympics in Montreal because of the African boycott.

Four Guinean athletes were selected to the team, competing only in athletics, judo, and swimming. Heavyweight judoka Facinet Keita was the nation's flag bearer at the opening ceremony. Guinea, however, has yet to win its first ever Olympic medal.

== Athletics ==
Men

Athlete	Event	Heat		Semifinal		Final	
Athlete	Event	Result	Rank	Result	Rank	Result	Rank
Mamadou Barry	1500 m	4:05.08	14	did not advance			

Women

Athlete	Event	Heat		Quarterfinal		Semifinal		Final	
Athlete	Event	Result	Rank	Result	Rank	Result	Rank	Result	Rank
Aissata Toure	100 m	13.25	7	did not advance					

Key

- Note–Ranks given for track events are within the athlete's heat only
- Q = Qualified for the next round
- q = Qualified for the next round as a fastest loser or, in field events, by position without achieving the qualifying target
- NR = National record
- N/A = Round not applicable for the event
- Bye = Athlete not required to compete in round

== Judo ==
Guinea has qualified 1 judoka.

Athlete	Event	Round of 32	Round of 16	Quarterfinals	Semifinals	Repechage	Final / BM	
Athlete	Event	Opposition Result	Opposition Result	Opposition Result	Opposition Result	Opposition Result	Opposition Result	Rank
Facinet Keita	Men's +100 kg	Blas Jr. (GUM); L 0002–0101	did not advance					

== Swimming ==
Guinea has gained a "Universality place" from the FINA.

Women

Athlete	Event	Heat		Semifinal		Final	
Athlete	Event	Time	Rank	Time	Rank	Time	Rank
Dede Camara	100 m breaststroke	1:38.54	46	did not advance			
