= Guinea at the 2008 Summer Paralympics =

- IPC code: GUI
- NPC: Guinea Paralympic Committee

in Beijing
- Competitors: 1 in 1 sport
- Flag bearer: Ahmed Barry
- Medals: Gold 0 Silver 0 Bronze 0 Total 0

Summer Paralympics appearances (overview)
- 2004; 2008; 2012; 2016; 2020; 2024

Guinea sent a single athlete, Ahmed Barry, to compete at the 2008 Summer Paralympics in Beijing, People's Republic of China. He entered the men's 200 m T46 as his only event, but was a non-starter.

== Athletics ==
=== Men's track ===
Athlete	Class	Event	Heats		Semifinal		Final	
Athlete	Class	Event	Result	Rank	Result	Rank	Result	Rank
Ahmed Barry	T46	200m	DNS		did not advance			

== See also ==
- Guinea at the Paralympics
- Guinea at the 2008 Summer Olympics
