= Guinea at the 2016 Summer Paralympics =

- IPC code: GUI
- NPC: Guinea Paralympic Committee

in Rio de Janeiro
- Competitors: 1 in 1 sports
- Medals: Gold 0 Silver 0 Bronze 0 Total 0

Summer Paralympics appearances (overview)
- 2004; 2008; 2012; 2016; 2020; 2024

Guinea competed at the 2016 Summer Paralympics in Rio de Janeiro, Brazil, from 7 September to 18 September 2016.

== Funding and support ==
Funding issues proved a major challenge for Guinea's participation at the 2016 Summer Paralympics. The NPC relies on grants to insure they can buy plane tickets to fund travel to international events, and there were problems acquiring grant funding because of shortfalls in funds from the Brazilian organizers. This was in part a result of only 220,000 of the 2.5 million tickets to watch the Games in Rio being sold a month ahead of the Games.

== Disability classifications ==
Every participant at the Paralympics has their disability grouped into one of five disability categories; amputation, the condition may be congenital or sustained through injury or illness; cerebral palsy; wheelchair athletes, there is often overlap between this and other categories; visual impairment, including blindness; Les autres, any physical disability that does not fall strictly under one of the other categories, for example dwarfism or multiple sclerosis. Each Paralympic sport then has its own classifications, dependent upon the specific physical demands of competition. Events are given a code, made of numbers and letters, describing the type of event and classification of the athletes competing. Some sports, such as athletics, divide athletes by both the category and severity of their disabilities, other sports, for example swimming, group competitors from different categories together, the only separation being based on the severity of the disability.

== Athletics ==
Men's Track

Athlete	Events	Heat		Final	
Athlete	Events	Time	Rank	Time	Rank
Mohamed Camara	400 m T45-47	57.55	6	did not advance	

== See also ==
- Guinea at the 2016 Summer Olympics
