= Guinea at the 1988 Summer Olympics =

- IOC code: GUI
- NOC: Comité National Olympique et Sportif Guinéen

in Seoul
- Competitors: 6 in 3 sports
- Flag bearer: Ousmane Diallo
- Medals: Gold 0 Silver 0 Bronze 0 Total 0

Summer Olympics appearances (overview)
- 1968; 1972–1976; 1980; 1984; 1988; 1992; 1996; 2000; 2004; 2008; 2012; 2016; 2020; 2024

Guinea competed at the 1988 Summer Olympics in Seoul, South Korea.

== Competitors ==
The following is the list of number of competitors in the Games.

Sport	Men	Women	Total
Athletics	2	0	2
Boxing	2	–	2
Wrestling	2	–	2
Total	6	0	6

== Athletics ==
Men
Track and road events

Athlete	Event	Heat Round 1		Heat Round 2		Semifinal		Final	
Athlete	Event	Time	Rank	Time	Rank	Time	Rank	Time	Rank
Robert Loua (Note: also competed at the 1996 Summer Olympics)	100 metres	11.20	92	Did not advance					
Robert Loua	200 metres	22.78	68	Did not advance					
Alassane Bah	Marathon	—						3:06:27	96

== Boxing ==
Athlete	Event	Round of 64	Round of 32	Round of 16	Quarterfinals	Semifinals	Final	
Athlete	Event	Opposition Result	Opposition Result	Opposition Result	Opposition Result	Opposition Result	Opposition Result	Rank
Samba Jacob Diallo	Bantamweight	Nieves (PUR); L 0–5	Did not advance					
Serigne Fall	Featherweight	Eskelinen (FIN); L 0–5	Did not advance					

== Wrestling ==
Freestyle

Athlete	Event	Group Stage								Final	
Athlete	Event	Opposition Result	Opposition Result	Opposition Result	Opposition Result	Opposition Result	Opposition Result	Opposition Result	Rank	Opposition Result	Rank
Ousmane Diallo	52 kg	Trstena (YUG); L 0–15	Yordanov (BUL); L 1–17	Did not advance					10	Did not advance	
Mamadou Diaw Diallo	74 kg	Kumar (IND); L Passivity	Diouf (SEN); W Passivity	Westendorf (GDR); L Fall	Did not advance				11	Did not advance	
