= Nations at the Olympics =

Nations at the Olympics or Olympic Nations may refer to:

- List of participating nations at the Summer Olympic Games
- List of participating nations at the Winter Olympic Games
- Countries with recognized National Olympic Committees, qualifying their athletes to participate in the Olympic Games
