= Guinea at the Olympics =

- IOC code: GUI
- NOC: Comité National Olympique et Sportif Guinéen
- Medals: Gold 0 Silver 0 Bronze 0 Total 0

Summer appearances
- 1968; 1972–1976; 1980; 1984; 1988; 1992; 1996; 2000; 2004; 2008; 2012; 2016; 2020; 2024

Guinea has sent athletes to every Summer Olympic Games held since 1968 except for 1972 and 1976, although the country has never won an Olympic medal. No athletes from Guinea have competed in any Winter Olympic Games.

The National Olympic Committee was created in 1964 and recognized by the International Olympic Committee in 1965.

== Medal tables ==
=== Medals by Summer Games ===
Games	Athletes	Gold	Silver	Bronze	Total	Rank
1968 Mexico City	15	0	0	0	0	–
1972 Munich	did not participate					
1976 Montreal	did not participate					
1980 Moscow	10	0	0	0	0	–
1984 Los Angeles	1	0	0	0	0	–
1988 Seoul	6	0	0	0	0	–
1992 Barcelona	8	0	0	0	0	–
1996 Atlanta	5	0	0	0	0	–
2000 Sydney	6	0	0	0	0	–
2004 Athens	3	0	0	0	0	–
2008 Beijing	5	0	0	0	0	–
2012 London	4	0	0	0	0	–
2016 Rio de Janeiro	5	0	0	0	0	–
2020 Tokyo	5	0	0	0	0	–
2024 Paris	24	0	0	0	0	–
2028 Los Angeles	future event					
2032 Brisbane	future event					
Total		0	0	0	0	–

== Olympic participants ==
=== Summer Olympics ===
Sport	1968	1980	1984	1988	1992	1996	2000	2004	2008	2012	2016	2020	2024	Athletes
Archery													1	1
Athletics		3		2	5	4	2	2	2	2	2	1	1	20
Boxing		3		2		1	1							6
Football	15												18	33
Judo		3	1		3		1	1		1	1	1	2	13
Swimming							2	1	2	1	2	2	2	12
Taekwondo									1					1
Wrestling				2								1		3

== See also ==
- List of flag bearers for Guinea at the Olympics
- Guinea at the Paralympics
