= Guinea at the 2024 Summer Olympics =

- IOC code: GUI
- NOC: Comité National Olympique et Sportif Guinéen

in Paris, France 26 July 2024 – 11 August 2024
- Competitors: 24 (19 men and 5 women) in 5 sports
- Flag bearers (opening): Naby Keïta & Fatoumata Sylla
- Flag bearers (closing): Elhadj N'Gnane Diallo & Fatoumata Sylla
- Medals: Gold 0 Silver 0 Bronze 0 Total 0

Summer Olympics appearances (overview)
- 1968; 1972–1976; 1980; 1984; 1988; 1992; 1996; 2000; 2004; 2008; 2012; 2016; 2020; 2024

Guinea competed at the 2024 Summer Olympics in Paris, France, from 26 July to 11 August 2024. It was the nation's thirteenth appearance at the Summer Olympics, dating back to their official debut in 1968.

== Competitors ==
The following is the list of number of competitors in the Games.

Sport	Men	Women	Total
Archery	0	1	1
Athletics	0	1	1
Football	18	0	18
Judo	0	2	2
Swimming	1	1	2
Total	19	5	24

== Archery ==
Guinea entered one female archer to compete at Paris 2024 in the individual recurve competition after receiving the allocations of universality spots. This will mark the first time Guinea have sent an archer to the games.

Athlete	Event	Ranking round		Round of 64	Round of 32	Round of 16	Quarterfinals	Semifinals	Final / BM	
Athlete	Event	Score	Seed	Opposition Score	Opposition Score	Opposition Score	Opposition Score	Opposition Score	Opposition Score	Rank
Fatoumata Sylla	Women's individual	619	61	Kaufhold (USA); L 2–6	Did not advance					

== Athletics ==
Guinea sent one sprinter to compete at the 2024 Summer Olympics.

Key

- Note–Ranks given for track events are within the athlete's heat only
- Q = Qualified for the next round
- q = Qualified for the next round as a fastest loser or, in field events, by position without achieving the qualifying target
- NR = National record
- N/A = Round not applicable for the event
- Bye = Athlete not required to compete in round

Track events

Athlete	Event	Preliminary		Heat		Semifinal		Final	
Athlete	Event	Result	Rank	Result	Rank	Result	Rank	Result	Rank
Safiatou Acquaviva	Women's 100 m	11.97	5 q	12.07	9	Did Not Advance			

== Football ==
Summary

Key:

- A.E.T – After extra time.
- P – Match decided by penalty-shootout.

Team	Event	Group Stage				Quarterfinal	Semifinal	Final / BM	
Team	Event	Opposition Score	Opposition Score	Opposition Score	Rank	Opposition Score	Opposition Score	Opposition Score	Rank
Guinea men's	Men's tournament	New Zealand; L 1–2	France; L 0–1	United States; L 0–3	4	Did not advance			

=== Men's tournament ===
For the first time since 1968, Guinea men's football team qualified for the Olympics after winning the advancing to the finals of the AFC–CAF play-off in Clairefontaine-en-Yvelines, France.

Team roster

Guinea announced their final squad on 4 July 2024. Aguibou Camara withdrew from the squad on 10 July after his club refused to release him, and was replaced by Sékou Tidiany Bangoura.

Head coach: Kaba Diawara

No.	Pos.	Player	Date of birth (age)	Caps	Goals	Club
1	GK	Soumaïla Sylla	15 March 2004 (aged 20)	1	0	(French Football Federation) Reims
2	DF	Naby Oularé	6 August 2002 (aged 21)	5	0	(Turkish Football Federation) Boluspor
3	DF	Bangaly Cissé	28 December 2002 (aged 21)	4	0	(Guinean Football Federation) Kaloum
4	DF	Mohamed Soumah	13 March 2003 (aged 21)	7	0	(Royal Belgian Football Association) Gent
5	DF	Rayane Doucouré	30 March 2001 (aged 23)	0	0	(French Football Federation) Red Star
6	MF	Amadou Diawara*	17 July 1997 (aged 27)	0	0	(Royal Belgian Football Association) Anderlecht
7	FW	Aliou Baldé	12 December 2002 (aged 21)	0	0	(French Football Federation) Nice
8	MF	Naby Keïta* (captain)	10 February 1995 (aged 29)	0	0	(German Football Association) Werder Bremen
9	FW	Henry Camara	6 May 2006 (aged 18)	0	0	(Italian Football Federation) Atalanta
10	MF	Ilaix Moriba	19 January 2003 (aged 21)	1	1	(Royal Spanish Football Federation) Getafe
11	FW	Ousmane Camara	3 November 2001 (aged 22)	7	0	(French Football Federation) Annecy
12	FW	Algassime Bah	12 November 2002 (aged 21)	7	1	(Hellenic Football Federation) Olympiacos
13	DF	Madiou Keita	29 August 2004 (aged 19)	6	0	(French Football Federation) Auxerre
14	FW	Amadou Diallo	13 July 2006 (aged 18)	1	0	(French Football Federation) Rennes
15	MF	Issiaga Camara	2 February 2005 (aged 19)	1	0	(French Football Federation) Nice
16	GK	Mory Keita	13 July 2005 (aged 19)	5	0	(Guinean Football Federation) Sangarédi
17	MF	Abdoulaye Touré*	3 March 1994 (aged 30)	0	0	(French Football Federation) Le Havre
18	MF	Sekou Tidiany Bangoura	5 April 2002 (aged 22)	3	0	(Turkish Football Federation) Tuzlaspor
20	DF	Chérif Camara	21 October 2002 (aged 21)	2	0	(Guinean Football Federation) Hafia
21	MF	Lass Kourouma	30 March 2004 (aged 20)	0	0	(Royal Spanish Football Federation) Levante

* Overage player.

Group play

Pos	Team	Pld	W	D	L	GF	GA	GD	Pts	Qualification
1	France (H)	3	3	0	0	7	0	+7	9	Advance to knockout stage
2	United States	3	2	0	1	7	4	+3	6	Advance to knockout stage
3	New Zealand	3	1	0	2	3	8	−5	3	
4	Guinea	3	0	0	3	1	6	−5	0	

Source: FIFA
Rules for classification: Group stage tiebreakers
(H) Hosts
24 July 2024
17:00

Guinea	1–2	New Zealand
Diawara 72'	Report	Garbett 25'; Waine 76'

Stade de Nice, Nice
Attendance: 4,909
Referee: Adel Al-Naqbi (United Arab Emirates)

27 July 2024
21:00

France	1–0	Guinea
Sildillia 75'	Report

Stade de Nice, Nice
Attendance: 25,965
Referee: Ilgiz Tantashev (Uzbekistan)

30 July 2024
19:00

United States	3–0	Guinea
Mihailovic 14'; Paredes 31', 75'	Report

Stade Geoffroy-Guichard, Saint-Étienne
Attendance: 6,245
Referee: Tess Olofsson (Sweden)

== Judo ==
Guinea qualified two judokas for the following weight classes at the Games. Mariana Esteves (women's lightweight, 57 kg) and Marie Branser (women's heavyweight, 78 kg) got qualified via quota based on IJF World Ranking List and continental quota based on Olympic point rankings.

Athlete	Event	Round of 64	Round of 32	Round of 16	Quarterfinals	Semifinals	Repechage	Final / BM	
Athlete	Event	Opposition Result	Opposition Result	Opposition Result	Opposition Result	Opposition Result	Opposition Result	Opposition Result	Rank
Mariana Esteves	Women's −57 kg	—	Escano (GUM); W 10−00	Cysique (FRA); L 00−10	Did not advance				
Marie Branser	Women's −78 kg	—	Villiers (NZL); W 10−00	Wagner (GER); L 00−11	Did not advance				

== Swimming ==
Guinea sent two swimmers to compete at the 2024 Paris Olympics.

Athlete	Event	Heat		Semifinal		Final	
Athlete	Event	Time	Rank	Time	Rank	Time	Rank
Elhadj Diallo	Men's 50 m freestyle	26.45	57	Did not advance			
Djenabou Jolie Bah	Women's 50 m freestyle	31.90	69	Did not advance			

Qualifiers for the latter rounds (Q) of all events were decided on a time only basis, therefore positions shown are overall results versus competitors in all heats.
