= Guinea at the 1983 World Championships in Athletics =

- Flag of Guinea
- WA code: GUI

in Helsinki, Finland August 7–14, 1983
- Competitors: 2 (1 man and 1 woman) in 4 events
- Medals: Gold 0 Silver 0 Bronze 0 Total 0

World Championships in Athletics appearances
- 1983; 1987; 1991; 1993; 1995; 1997; 1999; 2001; 2003; 2005; 2007; 2009; 2011; 2013; 2015; 2017; 2019; 2022; 2023

Guinea competed at the 1983 World Championships in Athletics in Helsinki, Finland, from August 7 to 14, 1983.

== Men ==
Track and road events

Athlete	Event	Heat		Semifinal		Final	
Athlete	Event	Result	Rank	Result	Rank	Result	Rank
Sekou Camara	800 metres	1:59.90	57	Did not advance			
Sekou Camara	1500 metres	4:08.46	50	Did not advance			

== Women ==
Track and road events

Athlete	Event	Heat		Quarterfinal		Semifinal		Final	
Athlete	Event	Result	Rank	Result	Rank	Result	Rank	Result	Rank
Koumba Kante	100 metres	13.37w	45	Did not advance					
Koumba Kante	200 metres	27.86	38	Did not advance					
