= List of participating nations at the Winter Olympic Games =

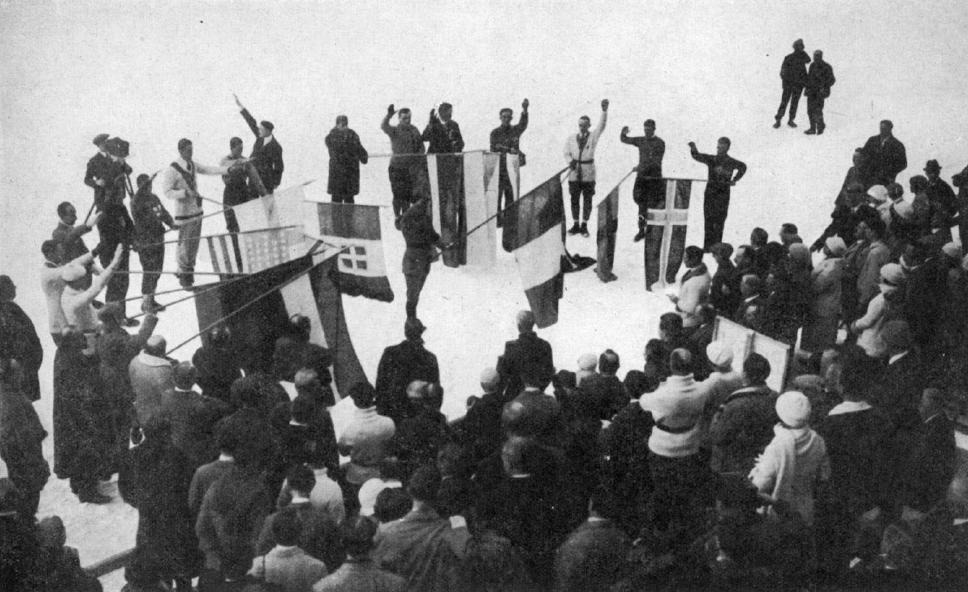
Flagbearers for each of the participating nations at the I Olympic Winter Games (1924) recite the athlete's oath.

This is a list of nations, as represented by National Olympic Committees (NOCs), that have participated in the Winter Olympic Games between 1924 and 2026. The Winter Olympic Games have been held every four years (once during each Olympiad) since 1924, except for the cancelled Games of 1940 and 1944, and in 1994 when the Winter Games were moved to the middle of the Olympiad, two years after the previous Games.

133 NOCs (121 of the current 206 NOCs and 12 obsolete NOCs) have participated in at least one Winter Games, and twelve nations (Austria, Canada, Finland, France, Great Britain, Hungary, Italy, Norway, Poland, Sweden, Switzerland, and the United States) have participated in all twenty-three Winter Games to date. Including continuity from Czechoslovakia, the Czech Republic and Slovakia have also been represented in every edition.

== History ==
=== Origin and early Games ===
The first winter sport to be contested at the modern Olympic Games was figure skating at the 1908 Games in London. A total of 21 skaters from six countries (Argentina, Germany, Great Britain, Sweden, Russia, and the United States) competed in four events on 28–29 October. Skating was not in the program of the 1912 Summer Olympics in Stockholm, but returned for the 1920 Games in Antwerp. Ice hockey was also part of the 1920 program of events, with seven teams competing.

The first Winter Games were held in 1924, in Chamonix, France. They were originally called International Winter Sports Week and held in association with the 1924 Summer Olympics, but were in retrospect designated by the International Olympic Committee (IOC) as the I Olympic Winter Games. Sixteen nations participated in these Games: fourteen from Europe and two from North America. Four years later, 25 nations were represented at the 1928 Winter Olympics, in St. Moritz, Switzerland, including Argentina (the first nation from the Southern Hemisphere), Japan (the first Asian nation), and Mexico. The 1932 Games, held in Lake Placid, United States, saw the participation of 17 nations. The 1936 Winter Games, in Garmisch-Partenkirchen, Germany, had 28 participating nations, the largest number to that date. These would be the last Winter Games for twelve years, as the planned 1940 Games and 1944 Games were cancelled due to World War II.

=== Post-war years and Cold War era ===
After the war, 28 nations would return to St. Moritz for the 1948 Winter Olympics, but not Germany or Japan, who were not invited because of their roles in the war. The 1952 Winter Games in Oslo, Norway, featured 30 participating nations. The 1956 Games in Cortina d'Ampezzo, Italy, marked the Winter Games debut of the Soviet Union, along with 31 other nations. The NOCs of East Germany and West Germany would be represented by a single German team, an arrangement that would continue until 1964. Thirty nations would participate at the 1960 Winter Olympics in Squaw Valley, United States, including South Africa, the first African nation to participate in the Winter Games. Thirty-six nations were represented in Innsbruck, Austria, in 1964.

The 1968 Winter Olympics in Grenoble, France, marked the first time that East Germany and West Germany competed as independent teams, two of the 37 nations that took part. The Games of 1972 were held in Sapporo, Japan, the first time the Winter Games were held outside of Europe or North America. A total of 35 nations were represented, including the Philippines, the first appearance by a southeast Asian nation. The Winter Games returned to Innsbruck, in 1976, with 37 participating nations.

Lake Placid was the site of the Winter Games in 1980, with 37 competing nations. The People's Republic of China made their Olympic debut but, in response, the Republic of China boycotted the Games, protesting their inability to use the name "China" after the decision by the IOC. Sarajevo, SFR Yugoslavia was host to the 1984 Winter Olympics, which welcomed 49 nations. Puerto Rico and the Virgin Islands were the first two Caribbean NOCs to compete in the Winter Games. Several more tropical nations would participate at the 1988 Winter Olympics, in Calgary, Canada, including the famed Jamaica national bobsleigh team.

=== Recent Games ===
The post-Cold War events of the early 1990s led to a large increase in participating nations at the Olympics. At the 1992 Games, in Albertville, France, a total of 64 NOCs were represented, including a single Germany team—following the German reunification in 1990—and a Unified Team composed of six of the ex-republics of the Soviet Union. The Baltic states competed independently for the first time since 1936, and some of the ex-Yugoslav nations started to compete independently in 1992.

In October 1986, the IOC had voted to hold the Olympic Winter Games halfway through the four-year Olympiad, rather than in the same year as the summer Games, and this change started with the XVIIth Olympic Winter Games in 1994 in Lillehammer, Norway. A total of 67 nations took part, including the Czech Republic and Slovakia as independent teams, and each of the ex-Soviet nations. Pakistan debuted in the Winter Olympics in 2010. Nigeria debuted in the Winter Olympics several years later, in 2018.

The Winter Games continued to grow in the recent past, with 72 nations at the 1998 Winter Olympics, in Nagano, Japan, 77 nations at the 2002 Winter Olympics, in Salt Lake City, United States, 80 nations at the 2006 Winter Olympics, in Turin, Italy, 82 nations at the 2010 Winter Olympics in Vancouver, Canada, 88 nations at the 2014 Winter Olympics in Sochi, Russia, and a record 93 nations at the 2018 Games.

== List of nations ==
Blue represents nations that participated in the Winter Olympics and gray represents those that never participated.

=== Description ===
This list includes 129 NOCs (119 of the current 206 NOCs and 11 obsolete NOCs), arranged alphabetically. The three-letter country code is also listed for each NOC. Since the 1960s, these codes have been frequently used by the IOC and each Games organizing committee to identify NOCs, such as within the official report of each Games. However, in this section, several countries which have long-form names designated by the United Nations are referred to by their common names, such as Laos (Lao People's Democratic Republic), North Korea (Democratic People's Republic of Korea), and Moldova (Republic of Moldova).

Several nations have changed during their Olympic history. Name changes due to geographical renaming are explained by footnotes after the nation's name, and other changes are explained by footnotes links within the table itself.

=== Obsolete nations ===
Obsolete nations are included in the table to more clearly illustrate past Olympic appearances for their successor nations.

- TCH. Czechoslovakia (TCH) participated in 1924–1992, from 1994 represented by two successor NOCs of Czech Republic (CZE) and Slovakia (SVK).
- EUA, FRG, GDR. For the Games of 1956–1964, Germany participated as a United Team of Germany (GER), representing the National Olympic Committees of both West Germany and East Germany. Retrospectively, the IOC uses the country code EUA for this team. After the NOC for the German Democratic Republic was granted full recognition by the IOC in 1968, East Germany (GDR) and West Germany (FRG) participated as two distinct teams at the Games of 1968–1988 before the German Reunification in 1990.
- AHO. The NOC of the Netherlands Antilles (AHO) was recognized by the IOC from 1950 until 2011 upon the dissolution of the Netherlands Antilles.
- URS, EUN, OAR, ROC, AIN. Soviet Union (URS) participated at the Games of 1956–1988. After the dissolution of the Soviet Union in 1991, nine of the fifteen ex-republics of the Soviet Union were represented at the 1992 Winter Olympics as a combined Unified Team (EUN). Since 1994 ex-republics of the Soviet Union are represented by fifteen successor NOCs, fourteen of which have participated in the Winter Games. At the 2018 and 2022 Winter Olympics, athletes from Russia competed as Olympic Athletes from Russia (OAR) and Russian Olympic Committee (ROC), respectively. They also competed as Individual Neutral Athletes (AIN) at the 2026 Winter Olympics due to the Russia-Ukraine warzones.
- YUG, SCG. The Kingdom of Yugoslavia (officially the Kingdom of Serbs, Croats and Slovenes until 1929) participated as Yugoslavia (YUG) in three Games before the World War II. The Socialist Federal Republic of Yugoslavia also participated using the Yugoslavia designation, for all but one Games between 1948 and 1992, and hosted the 1984 Winter Olympics in Sarajevo. The Federal Republic of Yugoslavia (later the State Union of Serbia and Montenegro), consisting of the Republic of Serbia and the Republic of Montenegro, participated at the Games of 1998 and the Games of 2002 as Yugoslavia (YUG) and at the Games of 2006 as Serbia and Montenegro (SCG). Now the six ex-republics and one ex-province of the former Yugoslavia represented by seven successor NOCs, of which all have participated in the Winter Games.
- COR. The Korea (COR) designates the united Korean women's ice hockey team at 2018 Games.

=== Table legend ===
24	In the table headings, indicates the Games year
•	Participated in the specified Games
H	Host nation for the specified Games
^{[A]}	Additional explanatory comments at the linked footnote
	The planned Games of 1940 and 1944 were cancelled due to World War II
	NOC superseded or preceded by other NOC(s) during these years

=== Alphabetical list ===
A	Code	24	28	32	36	40	44	48	52	56	60	64	68	72	76	80	84	88	92	94	98	02	06	10	14	18	22	26	Total
Albania	ALB																						•	•	•	•	•	•	6
Algeria	ALG	France						France											•				•	•					3
American Samoa	ASA																			•							•		2
Andorra	AND														•	•	•	•	•	•	•	•	•	•	•	•	•	•	14
Argentina	ARG		•					•	•		•	•	•	•	•	•	•	•	•	•	•	•	•	•	•	•	•	•	21
Armenia	ARM	Soviet Union						Soviet Union												•	•	•	•	•	•	•	•	•	9
Australia	AUS				•				•	•	•	•	•	•	•	•	•	•	•	•	•	•	•	•	•	•	•	•	21
Austria	AUT	•	•	•	•			•	•	•	•	H	•	•	H	•	•	•	•	•	•	•	•	•	•	•	•	•	25
Azerbaijan	AZE	Soviet Union						Soviet Union													•	•	•	•	•	•	•	•	8
B	Code	24	28	32	36	40	44	48	52	56	60	64	68	72	76	80	84	88	92	94	98	02	06	10	14	18	22	26	Total
Belarus	BLR	Soviet Union						Soviet Union											^{EUN}	•	•	•	•	•	•	•	•	^{AIN}	8
Belgium	BEL	•	•	•	•			•	•	•		•		•	•	•	•	•	•	•	•	•	•	•	•	•	•	•	23
Benin	BEN																											•	1
Bermuda	BER																		•	•	•	•	•	•	•	•			8
Bolivia	BOL									•						•	•	•	•							•	•	•	8
Bosnia and Herzegovina	BIH	Yugoslavia						Yugoslavia												•	•	•	•	•	•	•	•	•	9
Brazil	BRA																		•	•	•	•	•	•	•	•	•	•	10
British Virgin Islands	IVB																•								•				2
Bulgaria	BUL				•			•	•	•	•	•	•	•	•	•	•	•	•	•	•	•	•	•	•	•	•	•	22
C	Code	24	28	32	36	40	44	48	52	56	60	64	68	72	76	80	84	88	92	94	98	02	06	10	14	18	22	26	Total
Cameroon	CMR																					•							1
Canada	CAN	•	•	•	•			•	•	•	•	•	•	•	•	•	•	H	•	•	•	•	•	H	•	•	•	•	25
Cayman Islands	CAY																							•	•				2
Chile	CHI							•	•	•	•	•	•		•		•	•	•	•	•	•	•	•	•	•	•	•	19
China	CHN															•	•	•	•	•	•	•	•	•	•	•	H	•	13
Chinese Taipei (Taiwan)	TPE	Japan												•	•		•	•	•	•	•	•	•	•	•	•	•	•	14
Colombia	COL																							•		•	•	•	4
Costa Rica	CRC															•	•	•	•			•^{[B]}	•						6
Croatia	CRO	Yugoslavia						Yugoslavia											•	•	•	•	•	•	•	•	•	•	10
Cyprus	CYP															•	•	•	•	•	•	•	•	•	•	•	•	•	13
Czech Republic	CZE	Czechoslovakia						Czechoslovakia												•	•	•	•	•	•	•	•	•	9
Czechoslovakia ^{[^]}	TCH	•	•	•	•			•	•	•	•	•	•	•	•	•	•	•	•										16
D	Code	24	28	32	36	40	44	48	52	56	60	64	68	72	76	80	84	88	92	94	98	02	06	10	14	18	22	26	Total
Denmark	DEN							•	•		•	•	•					•	•	•	•	•	•	•	•	•	•	•	16
Dominica	DMA																								•				1
E	Code	24	28	32	36	40	44	48	52	56	60	64	68	72	76	80	84	88	92	94	98	02	06	10	14	18	22	26	Total
Ecuador	ECU																									•	•	•	3
Egypt	EGY																•												1
Eritrea	ERI	Ethiopia						Ethiopia																		•	•	•	3
Estonia	EST	^{[A]}	•		•			Soviet Union											•	•	•	•	•	•	•	•	•	•	12
Ethiopia	ETH																						•	•					2
F	Code	24	28	32	36	40	44	48	52	56	60	64	68	72	76	80	84	88	92	94	98	02	06	10	14	18	22	26	Total
Fiji	FIJ																	•		•		•							3
Finland	FIN	•	•	•	•			•	•	•	•	•	•	•	•	•	•	•	•	•	•	•	•	•	•	•	•	•	25
France	FRA	H	•	•	•			•	•	•	•	•	H	•	•	•	•	•	H	•	•	•	•	•	•	•	•	•	25
G	Code	24	28	32	36	40	44	48	52	56	60	64	68	72	76	80	84	88	92	94	98	02	06	10	14	18	22	26	Total
Georgia	GEO	Soviet Union						Soviet Union												•	•	•	•	•	•	•	•	•	9
Germany	GER		•	•	H				•	EUA			GDR, FRG						•	•	•	•	•	•	•	•	•	•	14
United Team of Germany ^{[^]}	EUA									•	•	•																	3
East Germany ^{[^]}	GDR									EUA			•	•	•	•	•	•											6
West Germany ^{[^]}	FRG									EUA			•	•	•	•	•	•											6
Ghana	GHA																							•		•	•		3
Great Britain	GBR	•	•	•	•			•	•	•	•	•	•	•	•	•	•	•	•	•	•	•	•	•	•	•	•	•	25
Greece	GRE				•			•	•	•		•	•	•	•	•	•	•	•	•	•	•	•	•	•	•	•	•	21
Guam	GUM																	•											1
Guatemala	GUA																	•											1
Guinea-Bissau	GBS																											•	1
H	Code	24	28	32	36	40	44	48	52	56	60	64	68	72	76	80	84	88	92	94	98	02	06	10	14	18	22	26	Total
Haiti	HAI																										•	•	2
Honduras	HON																		•										1
Hong Kong	HKG																					•	•	•	•	•	•	•	7
Hungary	HUN	•	•	•	•			•	•	•	•	•	•	•	•	•	•	•	•	•	•	•	•	•	•	•	•	•	25
I	Code	24	28	32	36	40	44	48	52	56	60	64	68	72	76	80	84	88	92	94	98	02	06	10	14	18	22	26	Total
Iceland	ISL							•	•	•	•	•	•		•	•	•	•	•	•	•	•	•	•	•	•	•	•	20
India	IND											•	•					•	•		•	•	•	•	•^{[D]}	•	•	•	12
Iran	IRI									•		•	•	•	•						•	•	•	•	•	•	•	•	13
Ireland	IRL																		•		•	•	•	•	•	•	•	•	9
Israel	ISR																			•	•	•	•	•	•	•	•	•	9
Italy	ITA	•	•	•	•			•	•	H	•	•	•	•	•	•	•	•	•	•	•	•	H	•	•	•	•	H	25
J	Code	24	28	32	36	40	44	48	52	56	60	64	68	72	76	80	84	88	92	94	98	02	06	10	14	18	22	26	Total
Jamaica	JAM																	•	•	•	•	•		•	•	•	•	•	10
Japan	JPN		•	•	•				•	•	•	•	•	H	•	•	•	•	•	•	H	•	•	•	•	•	•	•	23
K	Code	24	28	32	36	40	44	48	52	56	60	64	68	72	76	80	84	88	92	94	98	02	06	10	14	18	22	26	Total
Kazakhstan	KAZ	Soviet Union						Soviet Union											^{EUN}	•	•	•	•	•	•	•	•	•	9
Kenya	KEN																				•	•	•			•		•	5
North Korea	PRK	Japan										•		•			•	•	•		•		•	•		•			9
South Korea	KOR	Japan						•		•	•	•	•	•	•	•	•	•	•	•	•	•	•	•	•	H	•	•	20
Korea ^{[^]}	COR																									•			1
Kosovo	KOS	Yugoslavia						Yugoslavia												SCG				^{SRB}		•	•	•	3
Kyrgyzstan	KGZ	Soviet Union						Soviet Union												•	•	•	•	•	•	•	•	•	9
L	Code	24	28	32	36	40	44	48	52	56	60	64	68	72	76	80	84	88	92	94	98	02	06	10	14	18	22	26	Total
Latvia	LAT	•	•		•			Soviet Union											•	•	•	•	•	•	•	•	•	•	13
Lebanon	LBN							•	•	•	•	•	•	•	•	•	•	•	•			•	•	•	•	•	•	•	19
Liechtenstein	LIE				•			•		•	•	•	•	•	•	•	•	•	•	•	•	•	•	•	•	•	•	•	21
Lithuania	LTU		•					Soviet Union											•	•	•	•	•	•	•	•	•	•	11
Luxembourg	LUX		•		•													•	•	•	•		•		•	•	•	•	11
M	Code	24	28	32	36	40	44	48	52	56	60	64	68	72	76	80	84	88	92	94	98	02	06	10	14	18	22	26	Total
Madagascar	MAD																						•			•	•	•	4
Malaysia	MAS																									•	•	•	3
Malta	MLT																								•	•	•	•	4
Mexico	MEX		•														•	•	•	•		•		•	•	•	•	•	11
Moldova	MDA	Romania						Soviet Union												•	•	•	•	•	•	•	•	•	9
Monaco	MON																•	•	•	•	•	•	•	•	•	•	•	•	12
Mongolia	MGL											•	•	•		•	•	•	•	•	•	•	•	•	•	•	•	•	16
Montenegro	MNE	Yugoslavia						Yugoslavia												SCG				•	•	•	•	•	5
Morocco	MAR												•				•	•	•					•	•	•	•	•	9
N	Code	24	28	32	36	40	44	48	52	56	60	64	68	72	76	80	84	88	92	94	98	02	06	10	14	18	22	26	Total
Nepal	NEP																					•	•	•	•				4
Netherlands	NED		•		•			•	•	•	•	•	•	•	•	•	•	•	•	•	•	•	•	•	•	•	•	•	23
Netherlands Antilles ^{[^]}	AHO																	•	•										2
New Zealand	NZL								•		•		•	•	•	•	•	•	•	•	•	•	•	•	•	•	•	•	18
Nigeria	NGR																									•	•	•	3
North Macedonia	MKD	Yugoslavia						Yugoslavia													•	•	•	•	•	•	•	•	8
Norway	NOR	•	•	•	•			•	H	•	•	•	•	•	•	•	•	•	•	H	•	•	•	•	•	•	•	•	25
P	Code	24	28	32	36	40	44	48	52	56	60	64	68	72	76	80	84	88	92	94	98	02	06	10	14	18	22	26	Total
Pakistan	PAK	India																						•	•	•	•	•	5
Paraguay	PAR																								•				1
Peru	PER																							•	•		•		3
Philippines	PHI													•				•	•						•	•	•	•	7
Poland	POL	•	•	•	•			•	•	•	•	•	•	•	•	•	•	•	•	•	•	•	•	•	•	•	•	•	25
Portugal	POR								•									•		•	•		•	•	•	•	•	•	10
Puerto Rico	PUR																•	•	•	•	•	•				•	•	•	9
R	Code	24	28	32	36	40	44	48	52	56	60	64	68	72	76	80	84	88	92	94	98	02	06	10	14	18	22	26	Total
Romania	ROU		•	•	•			•	•	•		•	•	•	•	•	•	•	•	•	•	•	•	•	•	•	•	•	23
Russia	RUS	Soviet Union						Soviet Union											^{EUN}	•	•	•	•	•	H	^{OAR}	^{ROC}	^{AIN}	6
Soviet Union ^{[^]}	URS									•	•	•	•	•	•	•	•	•	^{EUN}										9
Unified Team ^{[^]}	EUN																		•										1
Olympic Athletes from Russia ^{[^]}	OAR																									•			1
ROC ^{[^]}	ROC																										•		1
Individual Neutral Athletes ^{[^]}	AIN																											•	1
S	Code	24	28	32	36	40	44	48	52	56	60	64	68	72	76	80	84	88	92	94	98	02	06	10	14	18	22	26	Total
San Marino	SMR														•		•	•	•	•		•	•	•	•	•	•	•	12
Saudi Arabia	KSA																										•	•	2
Senegal	SEN																•		•	•			•	•					5
Serbia	SRB	Yugoslavia						Yugoslavia												SCG				•	•	•	•	•	5
Yugoslavia ^{[^]}	YUG	•	•		•			•	•	•		•	•	•	•	•	H	•	•										14
Serbia and Montenegro ^{[^]}	SCG																				•	•	•						3
Singapore	SGP																									•		•	2
Slovakia	SVK	Czechoslovakia						Czechoslovakia												•	•	•	•	•	•	•	•	•	9
Czechoslovakia ^{[^]}	TCH	•	•	•	•			•	•	•	•	•	•	•	•	•	•	•	•										16
Slovenia	SLO	Yugoslavia						Yugoslavia											•	•	•	•	•	•	•	•	•	•	10
South Africa	RSA										•									•	•	•	•	•		•		•	8
Spain	ESP				•			•	•	•	•	•	•	•	•	•	•	•	•	•	•	•	•	•	•	•	•	•	22
Swaziland	SWZ																		•										1
Sweden	SWE	•	•	•	•			•	•	•	•	•	•	•	•	•	•	•	•	•	•	•	•	•	•	•	•	•	25
Switzerland	SUI	•	H	•	•			H	•	•	•	•	•	•	•	•	•	•	•	•	•	•	•	•	•	•	•	•	25
T	Code	24	28	32	36	40	44	48	52	56	60	64	68	72	76	80	84	88	92	94	98	02	06	10	14	18	22	26	Total
Tajikistan	TJK	Soviet Union						Soviet Union														•	•	•	•				4
Thailand	THA																					•	•		•	•	•	•	6
Timor-Leste	TLS																								•	•	•		3
Togo	TOG																								•	•			2
Tonga	TGA																								•	•			2
Trinidad and Tobago	TTO																			•	•	•					•	•	5
Turkey	TUR				•			•		•	•	•	•		•		•	•	•	•	•	•	•	•	•	•	•	•	19
U	Code	24	28	32	36	40	44	48	52	56	60	64	68	72	76	80	84	88	92	94	98	02	06	10	14	18	22	26	Total
Ukraine	UKR	Soviet Union						Soviet Union											^{EUN}	•	•	•	•	•	•	•	•	•	9
United Arab Emirates	UAE																											•	1
United States	USA	•	•	H	•			•	•	•	H	•	•	•	•	H	•	•	•	•	•	H	•	•	•	•	•	•	25
Uruguay	URU																				•							•	2
Uzbekistan	UZB	Soviet Union						Soviet Union											^{EUN}	•	•	•	•	•	•	•	•	•	9
V	Code	24	28	32	36	40	44	48	52	56	60	64	68	72	76	80	84	88	92	94	98	02	06	10	14	18	22	26	Total
Venezuela	VEN																				•	•	•		•			•	5
Virgin Islands	ISV																	•	•	•	•	•	•^{[C]}		•		•		8
Z	Code	24	28	32	36	40	44	48	52	56	60	64	68	72	76	80	84	88	92	94	98	02	06	10	14	18	22	26	Total
Zimbabwe	ZIM																								•				1
Total NOCs number		16	25	17	28	-	-	28	30	32	30	36	37	35	37	37	49	57	64	67	72	78	80	82	88	93	91	93	1240

=== First Appearance lists ===
Contents:	Early Games | Post-war | 70s & 80s | 90s & 2000s | Recent Games

Early Games
NOC	Code	24	28	32	36	40	44	48	52	56	60	64	68	72	76	80	84	88	92	94	98	02	06	10	14	18	22	26	Total
France	FRA	H	•	•	•			•	•	•	•	•	H	•	•	•	•	•	H	•	•	•	•	•	•	•	•	•	25
Austria	AUT	•	•	•	•			•	•	•	•	H	•	•	H	•	•	•	•	•	•	•	•	•	•	•	•	•	25
Canada	CAN	•	•	•	•			•	•	•	•	•	•	•	•	•	•	H	•	•	•	•	•	H	•	•	•	•	25
Finland	FIN	•	•	•	•			•	•	•	•	•	•	•	•	•	•	•	•	•	•	•	•	•	•	•	•	•	25
Great Britain	GBR	•	•	•	•			•	•	•	•	•	•	•	•	•	•	•	•	•	•	•	•	•	•	•	•	•	25
Hungary	HUN	•	•	•	•			•	•	•	•	•	•	•	•	•	•	•	•	•	•	•	•	•	•	•	•	•	25
Italy	ITA	•	•	•	•			•	•	H	•	•	•	•	•	•	•	•	•	•	•	•	H	•	•	•	•	H	25
Norway	NOR	•	•	•	•			•	H	•	•	•	•	•	•	•	•	•	•	H	•	•	•	•	•	•	•	•	25
Poland	POL	•	•	•	•			•	•	•	•	•	•	•	•	•	•	•	•	•	•	•	•	•	•	•	•	•	25
Sweden	SWE	•	•	•	•			•	•	•	•	•	•	•	•	•	•	•	•	•	•	•	•	•	•	•	•	•	25
Switzerland	SUI	•	H	•	•			H	•	•	•	•	•	•	•	•	•	•	•	•	•	•	•	•	•	•	•	•	25
United States	USA	•	•	H	•			•	•	•	H	•	•	•	•	H	•	•	•	•	•	H	•	•	•	•	•	•	25
Belgium	BEL	•	•	•	•			•	•	•		•		•	•	•	•	•	•	•	•	•	•	•	•	•	•	•	23
Czechoslovakia ^{[^]}	TCH	•	•	•	•			•	•	•	•	•	•	•	•	•	•	•	•										16
Yugoslavia ^{[^]}	YUG	•	•		•			•	•	•		•	•	•	•	•	H	•	•										14
Latvia	LAT	•	•		•			Soviet Union											•	•	•	•	•	•	•	•	•	•	13
NOC	Code	24	28	32	36	40	44	48	52	56	60	64	68	72	76	80	84	88	92	94	98	02	06	10	14	18	22	26	Total
Romania	ROU		•	•	•			•	•	•		•	•	•	•	•	•	•	•	•	•	•	•	•	•	•	•	•	23
Japan	JPN		•	•	•				•	•	•	•	•	H	•	•	•	•	•	•	H	•	•	•	•	•	•	•	23
Netherlands	NED		•		•			•	•	•	•	•	•	•	•	•	•	•	•	•	•	•	•	•	•	•	•	•	23
Argentina	ARG		•					•	•		•	•	•	•	•	•	•	•	•	•	•	•	•	•	•	•	•	•	21
Germany	GER		•	•	H				•	EUA			GDR, FRG						•	•	•	•	•	•	•	•	•	•	14
Estonia	EST	^{[A]}	•		•			Soviet Union											•	•	•	•	•	•	•	•	•	•	12
Luxembourg	LUX		•		•													•	•	•	•		•		•	•	•	•	11
Mexico	MEX		•														•	•	•	•		•		•	•	•	•	•	11
Lithuania	LTU		•					Soviet Union											•	•	•	•	•	•	•	•	•	•	11
NOC	Code	24	28	32	36	40	44	48	52	56	60	64	68	72	76	80	84	88	92	94	98	02	06	10	14	18	22	26	Total
Bulgaria	BUL				•			•	•	•	•	•	•	•	•	•	•	•	•	•	•	•	•	•	•	•	•	•	22
Spain	ESP				•			•	•	•	•	•	•	•	•	•	•	•	•	•	•	•	•	•	•	•	•	•	22
Greece	GRE				•			•	•	•		•	•	•	•	•	•	•	•	•	•	•	•	•	•	•	•	•	21
Liechtenstein	LIE				•			•		•	•	•	•	•	•	•	•	•	•	•	•	•	•	•	•	•	•	•	21
Australia	AUS				•				•	•	•	•	•	•	•	•	•	•	•	•	•	•	•	•	•	•	•	•	21
Turkey	TUR				•			•		•	•	•	•		•		•	•	•	•	•	•	•	•	•	•	•	•	19
Total NOCs number		16	25	17	28	-	-	23	24	24	21	25	24	24	25	24	26	27	31	29	28	28	28	28	29	29	29	29	641

Post-war
NOC	Code	48	52	56	60	64	68	72	76	80	84	88	92	94	98	02	06	10	14	18	22	26	Total
Iceland	ISL	•	•	•	•	•	•		•	•	•	•	•	•	•	•	•	•	•	•	•	•	20
South Korea	KOR	•		•	•	•	•	•	•	•	•	•	•	•	•	•	•	•	•	H	•	•	20
Lebanon	LBN	•	•	•	•	•	•	•	•	•	•	•	•			•	•	•	•	•	•	•	19
Chile	CHI	•	•	•	•	•	•		•		•	•	•	•	•	•	•	•	•	•	•	•	19
Denmark	DEN	•	•		•	•	•					•	•	•	•	•	•	•	•	•	•	•	16
NOC	Code	48	52	56	60	64	68	72	76	80	84	88	92	94	98	02	06	10	14	18	22	26	Total
New Zealand	NZL		•		•		•	•	•	•	•	•	•	•	•	•	•	•	•	•	•	•	18
Portugal	POR		•									•		•	•		•	•	•	•	•	•	10
NOC	Code	48	52	56	60	64	68	72	76	80	84	88	92	94	98	02	06	10	14	18	22	26	Total
Iran	IRI			•		•	•	•	•						•	•	•	•	•	•	•	•	13
Soviet Union ^{[^]}	URS			•	•	•	•	•	•	•	•	•	^{EUN}										9
Bolivia	BOL			•						•	•	•	•							•	•	•	8
United Team of Germany ^{[^]}	EUA			•	•	•																	3
NOC	Code	48	52	56	60	64	68	72	76	80	84	88	92	94	98	02	06	10	14	18	22	26	Total
South Africa	RSA				•									•	•	•	•	•		•		•	8
NOC	Code	48	52	56	60	64	68	72	76	80	84	88	92	94	98	02	06	10	14	18	22	26	Total
Mongolia	MGL					•	•	•		•	•	•	•	•	•	•	•	•	•	•	•	•	16
India	IND					•	•					•	•		•	•	•	•	•^{[D]}	•	•	•	12
North Korea	PRK					•		•			•	•	•		•		•	•		•			9
NOC	Code	48	52	56	60	64	68	72	76	80	84	88	92	94	98	02	06	10	14	18	22	26	Total
Morocco	MAR						•				•	•	•					•	•	•	•	•	9
East Germany ^{[^]}	GDR			EUA			•	•	•	•	•	•											6
West Germany ^{[^]}	FRG			EUA			•	•	•	•	•	•											6
Total NOCs number		5	6	8	9	11	13	9	9	9	12	15	11	8	11	10	12	13	11	14	12	13	221

70s & 80s
NOC	Code	72	76	80	84	88	92	94	98	02	06	10	14	18	22	26	Total
Chinese Taipei (Taiwan)	TPE	•	•		•	•	•	•	•	•	•	•	•	•	•	•	14
Philippines	PHI	•				•	•						•	•	•	•	7
NOC	Code	72	76	80	84	88	92	94	98	02	06	10	14	18	22	26	Total
Andorra	AND		•	•	•	•	•	•	•	•	•	•	•	•	•	•	14
San Marino	SMR		•		•	•	•	•		•	•	•	•	•	•	•	12
NOC	Code	72	76	80	84	88	92	94	98	02	06	10	14	18	22	26	Total
China	CHN			•	•	•	•	•	•	•	•	•	•	•	H	•	13
Cyprus	CYP			•	•	•	•	•	•	•	•	•	•	•	•	•	13
Costa Rica	CRC			•	•	•	•			•^{[B]}	•						6
NOC	Code	72	76	80	84	88	92	94	98	02	06	10	14	18	22	26	Total
Puerto Rico	PUR				•	•	•	•	•	•				•	•	•	9
Senegal	SEN				•		•	•			•	•					5
British Virgin Islands	IVB				•								•				2
Egypt	EGY				•												1
NOC	Code	72	76	80	84	88	92	94	98	02	06	10	14	18	22	26	Total
Jamaica	JAM					•	•	•	•	•		•	•	•	•	•	10
Virgin Islands	ISV					•	•	•	•	•	•^{[C]}		•		•		8
Fiji	FIJ					•		•		•							3
Netherlands Antilles ^{[^]}	AHO					•	•										2
Guam	GUM					•											1
Guatemala	GUA					•											1
Total NOCs number		2	3	4	10	14	12	10	7	10	8	7	9	8	9	8	121

90s & 2000s
NOC	Code	92	94	98	02	06	10	14	18	22	26	Total
Brazil	BRA	•	•	•	•	•	•	•	•	•	•	10
Croatia	CRO	•	•	•	•	•	•	•	•	•	•	10
Slovenia	SLO	•	•	•	•	•	•	•	•	•	•	10
Ireland	IRL	•		•	•	•	•	•	•	•	•	9
Bermuda	BER	•	•	•	•	•	•	•	•			8
Algeria	ALG	•				•	•					3
Honduras	HON	•										1
Swaziland	SWZ	•										1
Unified Team ^{[^]}	EUN	•										1
NOC	Code	92	94	98	02	06	10	14	18	22	26	Total
Armenia	ARM		•	•	•	•	•	•	•	•	•	9
Bosnia and Herzegovina	BIH	^{YUG}	•	•	•	•	•	•	•	•	•	9
Czech Republic	CZE	^{TCH}	•	•	•	•	•	•	•	•	•	9
Georgia	GEO		•	•	•	•	•	•	•	•	•	9
Israel	ISR		•	•	•	•	•	•	•	•	•	9
Kazakhstan	KAZ	^{EUN}	•	•	•	•	•	•	•	•	•	9
Kyrgyzstan	KGZ		•	•	•	•	•	•	•	•	•	9
Moldova	MDA		•	•	•	•	•	•	•	•	•	9
Slovakia	SVK	^{TCH}	•	•	•	•	•	•	•	•	•	9
Ukraine	UKR	^{EUN}	•	•	•	•	•	•	•	•	•	9
Uzbekistan	UZB	^{EUN}	•	•	•	•	•	•	•	•	•	9
Belarus	BLR	^{EUN}	•	•	•	•	•	•	•	•	^{AIN}	8
Russia	RUS	^{EUN}	•	•	•	•	•	H	^{OAR}	^{ROC}	^{AIN}	6
Trinidad and Tobago	TTO		•	•	•					•	•	5
American Samoa	ASA		•							•		2
NOC	Code	92	94	98	02	06	10	14	18	22	26	Total
Azerbaijan	AZE			•	•	•	•	•	•	•	•	8
North Macedonia	MKD	^{YUG}		•	•	•	•	•	•	•	•	8
Kenya	KEN			•	•	•			•		•	5
Venezuela	VEN			•	•	•		•			•	5
Serbia and Montenegro ^{[^]}	SCG			•	•	•						3
Uruguay	URU			•							•	2
NOC	Code	92	94	98	02	06	10	14	18	22	26	Total
Hong Kong	HKG				•	•	•	•	•	•	•	7
Thailand	THA				•	•		•	•	•	•	6
Nepal	NEP				•	•	•	•				4
Tajikistan	TJK				•	•	•	•				4
Cameroon	CMR				•							1
NOC	Code	92	94	98	02	06	10	14	18	22	26	Total
Albania	ALB					•	•	•	•	•	•	6
Madagascar	MAD					•			•	•	•	4
Ethiopia	ETH					•	•					2
Total NOCs number		9	19	25	29	31	26	26	24	24	25	238

Recent Games
NOC	Code	10	14	18	22	26	Total
Montenegro	MNE	•	•	•	•	•	5
Pakistan	PAK	•	•	•	•	•	5
Serbia	SRB	•	•	•	•	•	5
Colombia	COL	•		•	•	•	4
Peru	PER	•	•		•		3
Ghana	GHA	•		•	•		3
Cayman Islands	CAY	•	•				2
NOC	Code	10	14	18	22	26	Total
Malta	MLT		•	•	•	•	4
Timor-Leste	TLS		•	•	•		3
Togo	TOG		•	•			2
Tonga	TGA		•	•			2
Dominica	DMA		•				1
Paraguay	PAR		•				1
Zimbabwe	ZIM		•				1
NOC	Code	10	14	18	22	26	Total
Ecuador	ECU			•	•	•	3
Eritrea	ERI			•	•	•	3
Kosovo	KOS	^{SRB}		•	•	•	3
Malaysia	MAS			•	•	•	3
Nigeria	NGR			•	•	•	3
Singapore	SGP			•		•	2
Korea ^{[^]}	COR			•			1
Olympic Athletes from Russia ^{[^]}	OAR			•			1
NOC	Code	10	14	18	22	26	Total
Haiti	HAI				•	•	2
Saudi Arabia	KSA				•	•	2
ROC ^{[^]}	ROC				•		1
NOC	Code	10	14	18	22	26	Total
Benin	BEN					•	1
Guinea-Bissau	GBS					•	1
United Arab Emirates	UAE					•	1
Individual Neutral Athletes ^{[^]}	AIN					•	1
Total NOCs number		7	12	17	16	17	69

=== Nations that have never competed ===
85 of the 206 active NOCs have yet to compete in a Winter Olympics.

Vatican City is not a member of the International Olympic Committee and is therefore not able to send a team to the Olympic Games.

- Note: The Refugee Olympic Team was founded in 2016 and has competed in the Summer Olympics, but has not in the Winter Olympics.

Nation	Code
Afghanistan	AFG
Angola	ANG
Antigua and Barbuda	ANT
Aruba	ARU
Bahamas	BAH
Bahrain	BRN
Bangladesh	BAN
Barbados	BAR
Belize	BIZ
Bhutan	BHU
Botswana	BOT
Brunei	BRU
Burkina Faso	BUR
Burundi	BDI
Cambodia	CAM
Cape Verde	CPV
Central African Republic	CAF
Chad	CHA
Comoros	COM
Republic of the Congo	CGO
Cook Islands	COK
Cuba	CUB
Djibouti	DJI
Dominican Republic	DOM
Democratic Republic of the Congo	COD
El Salvador	ESA
Equatorial Guinea	GEQ
Federated States of Micronesia	FSM
Gabon	GAB
The Gambia	GAM
Grenada	GRN
Guinea	GUI
Guyana	GUY
Indonesia	INA
Iraq	IRQ
Ivory Coast	CIV
Jordan	JOR
Kiribati	KIR
Kuwait	KUW
Laos	LAO
Lesotho	LES
Liberia	LBR
Libya	LBA
Malawi	MAW
Maldives	MDV
Mali	MLI
Marshall Islands	MHL
Mauritania	MTN
Mauritius	MRI
Mozambique	MOZ
Myanmar	MYA
Namibia	NAM
Nauru	NRU
Nicaragua	NCA
Niger	NIG
Oman	OMA
Palau	PLW
Palestine	PLE
Panama	PAN
Papua New Guinea	PNG
Qatar	QAT
Rwanda	RWA
Saint Kitts and Nevis	SKN
Saint Lucia	LCA
Saint Vincent and the Grenadines	VIN
Samoa	SAM
São Tomé and Príncipe	STP
Seychelles	SEY
Sierra Leone	SLE
Solomon Islands	SOL
Somalia	SOM
South Sudan	SSD
Sri Lanka	SRI
Sudan	SUD
Suriname	SUR
Syria	SYR
Tanzania	TAN
Tunisia	TUN
Turkmenistan	TKM
Tuvalu	TUV
Uganda	UGA
Vanuatu	VAN
Vietnam	VIE
Yemen	YEM
Zambia	ZAM
Refugee Olympic Team*	EOR*

== Notes ==
=== Name changes notes ===
TPE: The Chinese Taipei was designated Republic of China (ROC) in 1972 and 1976. In 1979, the IOC started to use Chinese Taipei to refer to this NOC, a compromise that was acceptable for the People's Republic of China to start participating in the Olympic Games.
MKD: North Macedonia was known as Macedonia, or more formally Former Yugoslav Republic of Macedonia due to a naming dispute with Greece, between 1998 and 2018.
SCG: The Federal Republic of Yugoslavia, consisting of the Republic of Serbia and the Republic of Montenegro, participated at the Games since 1998. It was reconstituted as the State Union of Serbia and Montenegro in 2003. At the 1998 and 2002 Games, the nation was still designated Yugoslavia (YUG). The Serbia and Montenegro (SCG) designation and code were used at the Winter Games in 2006.

=== Participation notes ===
1. A single speed skater from Estonia registered for the 1924 Winter Olympics and carried the flag in the opening ceremonies, but did not compete.
2. Costa Rica did not take part in the Opening Ceremony of the 2002 Winter Olympics, but its athletes did compete; 78 nations participated in the 2002 Games, however the IOC web site states that 77 nations participated, probably erroneously not counting Costa Rica.
3. Anne Abernathy was the lone competitor from the Virgin Islands at the 2006 Winter Olympics, but withdrew from the women's luge event after injuring herself during a practice run.
4. India's athletes originally competed as Independent Olympic Participants and marched under the Olympic Flag during the opening ceremony due to the Indian Olympic Association's suspension. On 11 February, the Indian Olympic Association was reinstated and India's athletes were allowed the option to compete under their own flag from that time onward.

== See also ==
- Tropical nations at the Winter Olympics
- List of participating nations at the Summer Olympic Games
- List of participating nations at the Winter Paralympic Games
- List of IOC country codes
- Lists of National Olympic Committees by continental association:
  - Association of National Olympic Committees of Africa
  - European Olympic Committees
  - Oceania National Olympic Committees
  - Olympic Council of Asia
  - Pan American Sports Organization
