= Guinea at the 1968 Summer Olympics =

- IOC code: GUI
- NOC: Comité National Olympique et Sportif Guinéen

in Mexico City
- Competitors: 15 in 1 sport
- Flag bearer: Morciré Sylla
- Medals: Gold 0 Silver 0 Bronze 0 Total 0

Summer Olympics appearances (overview)
- 1968; 1972–1976; 1980; 1984; 1988; 1992; 1996; 2000; 2004; 2008; 2012; 2016; 2020; 2024

Guinea competed in the Olympic Games for the first time at the 1968 Summer Olympics in Mexico City, Mexico.

Guinea sent only a football team.

== Football ==
=== Group A ===
Pos	Team	Pld	W	D	L	GF	GA	GD	Pts	Qualification
1	France	3	2	0	1	8	4	+4	4	Advance to knockout stage
2	Mexico (H)	3	2	0	1	6	4	+2	4	Advance to knockout stage
3	Colombia	3	1	0	2	4	5	−1	2	
4	Guinea	3	1	0	2	4	9	−5	2	

Source: FIFA
(H) Hosts
13 October 1968
12:00

France	3–1	Guinea
Hallet 61'; Horlaville 64'; Perrigaud 70'	Report	Maxim 79'

Estadio Cuauhtémoc, Puebla
Referee: Milivoje Gugulovic (Socialist Federal Republic of Yugoslavia)

15 October 1968
12:00

Guinea	3–2	Colombia
Ndongo 26'; Bouya 58', 84'	Report	Santa 49'; Mosquera 66'

Estadio Cuauhtémoc, Puebla
Referee: Dimitar Rumenchev (Bulgaria)

17 October 1968
12:00

Mexico	4–0	Guinea
Pereda 70', 85'; Pulido Rodríguez 86', 88'	Report

Azteca Stadium, Mexico City
Referee: Suvaree Wanchai (Thailand)
