= Guinea at the 2020 Summer Paralympics =

- Flag of Guinea
- IPC code: GUI
- NPC: National Paralympic Committee Guinea

in Tokyo, Japan August 24, 2021 – September 5, 2021
- Competitors: 2 (1 man and 1 woman) in 1 sport
- Medals: Gold 0 Silver 0 Bronze 0 Total 0

Summer Paralympics appearances (overview)
- 2004; 2008; 2012; 2016; 2020; 2024

Guinea competed at the 2020 Summer Paralympics in Tokyo, Japan, from 24 August to 5 September 2021. This was their second consecutive appearance at the Summer Paralympics since 2016 and their fourth overall.

== Competitors ==
The following is the list of number of competitors participating in the Games:

Sport	Men	Women	Total
Athletics	1	1	2

== Athletics ==
Men's track

Athlete	Event	Heats		Final	
Athlete	Event	Result	Rank	Result	Rank
Bacou Dambakaté	100 metres T13	12.24	5	Did not advance	

Women's field

Athlete	Event	Heats		Final	
Athlete	Event	Result	Rank	Result	Rank
Kadiatou Bangoura	200 metres T47	28.25 =PB	6	Did not advance	
Kadiatou Bangoura	400 metres T47	1:02.75 PB	5	Did not advance	

== See also ==
- Guinea at the Paralympics
- Guinea at the 2020 Summer Olympics
