= Guinea at the 2004 Summer Paralympics =

- IPC code: GUI
- NPC: Guinea Paralympic Committee

in Athens
- Competitors: 1 in 1 sport
- Medals: Gold 0 Silver 0 Bronze 0 Total 0

Summer Paralympics appearances (overview)
- 2004; 2008; 2012; 2016; 2020; 2024

Guinea made its Paralympic Games début at the 2004 Summer Paralympics in Athens. They sent one athlete who did not medal.

== Team ==
Guinea participated in their first Paralympic Games in their history in Athens. The country sent a single athlete, Ahmed Barry, to compete in athletics. He did not win a medal.

== Results ==
Name	Sport	Event	Time	Rank
Ahmed Barry	Athletics	Men's 100 m T46	13.00	7th in heat 2; did not advance
Ahmed Barry	Athletics	Men's 200 m T46	25.87	8th in heat 1; did not advance

== See also ==
- Guinea at the Paralympics
- Guinea at the 2004 Summer Olympics
