= Guinea at the 1992 Summer Olympics =

- IOC code: GUI
- NOC: Comité National Olympique et Sportif Guinéen

in Barcelona
- Competitors: 8 in 2 sports
- Medals: Gold 0 Silver 0 Bronze 0 Total 0

Summer Olympics appearances (overview)
- 1968; 1972–1976; 1980; 1984; 1988; 1992; 1996; 2000; 2004; 2008; 2012; 2016; 2020; 2024

Guinea competed at the 1992 Summer Olympics in Barcelona, Spain.

== Competitors ==
The following is the list of number of competitors in the Games.

Sport	Men	Women	Total
Athletics	3	2	5
Judo	3	0	3
Total	6	2	8

== Athletics ==
Men
Track and road events

Athlete	Event	Heats		Quarterfinal		Semifinal		Final	
Athlete	Event	Result	Rank	Result	Rank	Result	Rank	Result	Rank
Soryba Diakité	100 metres	11.10	63	Did not advance					
Amadou Sy Savané	200 metres	21.86	55	Did not advance					
Mohamed Sy Savané	800 metres	1:51.80	44	—		Did not advance			
Mohamed Sy Savané	1500 metres	3:51.96	39	—		Did not advance			
Amadou Sy Savané	400 metres hurdles	54.26	41	—		Did not advance			

Field events

Athlete	Event	Qualification		Final	
Athlete	Event	Distance	Position	Distance	Position
Soryba Diakité	Long jump	NM		Did not advance	

Women
Track and road events

Athlete	Event	Heats		Quarterfinal		Semifinal		Final	
Athlete	Event	Result	Rank	Result	Rank	Result	Rank	Result	Rank
Aminata Konaté	100 metres	12.33	47	Did not advance					
Oumou Sow	200 metres	DNF		Did not advance					

== Judo ==
Men

Athlete	Event	Round of 64	Round of 32	Round of 16	Quarterfinals	Semifinals	Repechage			Final	
Athlete	Event	Round of 64	Round of 32	Round of 16	Quarterfinals	Semifinals	Round 1	Round 2	Round 3	Final	
Athlete	Event	Opposition Result	Opposition Result	Opposition Result	Opposition Result	Opposition Result	Opposition Result	Opposition Result	Opposition Result	Opposition Result	Rank
Mamadou Bah	60 kg	Bye	Huseynov (EUN); L	Did not advance			Rusev (BUL); L	Did not advance			
Sekou Camara	78 kg	Matangi (ZIM); L	Did not advance								
Mohamed Doukouré	95 kg	Bye	Sosna (TCH); L	Did not advance							
