= Guinea at the 2016 Summer Olympics =

- IOC code: GUI
- NOC: Comité National Olympique et Sportif Guinéen

in Rio de Janeiro
- Competitors: 5 in 3 sports
- Flag bearer: Mamadama Bangoura
- Medals: Gold 0 Silver 0 Bronze 0 Total 0

Summer Olympics appearances (overview)
- 1968; 1972–1976; 1980; 1984; 1988; 1992; 1996; 2000; 2004; 2008; 2012; 2016; 2020; 2024

Guinea competed at the 2016 Summer Olympics in Rio de Janeiro, Brazil, from 5 to 21 August 2016. This was the nation's eleventh appearance at the Summer Olympics since its debut in 1968. Guinea failed to register any athletes at the 1972 Summer Olympics in Munich, and eventually joined the rest of the African nations to boycott the 1976 Summer Olympics in Montreal.

Five Guinean athletes, two men and three women, were selected to the team, competing only in athletics, judo, and swimming; all of them received their spots through wild card entries. Half-middleweight judoka Mamadama Bangoura led the Guinean squad as the nation's flag bearer in the opening ceremony. Guinea, however, has yet to win its first ever Olympic medal.

== Athletics ==
Guinea has received universality slots from IAAF to send two athletes (one male and one female) to the Olympics.

Key

- Note–Ranks given for track events are within the athlete's heat only
- Q = Qualified for the next round
- q = Qualified for the next round as a fastest loser or, in field events, by position without achieving the qualifying target
- NR = National record
- N/A = Round not applicable for the event
- Bye = Athlete not required to compete in round

Track & road events

Athlete	Event	Heat		Quarterfinal		Semifinal		Final	
Athlete	Event	Time	Rank	Time	Rank	Time	Rank	Time	Rank
Mohamed Lamine Dansoko	Men's 100 m	11.05	6	did not advance					
Makoura Keita	Women's 100 m	12.66	4	did not advance					

== Judo ==
Guinea has received an invitation from the Tripartite Commission to send a judoka competing in the women's half-middleweight category (63 kg) to the Olympics.

Athlete	Event	Round of 32	Round of 16	Quarterfinals	Semifinals	Repechage	Final / BM	
Athlete	Event	Opposition Result	Opposition Result	Opposition Result	Opposition Result	Opposition Result	Opposition Result	Rank
Mamadama Bangoura	Women's −63 kg	García (ECU); L 000–100	did not advance					

== Swimming ==
Guinea has received a Universality invitation from FINA to send two swimmers (one male and one female) to the Olympics.

Athlete	Event	Heat		Semifinal		Final	
Athlete	Event	Time	Rank	Time	Rank	Time	Rank
Amadou Camara	Men's 50 m freestyle	27.35	78	did not advance			
Mariama Sow	Women's 50 m freestyle	39.85	87	did not advance			
