= Paul Haba =

Guinean sprinter (born 1959)

Personal information
- Nationality: Guinean
- Born: 14 July 1959 (age 67)
- Height: 177 cm (5 ft 10 in)
- Weight: 68 kg (150 lb)

Sport
- Sport: Sprinting
- Event: 100 metres

Paul Haba (born 14 July 1959) is a Guinean sprinter. Haba would compete at the 1980 Summer Olympics, representing Guinea in two sprinting events. There, he would compete in the men's 100 metres and men's 200 metres.

His first event would be the former, where he would place sixth out of seven competitors in his heat; he would not advance. Three days later, he would compete in the latter against six other competitors. There, he would place last and again would not advance.

== Biography ==
Paul Haba was born on 14 July 1959.

Haba would compete for Guinea at the 1980 Summer Olympics in Moscow in what was then the Soviet Union. His first competition at the games would be in the heats of the men's 100 metres on 24 July against six other competitors. There, he would place sixth in his round with a time of 11.19 seconds and would not advance to the quarterfinals. The eventual winner of the event would be Allan Wells of Great Britain with a time of 10.25 seconds in the finals.

Three days later on 27 July, he would compete in the heats of the men's 200 metres against six other competitors. There, he would place last in his round with a time of 22.70 and would not advance to the quarterfinals. The eventual winner of the event would be Pietro Mennea of Italy with a time of 20.19 seconds in the finals.

Later on in his athletics career, Haba would set new personal bests in the 100 metres and 200 metres. He would record a time of 10.90 seconds in the former in 1984 while he would record a time of 22.00 seconds in the latter the following year.
