= List of participating nations at the Winter Paralympic Games =

This is a list of nations, as represented by National Paralympic Committees (NPCs), that have participated in the Winter Paralympic Games between 1976 and 2026. The Winter Paralympic Games have been held every four years (once during each Paralympiad) since 1976, and in 1994 when the Winter Games were moved to the middle of the Paralympiad, two years after the previous Games. 66 NPCs (61 of the current 174 NPCs and 5 obsolete NPCs) have participated in at least one Winter Games, and eight nations (Austria, Canada, Finland, France, Great Britain, Norway, Sweden and Switzerland) have participated in all eleven Winter Games to date. Including continuity from Czechoslovakia, the Czech Republic and Slovakia have also been represented in every edition.

== Table legend ==
| 76 | In the table headings, indicates the Games year |
| • | Participated in the specified Games |
| H | Host nation for the specified Games |
| | NPC superseded or preceded by other NPC(s) during these years |

== Alphabetical list ==
| A | Code | 76 | 80 | 84 | 88 | 92 | 94 | 98 | 02 | 06 | 10 | 14 | 18 | 22 | 26 |
|---|---|---|---|---|---|---|---|---|---|---|---|---|---|---|---|
| Andorra | AND | | | | | | | | • | • | • | • | • | • | • |
| Argentina | ARG | | | | | | | | | | • | • | • | • | • |
| Armenia | ARM | Soviet Union | | | | ^{EUN} | | • | • | • | • | • | • | • | • |
| Australia | AUS | | • | • | • | • | • | • | • | • | • | • | • | • | • |
| Austria | AUT | • | • | H | H | • | • | • | • | • | • | • | • | • | • |
| Azerbaijan | AZE | Soviet Union | | | | ^{EUN} | | | | | | | | • | |
| B | Code | 76 | 80 | 84 | 88 | 92 | 94 | 98 | 02 | 06 | 10 | 14 | 18 | 22 | 26 |
| Belarus | BLR | Soviet Union | | | | ^{EUN} | • | • | • | • | • | • | • | | • |
| Belgium | BEL | • | | • | • | • | • | | | • | • | • | • | • | • |
| Bosnia and Herzegovina | BIH | Yugoslavia | | | | | | | | | • | • | • | • | • |
| Brazil | BRA | | | | | | | | | | | • | • | • | • |
| Bulgaria | BUL | | | | | | • | • | • | • | • | • | • | • | • |
| C | Code | 76 | 80 | 84 | 88 | 92 | 94 | 98 | 02 | 06 | 10 | 14 | 18 | 22 | 26 |
| Canada | CAN | • | • | • | • | • | • | • | • | • | H | • | • | • | • |
| Chile | CHI | | | | | | | | • | • | • | • | • | • | • |
| China | CHN | | | | | | | | • | • | • | • | • | H | • |
| Croatia | CRO | Yugoslavia | | | | | | | • | • | • | • | • | • | • |
| Czech Republic | CZE | Czechoslovakia | | | | | • | • | • | • | • | • | • | • | • |
| Czechoslovakia | TCH | • | • | • | • | • | | | | | | | | | |
| D | Code | 76 | 80 | 84 | 88 | 92 | 94 | 98 | 02 | 06 | 10 | 14 | 18 | 22 | 26 |
| Denmark | DEN | | • | • | • | • | • | • | • | • | • | • | • | • | • |
| E | Code | 76 | 80 | 84 | 88 | 92 | 94 | 98 | 02 | 06 | 10 | 14 | 18 | 22 | 26 |
| Estonia | EST | Soviet Union | | | | • | • | • | • | | | | | • | • |
| El Salvador | ESA | | | | | | | | | | | | | | • |
| F | Code | 76 | 80 | 84 | 88 | 92 | 94 | 98 | 02 | 06 | 10 | 14 | 18 | 22 | 26 |
| Finland | FIN | • | • | • | • | • | • | • | • | • | • | • | • | • | • |
| France | FRA | • | • | • | • | H | • | • | • | • | • | • | • | • | • |
| G | Code | 76 | 80 | 84 | 88 | 92 | 94 | 98 | 02 | 06 | 10 | 14 | 18 | 22 | 26 |
| Georgia | GEO | Soviet Union | | | | ^{EUN} | | | | | | | • | • | • |
| Germany | GER | | | | | • | • | • | • | • | • | • | • | • | • |
| West Germany | FRG | • | • | • | • | | | | | | | | | | |
| Great Britain | GBR | • | • | • | • | • | • | • | • | • | • | • | • | • | • |
| Greece | GRE | | | | | | | | • | • | • | • | • | • | • |
| H | Code | 76 | 80 | 84 | 88 | 92 | 94 | 98 | 02 | 06 | 10 | 14 | 18 | 22 | 26 |
| Haiti | HAI | | | | | | | | | | | | | | • |
| Hungary | HUN | | | | | | | | • | • | • | | • | • | |
| I | Code | 76 | 80 | 84 | 88 | 92 | 94 | 98 | 02 | 06 | 10 | 14 | 18 | 22 | 26 |
| Iceland | ISL | | | | | | • | | | | • | • | • | • | • |
| Iran | IRI | | | | | | | • | • | • | • | • | • | • | |
| Israel | ISR | | | | | | | | | | | | | • | • |
| Italy | ITA | | • | • | • | • | • | • | • | H | • | • | • | • | H |
| J | Code | 76 | 80 | 84 | 88 | 92 | 94 | 98 | 02 | 06 | 10 | 14 | 18 | 22 | 26 |
| Japan | JPN | • | • | • | • | • | • | H | • | • | • | • | • | • | • |
| K | Code | 76 | 80 | 84 | 88 | 92 | 94 | 98 | 02 | 06 | 10 | 14 | 18 | 22 | 26 |
| Kazakhstan | KAZ | Soviet Union | | | | ^{EUN} | • | • | • | • | • | • | • | • | • |
| L | Code | 76 | 80 | 84 | 88 | 92 | 94 | 98 | 02 | 06 | 10 | 14 | 18 | 22 | 26 |
| Latvia | LAT | Soviet Union | | | | | • | | | • | | | | • | • |
| Liechtenstein | LIE | | | | | • | • | | | | | | | • | • |
| Lithuania | LTU | Soviet Union | | | | | • | | | | | | | | • |
| M | Code | 76 | 80 | 84 | 88 | 92 | 94 | 98 | 02 | 06 | 10 | 14 | 18 | 22 | 26 |
| Mexico | MEX | | | | | | | | | • | • | • | • | • | • |
| Mongolia | MGL | | | | | | | | | • | • | • | • | • | • |
| Montenegro | MNE | Yugoslavia | | | | | | | | | | | | | • |
| N | Code | 76 | 80 | 84 | 88 | 92 | 94 | 98 | 02 | 06 | 10 | 14 | 18 | 22 | 26 |
| Netherlands | NED | | | • | • | • | • | • | • | • | • | • | • | • | • |
| New Zealand | NZL | | • | • | • | • | • | • | • | • | • | • | • | • | • |
| North Korea | PRK | | | | | | | | | | | | • | | |
| North Macedonia | MKD | Yugoslavia | | | | | | | | | | | | | • |
| Norway | NOR | • | H | • | • | • | H | • | • | • | • | • | • | • | • |
| P | Code | 76 | 80 | 84 | 88 | 92 | 94 | 98 | 02 | 06 | 10 | 14 | 18 | 22 | 26 |
| Poland | POL | • | | • | • | • | • | • | • | • | • | • | • | • | • |
| Portugal | POR | | | | | | | | | | | | | | • |
| Puerto Rico | PUR | | | | | | | | | | | | | • | • |
| R | Code | 76 | 80 | 84 | 88 | 92 | 94 | 98 | 02 | 06 | 10 | 14 | 18 | 22 | 26 |
| Romania | ROU | | | | | | | | | | • | • | • | • | • |
| Russia | RUS | Soviet Union | | | | ^{EUN} | • | • | • | • | • | H | ^{NPA} | | • |
| Unified Team | EUN | | | | | • | | | | | | | | | |
| Soviet Union | URS | | | | • | ^{EUN} | | | | | | | | | |
| Neutral Paralympic Athletes | NPA | | | | | | | | | | | | • | | |
| S | Code | 76 | 80 | 84 | 88 | 92 | 94 | 98 | 02 | 06 | 10 | 14 | 18 | 22 | 26 |
| Serbia | SRB | Yugoslavia | | | | | | | | | • | • | • | | • |
| Yugoslavia | YUG | • | • | • | • | | | | | | | | | | |
| Slovakia | SVK | Czechoslovakia | | | | | • | • | • | • | • | • | • | • | • |
| Slovenia | SLO | Yugoslavia | | | | | | • | | • | • | • | • | • | • |
| South Africa | RSA | | | | | | | • | • | • | • | | | | • |
| South Korea | KOR | | | | | • | • | • | • | • | • | • | H | • | • |
| Spain | ESP | | | • | • | • | • | • | • | • | • | • | • | • | • |
| Sweden | SWE | H | • | • | • | • | • | • | • | • | • | • | • | • | • |
| Switzerland | SUI | • | • | • | • | • | • | • | • | • | • | • | • | • | • |
| T | Code | 76 | 80 | 84 | 88 | 92 | 94 | 98 | 02 | 06 | 10 | 14 | 18 | 22 | 26 |
| Tajikistan | TJK | Soviet Union | | | | ^{EUN} | | | | | | | • | | |
| Turkey | TUR | | | | | | | | | | | • | • | | |
| U | Code | 76 | 80 | 84 | 88 | 92 | 94 | 98 | 02 | 06 | 10 | 14 | 18 | 22 | 26 |
| Uganda | UGA | • | • | | | | | | | | | | | | |
| Ukraine | UKR | Soviet Union | | | | ^{EUN} | | • | • | • | • | • | • | • | • |
| United States | USA | • | • | • | • | • | • | • | H | • | • | • | • | • | • |
| Uzbekistan | UZB | Soviet Union | | | | ^{EUN} | | | | | | • | • | | • |
| Total | | 16 | 18 | 21 | 22 | 24 | 31 | 32 | 36 | 39 | 44 | 45 | 49 | 46 | 56 |

=== Nations that have never competed ===
113 of the 176 active NPCs have yet to compete in a Winter Paralympics.

| Nation | Code |
|---|---|
| Afghanistan | AFG |
| Albania | ALB |
| Algeria | ALG |
| Angola | ANG |
| Antigua and Barbuda | ANT |
| Aruba | ARU |
| Bahamas | BAH |
| Bahrain | BRN |
| Bangladesh | BAN |
| Barbados | BAR |
| Benin | BEN |
| Bermuda | BER |
| Botswana | BOT |
| Brunei | BRU |
| Burkina Faso | BUR |
| Burundi | BDI |
| Cambodia | CAM |
| Cameroon | CMR |
| Cape Verde | CPV |
| Central African Republic | CAF |
| Chinese Taipei | TPE |
| Colombia | COL |
| Comoros | COM |
| Republic of the Congo | CGO |
| Democratic Republic of the Congo | COD |
| Costa Rica | CRC |
| Ivory Coast | CIV |
| Cuba | CUB |
| Cyprus | CYP |
| Djibouti | DJI |
| Dominican Republic | DOM |
| Ecuador | ECU |
| Egypt | EGY |
| Eritrea | ERI |
| Ethiopia | ETH |
| Faroe Islands | FRO |
| Fiji | FIJ |
| Gabon | GAB |
| The Gambia | GAM |
| Ghana | GHA |
| Grenada | GRN |
| Guatemala | GUA |
| Guinea | GUI |
| Guinea-Bissau | GBS |
| Guyana | GUY |
| Honduras | HON |
| Hong Kong | HKG |
| India | IND |
| Indonesia | INA |
| Iraq | IRQ |
| Ireland | IRL |
| Jamaica | JAM |
| Jordan | JOR |
| Kenya | KEN |
| Kiribati | KIR |
| Kosovo | KOS |
| Kuwait | KUW |
| Laos | LAO |
| Lebanon | LIB |
| Lesotho | LES |
| Liberia | LBR |
| Libya | LBA |
| Luxembourg | LUX |
| Macau | MAC |
| Madagascar | MAD |
| Malawi | MAW |
| Malaysia | MAS |
| Maldives | MDV |
| Mali | MLI |
| Malta | MLT |
| Mauritania | MTN |
| Mauritius | MRI |
| Moldova | MDA |
| Montenegro | MNE |
| Morocco | MAR |
| Mozambique | MOZ |
| Myanmar | MYA |
| Namibia | NAM |
| Nepal | NEP |
| Nicaragua | NCA |
| Niger | NIG |
| Nigeria | NGR |
| Oman | OMA |
| Pakistan | PAK |
| Palestine | PLE |
| Panama | PAN |
| Papua New Guinea | PNG |
| Peru | PER |
| Philippines | PHI |
| Qatar | QAT |
| Rwanda | RWA |
| Saint Vincent and the Grenadines | VIN |
| Samoa | SAM |
| San Marino | SMR |
| São Tomé and Príncipe | STP |
| Saudi Arabia | KSA |
| Senegal | SEN |
| Seychelles | SEY |
| Sierra Leone | SLE |
| Singapore | SIN |
| Solomon Islands | SOL |
| Somalia | SOM |
| Sri Lanka | SRI |
| Sudan | SUD |
| Suriname | SUR |
| Syria | SYR |
| Tanzania | TAN |
| Thailand | THA |
| Timor-Leste | TLS |
| Togo | TOG |
| Tonga | TGA |
| Trinidad and Tobago | TRI |
| Tunisia | TUN |
| Turkmenistan | TKM |
| United Arab Emirates | UAE |
| Uruguay | URU |
| Vanuatu | VAN |
| Venezuela | VEN |
| Vietnam | VIE |
| Virgin Islands | ISV |
| Yemen | YEM |
| Zambia | ZAM |
| Zimbabwe | ZIM |
