= Guinea at the 2020 Summer Olympics =

- IOC code: GUI
- NOC: Comité National Olympique et Sportif Guinéen

in Tokyo, Japan July 23, 2021 – August 8, 2021
- Competitors: 5 in 4 sports
- Flag bearer (opening): TOCOG Volunteer
- Flag bearer (closing): Fatoumata Camara
- Medals: Gold 0 Silver 0 Bronze 0 Total 0

Summer Olympics appearances (overview)
- 1968; 1972–1976; 1980; 1984; 1988; 1992; 1996; 2000; 2004; 2008; 2012; 2016; 2020; 2024

Guinea competed at the 2020 Summer Olympics in Tokyo. Originally scheduled to take place from 24 July to 9 August 2020, the Games were postponed to 23 July to 8 August 2021, because of the COVID-19 pandemic. It was the nation's twelfth appearance at the Summer Olympics since its debut in 1968. Guinea failed to register any athletes at the 1972 Summer Olympics in Munich and eventually joined the rest of the African nations to boycott the 1976 Summer Olympics in Montreal. On 22 July, the eve of the opening ceremony, Guinea announced it would withdraw from the Games due to COVID-19 concerns, but later reversed its decision.

== Competitors ==
The following is a list of the number of competitors that will participate in the Games.

Sport	Men	Women	Total
Athletics	0	1	1
Judo	1	0	1
Swimming	1	1	2
Wrestling	0	1	1
Total	2	3	5

== Athletics ==
Guinea received a universality slot from the World Athletics to send a female athlete to the Olympics.

Key

- Note–Ranks given for track events are within the athlete's heat only
- Q = Qualified for the next round
- q = Qualified for the next round as a fastest loser or, in field events, by position without achieving the qualifying target
- NR = National record
- N/A = Round not applicable for the event
- Bye = Athlete not required to compete in round

Track & road events

Athlete	Event	Preliminary		Round 1		Semifinal		Final	
Athlete	Event	Result	Rank	Result	Rank	Result	Rank	Result	Rank
Aïssata Deen Conte	Women's 100 m	12.43 PB	7	Did not advance					

== Judo ==
Guinea received an invitation from the Tripartite Commission and the International Judo Federation to send Mamadou Samba Bah in the men's lightweight category (73 kg) to the Olympics.

Athlete	Event	Round of 64	Round of 32	Round of 16	Quarterfinals	Semifinals	Repechage	Final / BM	
Athlete	Event	Opposition Result	Opposition Result	Opposition Result	Opposition Result	Opposition Result	Opposition Result	Opposition Result	Rank
Mamadou Samba Bah	Men's −73 kg	Bye	Tsend-Ochir (MGL); L 00–10	Did not advance					

== Swimming ==
Guinea received a universality invitation from FINA to send two top-ranked swimmers (one per gender) in their respective individual events to the Olympics, based on the FINA Points System of June 28, 2021.

Athlete	Event	Heat		Semifinal		Final	
Athlete	Event	Time	Rank	Time	Rank	Time	Rank
Mamadou Bah	Men's 50 m freestyle	26.52	61	Did not advance			
Mariama Touré	Women's 100 m breaststroke	DNS		Did not advance			

== Wrestling ==
For the first time since Seoul 1988, Guinea qualified one wrestler for the women's freestyle 57 kg into the Olympic competition, by progressing to the top two finals at the 2021 African & Oceania Qualification Tournament in Hammamet, Tunisia.

Key:

- VT (ranking points: 5–0 or 0–5) – Victory by fall.
- VB (ranking points: 5–0 or 0–5) – Victory by injury (VF for forfeit, VA for withdrawal or disqualification)
- PP (ranking points: 3–1 or 1–3) – Decision by points – the loser with technical points.
- PO (ranking points: 3–0 or 0–3) – Decision by points – the loser without technical points.
- ST (ranking points: 4–0 or 0–4) – Great superiority – the loser without technical points and a margin of victory of at least 8 (Greco-Roman) or 10 (freestyle) points.
- SP (ranking points: 4–1 or 1–4) – Technical superiority – the loser with technical points and a margin of victory of at least 8 (Greco-Roman) or 10 (freestyle) points.

Freestyle

Athlete	Event	Round of 16	Quarterfinal	Semifinal	Repechage	Final / BM	
Athlete	Event	Opposition Result	Opposition Result	Opposition Result	Opposition Result	Opposition Result	Rank
Fatoumata Camara	Women's −57 kg	Kawai (JPN); L 1–3 ^{PP}	Did not advance		Boldsaikhan (MGL); L 0–4 ^{ST}	Did not advance	12

== See also ==
- Guinea at the 2020 Summer Paralympics
