= Guinea at the 2008 Summer Olympics =

- IOC code: GUI
- NOC: Guinean National Olympic and Sports Committee

in Beijing
- Competitors: 5 in 3 sports
- Flag bearer: Fatmata Fofanah
- Medals: Gold 0 Silver 0 Bronze 0 Total 0

Summer Olympics appearances (overview)
- 1968; 1972–1976; 1980; 1984; 1988; 1992; 1996; 2000; 2004; 2008; 2012; 2016; 2020; 2024

Guinea was represented at the 2008 Summer Olympics in Beijing, China by the Guinean National Olympic and Sports Committee.

In total, five athletes including two men and three women represented Guinea in three different sports including athletics, swimming and taekwondo.

== Competitors ==
In total, five athletes represented Guinea at the 2008 Summer Olympics in Beijing, China across three different sports.

Sport	Men	Women	Total
Athletics	1	1	2
Swimming	1	1	2
Taekwondo	0	1	1
Total	2	3	5

== Athletics ==
In total, two Guinean athletes participated in the athletics events – Fatmata Fofanah in the women's 100 m hurdles and Nabie Foday Fofanah in the men's 200 m.

The heats for the men's 200 m took place on 16 August 2008. After one false start, Nabie Foday Fofanah finished seventh in his heat in a time of 21.68 seconds and he did not advance to the quarter-finals.

Athlete	Event	Heat		Semifinal		Final	
Athlete	Event	Time	Rank	Time	Rank	Time	Rank
Nabie Foday Fofanah	200 m	21.68	7	Did not advance			

The heats for the women's 100 m hurdles took place on 17 August 2008. Fatmata Fofanah did not finish her heat.

Athlete	Event	Heat		Semifinal		Final	
Athlete	Event	Time	Rank	Time	Rank	Time	Rank
Fatmata Fofanah	100 m hurdles	DNF		Did not advance			

== Swimming ==
In total, two Guinean athletes participated in the swimming events – Mamadou Cisse in the men's 50 m freestyle and Djene Barry in the women's 50 m freestyle.

The heats for the men's 50 m freestyle took place on 14 August 2008. Cisse finished eighth in his heat in a time of 29.29 seconds which was ultimately not fast enough to advance to the semi-finals.

Athlete	Event	Heat		Semifinal		Final	
Athlete	Event	Time	Rank	Time	Rank	Time	Rank
Mamadou Cisse	50 m freestyle	29.29	89	did not advance			

The heats for the women's 50 m freestyle took place on 15 August 2008. Barry finished fourth in her heat in a time of 39.8 seconds which was ultimately not fast enough to advance to the semi-finals.

Athlete	Event	Heat		Semifinal		Final	
Athlete	Event	Time	Rank	Time	Rank	Time	Rank
Djene Barry	50 m freestyle	39.80	89	did not advance			

== Taekwondo ==
In total, one Guinean athlete participated in the taekwondo events – Mariama Dalanda Barry in the women's −67 kg category.

The women's −67 kg category took place on 22 August 2008. In the first round, Barry lost to Helena Fromm of Germany.

Athlete	Event	Round of 16	Quarterfinals	Semifinals	Repechage	Bronze Medal	Final	
Athlete	Event	Opposition Result	Opposition Result	Opposition Result	Opposition Result	Opposition Result	Opposition Result	Rank
Mariama Dalanda Barry	Women's −67 kg	Fromm (GER); L 1–6	did not advance					
