= Guinea at the 1984 Summer Olympics =

- IOC code: GUI
- NOC: Comité National Olympique et Sportif Guinéen

in Los Angeles
- Competitors: 1
- Medals: Gold 0 Silver 0 Bronze 0 Total 0

Summer Olympics appearances (overview)
- 1968; 1972–1976; 1980; 1984; 1988; 1992; 1996; 2000; 2004; 2008; 2012; 2016; 2020; 2024

Guinea competed at the 1984 Summer Olympics in Los Angeles, United States.

== Results by Event ==
=== Judo ===
- Abdoulaye Diallo
