= Soryba Diakité =

Guinean sprinter

Soryba Diakité (born 1 June 1969) is a former Guinean athlete who competed in the men's 100m competition at the 1992 Summer Olympics. He recorded an 11.10, not enough to qualify for the next round past the heats. His personal best is 10.40, set in 1990. He also competed in the long jump contest that Olympiad, but didn't make it past qualifying in that discipline either.

Olympic Games
| Preceded by Ousmane Diallo | Flagbearer for Guinea; Barcelona 1992 | Succeeded by Joseph Loua |
