= Nabie Foday Fofanah =

Guinean sprinter

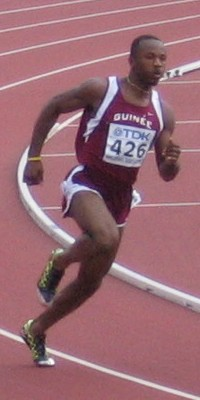
Nabie Foday Fofanah at the 2005 World Championships

Nabie Foday Fofanah (born 8 February 1980) is a 2 x Olympian sprinter from Guinea, born in Freetown, Sierra Leone and currently living in Los Angeles, CA. He competed in the 2004 and 2008 Olympic Games, in the 100 and 200 meters, he acted as a flag bearer for his country. He relocated in Los Angeles, where he created the successful Speed Doctor brand (Speeddoctor.com). He then became one of the most Elite trainers in world, training NBA player Chris Paul, NFL player Todd Gurley amongst many other professional athletes.

== Career ==
Fofanah grew up in Guinea, Canada, France and (since 1998) the United States, attending Lehman College of the City University of New York from 2001 to 2004, and running track with their team, where he was a three-time NCAA Division III All-American and set a school record of 10.45 for the 100 meter.

=== Olympics ===
Although he never achieved the "A" or "B" Olympic Qualifying Standards for the 2004 and 2008 Olympic games, he was allowed to compete under rule 3.5 NOCs without Qualified Athletes. He competed in 100 and 200 meters at the 2004 Olympic Games. He was eliminated in the heats after running a time of 21.45 seconds in the 200m, and a time of 10.62 seconds in the 100m, and he carried his nation's flag in the opening ceremonies. He later competed at the 2005 World Championships. In 2008, representing the 2008 Guinean Olympic squad in the Men's 200 m, he clocked a time of 21.68 seconds, and was eliminated in the heats.

His personal best 100 m time is 10.47 seconds. His personal best 200 m time is 21.05 seconds, achieved in June 2004 in Cambridge, MA.

== Personal ==
Fofanah lived in New York City until 2013, where he worked as a personal trainer, and trained at the Sports Center at Chelsea Piers in Manhattan, NY. He has now relocated to Los Angeles where he, under the Speed Doctor brand, is the leading trainer in speed training, 40 yard dash training, vertical jump training and is the creator of various revolutionary sports performance programs in Los Angeles.

His younger sister, Fatmata Fofanah, is a Women's 100 m hurdler, who also competed at the 2008 Olympics for Guinea.

Olympic Games
Preceded by Joseph Loua	Flagbearer for Guinea; Athens 2004; Beijing 2008	Succeeded by Facinet Keita
