= Mahawa Bangoura =

Guinean politician

Mahawa Bangoura Camara (born 13 March 1927) is a Guinean diplomat and politician. She is the first woman to serve as Foreign Minister of Guinea. She was Guinea's Ambassador to the United States, and its permanent representative at the United Nations.

== Early life ==
Mahawa Bangoura Camara was born on 13 March 1927 in Conakry, Guinea.

== Career ==
Bangoura was appointed Guinea's Ambassador to the United States in 1995.

Bangoura was Guinea's permanent representative at the United Nations until June 2000, when she became the country's first woman foreign minister, succeeding Zainoul Abidine Sannoussi. She was appointed by the President Lansana Conte during a reshuffle which saw five senior ministers being replaced. Bangoura and the new security and interior minister Ahmadou Camara became secretaries of state, and senior status within the cabinet behind the Prime Minister, Lamine Sidime.

In August 2001, she met with her Liberian and Sierra Leonean counterparts in Monrovia, Liberia to try to bring peace to the three countries of the Mano River Union (MRU). Bangoura remained foreign minister until 2002.
