= Djene Barry =

Guinean swimmer

Personal information
- Nationality: Guinea
- Born: 6 February 1982 (age 44)
- Height: 1.79 m (5 ft 10 in)
- Weight: 70 kg (150 lb)

Sport
- Sport: Swimming
- Event: Freestyle

Djene Barry (born February 6, 1982, in Conakry) is a Guinean swimmer, specialized in sprint freestyle events. She competed at the 2008 Summer Olympics in Beijing, where she finished eighty-ninth overall for the heats in the women's 50 m freestyle event, with a time of 39.80 seconds.
