= Safiatou Acquaviva =

Guinean sprinter and hurdler (born 1999)

Personal information
- Born: March 10, 1999 (age 27)

Sport
- Country: Guinea
- Sport: Sport of athletics
- Event(s): 100 metres, 100 metres hurdles

Achievements and titles
- Personal bests: 100mH: 13.24 (2024); 100m: 11.95 (2024)
- Updated on March 17, 2025

Safiatou Acquaviva (born 10 March 1999) is a Guinean and French sprinter and hurdler. She has won medals at French national championships and has represented Guinea at the Olympic Games, African Games, and African Athletics Championships.

== Career ==
Acquaviva began training in athletics at 8 years old. She competed at the French U20 indoor and outdoor championships beginning in 2017, and was 3rd in the 60 metres hurdles at the 2018 French U20 indoor championships.

Acquaviva won silver medals at the 2019 and 2020 French University Championships over 60 m hurdles. She qualified for the 100 metres hurdles finals of the 2023 French Athletics Championships, running 13.65 seconds to finish 7th.

In March 2024, Acquaviva represented Guinea at the 2024 African Games, placing 9th in her 100 m heat and not advancing. In June, she advanced to the 100 m hurdles finals of the 2024 African Championships in Athletics, where she ran 13.66 seconds to finish 7th.

Acquaviva was seeded in the 3rd preliminary round of the 100 m at the 2024 Summer Olympics. She ran 11.97, a new Guinean national record, to place 5th and advance to the quarter-finals. In the quarter-finals, she ran 12.07 seconds to place 9th and did not advance. She was surprised by how bouncy the Olympic track was.

== Personal life ==
Acquaviva is from Aix-en-Provence, France. Her mother was a hairdresser and she had a sister.

She studied international criminal justice at Paris-Panthéon-Assas University. She trains in Ivry-sur-Seine, living in CROUS housing at the 8th arrondissement of Paris.
