= Guinea at the Paralympics =

- IPC code: GUI
- NPC: Guinea Paralympic Committee
- Medals: Gold 0 Silver 0 Bronze 0 Total 0

Summer appearances
- 2004; 2008; 2012; 2016; 2020; 2024

Guinea made its Paralympic Games début at the 2004 Summer Paralympics in Athens, sending a single representative (Ahmed Barry) to compete in athletics. He took part in two events, and did not win a medal. Barry was, again, Guinea's sole representative at the 2008 Summer Paralympics in Beijing. Entering only one race on that occasion, he was a non-starter.

Guinea has never taken part in the Winter Paralympics.

== Full results for Guinea at the Paralympics ==
Name	Games	Sport	Event	Score	Rank
Ahmed Barry	2004 Athens	Athletics	Men's 100 m T46	13.00	7th in heat 2; did not advance
Ahmed Barry	2004 Athens	Athletics	Men's 200 m T46	25.87	8th in heat 1; did not advance
Ahmed Barry	2008 Beijing	Athletics	Men's 200 m T46	dns	dns in heat 3
Mohamed Camara	2016 Rio	Athletics	Men's 400 m T47	57.55	6th in heat 2; did not advance
Bacou Dambakaté	2020 Tokyo	Athletics	Men's 100 m T13	12.24	5th in heat 3; did not advance
Kadiatou Bangoura	2020 Tokyo	Athletics	Women's 200 m T47	28.25	6th in heat 2; did not advance
Kadiatou Bangoura	2020 Tokyo	Athletics	Women's 400 m T47	1:02.75	5th in heat 2; did not advance
Yamoussa Sylla	2024 Paris	Athletics	Men's 100 m T47	12.11	7th in heat 2; did not advance
Yamoussa Sylla	2024 Paris	Athletics	Men's long jump T47	5.70 m	7th
Kadiatou Bangoura	2024 Paris	Athletics	Women's 200 m T47	28.47	6th in heat 1; did not advance
Kadiatou Bangoura	2024 Paris	Athletics	Women's 400 m T47	1:06.09	6th in heat 1; did not advance

== See also ==
- Guinea at the Olympics
