= Facinet Keita =

Guinean judoka

Personal information
- Born: 23 March 1984 (age 41)
- Occupation: Judoka

Sport
- Sport: Judo

Profile at external databases
- IJF: 10550
- JudoInside.com: 86434

Facinet Keita (born 23 March 1984 in Conakry, Guinea) is a Guinean judoka who competed in the Men's 100+ kg category at the 2012 Summer Olympics in London. He lost to Ricardo Blas, Jr. in the first round. Keita was the flag bearer for Guinea at the opening ceremony.

Olympic Games
Preceded by Nabie Foday Fofanah	Flagbearer for Guinea; London 2012	Succeeded by Mamadama Bangoura
