= Amadou Sy Savané =

Guinean sprinter

Personal information
- Nationality: Guinean
- Born: 16 May 1974 (age 52)
- Relatives: Mohamed Sy Savané (brother)

Sport
- Sport: Sprinting
- Event: 200 metres
Medal record
Men's athletics
Representing Guinea
West African Championships
Bronze medal – third place	1995 Dakar	400 m

Alpha Amadou Sy Savané (born 16 May 1974) is a Guinean sprinter. He competed in the men's 200 metres and 400 metres hurdles at the 1992 Summer Olympics and the 400 metres hurdles at the 1996 Summer Olympics.

Sy Savané first competed at the 1991 World Championships in Athletics in the 400 metres, where he was seeded in the second heat but was ultimately disqualified.

At the 1992 Summer Olympics, Sy Savané qualified in both the 400 metres hurdles and the flat 200 metres, with both first-round heats scheduled on the same day. He ran 21.86 seconds in the 200 m and 54.26 seconds in the 400 m hurdles, placing 7th in his heat in both events and failing to advance.

Sy Savané ran the 400 m hurdles again at the 1994 Francophone Games, placing 6th in his heat and failing to advance.

Sy Savané won his first international medal at the 1995 West African Athletics Championships in Dakar. Entered in the 400 m, he ran 47.87 seconds to win the bronze medal. In September 1995, Sy Savané participated in the 1995 All-Africa Games. He ran 47.60 seconds in the flat 400 m, outside of the medals but setting the Guinean record in the discipline.

He returned to the Olympics for the 1996 Atlanta Games, this time entered only in the 400 m hurdles. Sy Savane ran 50.90 seconds to place 7th in his quarter-final and did not advance to the semi-finals.

At a May 1998 meeting in Atlanta, Georgia, Sy Savané set his personal best of 50.81 seconds in the 400 m hurdles. His time still stands as the Guinean national record over the event.

== Personal life ==
Amadou Sy Savané coaches his son Abdoul Sy Savané, who won the 2023 New Balance Nationals Indoor championships in the 60 metres hurdles. Representing Atlanta Zoom Athletics in Atlanta, Georgia, Abdoul's winning time of 7.59 seconds was the #4 in United States high school history.

His elder brother, Mohamed Malal Sy Savané, is a middle-distance runner who competed at the 1992 Summer Olympics; he set Guinean national records there in his heats for both the men's 800 metres and 1500 metres. He had previously set the 10,000 metres Guinean record of 32:27.5 at a 1989 competition in Conakry.
