= Ousmane Diallo (wrestler) =

Guinean wrestler

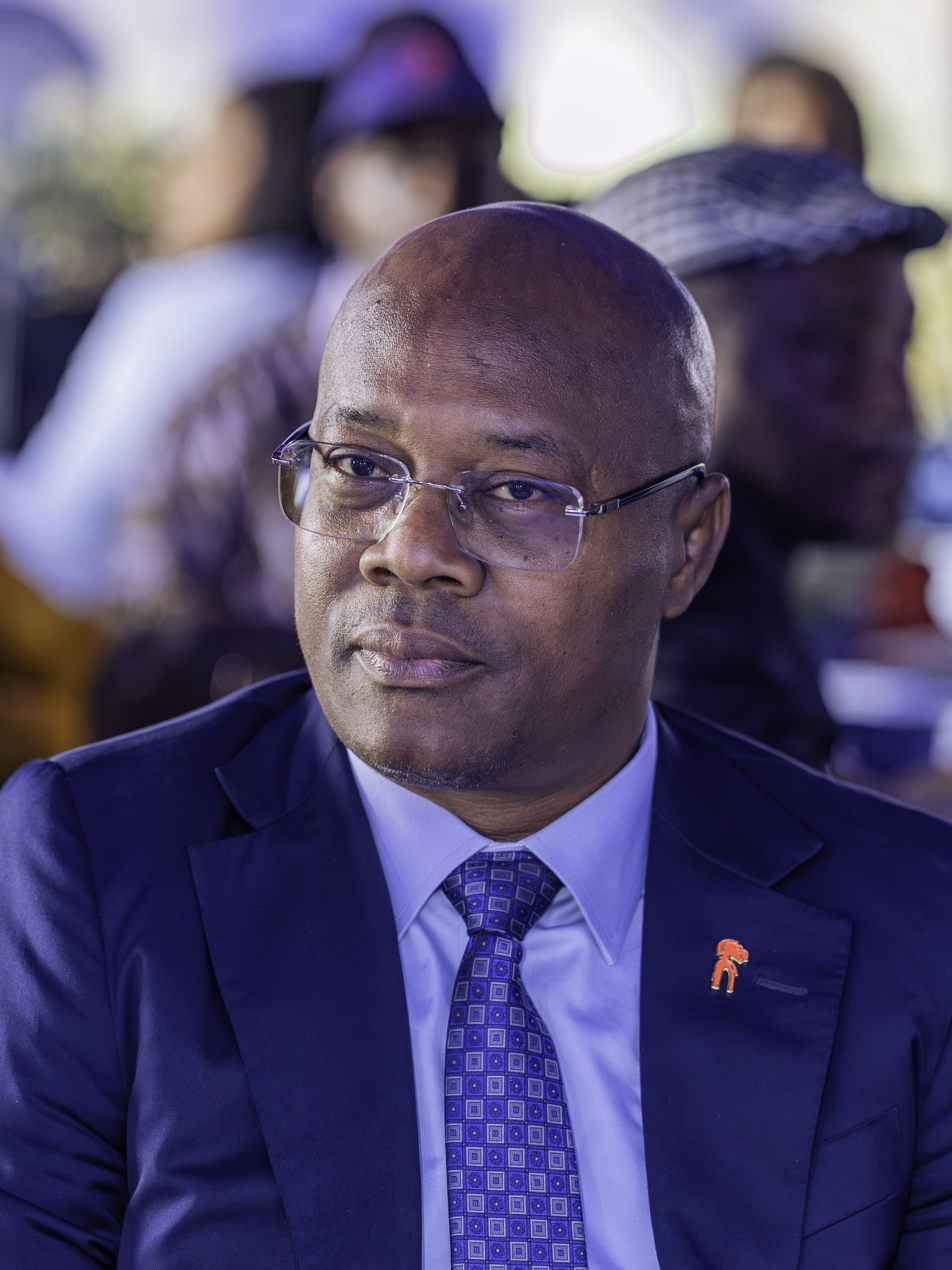
- Ousmane Gaoual Diallo 2026

Personal information
- Nationality: Guinean
- Born: 1968 (age 57–58)

Sport
- Sport: Wrestling

Ousmane Diallo (born 1968) is a Guinean wrestler. He competed in the men's freestyle 52 kg at the 1988 Summer Olympics. He has been the Minister of Town Planning and Housing since November 4, 2021 in the Mohamed Béavogui government.

Olympic Games
| Preceded by Abdoulaye Diallo | Flagbearer for Guinea; Seoul 1988 | Succeeded by Soryba Diakité |
