= Guinea at the 1980 Summer Olympics =

- IOC code: GUI
- NOC: Comité National Olympique et Sportif Guinéen

in Moscow
- Competitors: 10 in 3 sports
- Medals: Gold 0 Silver 0 Bronze 0 Total 0

Summer Olympics appearances (overview)
- 1968; 1972–1976; 1980; 1984; 1988; 1992; 1996; 2000; 2004; 2008; 2012; 2016; 2020; 2024

Guinea competed at the 1980 Summer Olympics in Moscow, USSR. The nation returned to the Olympic Games after missing the 1972 and 1976 Games.

== Results by event ==
=== Athletics ===
Men's 100 metres

- Paul Haba

- Heat — 11.19 (→ did not advance)

Men's 200 metres

- Paul Haba

- Heat — 22.70 (→ did not advance)

Men's 400 metres

- Mohamed Diakité

- Heat — 49.59 (→ did not advance)

Men's 800 metres

- Sekou Camara

- Heat — 1:58.9 (→ did not advance)

=== Boxing ===
Men's Flyweight (51 kg)

- Aguibou Barry

- First Round — Lost to Hassen Sherif (Ethiopia) after disqualification in second round

Men's Bantamweight (54 kg)

- Samba Jacob Diallo

- First Round — Bye
- Second Round — Lost to Ganapathy Manoharan (India) on points (1-4)

=== Judo ===
- Ibrahim Camara
- Abdoulaye Diallo
- Mamadou Diallo

- First Round — Bye
- Second Round — Lost in Judo at the 1980 Summer Olympics – Men's 65 kg
