= Joseph Loua =

Guinean sprinter (born 1976)

Medal record

Men's athletics

Representing Guinea

African Championships
Silver medal – second place	1996 Yaoundé	200 m

Joseph Loua (born 15 November 1976) is a retired Guinean sprinter who specialized in the 200 metres.

He won a silver medal in this event at the 1996 African Championships. He also entered the World Championships in 1995, 1997 and 1999 as well as the Olympic Games in 1996 and 2000, but never reached the final round.

Olympic Games
Preceded by Soryba Diakité	Flagbearer for Guinea; Atlanta 1996; Sydney 2000	Succeeded by Nabie Foday Fofanah
