= Mohamed Lamine Dansoko =

Guinean sprinter

Personal information
- Full name: Mohamed Lamine Dansoko
- Born: 15 March 1998 (age 28) Conakry, Guinea
- Height: 1.81 m (5 ft 11 in)
- Weight: 78 kg (172 lb)

Sport
- Country: Guinea
- Sport: Athletics
- Event: Sprint

Achievements and titles
- Personal best: 100 m: 10.93 s (2015)
- Updated on 29 August 2015

Mohamed Lamine Dansoko (born 15 March 1998) is a Guinean male sprinter, specializing in the 100 metres. He represented his nation Guinea at the 2016 Summer Olympics in Rio de Janeiro, and also achieved a personal best of 10.93 seconds in his signature race at the 2015 All-Africa Games in Brazzaville, Republic of the Congo.

At the 2016 Summer Olympics, Dansoko competed for the Guinean squad in the men's 100 metres. There, he ran the first of three heats against seven other sprinters with a sixth-place time of 11.05 seconds, failing to progress from the preliminary round.
