= Guinean National Olympic and Sports Committee =

National Olympic Committee of Guinea

- Country: Guinea
- Code: GUI
- Created: 1964
- Recognized: 1965
- Continental Association: ANOCA
- Headquarters: Conakry
- President: Nabi Camara
- Secretary General: Ben Daouda Nassoko

The Guinean National Olympic and Sports Committee (French: Comité National Olympique et Sportif Guinéen) (IOC code: GUI) is the National Olympic Committee representing Guinea.
