= Football at the 2024 Summer Olympics – Men's tournament – Group A =

Group A of the men's football tournament at the 2024 Summer Olympics was played from 24 to 30 July 2024. The group consisted of hosts France, Guinea, New Zealand and the United States. The top two teams, France and the United States, advanced to the knockout stage.

== Teams ==
Draw position	Team	Pot	Confederation	Method of qualification	Date of qualification	Olympic appearance	Last appearance	Previous best performance
A1	France	1	UEFA	Hosts	13 September 2017	14th	2020	Gold medalists (1984)
A2	United States	3	CONCACAF	2022 CONCACAF U-20 Championship top two	1 July 2022	15th	2008	Silver medalists (1904)
A3	Guinea (Note: The play-off winner was not known at the time of the draw.)	4	CAF	AFC–CAF play-off winner	9 May 2024	2nd	1968	Eleventh place (1968)
A4	New Zealand	2	OFC	2023 OFC Men's Olympic Qualifying Tournament winner	9 September 2023	4th	2020	Sixth place (2020)

== Standings ==
Pos	Team	Pld	W	D	L	GF	GA	GD	Pts	Qualification
1	France (H)	3	3	0	0	7	0	+7	9	Advance to knockout stage
2	United States	3	2	0	1	7	4	+3	6	Advance to knockout stage
3	New Zealand	3	1	0	2	3	8	−5	3	
4	Guinea	3	0	0	3	1	6	−5	0	

Source: FIFA
Rules for classification: Group stage tiebreakers
(H) Hosts

In the quarter-finals:

- The winners of Group A, France, advance to play the runners-up of Group B, Argentina.
- The runners-up of Group A, the United States, advance to play the winners of Group B, Morocco.

== Matches ==
=== Guinea vs New Zealand ===
24 July 2024
17:00

Guinea	1–2	New Zealand
Diawara 72'	Report	Garbett 25'; Waine 76'

Stade de Nice, Nice
Attendance: 4,909
Referee: Adel Al-Naqbi (United Arab Emirates)

Guinea	New Zealand

GK	1	Soumaïla Sylla
RB	3	Bangaly Cissé
CB	4	Mohamed Soumah	(yellow card) 90+9'
CB	6	Amadou Diawara
LB	13	Madiou Keita
CM	8	Naby Keïta (c)		(substituted off) 87'
CM	17	Abdoulaye Touré		(substituted off) 73'
RW	14	Amadou Diallo		(substituted off) 79'
AM	10	Ilaix Moriba		(substituted off) 74'
LW	7	Aliou Baldé
CF	12	Algassime Bah
Substitutes:
GK	16	Mory Keita
DF	2	Naby Oularé		(substituted on) 79'
DF	20	Chérif Camara
MF	15	Issiaga Camara		(substituted on) 73'
FW	9	Henry Camara		(substituted on) 87'
FW	11	Ousmane Camara		(substituted on) 74'
Manager:
Kaba Diawara

GK	1	Alex Paulsen
CB	2	Michael Boxall
CB	5	Finn Surman
CB	4	Tyler Bindon
DM	6	Joe Bell	(yellow card) 90+6'
RM	9	Ben Waine
CM	7	Matthew Garbett (c)		(substituted off) 84'
CM	17	Lachlan Bayliss		(substituted off) 77'
LM	3	Sam Sutton
CF	10	Sarpreet Singh
CF	14	Jay Herdman		(substituted off) 77'
Substitutes:
GK	12	Kees Sims
DF	13	Lukas Kelly-Heald		(substituted on) 84'
DF	15	Matthew Sheridan
MF	16	Fin Conchie
FW	18	Oskar van Hattum		(substituted on) 77'
FW	19	Liam Gillion		(substituted on) 77'
DF	20	Isaac Hughes
Manager:
(United Kingdom) Darren Bazeley

Assistant referees:
Ahmed Al-Rashadi (United Arab Emirates)
Sabet Obaid Suroor Al-Ali (United Arab Emirates)
Fourth official:
Veronika Bernatskaia (Kyrgyzstan)
Video assistant referee:
Khamis Al-Marri (Qatar)
Assistant video assistant referee:
Rob Dieperink (Netherlands)

=== France vs United States ===
24 July 2024
21:00

France	3–0	United States
Lacazette 61'; Olise 69'; Badé 85'	Report

Stade de Marseille, Marseille
Attendance: 48,721
Referee: Yael Falcón (Argentina)

France	United States

GK	16	Guillaume Restes
RB	5	Kiliann Sildillia	(yellow card) 17'
CB	4	Loïc Badé
CB	2	Castello Lukeba
LB	3	Adrien Truffert
CM	6	Manu Koné		(substituted off) 87'
CM	13	Joris Chotard
RW	12	Enzo Millot		(substituted off) 71'
AM	10	Alexandre Lacazette (c)
LW	7	Michael Olise		(substituted off) 82'
CF	14	Jean-Philippe Mateta		(substituted off) 71'
Substitutes:
GK	1	Obed Nkambadio
DF	15	Bradley Locko
DF	17	Soungoutou Magassa		(substituted on) 87'
MF	8	Maghnes Akliouche		(substituted on) 71'
MF	11	Désiré Doué		(substituted on) 82'
FW	9	Arnaud Kalimuendo		(substituted on) 71'
FW	18	Rayan Cherki
Manager:
Thierry Henry

GK	1	Patrick Schulte
RB	2	Nathan Harriel
CB	12	Miles Robinson
CB	3	Walker Zimmerman
LB	5	John Tolkin
CM	6	Gianluca Busio		(substituted off) 71'
CM	8	Tanner Tessmann (c)
RW	11	Paxten Aaronson		(substituted off) 76'
AM	14	Djordje Mihailovic		(substituted off) 76'
LW	7	Kevin Paredes	(yellow card) 37'	(substituted off) 76'
CF	13	Duncan McGuire		(substituted off) 86'
Substitutes:
GK	18	Gabriel Slonina
DF	4	Maximilian Dietz		(substituted on) 71'
DF	17	Caleb Wiley		(substituted on) 86'
MF	15	Benjamin Cremaschi
MF	16	Jack McGlynn		(substituted on) 76'
FW	9	Griffin Yow		(substituted on) 76'
FW	10	Taylor Booth		(substituted on) 76'
Manager:
(Serbia) Marko Mitrović

Assistant referees:
Maximiliano Del Yesso (Argentina)
Facundo Rodríguez (Argentina)
Fourth official:
Anahí Fernández (Uruguay)
Video assistant referee:
Carlos del Cerro Grande (Spain)
Assistant video assistant referee:
Guillermo Pacheco (Mexico)

=== New Zealand vs United States ===
27 July 2024
19:00

New Zealand	1–4	United States
Randall 78'	Report	Mihailovic 8' (pen.); Zimmerman 12'; Busio 30'; Aaronson 58'

Stade de Marseille, Marseille
Attendance: 9,468
Referee: Glenn Nyberg (Sweden)

New Zealand	United States

GK	1	Alex Paulsen
CB	2	Michael Boxall
CB	5	Finn Surman
CB	4	Tyler Bindon
DM	6	Joe Bell		(substituted off) 76'
RM	9	Ben Waine		(substituted off) 76'
CM	7	Matthew Garbett (c)
CM	17	Lachlan Bayliss		(substituted off) 46'
LM	3	Sam Sutton	(yellow card) 65'
CF	10	Sarpreet Singh		(substituted off) 84'
CF	14	Jay Herdman		(substituted off) 46'
Substitutes:
GK	12	Kees Sims
DF	13	Lukas Kelly-Heald		(substituted on) 76'
DF	15	Matthew Sheridan		(substituted on) 76'
MF	16	Fin Conchie
FW	11	Jesse Randall		(substituted on) 46'
FW	18	Oskar van Hattum		(substituted on) 46'
FW	19	Liam Gillion		(substituted on) 84'
Manager:
(United Kingdom) Darren Bazeley

GK	1	Patrick Schulte
RB	2	Nathan Harriel		(substituted off) 69'
CB	12	Miles Robinson
CB	3	Walker Zimmerman
LB	5	John Tolkin
DM	8	Tanner Tessmann (c)	(yellow card) 45+2'
CM	6	Gianluca Busio		(substituted off) 36'
CM	14	Djordje Mihailovic		(substituted off) 56'
RF	7	Kevin Paredes		(substituted off) 69'
CF	13	Duncan McGuire		(substituted off) 57'
LF	11	Paxten Aaronson
Substitutes:
GK	18	Gabriel Slonina
DF	4	Maximilian Dietz		(substituted on) 56'
DF	17	Caleb Wiley
MF	15	Benjamin Cremaschi		(substituted on) 69'
MF	16	Jack McGlynn		(substituted on) 36'
FW	9	Griffin Yow		(substituted on) 57'
FW	10	Taylor Booth		(substituted on) 69'
Manager:
(Serbia) Marko Mitrović

Assistant referees:
Mahbod Beigi (Sweden)
Andreas Söderkvist (Sweden)
Fourth official:
Anahí Fernández (Uruguay)
Video assistant referee:
Carlos del Cerro Grande (Spain)
Assistant video assistant referee:
Katalin Kulcsár (Hungary)

=== France vs Guinea ===
27 July 2024
21:00

France	1–0	Guinea
Sildillia 75'	Report

Stade de Nice, Nice
Attendance: 25,965
Referee: Ilgiz Tantashev (Uzbekistan)

France	Guinea

GK	16	Guillaume Restes
RB	5	Kiliann Sildillia
CB	4	Loïc Badé	(yellow card) 45+9'
CB	2	Castello Lukeba
LB	3	Adrien Truffert
DM	6	Manu Koné	(yellow card) 87'
CM	8	Maghnes Akliouche		(substituted off) 59'
CM	13	Joris Chotard
AM	7	Michael Olise
CF	14	Jean-Philippe Mateta		(substituted off) 58'
CF	10	Alexandre Lacazette (c)	(yellow card) 49'	(substituted off) 87'
Substitutes:
GK	1	Obed Nkambadio
DF	15	Bradley Locko
DF	17	Soungoutou Magassa
MF	11	Désiré Doué		(substituted on) 87'
MF	12	Enzo Millot		(substituted on) 59'
FW	9	Arnaud Kalimuendo		(substituted on) 58'
FW	18	Rayan Cherki
Manager:
Thierry Henry

GK	1	Soumaïla Sylla
CB	3	Bangaly Cissé
CB	4	Mohamed Soumah
CB	13	Madiou Keita
RM	7	Aliou Baldé
CM	17	Abdoulaye Touré		(substituted off) 90+4'
CM	6	Amadou Diawara
LM	14	Amadou Diallo
RF	8	Naby Keïta (c)	(yellow card) 74'	(substituted off) 77'
CF	12	Algassime Bah		(substituted off) 90+4'
LF	10	Ilaix Moriba		(substituted off) 84'
Substitutes:
GK	16	Mory Keita
DF	2	Naby Oularé		(substituted on) 77'
DF	20	Chérif Camara
FW	9	Henry Camara		(substituted on) 90+4'
MF	15	Issiaga Camara		(substituted on) 90+4'
FW	11	Ousmane Camara		(substituted on) 84'
Manager:
Kaba Diawara

Assistant referees:
Andrey Tsapenko (Uzbekistan)
Timur Gaynullin (Uzbekistan)
Fourth official:
Veronika Bernatskaia (Kyrgyzstan)
Video assistant referee:
Ovidiu Hațegan (Romania)
Assistant video assistant referee:
Mahmoud Ashour (Egypt)

=== New Zealand vs France ===
30 July 2024
19:00

New Zealand	0–3	France
	Report	Mateta 19'; Doué 71'; Kalimuendo 74'

Stade de Marseille, Marseille
Attendance: 45,790
Referee: Katia García (Mexico)

New Zealand	France

GK	1	Alex Paulsen
RB	2	Michael Boxall
CB	5	Finn Surman		(substituted off) 78'
CB	4	Tyler Bindon
LB	13	Lukas Kelly-Heald	(yellow card) 63'
CM	6	Joe Bell
CM	7	Matthew Garbett (c)
RW	18	Oskar van Hattum		(substituted off) 46'
AM	10	Sarpreet Singh		(substituted off) 90+1'
LW	3	Sam Sutton		(substituted off) 78'
CF	9	Ben Waine		(substituted off) 85'
Substitutes:
GK	12	Kees Sims
DF	15	Matthew Sheridan		(substituted on) 78'
MF	16	Fin Conchie		(substituted on) 85'
MF	17	Lachlan Bayliss		(substituted on) 46'
FW	11	Jesse Randall
FW	14	Jay Herdman		(substituted on) 78'
FW	19	Liam Gillion		(substituted on) 90+1'
Manager:
(United Kingdom) Darren Bazeley

GK	1	Obed Nkambadio
CB	17	Soungoutou Magassa
CB	2	Castello Lukeba	(substituted off) 78'
CB	19	Chrislain Matsima
RM	11	Désiré Doué	(substituted off) 78'
CM	20	Andy Diouf
CM	21	Johann Lepenant
LM	15	Bradley Locko
RF	18	Rayan Cherki	(substituted off) 65'
CF	14	Jean-Philippe Mateta (c)	(substituted off) 66'
LF	9	Arnaud Kalimuendo
Substitutes:
GK	16	Guillaume Restes
DF	3	Adrien Truffert
DF	4	Loïc Badé	(substituted on) 78'
MF	8	Maghnes Akliouche	(substituted on) 66'
MF	13	Joris Chotard	(substituted on) 78'
FW	7	Michael Olise	(substituted on) 65'
FW	10	Alexandre Lacazette
Manager:
Thierry Henry

Assistant referees:
Sandra Ramírez (Mexico)
Karen Díaz (Mexico)
Fourth official:
Anahí Fernández (Uruguay)
Video assistant referee:
Carlos del Cerro Grande (Spain)
Assistant video assistant referee:
Sivakorn Pu-udom (Thailand)

=== United States vs Guinea ===
30 July 2024
19:00

United States	3–0	Guinea
Mihailovic 14'; Paredes 31', 75'	Report

Stade Geoffroy-Guichard, Saint-Étienne
Attendance: 6,245
Referee: Tess Olofsson (Sweden)

United States	Guinea

GK	1	Patrick Schulte
RB	2	Nathan Harriel
CB	12	Miles Robinson
CB	3	Walker Zimmerman
LB	5	John Tolkin
DM	4	Maximilian Dietz	(yellow card) 36'	(substituted off) 52'
CM	8	Tanner Tessmann (c)
CM	14	Djordje Mihailovic		(substituted off) 52'
RF	7	Kevin Paredes		(substituted off) 78'
CF	11	Paxten Aaronson		(substituted off) 66'
LF	9	Griffin Yow		(substituted off) 66'
Substitutes:
GK	18	Gabriel Slonina
DF	17	Caleb Wiley		(substituted on) 78'
MF	15	Benjamin Cremaschi
MF	16	Jack McGlynn		(substituted on) 52'
MF	21	Josh Atencio		(substituted on) 52'
FW	10	Taylor Booth		(substituted on) 66'
FW	13	Duncan McGuire		(substituted on) 66'
Manager:
(Serbia) Marko Mitrović

GK	1	Soumaïla Sylla		(substituted off) 46'
CB	3	Bangaly Cissé		(substituted off) 28'
CB	4	Mohamed Soumah
CB	13	Madiou Keita
RM	7	Aliou Baldé
CM	17	Abdoulaye Touré
CM	6	Amadou Diawara (c)		(substituted off) 63'
LM	14	Amadou Diallo		(substituted off) 85'
RF	11	Ousmane Camara	(yellow card) 38'
CF	12	Algassime Bah		(substituted off) 63'
LF	10	Ilaix Moriba
Substitutes:
DF	2	Naby Oularé		(substituted on) 28'
GK	16	Mory Keita		(substituted on) 46'
FW	9	Henry Camara		(substituted on) 63'
MF	15	Issiaga Camara		(substituted on) 63'
DF	20	Chérif Camara		(substituted on) 85'
Manager:
Kaba Diawara

Assistant referees:
Almira Spahić (Sweden)
Francesca Di Monte (Italy)
Fourth official:
Frida Klarlund (Denmark)
Video assistant referee:
Paolo Valeri (Italy)
Assistant video assistant referee:
Kate Jacewicz (Australia)

== Discipline ==
Fair play points would have been used as a tiebreaker if the overall and head-to-head records of teams were tied. These were calculated based on yellow and red cards received in all group matches as follows:

- first yellow card: minus 1 point;
- indirect red card (second yellow card): minus 3 points;
- direct red card: minus 4 points;
- yellow card and direct red card: minus 5 points;

Only one of the above deductions could be applied to a player in a single match.

Team	Match 1				Match 2				Match 3				Points
Team	Booked	(yellow card) (yellow-red card)	Sent off (straight red)	(yellow card) (red card)	Booked	(yellow card) (yellow-red card)	Sent off (straight red)	(yellow card) (red card)	Booked	(yellow card) (yellow-red card)	Sent off (straight red)	(yellow card) (red card)	Points
France	1												–1
Guinea	1								1				–2
United States	1				1				1				–3
New Zealand	1				1				1				–3
