= Soumaila =

Soumaila is a given name. Notable people with the name include:

- Soumaïla Cissé (born 1949), Malian politician
- Soumaila Coulibaly (born 1978), Malian footballer
- Soumaila Diakite (born 1984), Malian footballer
- Soumaila Samake (born 1978), Malian basketball player
- Soumaila Tassembedo (born 1983), Burkinabé footballer
- Soumaïla Sylla (born 2004), Guinean footballer
