= Football at the 2024 Summer Olympics – Men's qualification =

A total of 16 teams compete in the men's football tournament at the 2024 Summer Olympics. In addition to the host nation France, 15 men's national under-23 teams qualified from the tournaments of the six continental confederations.

== Table ==
On 24 February 2022, the FIFA Council approved the slot allocation for the 2024 Summer Olympics. The host nation France earned automatic qualification to the tournament. For the remaining 15 slots, the AFC and CAF each received 3 automatic slots with a 4th nation from each confederation being granted a spot against each other, UEFA received 3 slots, CONCACAF and CONMEBOL received 2 slots each, and the OFC received 1 slot.

Means of qualification	Date(s) (Note: Dates and venues are those of final tournaments (or final round of qualification tournaments); various qualification stages may precede these matches.)	Venue(s)	Berth(s)	Qualified
Host nation	—N/a	—N/a	1	France
2022 CONCACAF U-20 Championship	18 June – 3 July 2022	Honduras	2	United States; Dominican Republic
2023 UEFA European Under-21 Championship	21 June – 8 July 2023	Georgia; Romania	3	Spain; Israel; Ukraine
2023 U-23 Africa Cup of Nations	24 June – 8 July 2023	Morocco	3	Morocco; Egypt; Mali
2023 OFC Olympic Qualifying Tournament	27 August – 9 September 2023	New Zealand	1	New Zealand
2024 CONMEBOL Pre-Olympic Tournament	20 January – 11 February 2024	Venezuela	2	Paraguay; Argentina
2024 AFC U-23 Asian Cup	15 April – 3 May 2024	Qatar	3	Japan; Uzbekistan; Iraq
AFC–CAF play-off	9 May 2024	France	1	Guinea
Total			16	

== 2022 CONCACAF U-20 Championship ==
The semi-final winners qualified.

=== Knockout stage ===
Round of 16
25 June – Tegucigalpa
United States	5
Nicaragua	0
25 June – San Pedro Sula (Yankel R.)
Costa Rica	4
Trinidad and Tobago	1
25 June – Tegucigalpa
Cuba	0
Panama	1
25 June – San Pedro Sula (Yankel R.)
Honduras	4
Curaçao	1
26 June – Tegucigalpa
El Salvador	4
Dominican Republic	5
26 June – San Pedro Sula (Olímpico M.)
Haiti	1
Jamaica	2
26 June – Tegucigalpa
Guatemala (p)	1 (4)
Canada	1 (3)
26 June – San Pedro Sula (Olímpico M.)
Mexico	6
Puerto Rico	0

Quarter-finals
28 June – San Pedro Sula (Francisco M.)
United States	2
Costa Rica	0
28 June – San Pedro Sula (Francisco M.)
Panama	1
Honduras	2
29 June – San Pedro Sula (Olímpico M.)
Dominican Republic	1
Jamaica	0
29 June – San Pedro Sula (Olímpico M.)
Guatemala (p)	1 (2)
Mexico	1 (1)

Semi-finals
1 July – San Pedro Sula (Francisco M.)
United States	3
Honduras	0
1 July – San Pedro Sula (Francisco M.)
Dominican Republic (p)	2 (4)
Guatemala	2 (2)

Final
3 July – San Pedro Sula (Olímpico M.)
United States	6
Dominican Republic	0

== 2023 UEFA European Under-21 Championship ==
The top three eligible teams (not including England and Olympic hosts France) qualified.
England would have qualified as winners of the 2023 UEFA European Under-21 Championship. However, an English team cannot participate in Olympic qualification for Great Britain due to there being no agreements between the associations of England, Northern Ireland, Scotland and Wales.

=== Knockout stage ===
Quarter-finals
1 July – Boris Paichadze Stadium
Georgia	0 (3)
Israel (p)	0 (4)
2 July – Ramaz Shengelia Stadium
England	1
Portugal	0
1 July – Stadionul Rapid-Giulești
Spain (a.e.t.)	2
Switzerland	1
2 July – Cluj Arena
France	1
Ukraine	3

Semi-finals
5 July – Adjarabet Arena
Israel	0
England	3
5 July – Stadionul Steaua
Spain	5
Ukraine	1

Final
8 July – Adjarabet Arena
England	1
Spain	0

== 2023 U-23 Africa Cup of Nations ==
The winners and runners-up of each group advanced to the knockout stage. The winners of the semi-finals and the third-place match qualified for the 2024 Summer Olympics. The loser of the third-place match advanced to the AFC–CAF play-off match.

=== Knockout stage ===
Semi-finals
4 July – Rabat
Morocco (p)	2 (4)
Mali	2 (3)
4 July – Tangier
Egypt	1
Guinea	0

Final
8 July – Rabat
Morocco (a.e.t.)	2
Egypt	1
Third-place match
7 July – Tangier
Mali (p)	0 (4)
Guinea	0 (3)

== 2023 OFC Men's Olympic qualifying tournament ==
New Zealand qualified after defeating Fiji in the final.

=== Knockout stage ===
Semi-finals
6 September – Auckland
New Zealand	8
Vanuatu	0
6 September – Auckland
Solomon Islands	0
Fiji	3

Final
9 September – Auckland
New Zealand	9
Fiji	0

== 2024 CONMEBOL Pre-Olympic Tournament ==
Teams were drawn into two groups of five teams each and played a single round-robin stage. The winners and runners-up of each group advanced to a final single round-robin stage, with the top two teams qualifying for the Olympics. All ten nations entered the competition.

=== Group stage ===
Group A

Pos	Team	Pld	Pts
1	Brazil	4	9
2	Venezuela (H)	4	8
3	Ecuador	4	7
4	Bolivia	4	4
5	Colombia	4	0

Source: CONMEBOL
(H) Hosts
Group B

Pos	Team	Pld	Pts
1	Argentina	4	8
2	Paraguay	4	7
3	Chile	4	6
4	Uruguay	4	4
5	Peru	4	3

Source: CONMEBOL

=== Final stage ===
Pos	Team	Pld	Pts
1	Paraguay (C)	3	7
2	Argentina	3	5
3	Brazil	3	3
4	Venezuela (H)	3	1

Source: CONMEBOL
(C) Champions;
(H) Hosts

== 2024 AFC U-23 Asian Cup ==
Fifteen teams joined the hosts Qatar to play in four groups of single-leg league format matches. The winners and runners-up of each group advanced to the knockout stage, and the winners of the semi-final matches and the third-place match qualified for the 2024 Summer Olympics. The loser of the third-place match advanced to the AFC–CAF play-off match.

=== Knockout stage ===
Quarter-finals
25 April – Al Rayyan (JBHS)
Qatar	2
Japan (a.e.t.)	4
26 April – Al Wakrah
Iraq	1
Vietnam	0
25 April – Doha
South Korea	2 (10)
Indonesia (p)	2 (11)
26 April – Al Rayyan (KIS)
Uzbekistan	2
Saudi Arabia	0

Semi-finals
29 April – Al Rayyan (JBHS)
Japan	2
Iraq	0
29 April – Doha
Indonesia	0
Uzbekistan	2

Final
3 May – Al Rayyan (JBHS)
Japan	1
Uzbekistan	0
Third place play-off
2 May – Doha
Iraq (a.e.t.)	2
Indonesia	1

== AFC–CAF play-off ==
This section shows the match contested between the 4th-placed teams of the qualification tournaments of Asia and Africa, as both confederations had three and one-half spots at the 2024 Olympic Football Tournament in Paris. The play-off was the 4th-placed team from Africa, Guinea, versus the 4th-placed team from Asia, Indonesia. The match was won by Guinea, and thus Indonesia failed to enter the tournament for the first time since the 1956 Summer Olympics.

9 May 2024
15:00 UTC+2

Indonesia	0–1	Guinea
	Report	Moriba 29' (pen.)

INF Clairefontaine, Clairefontaine-en-Yvelines, France
Referee: François Letexier (France)

Guinea advanced to group A of the Olympic men's football tournament.
