= Hamza Alaa =

Egyptian footballer (born 2001)

Hamza Alaa حَمْزَة عَلَاء
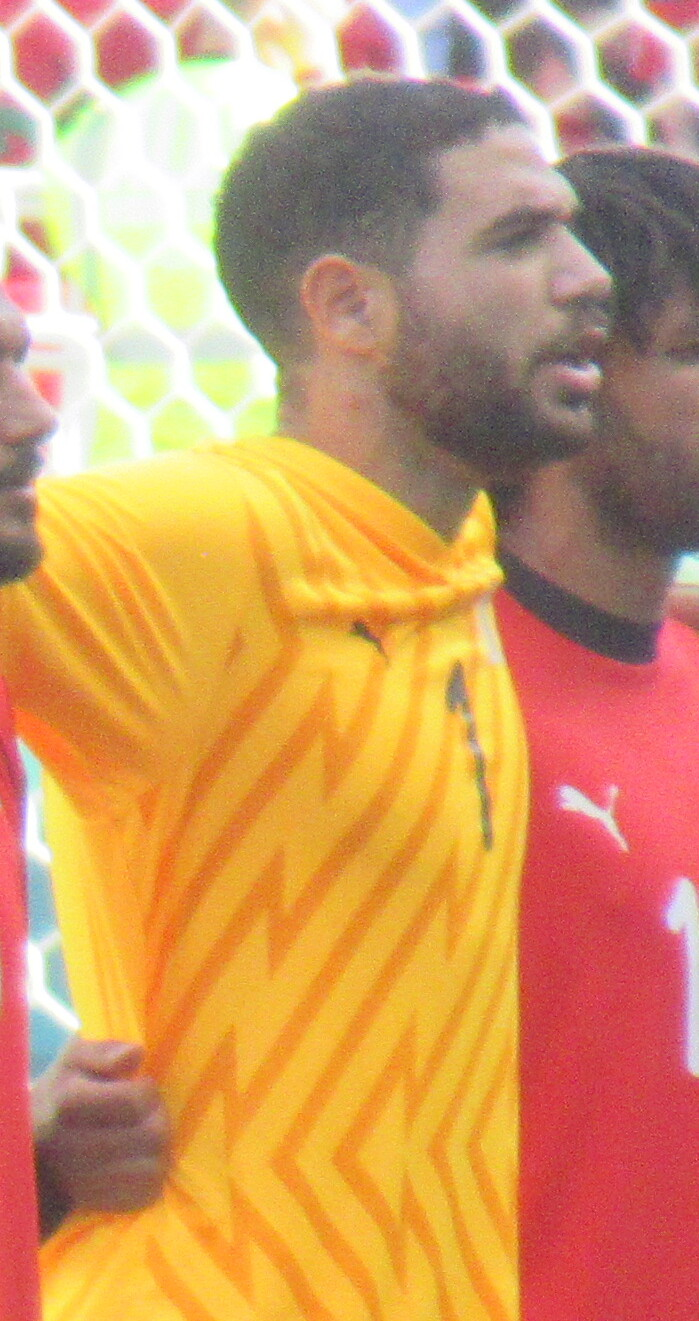
- Hamza lining up for Egypt Olympic at the 2024 Summer Olympics

Personal information
- Full name: Hamza Alaa Abdallah Hussein
- Date of birth: 1 March 2001 (age 25)
- Place of birth: Cairo, Egypt
- Height: 1.89 m (6 ft 2 in)
- Position: Goalkeeper

Team information
- Current team: Al Ahly
- Number: 16

Youth career
- 2008–2020: Al Ahly

Senior career*
Years	Team	Apps	(Gls)
2020–2025	Al Ahly	1	(0)
2025	Portimonense	0	(0)
2025—	Al Ahly	0	(0)

International career^{‡}
2020–2021	Egypt U20	1	(0)
2022–2024	Egypt U23	11	(0)
2024–	Egypt	0	(0)
Medal record
Representing Egypt
U-23 Africa Cup of Nations
Runner-up	Morocco 2023	U-23 Team
- * Club domestic league appearances and goals as of 02:21, 28 November 2025 (UTC) ‡ National team caps and goals as of 23:14, 10 January 2024 (UTC)

Hamza Alaa Abdallah Hussein (Arabic: حَمْزَة عَلَاء عَبْد الله حُسَيْن; born 1 March 2001) is an Egyptian professional footballer who plays as a goalkeeper for Egyptian Premier League club Al Ahly SC and the Egypt national team.

== Club career ==
=== Al Ahly ===
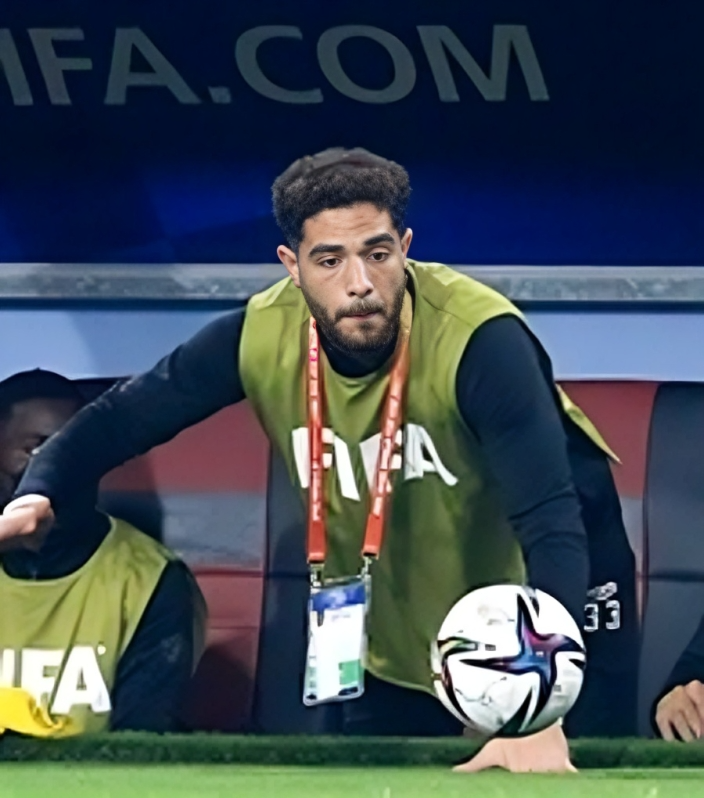
Hamza with Al Ahly in 2021 FIFA Club World Cup.

Hamza was in Al Ahly Youth Team from the beginning of his career. in 2020 He get the First-team call-up for Al Ahly .He Was in Finalist for Al Ahly Squad in FIFA Club World Cup 2020 And won a bronze medal against Palmeiras. Until he made his debut for Al Ahly in 2022 at the Egyptian Premier League against Ceramica Cleopatra as he came as a sub playing for 15 minutes.

== International career ==
=== Youth level ===
He played for the Egypt U23 team in Morocco 2023 when they took the silver medal and he won individually the best goalkeeper in the tournament.

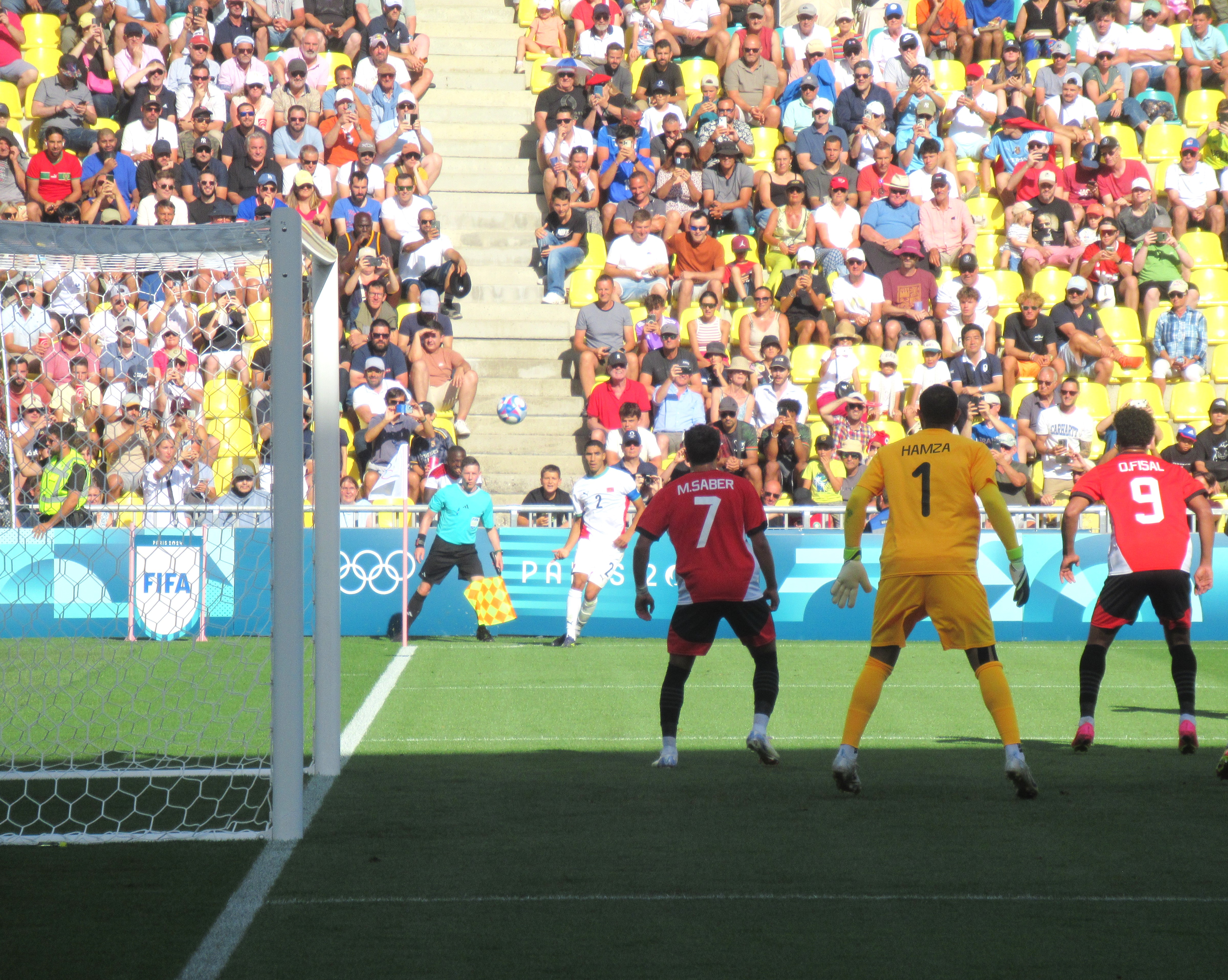
Hamza with Egypt Olympic in 2024 Olympics games against Morocco Olympic

In 2024 he was called up by the Egyptian national Olympic team to participate in the Games of the 2024 Olympics games in Paris When they get the fourth-place.

=== Senior level ===
On 28 August 2024 he got his first National Team Call-Up to become with Egypt squad in September camp.

== Statistics ==
As of 1 November 2024

Club	Season	League			Cup		Continental		Other		Total	
Club	Season	Division	Apps	Goals	Apps	Goals	Apps	Goals	Apps	Goals	Apps	Goals
Al Ahly	2019–20	EPL	0	0	0	0	0	0	0	0	0	0
Al Ahly	2020–21	EPL	0	0	0	0	0	0	0	0	0	0
Al Ahly	2021–22	EPL	1	0	0	0	0	0	1 (Note: Appearances in the Egyptian League Cup)	0	2	0
Al Ahly	2022–23	EPL	0	0	0	0	0	0	0	0	0	0
Al Ahly	2023–24	EPL	0	0	0	0	0	0	0	0	0	0
Al Ahly	2024–25	EPL	0	0	0	0	0	0	0	0	0	0
Career total			1	0	0	0	0	0	1	0	2	0

== Honours ==
Al Ahly

- Egyptian Premier League: 2022–23
- Egypt Cup: 2021–22, 2022–23
- Egyptian Super Cup: 2023–24
- CAF Champions League: 2022–23, 2023-24
- FIFA African–Asian–Pacific Cup: 2024

Individual

- Best Goalkeeper in Africa Cup of Nations U23: 2023
