= Mohamed Soumah =

Guinean footballer (born 2003)

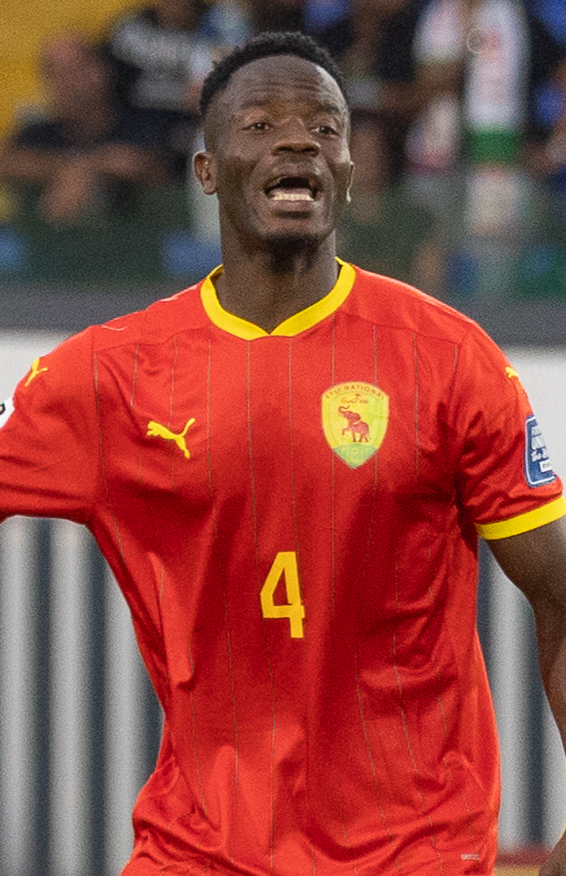
- Soumah in 2025

Personal information
- Date of birth: 15 March 2003 (age 23)
- Place of birth: Conakry, Guinea
- Height: 1.88 m (6 ft 2 in)
- Position: Centre-back

Team information
- Current team: Sirius
- Number: 2

Youth career
- Kaloum

Senior career*
Years	Team	Apps	(Gls)
2022–2023	Kaloum	0	(0)
2022–2023	→ FC Ouest Tourangeau (loan)	1	(0)
2022–2023	→ Avoine OCC (loan)	1	(0)
2023–2024	→ Jong Gent (loan)	24	(1)
2024–	Jong Gent	46	(2)
2025–2026	Gent	2	(0)
2026–	Sirius	8	(2)

International career^{‡}
2023–2024	Guinea U23	11	(2)
2025–	Guinea	9	(2)
- * Club domestic league appearances and goals as of 8 July 2026 ‡ National team caps and goals as of 16 November 2026

Mohamed Soumah (born 15 March 2003) is a Guinean professional footballer who plays as a centre-back for Sirius and the Guinea national team.

== Career ==
Soumah is a product of the academy of the Guinean club Kaloum. He began his career on loan with French club FC Ouest Tourangeau in 2022, and the following year had a loan in the Championnat National 3 with Avoine OCC. On 16 August 2023, he joined Gent on loan where he was assigned to their reserves. On 8 January 2025, he signed a three-year contract with the Gent senior team. He made his debut for Gent in a 3–1 Belgian Pro League loss to Union Saint-Gilloise on 25 May 2025.

On 4 February 2026, Soumah signed a four-and-a-half year contract with Allsvenskan club IK Sirius.

== International career ==
Soumah was called up to the Guinea U23s for the 2024 Olympic Games. He was called up to the Guinea national team for a set of 2026 FIFA World Cup qualification matches in September 2025.

=== International goals ===
As of match played 16 November 2026.

Appearances and goals by national team and year
National team	Year	Apps	Goals
Guinea	2025	3	0
Guinea	2026	6	2
Total		9	2

As of match played 16 November 2026
Scores and results list Guinea's goal tally first, score column indicates score after each Soumah goal

List of international goals scored by Mohamed Soumah
No.	Date	Venue	Opponent	Score	Result	Competition
1	12 November 2026	28 September Stadium, Conakry, Guinea	Eritrea	1–0	2–1	2027 Africa Cup of Nations qualification
2	16 November 2026	Al Salam Stadium, Cairo, Egypt	Eritrea	1–0	3–1	2027 Africa Cup of Nations qualification
