= Issiaga Camara =

Guinean footballer

Personal information
- Date of birth: 2 February 2005 (age 21)
- Place of birth: Conakry, Guinea
- Height: 1.70 m (5 ft 7 in)
- Position: Midfielder

Team information
- Current team: Nice
- Number: 22

Youth career
- –2016: Beaune FC
- 2016–2024: Nice

Senior career*
Years	Team	Apps	(Gls)
2024–	Nice	4	(0)
2025	→ Dijon (loan)	3	(0)
2025–2026	→ Brommapojkarna (loan)	12	(0)

International career^{‡}
2023	Guinea U23	1	(0)
- * Club domestic league appearances and goals as of 31 May 2026 ‡ National team caps and goals as of 22 January 2025

Issiaga Camara (born 2 February 2005) is a Guinean professional footballer who plays as a midfielder for French Ligue 1 club Nice.

== Early life ==
Camara was born in Conakry, Guinea, and moved to France at the age of 11. He began his football journey with amateur clubs, including the clubs of Beaune-la-Rolande, Amilly before joining the youth academy of OGC Nice in 2016.

== Club career ==
Camara progressed through the ranks at OGC Nice, signing his first professional contract with the club in 2024. He made his Ligue 1 debut in the 2024–25 season, appearing against AJ Auxerre. He has also been included in OGC Nice's squads for Europa League and French Cup matches, reflecting his growing importance to the team.

On 31 January 2025, Camara was loaned to Dijon in Championnat National.

On 23 July 2025, Camara was loaned to Swedish Allsvenskan club IF Brommapojkarna on a one-year deal.

== International career ==
Eligible to represent Guinea, Camara has been capped by the Guinea U23 national team. He also represented them during the 2024 Summer Olympics, appearing for them in 2 of the 3 group stage matches.

== Career statistics ==
=== Club ===
As of match played 30 January 2025

Appearances and goals by club, season and competition
Club	Season	League			Cup		Europe		Other		Total	
Club	Season	Division	Apps	Goals	Apps	Goals	Apps	Goals	Apps	Goals	Apps	Goals
Nice	2024–25	Ligue 1	4	0	1	0	2 (Note: Appearances in UEFA Europa League)	0	—		7	0
Career Total			4	0	1	0	2	0	0	0	7	0
