= 2023 U-23 Africa Cup of Nations =

4th edition of U-23 AFCON

كأس الأمم الأفريقية تحت 23 سنة 2023

Tournament details
- Host country: Morocco
- Dates: 24 June – 8 July
- Teams: 8 (from 1 confederation)
- Venues: 2 (in 2 host cities)

Final positions
- Champions: Morocco (1st title)
- Runners-up: Egypt
- Third place: Mali
- Fourth place: Guinea

Tournament statistics
- Matches played: 16
- Goals scored: 39 (2.44 per match)
- Top scorers: (Ghana) Emmanuel Yeboah; (Morocco) Yanis Begraoui; (Morocco) Abde Ezzalzouli; (3 goals each)
- Best player: (Egypt) Ibrahim Adel
- Best goalkeeper: (Egypt) Hamza Alaa
- Fair play award: Guinea

The 2023 U-23 Africa Cup of Nations, known for sponsorship purposes as the TotalEnergies U-23 Africa Cup of Nations, was the 4th edition of the quadrennial African football tournament organized by the Confederation of African Football (CAF) for its male national teams consisting of players under 23 years of age. It was held in Morocco between 24 June and 8 July 2023. It was the second time that Morocco hosted the tournament, as they were the inaugural hosts back in 2011.

The finalists and third-place playoff winner of this edition of the tournament qualified for the 2024 Summer Olympics men's football tournament in Paris while the 4th-placed team will play the AFC–CAF playoff to decide the final Olympic slot.

Egypt were the defending champions, but failed to defend their title after a 2–1 loss to hosts Morocco in the final, although both were guaranteed qualification to the Olympic football tournament alongside Mali who won their third-place match against Guinea, who would later also qualify for the Olympics after emerging victorious in the playoff against the 4th-placed team from Asia, Indonesia. With the win, Morocco repeated the feat achieved at the 2018 African Nations Championship by hosting and winning a tournament at the same time.

== Qualification ==
Morocco qualified automatically as hosts, while the remaining 7 spots were determined by the qualifying rounds which took place on a home-and-away two-legged basis from 21 September 2022 to 28 March 2023.

=== Qualified teams ===
The following teams qualified for the group stage.

| Team | Date of qualification | Appearance | Last appearance | Previous best performance |
|---|---|---|---|---|
| Morocco (hosts) | 7 July 2022 | 2nd | 2011 | Runners-up (2011) |
| Egypt | 26 March 2023 | 4th | 2019 | Champions (2019) |
| Congo | 27 March 2023 | 1st | None | Debut |
| Gabon | 28 March 2023 | 2nd | 2011 | Champions (2011) |
| Ghana | 28 March 2023 | 2nd | 2019 | Fourth place (2019) |
| Guinea | 28 March 2023 | 1st | None | Debut |
| Mali | 28 March 2023 | 3rd | 2019 | Group stage (2015, 2019) |
| Niger | 28 March 2023 | 1st | None | Debut |

== Venues ==
The matches were contested at two venues; the Ibn Batouta Stadium in Tangier and the Prince Moulay Abdellah Stadium in Rabat.

2023 U-23 Africa Cup of Nations is located in Morocco
| Tangier | Rabat |
| Ibn Batouta Stadium | Prince Moulay Abdellah Stadium |
| Capacity: 65,000 | Capacity: 53,000 |

== Draw ==
The draw was held on 5 May 2023 at 17:00 CET (UTC+1) at the Mohammed VI Football Academy in Salé. The 8 teams were drawn into two groups of four teams, with hosts Morocco seeded in Group A (position A1) and the defending champions Egypt seeded in Group B (position B1). The remaining 6 teams were allocated to two pots based on the results of the previous tournament edition and were drawn to the remaining positions.

| Seeded | Pot 1 | Pot 2 |
|---|---|---|
| Morocco (position A1); Egypt (position B1) | Ghana; Mali | Congo; Gabon; Guinea; Niger |

== Match officials ==
Referees

- (Ivory Coast) Clement Franklin Kpan
- (Egypt) Mahmoud Nagy
- (Gabon) Pierre Ghislain Atcho
- (Morocco) Jalal Jayed
- (Somalia) Omar Abdulkadir Artan
- (South Africa) Abongile Tom
- (Senegal) Adalbert Diouf
- (Algeria) Youcef Gamouh
- (Gabon) Patrice Mebiame
- (The Gambia) Lamin Jammeh
- (Libya) Muhammad Elmabrouk

Assistant Referees

- (Kenya) Stephen Yiembe
- (Liberia) Joel Wonka Doe
- (Egypt) Sami Halal
- (Republic of the Congo) Styven Moutsassi
- (Morocco) Abdessamad Abertoune
- (Tunisia) Wael Hannachi
- (Algeria) Adel Abane
- (Togo) Jhonathan Ahonto Koffi
- (Madagascar) Dimbiniaina Andriatianarivelo
- (Mauritania) Youssef Mahmoud
- (Nigeria) Igho Hope
- (Morocco) Hamza Naciri

Video Assistant Referees

- (Mauritius) Maria Rivet
- (Egypt) Mohamed Hussien
- (Mauritania) Dahane Beida
- (Eswatini) Letticia Antonella Wiana
- (Algeria) Mustapha Ghorbal
- (Tunisia) Haytem Guirat
- (Kenya) Peter Waweru
- (Morocco) Adil Zourak

== Group stage ==
The top two teams of each group advanced to the semi-finals.

Tiebreakers

Teams were ranked according to points; 3 for a win, 1 for a draw and none for a loss. If tied on points, the following tiebreaking criteria were applied in the order given to determine the rankings (Regulations Article 68):

1. Points in head-to-head matches among tied teams;
2. Goal difference in head-to-head matches among tied teams;
3. Goals scored in head-to-head matches among tied teams;
4. If more than two teams were tied and after applying all head-to-head criteria above, a subset of teams were still tied, all head-to-head criteria above were reapplied exclusively to this subset of teams;
5. Goal difference in all group matches;
6. Goals scored in all group matches;
7. Drawing of lots.

All times are local, CET (UTC+1).

=== Group A ===
| Pos | Team | Pld | W | D | L | GF | GA | GD | Pts | Qualification |
|---|---|---|---|---|---|---|---|---|---|---|
| 1 | Morocco (H) | 3 | 3 | 0 | 0 | 8 | 2 | +6 | 9 | Advance to knockout stage |
| 2 | Guinea | 3 | 1 | 1 | 1 | 5 | 4 | +1 | 4 | Advance to knockout stage |
| 3 | Ghana | 3 | 1 | 1 | 1 | 5 | 8 | −3 | 4 | |
| 4 | Congo | 3 | 0 | 0 | 3 | 3 | 7 | −4 | 0 | |

Source: Soccer24
Rules for classification: Group stage tiebreakers
(H) Hosts
24 June 2023
21:00

| Morocco | 2–1 | Guinea |
|---|---|---|
| Ezzalzouli 68' (pen.), 90+8' (pen.) | Report | Bah 45+2' |

Prince Moulay Abdellah Stadium, Rabat
Referee: Omar Abdulkadir Artan (Somalia)
25 June 2023
16:00

| Ghana | 3–2 | Congo |
|---|---|---|
| Nuamah 50'; Yeboah 75', 83' (pen.) | Report | R.T. Kokolo 90+3'; Y. Ngatse 90+4' |

Prince Moulay Abdellah Stadium, Rabat
Referee: Mahmoud Nagi (Egypt)

27 June 2023
18:00

| Congo | 1–3 | Guinea |
|---|---|---|
| Y. Ngatse 40' | Report | Camara 10'; J. Bowamba 54' (o.g.); S. Soumah 84' |

Prince Moulay Abdellah Stadium, Rabat
Referee: Clement Franklin Kpan (Ivory Coast)
27 June 2023
21:00

| Morocco | 5–1 | Ghana |
|---|---|---|
| Richardson 7'; Saibari 13'; Begraoui 30', 53'; Ezzalzouli 48' | Report | S. Adams 43' |

Prince Moulay Abdellah Stadium, Rabat
Referee: Patrice Mebiame (Gabon)

30 June 2023
21:00

| Congo | 0–1 | Morocco |
|---|---|---|
| | Report | Taha 7' |

Prince Moulay Abdellah Stadium, Rabat
Referee: Mahmoud Nagi (Egypt)
30 June 2023
21:00

| Guinea | 1–1 | Ghana |
|---|---|---|
| Fofana 61' | Report | Yeboah 33' |

Ibn Batouta Stadium, Tangier
Referee: Muhammad Elmabrouk (Libya)

=== Group B ===
| Pos | Team | Pld | W | D | L | GF | GA | GD | Pts | Qualification |
|---|---|---|---|---|---|---|---|---|---|---|
| 1 | Egypt | 3 | 2 | 1 | 0 | 3 | 0 | +3 | 7 | Advance to knockout stage |
| 2 | Mali | 3 | 2 | 0 | 1 | 5 | 2 | +3 | 6 | Advance to knockout stage |
| 3 | Niger | 3 | 1 | 1 | 1 | 1 | 2 | −1 | 4 | |
| 4 | Gabon | 3 | 0 | 0 | 3 | 1 | 6 | −5 | 0 | |

Source: Soccer24
Rules for classification: Group stage tiebreakers
25 June 2023
18:00

| Egypt | 0–0 | Niger |
|---|---|---|
| | Report |

Ibn Batouta Stadium, Tangier
Referee: Adalbert Diouf (Senegal)
25 June 2023
21:00

| Mali | 3–1 | Gabon |
|---|---|---|
| Sangare 20' (pen.); C. Doumbia 41'; A. Tamboura 90+2' | Report | Ovono 3' (pen.) |

Ibn Batouta Stadium, Tangier
Referee: Jalal Jayed (Morocco)

28 June 2023
18:00

| Egypt | 1–0 | Mali |
|---|---|---|
| Adel 10' | Report |

Ibn Batouta Stadium, Tangier
Referee: Lamin Jammeh (Gambia)
28 June 2023
21:00

| Gabon | 0–1 | Niger |
|---|---|---|
| | Report | Moumouni 60' (pen.) |

Ibn Batouta Stadium, Tangier
Referee: Youcef Gamouh (Algeria)

1 July 2023
21:00

| Gabon | 0–2 | Egypt |
|---|---|---|
| | Report | M. Saber 82'; Faisal 90+2' (pen.) |

Ibn Batouta Stadium, Tangier
Referee: Omar Abdulkadir Artan (Somalia)
1 July 2023
21:00

| Niger | 0–2 | Mali |
|---|---|---|
| | Report | Sangare 49' (pen.); C. Doumbia 90' |

Prince Moulay Abdellah Stadium, Rabat
Referee: Abongile Tom (South Africa)

== Knockout stage ==
=== Bracket ===
Semi-finals
4 July – Rabat
Morocco (p) | 2 (4)
Mali | 2 (3)
4 July – Tangier
Egypt | 1
Guinea | 0

Final
8 July – Rabat
Morocco (a.e.t.) | 2
Egypt | 1
Third-place match
7 July – Tangier
Mali (p) | 0 (4)
Guinea | 0 (3)

=== Semi-finals ===
The winners qualified for the 2024 Summer Olympics.

4 July 2023
21:00

| Morocco | 2–2 (a.e.t.) | Mali |
|---|---|---|
| El Ouahdi 14'; El Ouazzani 111' | Report | Diambou 66'; I. Maïga 116' |
Penalties
| Targhalline (penalty scored); El Ouazzani (penalty scored); Taha (penalty scored); Ezzalzouli (penalty scored) | 4–3 | (penalty missed) Traoré; (penalty scored) Diambou; (penalty scored) H. Diallo; (penalty scored) M.L. Bah; (penalty missed) A. Diomandé |

Prince Moulay Abdellah Stadium, Rabat
Referee: Pierre Ghislain Atcho (Gabon)

4 July 2023
18:00

| Egypt | 1–0 | Guinea |
|---|---|---|
| Shehata 8' | Report |

Ibn Batouta Stadium, Tangier
Referee: Abongile Tom (South Africa)

=== Third-place match ===
The winner (Mali) joined the finalists in qualifying for the 2024 Summer Olympics and the loser (Guinea) will play in the AFC–CAF play-off.

7 July 2023
18:00

| Mali | 0–0 | Guinea |
|---|---|---|
| | Report |
Penalties
| I. Maïga (penalty missed); Diambou (penalty scored); Diallo (penalty scored); Diomandé (penalty scored); M.L. Bah (penalty scored) | 4–3 | (penalty scored) F. Camara; (penalty missed) A. Camara; (penalty scored) M.L. Soumah; (penalty scored) O. Camara; (penalty missed) Cissé |

Ibn Batouta Stadium, Tangier
Referee: Youcef Gamouh (Algeria)

=== Final ===
8 July 2023
21:00

| Morocco | 2–1 (a.e.t.) | Egypt |
|---|---|---|
| Begraoui 37'; Targhalline 105+3' | Report | Saber 10' |

Prince Moulay Abdellah Stadium, Rabat
Referee: Peter Waweru (Kenya)

== Winners ==
2023 U-23 Africa Cup of Nations champions

Morocco
First title

== Final ranking ==
As per statistical convention in football, matches decided in extra time are counted as wins and losses, while matches decided by penalty shoot-outs are counted as draws.

| Pos | Team | Pld | W | D | L | GF | GA | GD | Pts | Final result |
|---|---|---|---|---|---|---|---|---|---|---|
| 1st place, gold medalist(s) | Morocco (H) | 5 | 4 | 1 | 0 | 12 | 5 | +7 | 13 | Champions |
| 2nd place, silver medalist(s) | Egypt | 5 | 3 | 1 | 1 | 5 | 2 | +3 | 10 | Runners-up |
| 3rd place, bronze medalist(s) | Mali | 5 | 2 | 2 | 1 | 7 | 4 | +3 | 8 | Third place |
| 4 | Guinea | 5 | 1 | 2 | 2 | 5 | 5 | 0 | 5 | Fourth place |
| 5 | Niger | 3 | 1 | 1 | 1 | 1 | 2 | −1 | 4 | Eliminated in Group stage |
| 6 | Ghana | 3 | 1 | 1 | 1 | 5 | 8 | −3 | 4 | Eliminated in Group stage |
| 7 | Congo | 3 | 0 | 0 | 3 | 3 | 7 | −4 | 0 | Eliminated in Group stage |
| 8 | Gabon | 3 | 0 | 0 | 3 | 1 | 6 | −5 | 0 | Eliminated in Group stage |

Source: CAF
(H) Hosts

== Awards ==
The following awards were given at the conclusion of this edition of the tournament:

| Top Scorer | Best Player | Best Goalkeeper | Fair Play Award |
|---|---|---|---|
| (Morocco) Abde Ezzalzouli (3 goals, 3 assists) | (Egypt) Ibrahim Adel | (Egypt) Hamza Alaa | Guinea |

=== Team of the tournament ===
The team of the tournament was announced by the CAF after the final.

| Goalkeeper | Defenders | Midfielders | Forwards |
|---|---|---|---|
| (Egypt) Hamza Alaa | (Mali) Ibrahima Cisse (Mali) Fodé Doucouré (Egypt) Hossam Abdelmaguid (Morocco) Zakaria El Ouahdi | (Mali) Mamadou Sangare (Egypt) Amar Hamdy (Morocco) Ismael Saibari | (Egypt) Ibrahim Adel (Egypt) Osama Faisal (Morocco) Abde Ezzalzouli |

== Goalscorers ==
There were 39 goals scored in 16 matches, for an average of 2.44 goals per match.

3 goals

- (Ghana) Emmanuel Yeboah
- (Morocco) Yanis Begraoui
- (Morocco) Abde Ezzalzouli

2 goals

- (Republic of the Congo) Yann Ngatse
- (Egypt) Mahmoud Saber
- (Mali) Cheickna Doumbia
- (Mali) Mamadou Sangare

1 goal

- (Republic of the Congo) Reich Triomphe Kokolo
- (Egypt) Ibrahim Adel
- (Egypt) Osama Faisal
- (Egypt) Mohamed Shehata Mahmoud
- (Gabon) Emmanuel Ovono
- (Ghana) Salim Adams
- (Ghana) Ernest Nuamah
- (Guinea) Algassime Bah
- (Guinea) Aguibou Camara
- (Guinea) Ibrahima Breze Fofana
- (Guinea) Salifou Soumah
- (Mali) Mamady Diambou
- (Mali) Issoufi Maïga
- (Mali) Alhassane Tamboura
- (Morocco) Zakaria El Ouahdi
- (Morocco) Amine El Ouazzani
- (Morocco) Amir Richardson
- (Morocco) Ismael Saibari
- (Morocco) Younes Taha
- (Morocco) Oussama Targhalline
- (Niger) Abdoul Moumouni

1 own goal

- (Republic of the Congo) Jacques Bowamba (against Guinea)

== Qualified teams for the 2024 Summer Olympics ==
The following four teams from CAF qualified for the 2024 Summer Olympic men's football tournament in France.

| Team | Qualified on | Previous appearances at the Summer Olympics |
|---|---|---|
| Morocco | 4 July 2023 | 7 (1964, 1972, 1984, 1992, 2000, 2004, 2012) |
| Egypt | 4 July 2023 | 12 (1920, 1924, 1928, 1936, 1948, 1952, 1960, 1964, 1984, 1992, 2012, 2020) |
| Mali | 7 July 2023 | 1 (2004) |
| Guinea | 9 May 2024 | 1 (1968) |
