= Madiou Keita =

Guinean footballer (born 2004)

Personal information
- Full name: Haladj Madiou Keita
- Date of birth: 29 August 2004 (age 22)
- Place of birth: Amilly, France
- Height: 1.84 m (6 ft 0 in)
- Positions: Centre-back; left-back

Team information
- Current team: Västerås SK
- Number: 28

Youth career
- –2021: Angers
- 2021–2023: Auxerre

Senior career*
Years	Team	Apps	(Gls)
2023–2025	Auxerre II	38	(0)
2025	→ Örgryte (loan)	9	(1)
2025–2026	RWDM Brussels	14	(0)
2026–	Västerås SK	0	(0)

International career^{‡}
2023–2024	Guinea U23	10	(0)
2025–	Guinea	1	(0)
- * Club domestic league appearances and goals as of 8 July 2026 ‡ National team caps and goals as of 15 November 2025

Haladj Madiou Keita (born 29 August 2004) is a professional footballer who plays as a centre-back or left-back for Allsvenskan club Västerås SK. Born in France, he represents Guinea internationally.

== Club career ==
Keita was a youth product of Angers. In 2021, he joined the youth team of Auxerre. In February 2023e made his debut with Auxerre's reserves side. On 18 November 2023, he made his debut with senior's side in a Coupe de France victory against Pays du Valois, playing full 90 minutes.

On 14 February 2025, Keita was loaned out to Superettan club Örgryte IS on deal until 30 June 2025.

On 3 June 2026, Keita signed a three-year contract with Allsvenskan club Västerås SK.

== International career ==
In August 2023, Keita received his first call up to the Guinea national team for the friendly game against Malawi. In July 2024, he was named in Guinea Olympic team's squad for the Paris Olympics. He appeared in all 3 group stage games for Mali as the team failed to qualify to the next stage.

Keita made his debut for the senior Guinea national team on 15 November 2025 in a friendly against Liberia.

== Style of play ==
As a defender with good passing ability, Keita can operate as a centre-back and left-back.
