= Allianz Riviera =

Multi-use stadium in Nice, France

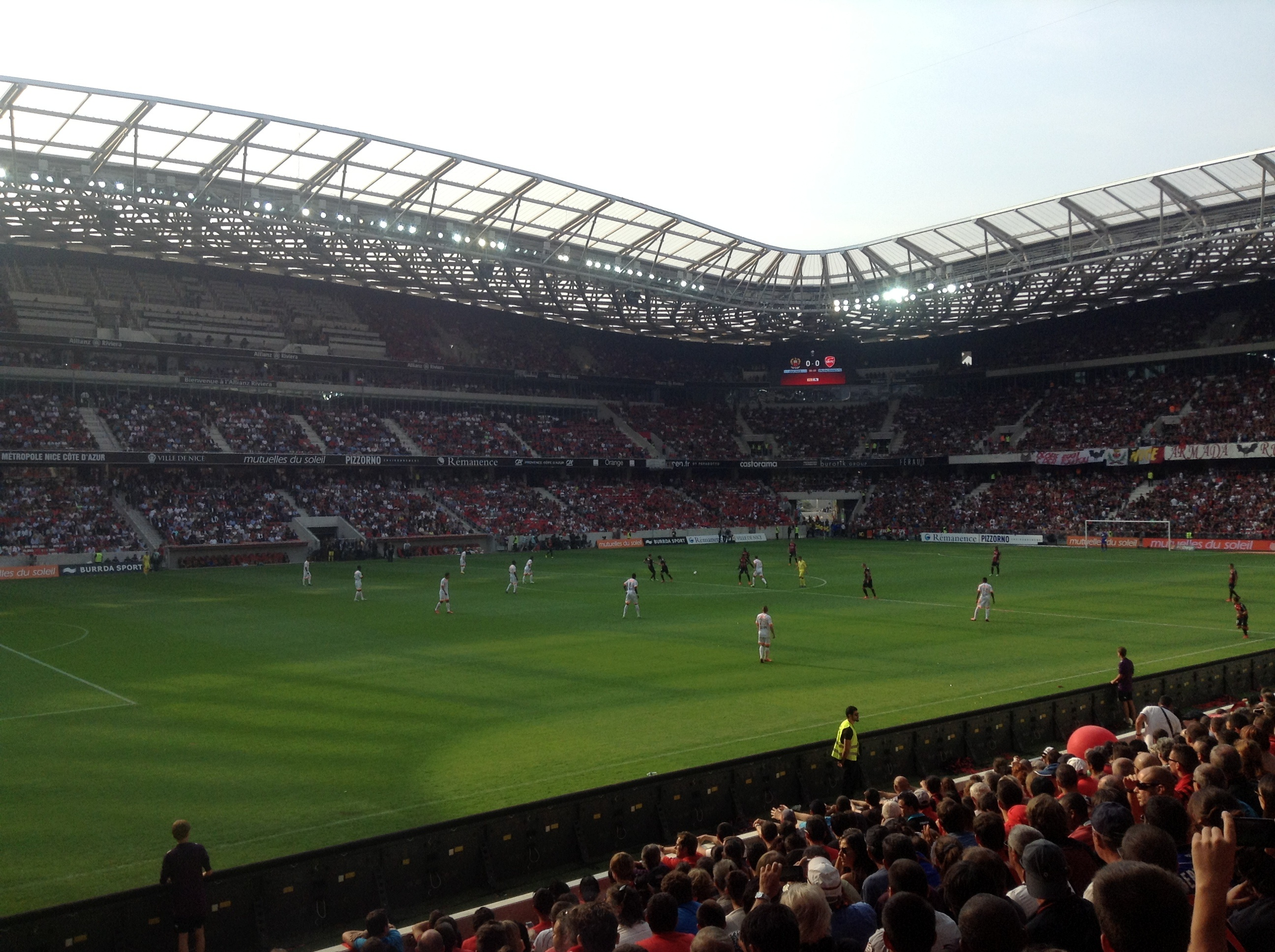
- UEFA
- Interactive map of Allianz Riviera
- Location: Rue Jules Bianchi, Saint-Isidore, Nice, France
- Coordinates: 43°42′19″N 7°11′33″E
- Owner: City of Nice
- Capacity: 36,178 (Football); 35,169 (Rugby); 44,624 (Concerts)
- Type: Stadium
- Surface: Grass
- Record attendance: 35,596 (OGC Nice vs AS Saint-Étienne, 7 May 2016)
- Field size: 131 × 73 m
- Field shape: Rectangular
- Public transit: Lines T2 and T3, Nice tramway Route 59, Ligne d'Azur; Nice-Saint-Augustin station Nice Côte d'Azur Airport

Construction
- Groundbreaking: July 2011
- Opened: September 2013
- Cost: €250,000,000
- Architect: Jean-Michel Wilmotte

Tenants
- OGC Nice (2013–present); RC Toulon (selected matches); France national football team (selected matches)

Website
- www.allianz-riviera.fr/en

Allianz Riviera (also known as Grand Stade de Nice and Stade de Nice due to UEFA, FIFA, and IOC sponsorship regulations) is a multi-use stadium in Nice, France, mostly used for football matches of host OGC Nice and occasionally for home matches of rugby union club Toulon. The stadium has a capacity of 36,178 people and replaced the city's former stadium Stade Municipal du Ray. Construction started in 2011 and was completed in two years. The stadium opened on 22 September 2013 with a match between OGC Nice and Valenciennes.

The stadium was originally planned to be built by 2007. However, construction was halted the previous year because of concerns related to the future cost of the structure. Plans for the stadium, located in Saint-Isidore near the Var, were then shelved. The project was revived as part of France's ultimately successful bid to host UEFA Euro 2016. The stadium hosted six matches at the 2019 FIFA Women's World Cup and six matches at the 2024 Paris Olympic Games.

The stadium is bordered on its east by a short shopping street. Access for away fans as of 30 January 2025 is on the northwest on the bottom floor, on the north end of the west parking square.

Stadium exterior

== Tournament results ==
=== UEFA Euro 2016 ===
The stadium was one of the venues of the UEFA Euro 2016 and hosted the following matches:

Date	Time (CET)	Team #1	Result	Team #2	Round	Attendance
12 June 2016	18:00	Poland	1–0	Northern Ireland	Group C	33,742
17 June 2016	21:00	Spain	3–0	Turkey	Group D	33,409
22 June 2016	21:00	Sweden	0–1	Belgium	Group E	34,011
27 June 2016	21:00	England	1–2	Iceland	Round of 16	33,901

=== 2019 FIFA Women's World Cup ===
The stadium was one of the venues of the 2019 FIFA Women's World Cup. It hosted 4 group games, one round of 16 match, and the third-place playoff. These were the matches it hosted:

Date	Time (CEST)	Team #1	Result	Team #2	Round	Attendance
9 June 2019	18:00	England	2–1	Scotland	Group D	13,188
12 June 2019	21:00	France	2–1	Norway	Group A	34,872
16 June 2019	15:00	Sweden	5–1	Thailand	Group F	9,354
19 June 2019	21:00	Japan	0–2	England	Group D	14,319
22 June 2019	21:00	Norway	1–1 (4–1 p)	Australia	Round of 16	12,229
6 July 2019	17:00	England	1–2	Sweden	Third place play-off	20,316

=== 2023 Rugby World Cup ===
The stadium was one of the venues of the 2023 Rugby World Cup:

Date	Time (CET)	Team #1	Result	Team #2	Round	Attendance
16 September 2023	17:45	Wales	28–8	Portugal	Pool C	28,700
17 September 2023	21:00	England	34–12	Japan	Pool D	30,500
20 September 2023	17:45	Italy	38–17	Uruguay	Pool A	28,627
24 September 2023	17:45	Scotland	45–17	Tonga	Pool B	33,189

=== 2024 Summer Olympics ===
Date	Team #1	Result	Team #2	Round	Attendance
24 July 2024	Guinea	1–2	New Zealand	Men's group A	4,909
25 July 2024	United States	3–0	Zambia	Women's group B	5,550
27 July 2024	France	1–0	Guinea	Men's group A	25,965
28 July 2024	Australia	6–5	Zambia	Women's group B	4,441
30 July 2024	Morocco	3–0	Iraq	Men's group B	19,300
31 July 2024	Colombia	0–1	Canada	Women's group A	5,388

== Concerts ==
Concerts at Allianz Riviera
Date	Artist	Tour	Attendance
20 July 2017	Celine Dion	Celine Dion Live 2017	30,270
17 July 2018	Beyoncé; Jay-Z	On the Run II Tour	33,662
22 July 2023	The Weeknd	After Hours til Dawn Tour	34,310
23 July 2023	The Weeknd	After Hours til Dawn Tour	35,690
29 July 2023	Mylène Farmer	Nevermore 2023/2024	35,563
6 July 2024	Travis Scott	Circus Maximus Tour	34,169
21 July 2026	The Weeknd	After Hours til Dawn Tour	
