= Yanis Begraoui =

Moroccan footballer (born 2001)

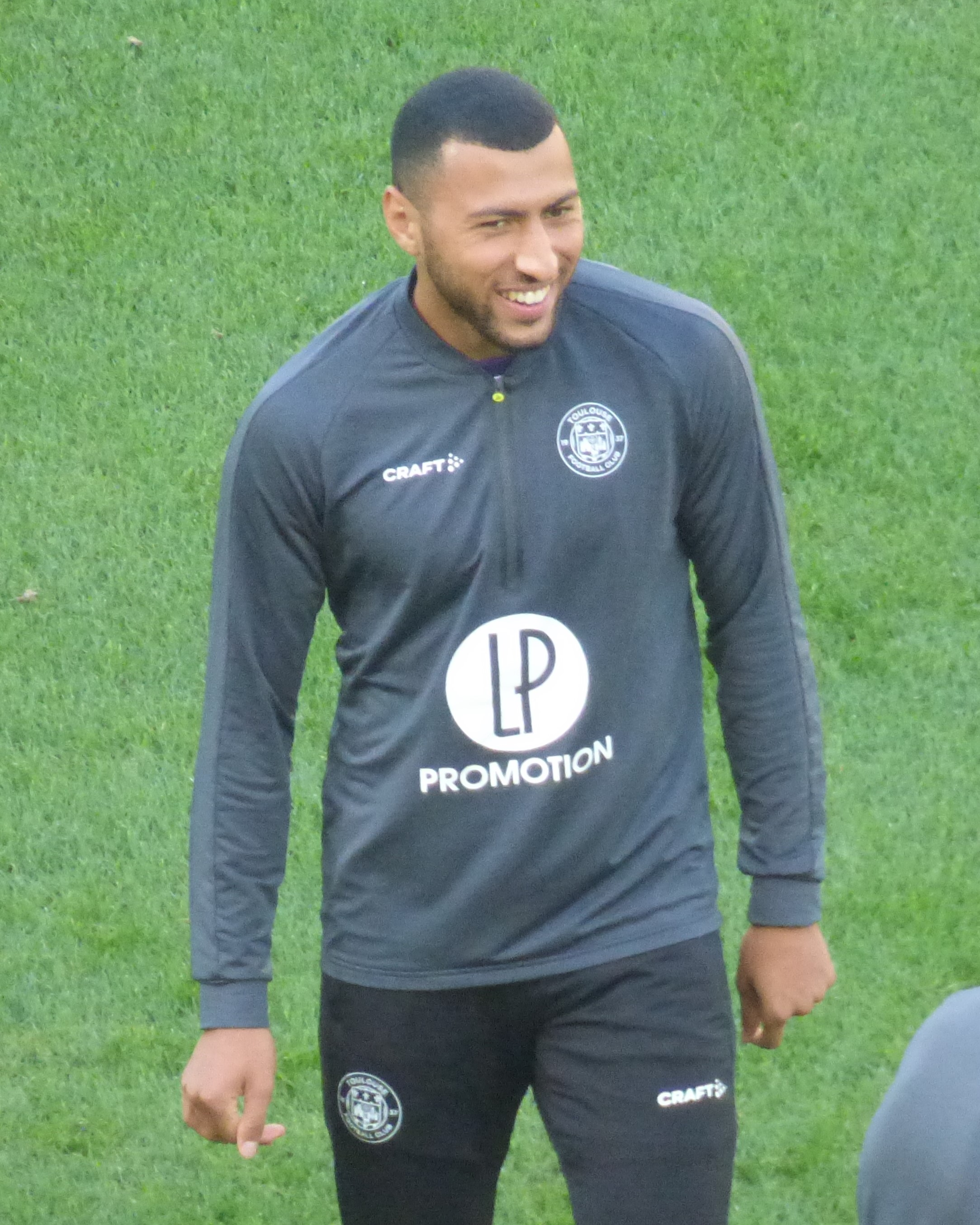
- Begraoui with Toulouse in 2023

Personal information
- Date of birth: 4 July 2001 (age 25)
- Place of birth: Étampes, France
- Height: 1.79 m (5 ft 10 in)
- Position: Forward

Team information
- Current team: Estoril
- Number: 14

Youth career
- 2007–2014: FC Étampes
- 2014–2017: CS Brétigny
- 2017–2018: Auxerre

Senior career*
Years	Team	Apps	(Gls)
2018–2021	Auxerre B	35	(23)
2018–2021	Auxerre	33	(2)
2021–2024	Toulouse	41	(0)
2021–2024	Toulouse B	6	(8)
2023	→ Pau (loan)	18	(9)
2024	→ Pau (loan)	19	(2)
2024–	Estoril	68	(31)

International career
2018	France U17	6	(2)
2018–2019	France U18	5	(2)
2019	France U19	10	(3)
2023–	Morocco U23	4	(3)
Medal record
Representing Morocco
U-23 Africa Cup of Nations
Winner	2023 Morocco
- * Club domestic league appearances and goals as of 25 May 2026

Yanis Begraoui (born 4 July 2001) is a professional footballer who plays as a forward for Primeira Liga club Estoril. Born in France, he represented Morocco at youth level.

== Club career ==
A youth product of FC Étampes and CS Brétigny, Begraoui signed with Auxerre in the summer of 2017. At the age of 16, he made his professional debut for the club in a 2–1 Ligue 2 loss to Clermont on 13 April 2018.

In the 2021–22 season, Begraoui won Ligue 2 with Toulouse.

On 29 January 2023, Begraoui was loaned to Pau in Ligue 2 until the end of the 2022–23 season.

In January 2024, he returned to Pau on loan until the end of the season.

In July 2024, he signed a four-year deal with Estoril in Portugal.

== International career ==
Begraoui was born in France and is of Moroccan descent, with roots in the Moroccan city Meknes. He is a former France youth international. He was called up to the Morocco U23s in March 2023.

In June 2023, he was included in the final squad of the under-23 national team for the 2023 U-23 Africa Cup of Nations, hosted by Morocco itself; he scored in the 2–1 final win over Egypt, which helped the Atlas Lions win their first title and qualify for the 2024 Summer Olympics.

== Honours ==
Toulouse

- Ligue 2: 2021–22

Morocco U23

- U-23 Africa Cup of Nations: 2023
