= Cheickna Doumbia =

Malian footballer

Personal information
- Date of birth: 14 June 2003 (age 23)
- Place of birth: Bamako, Mali
- Height: 1.79 m (5 ft 10 in) (Note: L'Equipe lists his height as 1.90 m (6 ft 3 in).)
- Position: Forward

Team information
- Current team: Sharjah
- Number: 98

Youth career
- –2021: Black Stars de Badalabougou

Senior career*
Years	Team	Apps	(Gls)
2022–2026	Shabab Al Ahli	24	(3)
2024–2025	→ Khor Fakkan (loan)	17	(5)
2025–2026	→ Al-Nasr (loan)	20	(6)
2026–	Sharjah	5	(0)

International career^{‡}
2023–2024	Mali U23	8	(3)
- * Club domestic league appearances and goals as of 20:57, 20 September 2026 (UTC) ‡ National team caps and goals as of 20:57, 20 September 2026 (UTC)

Cheickna Doumbia (born 14 June 2003) is a Malian footballer who plays as a forward for UAE Pro League side Sharjah.

== Club career ==
Doumbia started his youth career at Black Stars de Badalabougou in Mali, before joining Shabab Al Ahli Club in 2022. Following his injury at the 2023 U-23 Africa Cup of Nations, he made his competitive return towards the end of the 2023–24 season, playing three matches for Shabab Al Ahli.

In August 2024, he signed for Khor Fakkan Club on loan for the 2024–25 season. He later joined Al-Nasr SC on loan for the 2025–26 season.

== International career ==
Doumbia was called up to Mali's under-23 squad for the 2023 U-23 Africa Cup of Nations in Morocco. During the tournament, he scored two goals and was declared as the man of the match in a 2–0 group stage win against Niger. However, he also sustained an injury at the tournament that ruled him out of most of the 2023–24 season.

Doumbia was later called up for Mali's squad at the men's tournament at the 2024 Summer Olympics in Paris. He also scored Mali's only goal at the tournament, in a 1–1 draw with Israel.

== Honours ==
Shabab Al Ahli

- UAE Pro League: 2022–23
- UAE Super Cup: 2023

Mali U23

- U-23 Africa Cup of Nations third place: 2023
