= Kees Sims =

New Zealand footballer (born 2003)

Personal information
- Full name: Kees Edward Smids Sims
- Date of birth: 27 March 2003 (age 23)
- Place of birth: Bracknell, England
- Height: 1.94 m (6 ft 4 in)
- Position: Goalkeeper

Team information
- Current team: FK Haugesund
- Number: 13

Youth career
- –2019: Western Suburbs

Senior career*
Years	Team	Apps	(Gls)
2019–2021	Western Suburbs	26	(0)
2019–2020	→ Team Wellington (loan)	0	(0)
2020–2021	→ Wellington Phoenix II (loan)	1	(0)
2022–2023	Ljungskile SK	43	(0)
2024–	GAIS	18	(0)
2026–	→ FK Haugesund (loan)	0	(0)

International career^{‡}
2023	New Zealand U20	4	(0)
2023–	New Zealand U23	4	(0)
- * Club domestic league appearances and goals as of 26 May 2026 ‡ National team caps and goals as of 7 May 2024

Kees Edward Smids Sims (born 27 March 2003) is a New Zealand footballer who plays as a goalkeeper for Norwegian First Division club FK Haugesund, on loan from Allsvenskan side GAIS. Born in England, he represented New Zealand at youth international level.

== Club career ==
Sims made one appearance for Wellington Phoenix Reserves during the 2020-21 season, making his debut on 6 February 2021 against Hamilton Wanderers AFC in the New Zealand Football Championship. In 2021 Sims impresses playing for Western Suburbs FC in New Zealand’s Central League, playing every minute of every game.

=== Ljungskile SK ===
Sims moved to Sweden to join Ljungskile SK in January 2022, alongside two of his countrymen, Otto Ingham, and Robert Sabo. He was a substitute for the first fourteen games of the season but following an injury to first choice goalkeeper Oliver Bergman he made his debut against BK Olympic in July 2022, and kept his place for the remainder of the season. Sims signed a new three-year contract with the club in September 2022. During the off-season Sims trained with Premier League side Leicester City in January 2023.

=== GAIS ===
On 31 January 2024, Sims was announced at GAIS on a three year contract.

Despite being the primary backup to first-choice goalkeeper Mergim Krasniqi, Sims made eight appearances for the club in Allsvenskan. He made his league debut in a 2–1 victory against Mjällby AIF.

On 29 August 2026, Sims moved to Norwegian First Division side FK Haugesund on loan until the end of the 2026 season.

== International career ==
Sims has been eligible to represent England, New Zealand and the Netherlands at international level.

Sims was called up by New Zealand under-23 national team to play China in March 2023. He started that game and subsequently was named in the New Zealand squad for the 2023 FIFA U-20 World Cup.

On 9 July 2024, Sims was called up to the New Zealand U23s for the 2024 Summer Olympics.
