= Soumaïla Sylla =

Footballer (born 2004)

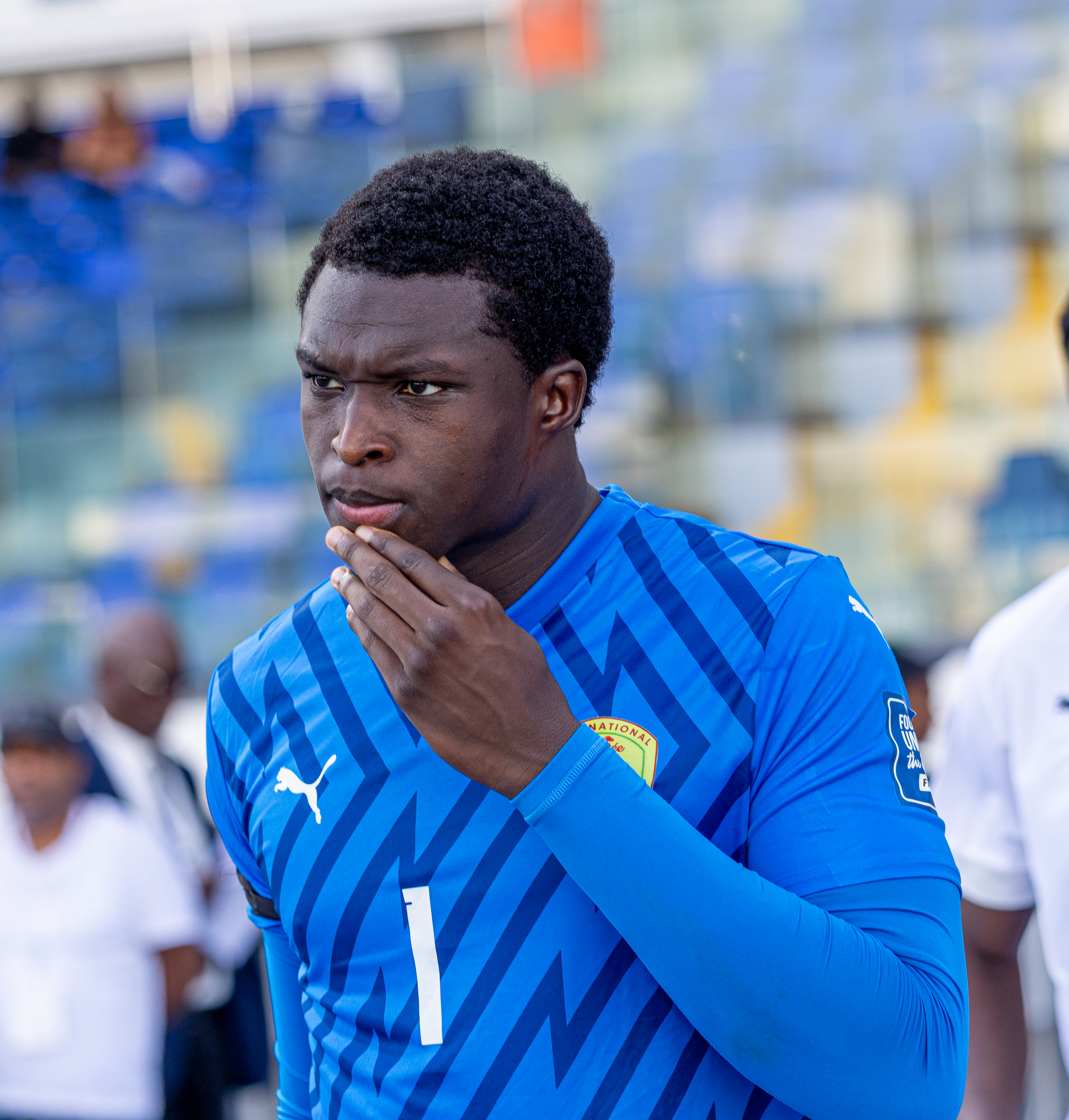
- Sylla with Guinea in 2025

Personal information
- Full name: Soumaïla Souwandy Sylla
- Date of birth: 15 March 2004 (age 22)
- Place of birth: Ivry-sur-Seine, France
- Height: 1.91 m (6 ft 3 in)
- Position: Goalkeeper

Team information
- Current team: Nîmes (on loan from Reims)
- Number: 40

Youth career
- 2013–2017: Ivry
- 2017–2018: Montrouge FC 92
- 2018–2019: Racing Club de France
- 2019–2022: Reims

Senior career*
Years	Team	Apps	(Gls)
2022–	Reims II	59	(0)
2023–	Reims	0	(0)
2026-	→ Nîmes (loan)	0	(0)

International career^{‡}
2022	France U18	1	(0)
2023	France U20	1	(0)
2024–	Guinea Olympic	4	(0)
2025–	Guinea	2	(0)
- * Club domestic league appearances and goals as of 11 May 2026 ‡ National team caps and goals as of 19:09, 7 April 2025 (UTC)

Soumaïla Souwandy Sylla (born 15 March 2004) is a professional football player who plays as a goalkeeper for Championnat National 1 club Nîmes, on loan from Ligue 2 club Reims. Born in France, he plays for the Guinea national team.

== Career ==
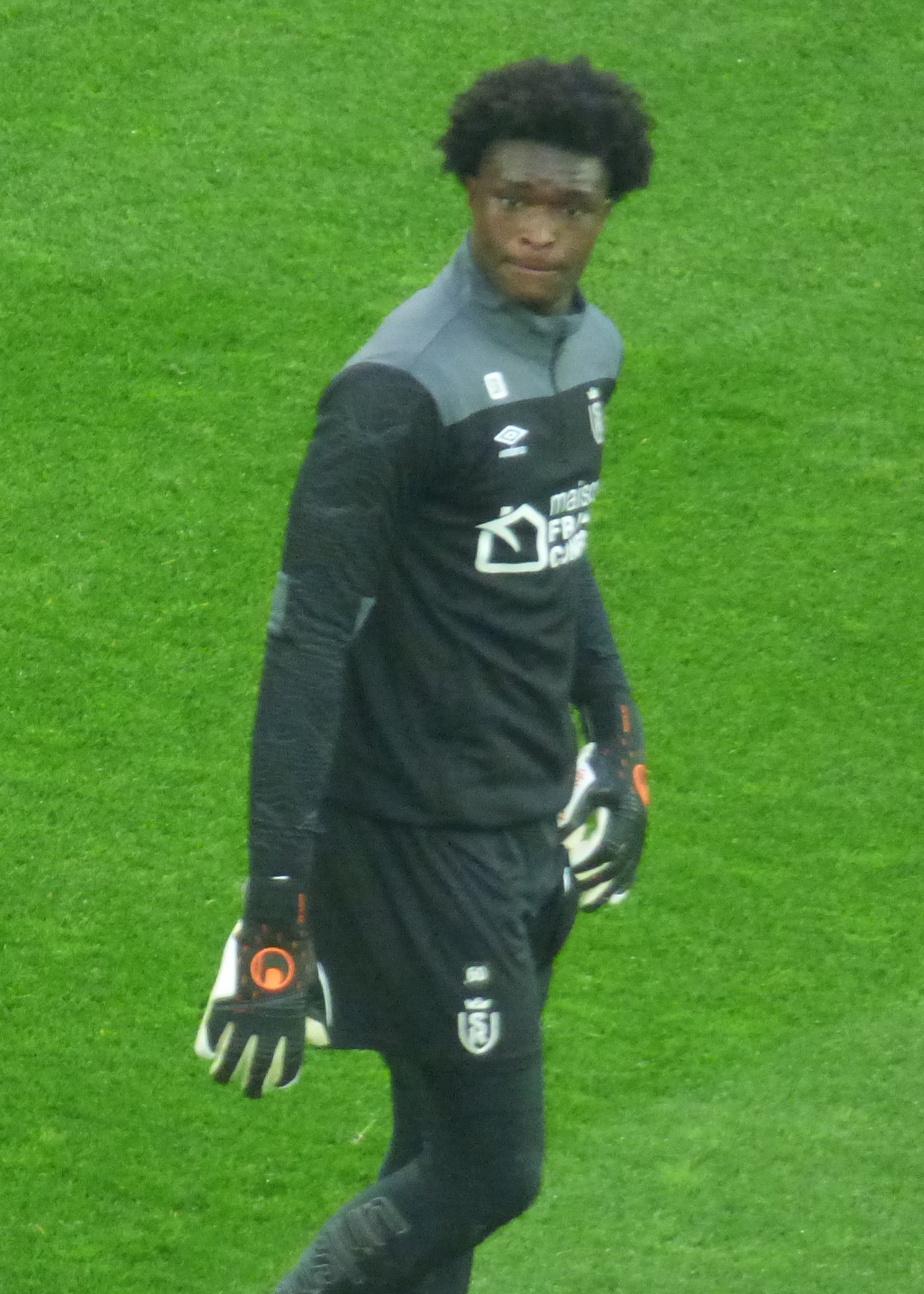
Sylla with Reims in 2023

Sylla is a product of the youth academies of Ivry, Montrouge FC 92 and Racing Club de France, before moving to Reims in 2019 to finish his development. He was promoted to Reims' reserves in the Championnat National 3 in 2022. On 30 April 2023, he made the matchday squad for the senior Reims team for the first time in a Ligue 1 match against Clermont. On 12 July 2024, he signed his first professional contract with Reims.

== International career ==
Born in France, Sylla is of Guinean descent. He was a youth international for France, having played for 2 friendlies. He was called up to the Guinea Olympic team that played at the 2024 Summer Olympics. He was called up to the senior Guinea national football team for a set of 2026 FIFA World Cup qualification matches in March 2025.

== Career statistics ==
=== Club ===
As of match played 17 May 2025

Appearances and goals by club, season and competition
Club	Season	League			Cup		Other		Total	
Club	Season	Division	Apps	Goals	Apps	Goals	Apps	Goals	Apps	Goals
Reims II	2021–22	CFA 2	3	0	—		—		3	0
Reims II	2022–23	CFA 2	11	0	—		—		11	0
Reims II	2023–24	National 3	8	0	—		—		8	0
Reims II	2024–25	National 3	16	0	—		—		16	0
Reims II	2025–26	National 3	0	0	—		—		0	0
Reims II	Total		38	0	—		—		38	0
Reims	2022–23	Ligue 1	0	0	0	0	—		0	0
Career total			38	0	0	0	0	0	38	0

=== International ===
As of match played 25 March 2025

Appearances and goals by national team and year
National team	Year	Apps	Goals
Guinea	2025	2	0
Total		2	0
