= Algassime Bah =

Guinean footballer (born 2002)

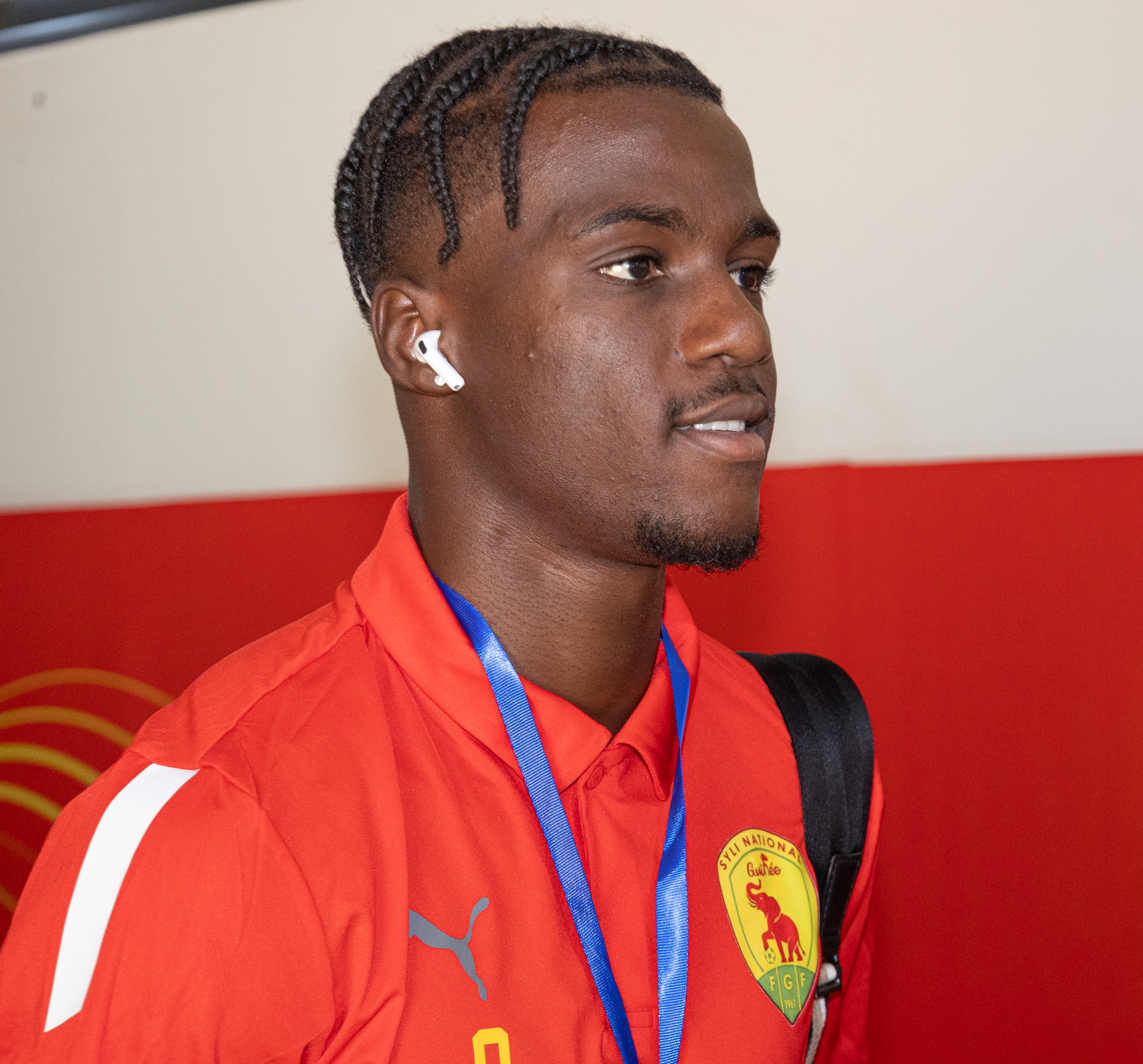

Personal information
- Full name: Algassime Bah
- Date of birth: 12 November 2002 (age 24)
- Place of birth: Conakry, Guinea
- Height: 1.82 m (6 ft 0 in)
- Position: Forward

Team information
- Current team: Dinamo Tbilisi
- Number: 12

Senior career*
Years	Team	Apps	(Gls)
2017–2021	Renaissance		
2019–2020	→ Vista (loan)		
2021–2024	Olympiacos	1	(0)
2021–2024	Olympiacos B	68	(26)
2024–2026	APOEL	15	(1)
2025–2026	→ Ypsonas (loan)	30	(7)
2026–	Dinamo Tbilisi	4	(1)

International career^{‡}
2019	Guinea U17	5	(1)
2023–	Guinea U23	9	(3)
2024–	Guinea	2	(0)
- * Club domestic league appearances and goals as of 15 November 2026 ‡ National team caps and goals as of 10 August 2024

Algassime Bah (born 12 November 2002) is a Guinean professional footballer who plays as a forward for Erovnuli Liga club Dinamo Tbilisi and the Guinea national team.

== Club career ==
In 2019, Bah was sent on loan to Russian lower league side Vista. In 2021, he signed for Olympiacos in the Greek top flight after receiving interest from Spanish La Liga club Atlético Madrid, AA Gent in Belgium, Italian Serie A team Milan, and France. On 19 September 2021, he debuted for Olympiacos during a 0–0 draw with Atromitos.

On 10 August 2024 Bah joined Cypriot First Division club APOEL, signing a three-year deal.

== International career ==
In June 2023, Bah was included in the final squad of the Guinean under-23 national team for the 2023 U-23 Africa Cup of Nations, hosted in Morocco, where the Syli finished in fourth place.

== Career statistics ==
As of match played 28 April 2024

Appearances and goals by club, season and competition
Club	Season	League			National cup		Europe		Other		Total	
Club	Season	Division	Apps	Goals	Apps	Goals	Apps	Goals	Apps	Goals	Apps	Goals
Olympiacos	2021–22	Super League Greece	1	0	1	0	0	0	0	0	2	0
Olympiacos	2023–24	Super League Greece	0	0	0	0	0	0	0	0	0	0
Olympiacos	Total		1	0	1	0	0	0	0	0	2	0
Olympiacos B	2021–22	Super League Greece 2	18	3	—		—		—		18	3
Olympiacos B	2022–23	Super League Greece 2	21	9	—		—		—		21	9
Olympiacos B	2023–24	Super League Greece 2	27	11	—		—		—		27	11
Olympiacos B	Total		66	23	—		—		—		66	23
Career total			67	23	1	0	0	0	0	0	68	23

== Honours ==
=== Individual ===
- Super League Greece 2 Young Player of the Season: 2022–23
