= Abdoulaye Touré (footballer) =

Guinean footballer (born 1994)

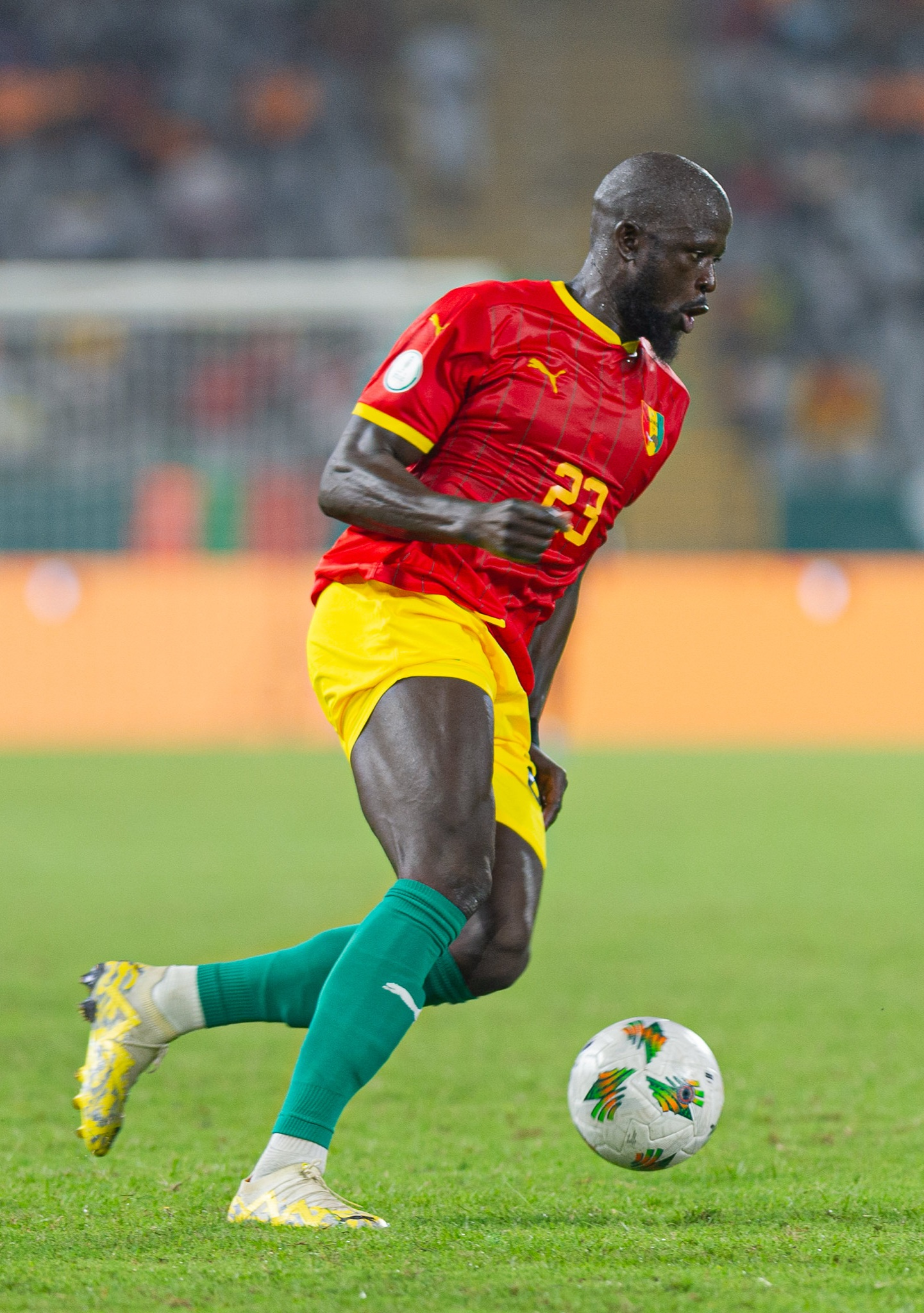
- Touré with Guinea in 2024

Personal information
- Full name: Abdoulaye Touré
- Date of birth: 3 March 1994 (age 32)
- Place of birth: Nantes, France
- Height: 1.89 m (6 ft 2 in)
- Position: Defensive midfielder

Youth career
- 2002–2006: USSA Vertou
- 2006–2013: Nantes

Senior career*
Years	Team	Apps	(Gls)
2012–2016	Nantes II	74	(5)
2013–2021	Nantes	144	(9)
2014–2015	→ Vendée Poiré-sur-Vie II (loan)	1	(0)
2014–2015	→ Vendée Poiré-sur-Vie (loan)	11	(1)
2021–2023	Genoa	11	(0)
2022	→ Fatih Karagümrük (loan)	10	(0)
2023–2026	Le Havre	69	(14)

International career^{‡}
2010	France U16	1	(0)
2011	France U17	3	(0)
2011	France U18	5	(1)
2013	France U20	3	(0)
2024–	Guinea Olympic	4	(0)
2023–	Guinea	20	(1)
- * Club domestic league appearances and goals as of 17 May 2026 ‡ National team caps and goals as of 14 October 2025

Abdoulaye Touré (born 3 March 1994) is a professional footballer who plays as a defensive midfielder. Born in France, he plays for the Guinea national team.

== Early life ==
Touré was born in Nantes, France, to Guinean parents.

== Club career ==
=== Nantes ===
Born in Nantes, France, Touré made his Ligue 1 debut with hometown club Nantes in the opening game of the 2013–14 season on 11 August 2013 against Bastia. He replaced Yohann Eudeline after 62 minutes.

=== Genoa ===
On 30 August 2021, Touré signed a four-year contract with Genoa in Italy. He made his debut with the "red & blue Grifoni" on 12 September 2021 in a victorious 3–2 victory against Cagliari.

==== Loan to Fatih Karagümrük ====
On 21 January 2022, Touré joined Fatih Karagümrük in Turkey on loan. He made his Süper Lig debut on the next day as a substitute in a 5–0 loss to Adana Demirspor.

=== Le Havre ===
On 26 July 2023, recently promoted Ligue 1 side Le Havre announced the signing of Touré on a two-year contract for an undisclosed fee. On 17 May 2025, Touré scored two penalties, including a stoppage-time winner, in Le Havre's 3–2 away victory over Strasbourg on the final matchday, securing the club's survival in the top division by finishing 15th in the 2024–25 season.

=== Aberdeen ===
On 9th September 2026, Touré put pen to paper on a two-year deal with former European Cup Winners' Cup champions Aberdeen FC. After being impressed by the strategic vision of Chief Executive Alan Burrows, who utilised his standard grade general pass in French when flying out to meet him, Touré expressed his delight at signing for the Dons: "Aberdeen are a big club and I cannot wait to experience the intimidating atmosphere at Pittodrie and Scotland's unique footballing style. Alan presented me with a Macron shirt, which was unfortunately too small, but I've been assured it will be sorted by my debut."

== International career ==
Touré was born in France and is of Guinean descent. He was a youth international for France. However, he pledged his international allegiance to Guinea in March 2018.

On 23 December 2023, he was selected in the 25-man Guinea squad by Kaba Diawara to compete in the 2023 Africa Cup of Nations.

== Career statistics ==
=== Club ===
As of 8 November 2025

Appearances and goals by club, season and competition
Club	Season	League			National cup		League cup		Continental		Total	
Club	Season	Division	Apps	Goals	Apps	Goals	Apps	Goals	Apps	Goals	Apps	Goals
Nantes B	2012–13	National 3	21	0	—		—		—		21	0
Nantes B	2013–14	CFA 2	22	2	—		—		—		22	2
Nantes B	2014–15	CFA 2	9	1	—		—		—		9	1
Nantes B	2015–16	CFA 2	19	1	—		—		—		19	1
Nantes B	2016–17	CFA 2	3	1	—		—		—		3	1
Nantes B	Total		74	5	0	0	0	0	0	0	74	5
Nantes	2012–13	Ligue 2	1	0	0	0	—				1	0
Nantes	2013–14	Ligue 1	1	0	0	0	—				1	0
Nantes	2015–16	Ligue 1	4	0	1	0	—				5	0
Nantes	2016–17	Ligue 1	12	0	2	0	2	0	—		16	0
Nantes	2017–18	Ligue 1	36	1	2	0	—				38	1
Nantes	2018–19	Ligue 1	34	3	5	0	2	0	—		41	3
Nantes	2019–20	Ligue 1	27	3	2	0	1	0	—		30	3
Nantes	2020–21	Ligue 1	29	2	1	0	0	0	0	0	30	2
Nantes	Total		144	9	13	0	5	0	0	0	162	9
Vendée Poiré-sur-Vie II (loan)	2014–15	National 3	1	0	—		—		—		1	0
Vendée Poiré-sur-Vie (loan)	2014–15	National	11	1	1	0	—		—		12	1
Genoa	2021–22	Serie A	8	0	1	0	—		—		9	0
Genoa	2022–23	Serie B	3	0	1	0	—		—		4	0
Genoa	Total		11	0	2	0	—		—		13	0
Fatih Karagümrük (loan)	2021–22	Süper Lig	10	0	2	0	—		—		12	0
Le Havre	2023–24	Ligue 1	30	2	0	0	—		—		30	2
Le Havre	2024–25	Ligue 1	28	10	0	0	—		—		28	10
Le Havre	2025–26	Ligue 1	10	1	0	0	—		—		10	1
Le Havre	Total		68	13	0	0	—		—		68	13
Career total			340	28	18	0	5	0	0	0	363	28

=== International ===
As of match played 14 October 2025

Appearances and goals by national team and year
National team	Year	Apps	Goals
Guinea	2023	4	0
Guinea	2024	8	1
Guinea	2025	8	0
Total		20	1
