= Guinea national under-23 football team =

National association football team

Guinea U-23
- Nickname(s): Syli National (National Elephants)
- Association: Guinean Football Federation
- Confederation: CAF (Africa)
- Sub-confederation: WAFU (West Africa)
- Head coach: Morlaye Cissé
- Home stadium: Stade du 28 Septembre; Stade Général Lansana Conté
- FIFA code: GUI
First colours	Second colours

First international
- Algeria 1–1 Guinea (Algiers, Algeria; April 14, 1995)

Biggest win
- Guinea 4–1 Gabon (Conakry, Guinea; June 13, 1999); Guinea 4–1 Mauritania (Conakry, Guinea; November 20, 2018)

Biggest defeat
- England 7–1 Guinea (Aubagne, France; May 23, 2016)

Olympic Games
- Appearances: 2 (first in 1968)
- Best result: Group stage (1968, 2024)

U-23 Africa Cup of Nations
- Appearances: 1 (first in 2023)
- Best result: Fourth place (2023)

Guinea national under-23 and Olympic football team, represents Guinea in association football at an under-23 age level and is controlled by Guinean Football Federation, the governing body for football in Guinea.

== Recent results and fixtures ==
Win Draw Loss Fixture

== Coaching staff ==
As of 1 April 2024

Position	Name
Interim Head Coach	(Guinea) Kaba Diawara
Head Coach	(Guinea) Morlaye Cissé
Assistant Coach	(Guinea) Pascal Baruxakis
Goalkeeping Coach	(Guinea) Kémoko Camara
Intendant	(Guinea) Ibrahima Diallo
Team Doctor	(Guinea) Ibrahima Camara
Team Manager	(Guinea) Daman Touré

== Players ==
=== Current squad ===
The following players were called up for the 2024 Olympic Games.

Caps and goals as of 9 May 2024 after the match against Indonesia.

No.	Pos.	Player	Date of birth (age)	Caps	Goals	Club
	GK	Mory Keita	13 July 2005 (age 21)	5	0	(Guinean Football Federation) Sangarédi
	GK	Soumaïla Sylla	15 March 2004 (age 22)	1	0	(French Football Federation) Reims
	DF	Mohamed Soumah	13 March 2003 (age 23)	7	0	(Royal Belgian Football Association) Gent
	DF	Madiou Keita	29 August 2004 (age 22)	6	0	(French Football Federation) Auxerre
	DF	Naby Oularé	6 August 2002 (age 24)	5	0	(Turkish Football Federation) Boluspor
	DF	Bangaly Cissé	28 December 2002 (age 23)	4	0	(Guinean Football Federation) Kaloum
	DF	Rayane Doucouré	30 March 2001 (age 25)	0	0	(French Football Federation) Red Star
	MF	Aguibou Camara	20 May 2001 (age 25)	6	1	(Hellenic Football Federation) Atromitos
	MF	Ilaix Moriba	19 January 2003 (age 23)	1	1	(Royal Spanish Football Federation) Getafe
	MF	Issiaga Camara	2 February 2005 (age 21)	1	0	(French Football Federation) Nice
	MF	Abdoulaye Touré*	3 March 1994 (age 32)	0	0	(French Football Federation) Le Havre
	MF	Naby Keïta* (captain)	10 February 1995 (age 31)	0	0	(German Football Association) Werder Bremen
	MF	Amadou Diawara*	17 July 1997 (age 29)	0	0	(Royal Belgian Football Association) Anderlecht
	FW	Algassime Bah	12 November 2002 (age 23)	7	1	(Cyprus Football Association) APOEL
	FW	Ousmane Camara	3 November 2001 (age 25)	7	0	(French Football Federation) Annecy
	FW	Amadou Diallo	13 July 2006 (age 20)	1	0	(French Football Federation) Rennes
	FW	Aliou Baldé	12 December 2002 (age 23)	0	0	(French Football Federation) Nice
	FW	Henry Camara	6 May 2006 (age 20)	0	0	(Italian Football Federation) Atalanta

* Overage player.

=== Recent call ups ===
Pos.	Player	Date of birth (age)	Caps	Goals	Club	Latest call-up
Notes: ^{INJ} = Player withdrew from the squad due to an injury.; ^{PRE} = Preliminary squad.; ^{WD} = Player withdrew from the squad for non-injury related reasons.

=== Overage players in the Olympic Games ===
Since 1992, the olympic roster may consist out of under-23-year-old players, plus three over the age players.

Tournament	Player 1	Player 2	Player 3
2024	Amadou Diawara (MF)	Naby Keïta (MF)	Abdoulaye Touré (MF)

== Competition records ==
=== Summer Olympic Games ===
Summer Olympic Games record
Year	Result	Position	Pld	W	D	L	GF	GA
1992 to 2020	Did not qualify							
(France) 2024	Group stage	16th	3	0	0	3	1	6
Total	1/8	Group stage	3	0	0	3	1	6

=== Africa U-23 Cup of Nations ===
Year	Round	Position	Pld	W	D	L	GF	GA
2011 to 2019	Did not qualify							
(Morocco) 2023	Fourth place	4th	4	1	1	2	4	3
Total	1/4	–	4	1	1	2	4	3
