= Football at the 2024 Summer Olympics – Men's tournament =

2024 Men's Olympic Football Tournament

Tournament details
- Host country: France
- Dates: 24 July – 9 August
- Teams: 16 (from 6 confederations)
- Venues: 7 (in 7 host cities)

Final positions
- Champions: Spain (2nd title)
- Runners-up: France
- Third place: Morocco
- Fourth place: Egypt

Tournament statistics
- Matches played: 32
- Goals scored: 96 (3 per match)
- Attendance: 821,961 (25,686 per match)
- Top scorer(s): (Morocco) Soufiane Rahimi (8 goals)

The men's football tournament at the 2024 Summer Olympics was held from 24 July to 9 August 2024. It was the 28th edition of the men's Olympic football tournament. Together with the women's competition, the 2024 Summer Olympics football tournament was held at seven stadiums in seven cities in France. Teams participating in the men's competition were restricted to under-23 players (born on or after 1 January 2001) with a maximum of three overage players allowed.

Brazil were the two-time defending champions, having won in 2016 and 2020, but did not qualify for this tournament.

Spain won their second gold medal and first since 1992, defeating hosts France 5–3 after extra time in the final, held at Parc des Princes in Paris.

== Schedule ==
The schedule was as follows.

Legend
G	Group stage	¼	Quarter-finals	½	Semi-finals	B	Bronze medal match	F	Gold medal match

Wed 24	Thu 25	Fri 26	Sat 27	Sun 28	Mon 29	Tue 30	Wed 31	Thu 1	Fri 2	Sat 3	Sun 4	Mon 5	Tue 6	Wed 7	Thu 8	Fri 9
GS			GS			GS			QF			SF			B	F

== Qualification ==
In addition to host nation France, fifteen men's national teams qualified from six separate continental confederations. The Organising Committee for FIFA Competitions ratified the distribution of spots at their meeting on 24 February 2022.

Means of qualification	Date(s) (Note: Dates and venues are those of final tournaments (or final round of qualification tournaments); various qualification stages may precede these matches.)	Venue(s)	Berth(s)	Qualified
Host nation	—N/a	—N/a	1	France
2022 CONCACAF U-20 Championship	18 June – 3 July 2022	Honduras	2	United States; Dominican Republic
2023 UEFA European Under-21 Championship	21 June – 8 July 2023	Georgia; Romania	3	Spain; Israel; Ukraine
2023 U-23 Africa Cup of Nations	24 June – 8 July 2023	Morocco	3	Morocco; Egypt; Mali
2023 OFC Olympic Qualifying Tournament	27 August – 9 September 2023	New Zealand	1	New Zealand
2024 CONMEBOL Pre-Olympic Tournament	20 January – 11 February 2024	Venezuela	2	Paraguay; Argentina
2024 AFC U-23 Asian Cup	15 April – 3 May 2024	Qatar	3	Japan; Uzbekistan; Iraq
AFC–CAF play-off	9 May 2024	France	1	Guinea
Total			16	

== Venues ==
Marseille	Décines-Charpieu (Lyon Area)	Paris
Stade de Marseille	Stade de Lyon	Parc des Princes
Capacity: 67,394	Capacity: 59,186	Capacity: 47,929
Location of the host cities of the men's football tournament of the 2024 Summer Olympics.		Bordeaux
Location of the host cities of the men's football tournament of the 2024 Summer Olympics.		Stade de Bordeaux
Location of the host cities of the men's football tournament of the 2024 Summer Olympics.		Capacity: 42,115
Saint-Étienne	Nice	Nantes
Stade Geoffroy-Guichard	Stade de Nice	Stade de la Beaujoire
Capacity: 41,965	Capacity: 36,178	Capacity: 35,322

== Squads ==
Each team had to submit a squad of eighteen players, two of whom had to be goalkeepers, with at least fifteen born on or after 1 January 2001, and three who could be older dispensation players. Additionally, each team could also have a list of four alternate players, who could replace any player in the squad in case of injury during the tournament.

== Match officials ==
On 3 April 2024, FIFA released the list of match referees that would officiate at the Olympics.

Match officials (Note: Male field referees are shown in the table. During the tournament, mixed officials were appointed for some matches.)
Confederation	Referee	Assistant referees
AFC	Adel Al-Naqbi (United Arab Emirates)	Ahmed Al-Rashadi (United Arab Emirates); Sabet Obaid Suroor Al-Ali (United Arab Emirates)
AFC	Ilgiz Tantashev (Uzbekistan)	Timur Gaynullin (Uzbekistan); Andrey Tsapenko (Uzbekistan)
CAF	Dahane Beida (Mauritania)	Liban Abdoulrazack Ahmed (Djibouti); Elvis Noupue (Cameroon)
CAF	Mahmood Ismail (Sudan)	Jerson Emiliano dos Santos (Angola); Stephen Yiembe (Kenya)
CONCACAF	Drew Fischer (Canada)	Lyes Arfa (Canada); Micheal Barwegen (Canada)
CONCACAF	Saíd Martínez (Honduras)	Walter López (Honduras); Christian Ramírez (Honduras)
CONMEBOL	Yael Falcón (Argentina)	Facundo Rodríguez (Argentina); Maximiliano Del Yesso (Argentina)
CONMEBOL	Ramon Abatti (Brazil)	Rafael Alves (Brazil); Guillerme Camilo (Brazil)
OFC	Campbell-Kirk Kawana-Waugh (New Zealand)	Isaac Trevis (New Zealand); Bernard Mutukera (Solomon Islands)
UEFA	François Letexier (France)	Cyril Mugnier (France); Mehdi Rahmouni (France)
UEFA	Espen Eskås (Norway)	Isaak Bashevkin (Norway); Jan Erik Engan (Norway)
UEFA	Glenn Nyberg (Sweden)	Mahbod Beigi (Sweden); Andreas Söderkvist (Sweden)

Support officials
Confederation	Referee
AFC	Veronika Bernatskaia (Kyrgyzstan)
CAF	Shamirah Nabadda (Uganda)
CONCACAF	Odette Hamilton (Jamaica)
CONMEBOL	Anahí Fernández (Uruguay)
UEFA	Frida Klarlund (Denmark)
UEFA	Jelena Cvetković (Serbia)

Video assistant referees
Confederation	Video assistant referee
Male officials
AFC	Khamis Al-Marri (Qatar)
AFC	Sivakorn Pu-udom (Thailand)
CAF	Lahlou Benbraham (Algeria)
CAF	Mahmoud Ashour (Egypt)
CONCACAF	Daneon Parchment (Jamaica)
CONCACAF	Guillermo Pacheco (Mexico)
CONMEBOL	Héctor Paletta (Argentina)
CONMEBOL	Rodrigo Carvajal (Chile)
CONMEBOL	Leodán González (Uruguay)
UEFA	Ivan Bebek (Croatia)
UEFA	David Coote (Great Britain)
UEFA	Jérôme Brisard (France)
UEFA	Paolo Valeri (Italy)
UEFA	Rob Dieperink (Netherlands)
UEFA	Ovidiu Hațegan (Romania)
UEFA	Carlos del Cerro Grande (Spain)
Female officials
AFC	Kate Jacewicz (Australia)
CONCACAF	Tatiana Guzmán (Nicaragua)
CONMEBOL	Daiane Muniz (Brazil)
UEFA	Katalin Kulcsár (Hungary)

== Draw ==
The draw for the groups was held on 20 March 2024, 20:00 CET (UTC+1), at the Pulse building in Saint-Denis, France. The sixteen teams were drawn into four groups of four teams each. The hosts France were automatically seeded into Pot 1 and placed into the first position of Group A, while the remaining teams were seeded into their respective pots based on their results in the last five Men's Olympic Football Tournament (with more recent tournaments weighted more heavily), as follows:

- 2004 Men's Olympic Football Tournament: 20% value of total points;
- 2008 Men's Olympic Football Tournament: 40% value of total points;
- 2012 Men's Olympic Football Tournament: 60% value of total points;
- 2016 Men's Olympic Football Tournament: 80% value of total points;
- 2020 Men's Olympic Football Tournament: 100% value of total points.

Furthermore, five bonus points were added to each of the six continental champions from the qualifying tournaments.

Pot	Team	Confederation	2004		2008		2012		2016		2020	BP	Total points
Pot	Team	Confederation	Pts	20%	Pts	40%	Pts	60%	Pts	80%	Pts 100%	BP	Total points
1	France (H)	UEFA	Host nation, automatically assigned to Pot 1										
1	Japan (AFC 1, results of Japan) (Note: As the three teams qualified through the AFC U-23 Asian Cup were to be known only after the draw, placeholders were allocated according to the ranking of the AFC teams in the 2020 Men's Olympic Football Tournament, i.e. the results of Japan, South Korea, and Australia in the previous 5 Men's Olympic Football Tournament were taken into account. The placeholders were named “AFC 1”, “AFC 2” and “AFC 3”.)	AFC	3	0.6	0	0	10	6	4	3.2	10		19.8
1	Uzbekistan (AFC 2, results of South Korea)	AFC	5	1	4	1.6	9	5.4	7	5.6	6		19.6
1	Argentina	CONMEBOL	18	3.6	18	7.2	DNQ		4	3.2	4		18
2	Spain	UEFA	DNQ				1	0.6	DNQ		11	+5	16.6
2	New Zealand	OFC	DNQ		1	0.4	1	0.6	DNQ		5	+5	11
2	Paraguay	CONMEBOL	12	2.4	DNQ							+5	7.4
2	Morocco	CAF	4	0.8	DNQ		2	1.2	DNQ			+5	7
3	United States	CONCACAF	DNQ		4	1.6	DNQ					+5	6.6
3	Egypt	CAF	DNQ				4	2.4	DNQ		4		6.4
3	Iraq (AFC 3, results of Australia)	AFC	OFC		1	0.4	DNQ				3		3.4
3	Mali	CAF	5	1	DNQ								1
4	Dominican Republic	CONCACAF	DNQ										0
4	Israel	UEFA	DNQ										0
4	Ukraine	UEFA	DNQ										0
4	Guinea (Note: As the AFC–CAF play-off was to be played after the draw, the placeholder was allocated to Pot 4 and would not be drawn into a group already containing an AFC or CAF team.)	CAF	AFC-CAF play-off winners, automatically assigned to Pot 4										

Notes

The draw started with teams from Pot 1 being drawn first and placed in the first position of their groups (hosts France automatically assigned to A1). Then the teams from Pot 2 were drawn, followed by Pot 3 and Pot 4, with each team also being drawn to one of the positions within their group. No group could contain more than one team from each confederation. The ceremony was hosted by the local presenter Fabien Leveque and conducted by FIFA's Director of Tournaments Jaime Yarza and Chief Women's Football Officer Sarai Bareman, with the former Argentine footballer Javier Saviola and French track and field legend athlete Marie-José Pérec as draw assistants.

The draw resulted in the following groups:

Group A
Pos	Team
A1	France
A2	United States
A3	Guinea (Note: The identity of these teams was not known at the time of the draw.)
A4	New Zealand

Group B
Pos	Team
B1	Argentina
B2	Morocco
B3	Iraq
B4	Ukraine

Group C
Pos	Team
C1	Uzbekistan
C2	Spain
C3	Egypt
C4	Dominican Republic

Group D
Pos	Team
D1	Japan
D2	Paraguay
D3	Mali
D4	Israel

== Group stage ==
The competing countries were divided into four groups of four teams, denoted as groups A, B, C and D. Teams in each group played one another in a round-robin basis, with the top two teams of each group advancing to the quarter-finals.

All times are local, CEST (UTC+2).

=== Tiebreakers ===
The ranking of teams in the group stage was determined as follows:

1. Points obtained in all group matches (three points for a win, one for a draw, none for a defeat);
2. Goal difference in all group matches;
3. Number of goals scored in all group matches;
4. Points obtained in the matches played between the teams in question;
5. Goal difference in the matches played between the teams in question;
6. Number of goals scored in the matches played between the teams in question;
7. Fair play points in all group matches (only one deduction could be applied to a player in a single match):
  - Yellow card: −1 point;
  - Indirect red card (second yellow card): −3 points;
  - Direct red card: −4 points;
  - Yellow card and direct red card: −5 points;
8. Drawing of lots.

=== Group A ===
Pos	Team	Pld	W	D	L	GF	GA	GD	Pts	Qualification
1	France (H)	3	3	0	0	7	0	+7	9	Advance to knockout stage
2	United States	3	2	0	1	7	4	+3	6	Advance to knockout stage
3	New Zealand	3	1	0	2	3	8	−5	3	
4	Guinea	3	0	0	3	1	6	−5	0	

Source: FIFA
(H) Hosts
24 July 2024
17:00

Guinea	1–2	New Zealand
Diawara 72'	Report	Garbett 25'; Waine 76'

Stade de Nice, Nice
Attendance: 4,909
Referee: Adel Al-Naqbi (United Arab Emirates)
24 July 2024
21:00

France	3–0	United States
Lacazette 61'; Olise 69'; Badé 85'	Report

Stade de Marseille, Marseille
Attendance: 48,721
Referee: Yael Falcón (Argentina)

27 July 2024
19:00

New Zealand	1–4	United States
Randall 78'	Report	Mihailovic 8' (pen.); Zimmerman 12'; Busio 30'; Aaronson 58'

Stade de Marseille, Marseille
Attendance: 9,468
Referee: Glenn Nyberg (Sweden)
27 July 2024
21:00

France	1–0	Guinea
Sildillia 75'	Report

Stade de Nice, Nice
Attendance: 25,965
Referee: Ilgiz Tantashev (Uzbekistan)

30 July 2024
19:00

New Zealand	0–3	France
	Report	Mateta 19'; Doué 71'; Kalimuendo 74'

Stade de Marseille, Marseille
Attendance: 45,790
Referee: Katia García (Mexico)
30 July 2024
19:00

United States	3–0	Guinea
Mihailovic 14'; Paredes 31', 75'	Report

Stade Geoffroy-Guichard, Saint-Étienne
Attendance: 6,245
Referee: Tess Olofsson (Sweden)

=== Group B ===
Pos	Team	Pld	W	D	L	GF	GA	GD	Pts	Qualification
1	Morocco	3	2	0	1	6	3	+3	6 (Note: Head-to-head points: Morocco 3, Argentina 0.)	Advance to knockout stage
2	Argentina	3	2	0	1	6	3	+3	6	Advance to knockout stage
3	Ukraine	3	1	0	2	3	5	−2	3	
4	Iraq	3	1	0	2	3	7	−4	3	

Source: FIFA
Notes:
24 July 2024
15:00

Argentina	1–2	Morocco
Simeone 68'	Report	Rahimi 45+2', 51' (pen.)

Stade Geoffroy-Guichard, Saint-Étienne
Attendance: 26,717
Referee: Glenn Nyberg (Sweden)
24 July 2024
19:00

Iraq	2–1	Ukraine
Hussein 57' (pen.); Jasim 75'	Report	Rubchynskyi 53'

Stade de Lyon, Décines-Charpieu
Attendance: 10,637
Referee: Mahmood Ismail (Sudan)

27 July 2024
15:00

Argentina	3–1	Iraq
Almada 14'; Gondou 62'; Fernández 85'	Report	Hussein 45+5'

Stade de Lyon, Décines-Charpieu
Attendance: 30,008
Referee: Espen Eskås (Norway)
27 July 2024
17:00

Ukraine	2–1	Morocco
Kryskiv 22'; Krasnopir 90+8'	Report	Rahimi 64' (pen.)

Stade Geoffroy-Guichard, Saint-Étienne
Attendance: 28,655
Referee: Saíd Martínez (Honduras)

30 July 2024
17:00

Ukraine	0–2	Argentina
	Report	Almada 47'; Echeverri 90+1'

Stade de Lyon, Décines-Charpieu
Attendance: 10,017
Referee: Dahane Beida (Mauritania)
30 July 2024
17:00

Morocco	3–0	Iraq
Richardson 19'; Rahimi 28'; Ezzalzouli 36'	Report

Stade de Nice, Nice
Attendance: 19,300
Referee: Ramon Abatti (Brazil)

=== Group C ===
Pos	Team	Pld	W	D	L	GF	GA	GD	Pts	Qualification
1	Egypt	3	2	1	0	3	1	+2	7	Advance to knockout stage
2	Spain	3	2	0	1	6	4	+2	6	Advance to knockout stage
3	Dominican Republic	3	0	2	1	2	4	−2	2	
4	Uzbekistan	3	0	1	2	2	4	−2	1	

Source: FIFA
24 July 2024
15:00

Uzbekistan	1–2	Spain
Shomurodov 45+3' (pen.)	Report	Pubill 28'; Gómez 62'

Parc des Princes, Paris
Attendance: 33,732
Referee: Dahane Beida (Mauritania)
24 July 2024
17:00

Egypt	0–0	Dominican Republic
	Report

Stade de la Beaujoire, Nantes
Attendance: 13,945
Referee: Yoshimi Yamashita (Japan)

27 July 2024
15:00

Dominican Republic	1–3	Spain
Montes de Oca 38'	Report	López 24'; Baena 55'; Gutiérrez 70'

Stade de Bordeaux, Bordeaux
Attendance: 16,099
Referee: Adel Al-Naqbi (United Arab Emirates)
27 July 2024
17:00

Uzbekistan	0–1	Egypt
	Report	Koka 11'

Stade de la Beaujoire, Nantes
Attendance: 20,658
Referee: Campbell-Kirk Kawana-Waugh (New Zealand)

30 July 2024
15:00

Dominican Republic	1–1	Uzbekistan
Núñez 51' (pen.)	Report	Odilov 58'

Parc des Princes, Paris
Attendance: 30,475
Referee: Mahmood Ismail (Sudan)
30 July 2024
15:00

Spain	1–2	Egypt
Aghehowa 90'	Report	Adel 40', 62'

Stade de Bordeaux, Bordeaux
Attendance: 12,180
Referee: Drew Fischer (Canada)

=== Group D ===
Pos	Team	Pld	W	D	L	GF	GA	GD	Pts	Qualification
1	Japan	3	3	0	0	7	0	+7	9	Advance to knockout stage
2	Paraguay	3	2	0	1	5	7	−2	6	Advance to knockout stage
3	Mali	3	0	1	2	1	3	−2	1	
4	Israel	3	0	1	2	3	6	−3	1	

Source: FIFA
24 July 2024
19:00

Japan	5–0	Paraguay
Mito 18', 63'; Yamamoto 69'; Fujio 81', 87'	Report

Stade de Bordeaux, Bordeaux
Attendance: 14,000
Referee: François Letexier (France)
24 July 2024
21:00

Mali	1–1	Israel
Doumbia 63'	Report	H. Diallo 56' (o.g.)

Parc des Princes, Paris
Attendance: 26,305
Referee: Campbell-Kirk Kawana-Waugh (New Zealand)

27 July 2024
19:00

Israel	2–4	Paraguay
Gandelman 53'; Gloukh 80'	Report	M. Fernández 25', 90+6'; Enciso 69'; Balbuena 90+3'

Parc des Princes, Paris
Attendance: 28,887
Referee: Drew Fischer (Canada)
27 July 2024
21:00

Japan	1–0	Mali
Yamamoto 82'	Report

Stade de Bordeaux, Bordeaux
Attendance: 9,893
Referee: Edina Alves Batista (Brazil)

30 July 2024
21:00

Israel	0–1	Japan
	Report	Hosoya 90+1'

Stade de la Beaujoire, Nantes
Attendance: 11,671
Referee: Saíd Martínez (Honduras)
30 July 2024
21:00

Paraguay	1–0	Mali
M. Fernández 5'	Report

Parc des Princes, Paris
Attendance: 35,736
Referee: Ilgiz Tantashev (Uzbekistan)

== Knockout stage ==
In the knockout stage, if a match was level at the end of normal playing time, extra time was played (two periods of 15 minutes each) and followed, if necessary, by a penalty shoot-out to determine the winner.

=== Bracket ===
Quarter-finals
2 August – Bordeaux
France	1
Argentina	0
2 August – Marseille
Egypt (p)	1 (5)
Paraguay	1 (4)
2 August – Paris
Morocco	4
United States	0
2 August – Décines-Charpieu
Japan	0
Spain	3

Semi-finals
5 August – Décines-Charpieu
France (a.e.t.)	3
Egypt	1
5 August – Marseille
Morocco	1
Spain	2

Gold medal match
9 August – Paris
France	3
Spain (a.e.t.)	5
Bronze medal match
8 August – Nantes
Egypt	0
Morocco	6

=== Quarter-finals ===
2 August 2024
15:00

Morocco	4–0	United States
Rahimi 29' (pen.); Akhomach 63'; Hakimi 70'; Maouhoub 90+1' (pen.)	Report

Parc des Princes, Paris
Attendance: 42,868
Referee: Yael Falcón (Argentina)

2 August 2024
17:00

Japan	0–3	Spain
	Report	López 11', 73'; Ruiz 86'

Stade de Lyon, Décines-Charpieu
Attendance: 19,111
Referee: Dahane Beida (Mauritania)

2 August 2024
19:00

Egypt	1–1 (a.e.t.)	Paraguay
Adel 88'	Report	D. Gómez 71'
Penalties
Koka (penalty scored); Elneny (penalty scored); El Debes (penalty scored); Abdelmaguid (penalty scored); Adel (penalty scored)	5–4	(penalty scored) D. Gómez; (penalty missed) Pérez; (penalty scored) Viera; (penalty scored) M. Gómez; (penalty scored) Balbuena

Stade de Marseille, Marseille
Attendance: 23,753
Referee: Glenn Nyberg (Sweden)

2 August 2024
21:00

France	1–0	Argentina
Mateta 5'	Report

Stade de Bordeaux, Bordeaux
Attendance: 37,153
Referee: Ilgiz Tantashev (Uzbekistan)

=== Semi-finals ===
5 August 2024
18:00

Morocco	1–2	Spain
Rahimi 37' (pen.)	Report	López 65'; Juanlu 86'

Stade de Marseille, Marseille
Attendance: 59,882
Referee: Ilgiz Tantashev (Uzbekistan) (substituted off) 17'
Glenn Nyberg (Sweden) (substituted on) 17'

5 August 2024
21:00

France	3–1 (a.e.t.)	Egypt
Mateta 83', 99'; Olise 108'	Report	Saber 62'

Stade de Lyon, Décines-Charpieu
Attendance: 47,530
Referee: Saíd Martínez (Honduras)

=== Bronze medal match ===
8 August 2024
17:00

Egypt	0–6	Morocco
	Report	Ezzalzouli 23'; Rahimi 26', 64'; El Khannouss 51'; Nakach 73'; Hakimi 87'

Stade de la Beaujoire, Nantes
Attendance: 27,391
Referee: Espen Eskås (Norway)

=== Gold medal match ===
9 August 2024
18:00

France	3–5 (a.e.t.)	Spain
Millot 11'; Akliouche 79'; Mateta 90+3' (pen.)	Report	López 18', 25'; Baena 28'; Camello 100', 120+1'

Parc des Princes, Paris
Attendance: 44,260
Referee: Ramon Abatti (Brazil)

== Statistics ==
=== Goalscorers ===
There were 96 goals scored in 32 matches, for an average of 3 goals per match.

8 goals

- (Morocco) Soufiane Rahimi

6 goals

- (Spain) Fermín López

5 goals

- (France) Jean-Philippe Mateta

3 goals

- (Egypt) Ibrahim Adel
- (Paraguay) Marcelo Fernández

2 goals

- (Argentina) Thiago Almada
- (France) Michael Olise
- (Iraq) Aymen Hussein
- (Japan) Shōta Fujio
- (Japan) Shunsuke Mito
- (Japan) Rihito Yamamoto
- (Morocco) Abde Ezzalzouli
- (Morocco) Achraf Hakimi
- (Spain) Álex Baena
- (Spain) Sergio Camello
- (United States) Djordje Mihailovic
- (United States) Kevin Paredes

1 goal

- (Argentina) Claudio Echeverri
- (Argentina) Ezequiel Fernández
- (Argentina) Luciano Gondou
- (Argentina) Giuliano Simeone
- (Dominican Republic) Ángel Montes de Oca
- (Dominican Republic) Rafael Núñez
- (Egypt) Ahmed Koka
- (Egypt) Mahmoud Saber
- (France) Maghnes Akliouche
- (France) Loïc Badé
- (France) Désiré Doué
- (France) Arnaud Kalimuendo
- (France) Alexandre Lacazette
- (France) Enzo Millot
- (France) Kiliann Sildillia
- (Guinea) Amadou Diawara
- (Iraq) Ali Jasim
- (Israel) Omri Gandelman
- (Israel) Oscar Gloukh
- (Japan) Mao Hosoya
- (Mali) Cheickna Doumbia
- (Morocco) Ilias Akhomach
- (Morocco) Bilal El Khannouss
- (Morocco) El Mehdi Maouhoub
- (Morocco) Akram Nakach
- (Morocco) Amir Richardson
- (New Zealand) Matthew Garbett
- (New Zealand) Jesse Randall
- (New Zealand) Ben Waine
- (Paraguay) Fabián Balbuena
- (Paraguay) Julio Enciso
- (Paraguay) Diego Gómez
- (Spain) Sergio Gómez
- (Spain) Miguel Gutiérrez
- (Spain) Samu Omorodion
- (Spain) Marc Pubill
- (Spain) Abel Ruiz
- (Spain) Juanlu Sánchez
- (Ukraine) Ihor Krasnopir
- (Ukraine) Dmytro Kryskiv
- (Ukraine) Valentyn Rubchynskyi
- (United States) Paxten Aaronson
- (United States) Gianluca Busio
- (United States) Walker Zimmerman
- (Uzbekistan) Alisher Odilov
- (Uzbekistan) Eldor Shomurodov

1 own goal

- (Mali) Hamidou Diallo (against Israel)

Source: FIFA

== Final ranking ==
As per statistical convention in football, matches decided in extra time are counted as wins and losses, while matches decided by penalty shoot-outs are counted as draws.

Pos	Team	Pld	W	D	L	GF	GA	GD	Pts	Final result
1st place, gold medalist(s)	Spain	6	5	0	1	16	8	+8	15	Gold medal
2nd place, silver medalist(s)	France (H)	6	5	0	1	14	6	+8	15	Silver medal
3rd place, bronze medalist(s)	Morocco	6	4	0	2	17	5	+12	12	Bronze medal
4	Egypt	6	2	2	2	5	11	−6	8	Fourth place
5	Japan	4	3	0	1	7	3	+4	9	Eliminated in quarter-finals
6	Paraguay	4	2	1	1	6	8	−2	7	Eliminated in quarter-finals
7	Argentina	4	2	0	2	6	4	+2	6	Eliminated in quarter-finals
8	United States	4	2	0	2	7	8	−1	6	Eliminated in quarter-finals
9	Ukraine	3	1	0	2	3	5	−2	3	Eliminated in group stage
10	Iraq	3	1	0	2	3	7	−4	3	Eliminated in group stage
11	New Zealand	3	1	0	2	3	8	−5	3	Eliminated in group stage
12	Dominican Republic	3	0	2	1	2	4	−2	2	Eliminated in group stage
13	Uzbekistan	3	0	1	2	2	4	−2	1	Eliminated in group stage
14	Mali	3	0	1	2	1	3	−2	1	Eliminated in group stage
15	Israel	3	0	1	2	3	6	−3	1	Eliminated in group stage
16	Guinea	3	0	0	3	1	6	−5	0	Eliminated in group stage

Source: IOC
(H) Hosts

== See also ==
- Football at the 2024 Summer Olympics – Women's tournament
